= John Coryton =

John Coryton may refer to:

- Sir John Coryton, 1st Baronet (1621–1680), MP for Cornwall, Launceston, and Callington
- Sir John Coryton, 2nd Baronet (1648–1690), of the Coryton baronets, MP for Newport and Callington
- Sir John Coryton, 4th Baronet (c. 1690–1739) MP for Callington

== See also ==
- Coryton (disambiguation)
