= Coryton (surname) =

Coryton is a British surname, and may refer to:

- Alec Coryton (1895–1981), senior RAF commander in World War II
- Sir John Coryton, 1st Baronet (1621–1680), MP for Cornwall, Launceston and Callington
- Sir John Coryton, 2nd Baronet (1648–1690), of the Coryton baronets, MP for Newport and Callington
- Sir John Coryton, 4th Baronet (c.1690–1739), British landowner and politician
- Laura Coryton, British campaigner and feminist activist
- Sarah Elizabeth Coryton, High Sheriff of Cornwall, UK
- William Coryton (1580–1651), Cornish politician
