= Jonathan Prideaux (died 1710) =

English politician (c.1646–1710)

Jonathan Prideaux (c.1646–1710) was an English Whig politician.

== Biography ==
Prideaux was the second, but eldest surviving, son of Sir Richard Prideaux and Mary Barrett. He first held public office as a commissioner for the assessment of tax in Devon between 1673 and 1680. He was serving as a captain in a militia regiment of horse by 1680. In 1686, he represented Tywarnwheale in the Cornish Stannary Parliament. In 1687, he was appointed a justice of the peace for Devon, but he was removed from the role in July 1688 after returning negative answers to James II's questions on the repeal of the Test Acts 1673 & 1678 and Penal laws. He was reappointed in October 1688, shortly before the Glorious Revolution.

Prideaux was returned to the House of Commons of England as a Member of Parliament for Callington in the 1689 English general election, likely on the interest of Samuel Rolle. He voted with the Whigs on the disabling clause to the Corporation Bill of 1690, aimed at purging the municipalities of Tory office holders. He made no recorded speeches and was not appointed to any committees during the Convention Parliament. He gave up his seat to Francis Fulford at the 1690 English general election, but re-entered parliament on the death of Sir John Coryton, 2nd Baronet later that year. He was relatively inactive in parliament; his name only featured on one legislative initiative, a bill to encourage the manufacture of saltpeter. Prideaux was granted leave of absence in January 1692, February 1694 and March 1695. He did not stand at the 1695 English general election.

Parliament of England
Preceded by Sir John Coryton, Bt; Sir William Coryton, Bt	Member of Parliament for Callington with Sir John Coryton, Bt; 1690–1695	Succeeded by Sir John Coryton, Bt; Francis Fulford
Preceded by Sir John Coryton, Bt; Francis Fulford	Member of Parliament for Callington with Francis Fulford; 1690–1695	Succeeded by Sir William Coryton, Bt; Francis Gwyn
