= Carew Reynell (politician) =

English courtier, soldier and politician

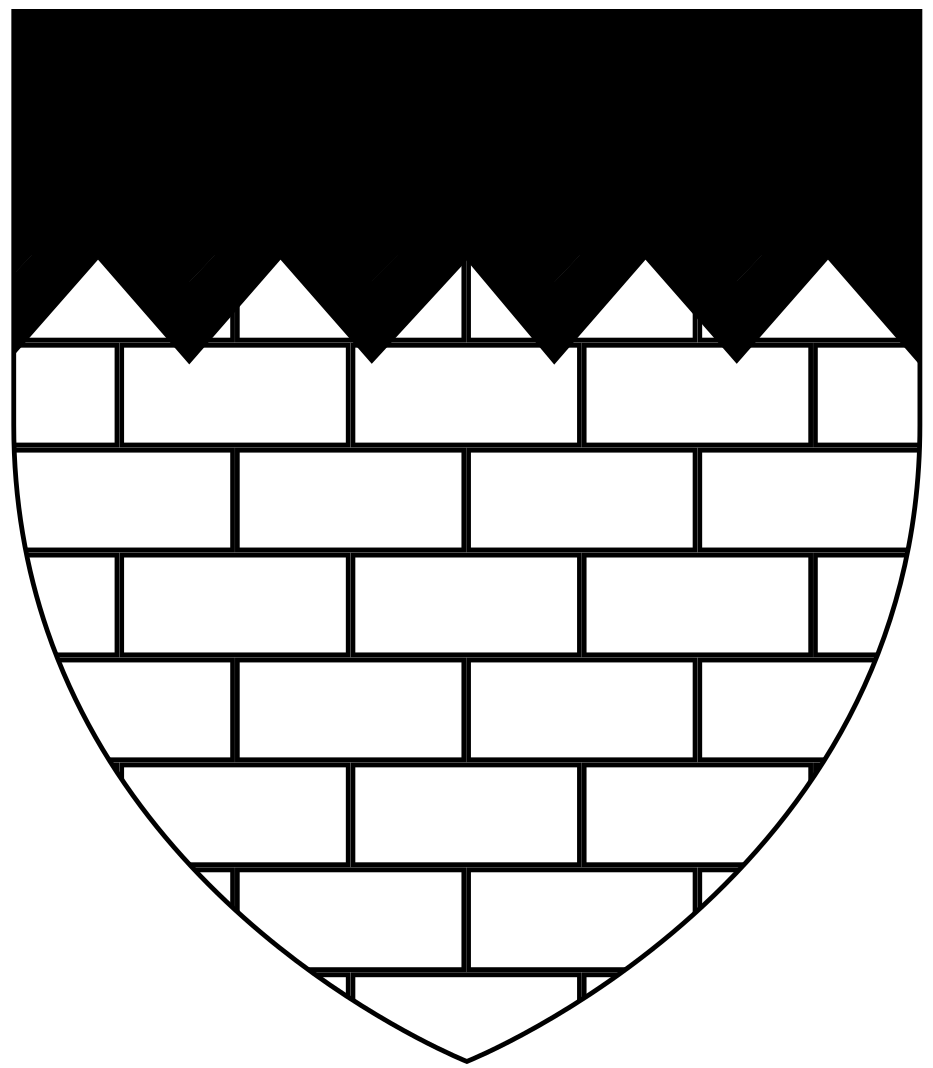
- Arms of Reynell: Argent, masonry sable a chief indented of the second

Member of Parliament for Cricklade
- In office 1621-1622

Member of Parliament for Wallingford
- In office 1614

Member of Parliament for Lancaster
- In office 1601

Member of Parliament for Callington
- In office 1593

Personal details
- Born: 1563 England
- Died: 7 September 1624 (aged 60–61)
- Spouse: Susan Erneley
- Parent: Richard Reynell (father)
- Relatives: Richard Reynell (brother); Thomas Reynell (nephew); Richard Reynell (nephew)

Sir Carew Reynell (1563 – 7 September 1624) was an English courtier, soldier and politician who sat in the House of Commons at various times between 1593 and 1622.

== Life ==
Reynell was the son of Richard Reynell (d.1585) of East Ogwell, Devon, and his wife Agnes Southcote, daughter of John Southcote of Bovey Tracey, Devon. In 1591 he became a gentleman pensioner to Queen Elizabeth and was in enough favour with the Queen that she asked the dean and chapter of Exeter to grant him two manors in Devon. In 1593, he was elected Member of Parliament for Callington. He was the queen’s printer in Greek and Latin until 1597 when he sailed with the Earl of Essex on the Islands Voyage, possibly commanding the Foresight. Later he went with Essex to Ireland, where he led a troop of foot and held the fort of Duncannon, Wexford "a place of great importance". He was knighted on 12 July 1599 and was captain of Duncannon castle from 1599 to 1601. When the Earl of Essex was in disgrace, Reynell showed loyalty stating "I am particularly bound to my Lord of Essex; yet so that I will never betray the trust reposed in me". He was imprisoned briefly in February 1601, but was exonerated from any involvement in the plot by the evidence of Sir Christopher Blount and Sir Charles Danvers.

In 1601 Reynell was elected MP for Lancaster, He was keeper of mansion house at Dartford, Kent in 1603 and became a Gentleman Usher of the privy chamber to King James I. In 1614 he was elected MP for Wallingford. He was elected MP for Cricklade in 1621.

Reynell died at the age of about 61 and was buried at St. Martin-in-the-Fields.

Reynell married after 1593, Susan Erneley, widow of Michael Erneley of Bishops Canning, Wiltshire and previously of Sir John Marvyn, and daughter of Walter Hungerford, of Farleigh Castle, Somerset and Hungerford, Wiltshire, but had no children.

Parliament of England
Preceded by Robert Worsley; Henry Golding	Member of Parliament for Callington; 1593; With: Robert Carey	Succeeded by Henry Ferrers; John Egerton
Preceded by Sir Thomas Hesketh; Edward Hubberd	Member of Parliament for Lancaster; 1601; With: Sir Jerome Bowes	Succeeded by Sir Thomas Hesketh; Thomas Fanshawe
Preceded by Sir William Dunch; Griffith Payne	Member of Parliament for Wallingford; 1614; With: Sir George Simeon	Succeeded by Sir George Simeon; Samuel Dunch
Preceded by Sir Thomas Monson; Sir John Eyre	Member of Parliament for Cricklade; 1621–1622; With: Sir Thomas Howard	Succeeded by Sir William Howard; Sir Neville Poole
