= Coryton =

Coryton may refer to several places in the United Kingdom:

- Coryton, Cardiff, Wales
  - Coryton railway station (Cardiff), still in use
- Coryton Refinery, Essex, England, oil refinery and former village
  - Coryton (Essex) railway station, a closed railway station in Britain, closed 1952
- Coryton, Devon, England
  - Coryton railway station (Devon), closed 1962
  - Coryton Cove at Dawlish in Devon, location of Coryton Tunnel
- Coryton baronets
- Coryton (surname)

== See also ==
- John Coryton (disambiguation)
