= Richard Chiverton =

Lord Mayor of London (1658)

Sir Richard Chiverton (died 1679) of the Worshipful Company of Skinners was Lord Mayor of London in 1658. (Note: There is an uncommon print of Sir Richard Chiverton, Lord Mayor of London, sitting in an elbow chair.)

== Biography ==
Chiverton was the grandson of Richard Chiverton (died 1621), of Trehunsey in Quethiock, Cornwall and Isabella (died 1631), daughter of Digory Polwhele.

Chiverton of the Worshipful Company of Skinners was Lord Mayor of London in 1658. He was knighted on 22 March 1658 by the Lord Protector Oliver Cromwell at Whitehall.

Chiverton officiated as mayor in proclaiming Richard Cromwell Lord Protector in September 1658. According to a long report in the Mercurius Politicus, (a newspaper which was sympathetic to the Commonwealth) the proclamation "was followed by loud shouts and acclamations of the people God Save the Lord Protector", but this was not the universal support implied, and when three days later the proclamation was read in Oxford the Oxford dignitaries and troopers "were pelted with carrot and turnip-tops, by young scholars and others, who stood at a distance".

He was the first Cornish Lord Mayor of London and did not fall out of favour at the Restoration as he was considered for membership of the Knights of the Royal Oak. and was knighted by Charles II on 12 October 1663.

== Family ==
Richard Chiverton was married and had a daughter called Elizabeth who married Sir John Coryton, bart.
