= Francis Fulford (1666–1700) =

English Tory politician (1666–1700)

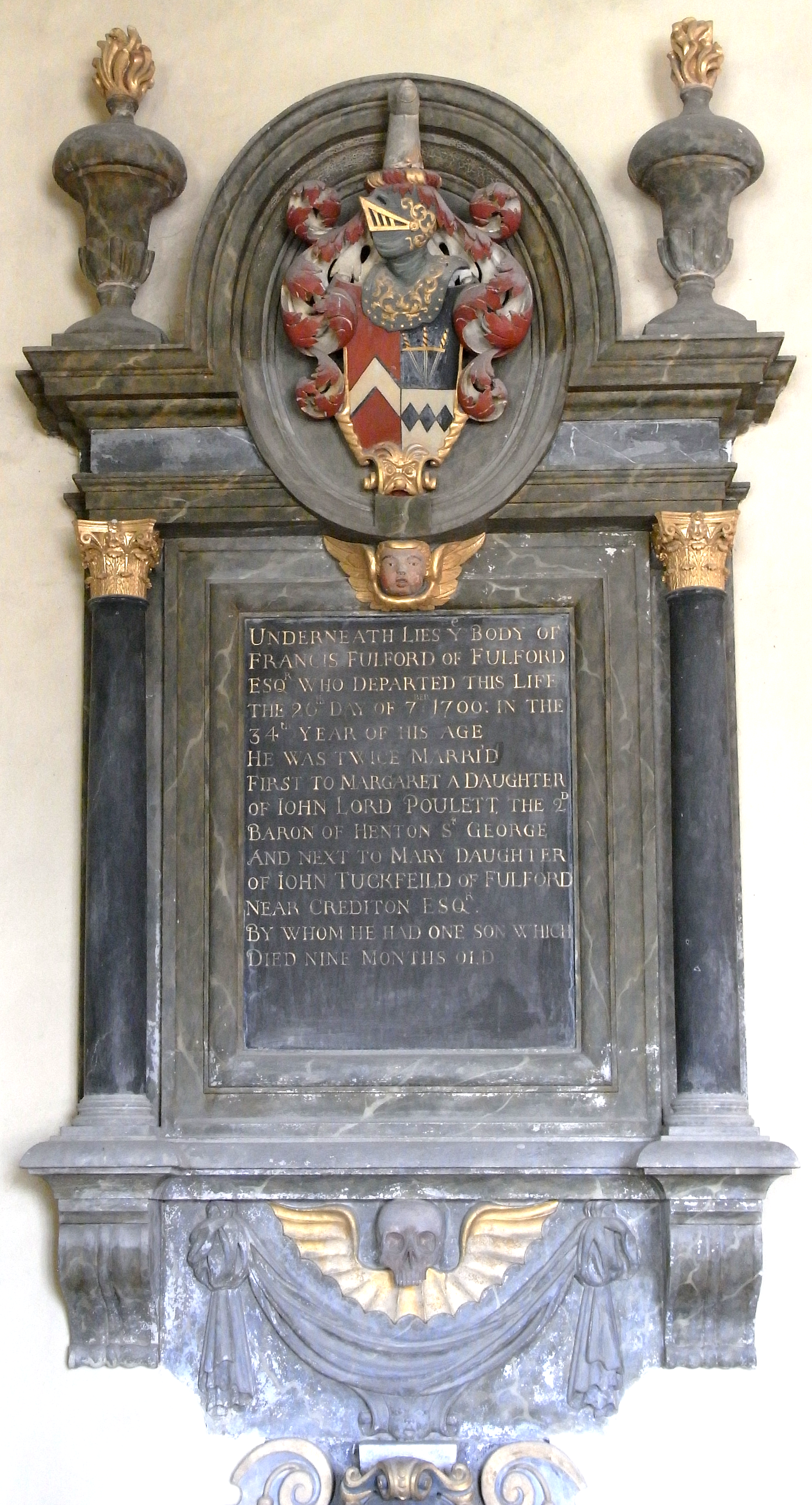
Mural monument to Col. Francis Fulford (1666–1700) in the Fulford Chapel of Dunsford Church

Francis Fulford (8 October 1666 – 26 September 1700) was an English Tory politician.

== Biography ==
Fulford was the second, but eldest surviving, son of Francis Fulford of Great Fulford and Susanna Kelland. He was educated at Exeter College, Oxford from 1682. In November 1688, he supported the Glorious Revolution and he served terms as High Sheriff of Devon and Mayor of Exeter in 1689–90.

Fulford was returned to the House of Commons of England as a Member of Parliament for Callington in Cornwall in the 1690 English general election. He was classed as a Tory by Lord Carmarthen, but was a generally inactive member. On 16 November 1690 Fulford was placed in custody after failing to attend the Commons, but was released after five days. He did not stand in the 1695 English general election, but was again returned for Callington in the 1698 English general election. He was listed in this parliament as a likely opponent of a standing army. He died on 26 September 1700 and was buried on 7 October.

Fulford married twice; first to Margaret, daughter of John Poulett, 3rd Baron Poulett, and second to Mary, daughter and co-heiress of John Tuckfield. Through his second marriage, Fulford came into possession of Little Fulford.

Parliament of England
Preceded by Sir John Coryton, Bt; Jonathan Prideaux	Member of Parliament for Callington with Sir John Coryton, Bt (1690); Jonathan Prideaux (1690–1695); 1690–1695	Succeeded by Sir William Coryton, Bt; Francis Gwyn
Preceded by Sir William Coryton, Bt; Francis Gwyn	Member of Parliament for Callington with Sir William Coryton, Bt; 1698–1701	Succeeded by Sir William Coryton, Bt; Robert Rolle
