= Thomas Coplestone =

British politician

Member of Parliament for Callington
- In office 1719–1748

Personal details
- Born: 1688 England
- Died: 1748 (aged 59–60)
- Party: Whig

Thomas Coplestone (1688–1748) of Bowden, Yealmpton, Devon, was a British landowner and Whig politician who sat in the House of Commons for 29 years from 1719 to 1748.

== Origins ==
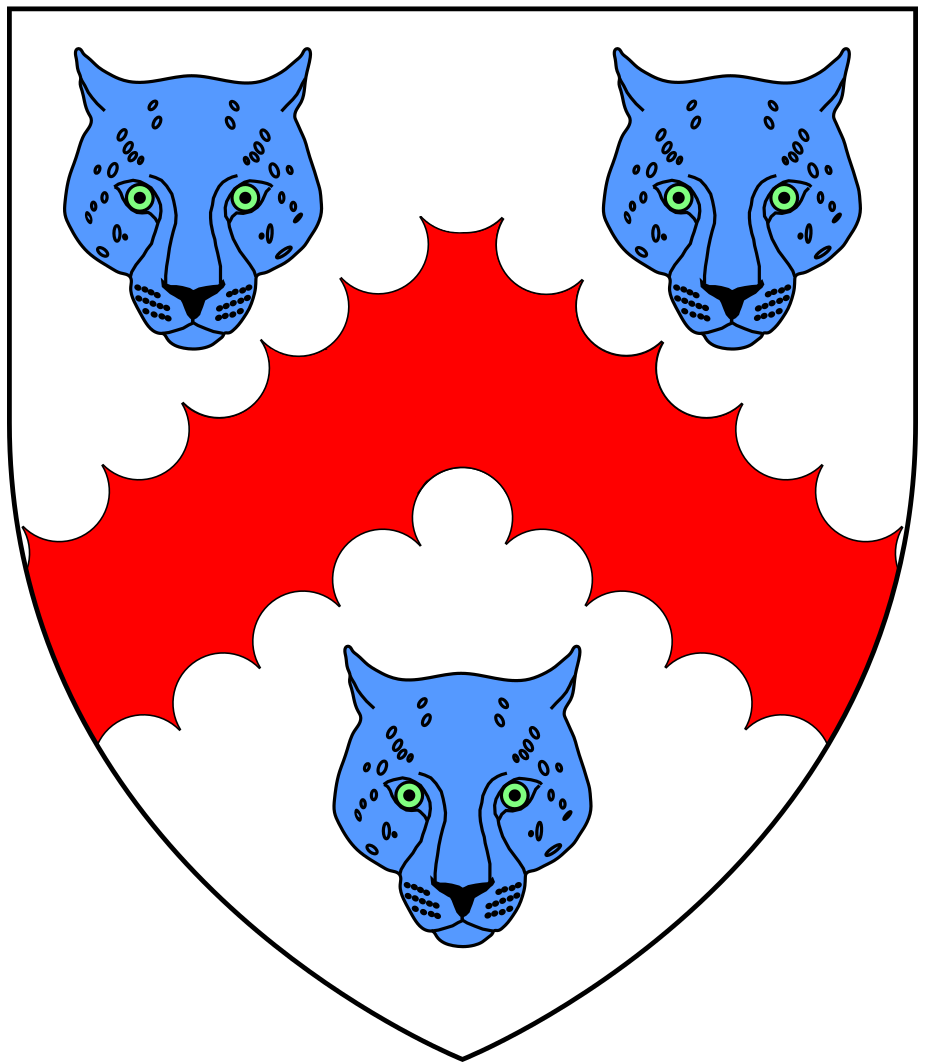
Arms of Copleston: Argent, a chevron engrailed gules between three lions' faces azure

Coplestone was baptized on 25 May 1688 the eldest son of John Copleston of Bowden and his wife Mary Reynell of West Ogwell, Devon.

From the 15th century until 1748 Bowden was for 8 generations the seat of a junior branch of the prominent and ancient Copleston family of Copplestone in the parish of Colebrooke, Devon. It was first the seat of Walter Copleston, the 3rd son of John Copleston (d.1458) of Copleston. John Copleston served three times as a Member of Parliament for Devon, and married Elizabeth Hawley (d.1457), daughter and eventual heiress of John Hawley (died 1436) "the Younger", of Dartmouth in Devon, 12 times a Member of Parliament for Dartmouth, and son of John Hawley (d.1408) ("the Elder") of Dartmouth, a wealthy ship owner who served fourteen times as Mayor of Dartmouth and was elected four times as a Member of Parliament for Dartmouth, whose magnificent monumental brass survives in St Saviour's Church, Dartmouth.

== Career ==
Coplestone was admitted at the Middle Temple in 1704 for training as a lawyer. He was elected a Member of Parliament for Callington in Cornwall, a pocket borough owned by the Rolle family of Heanton Satchville, Petrockstowe, Devon, at a by-election on 4 December 1719 in succession to Samuel Rolle (1646–1719) of whose estates he was a trustee. He was a Whig and voted with the Administration in every recorded division, except when he was absent. He was elected again in 1722, but was returned unopposed in 1727. In 1730, he was appointed Clerk of quit-rents and forfeitures in Ireland and held the post for the rest of his life. He was returned unopposed as MP for Callington in 1734 but he faced contests which he won in 1741 and 1747.

== Death and succession ==
He died unmarried on 19 February 1748. After his death his executors sold Bowden to William Pollexfen Bastard (1727–1782) of nearby Kitley in the parish of Yealmpton, who was gazetted as a baronet in 1779 but as he took no steps towards passing the patent the title was not used by him or his descendants.

Parliament of Great Britain
Preceded by Samuel Rolle; Sir John Coryton	Member of Parliament for Callington; 1719–1748; With: Sir John Coryton 1719–1722; Thomas Lutwyche 1722–1727; Sir John Coryton 1727–1734; Isaac le Heup 1734–1741; Hon. Horatio Walpole 1741–1748	Succeeded by Edward Bacon; Hon. Horatio Walpole
