= Morshead baronets =

Escutcheon of the Morshead baronets of Trenant Park

The Morshead baronetcy, of Trenant Park in the County of Cornwall, was a title in the Baronetage of Great Britain. It was created on 22 January 1784 for John Morshead, Member of Parliament for Callington and Bodmin and Lord Warden of the Stannaries. The title became extinct on the death of the 3rd Baronet in 1905.

== Morshead baronets, of Trenant Park (1784) ==
- Sir John Morshead, 1st Baronet (1747–1813)
- Sir Frederick Treise Morshead, 2nd Baronet (1783–1828)
- Sir Warwick Charles Morshead, 3rd Baronet (1824–1905)

Baronetage of Great Britain
Preceded by Barrow baronets	Morshead baronets of Trenant Park; 22 January 1784	Succeeded by Rycroft baronets
