= Bowden, Yealmpton =

Historic estate in Devon, England

Bowden is a historic estate in the parish of Yealmpton in Devon, England. From the 15th century until 1748 the manor house was for eight generations the seat of a junior branch of the Copleston family of Copplestone. The manor house was largely rebuilt in the 19th century and, together with some of its outbuildings, now serves as a farmhouse.

== History ==
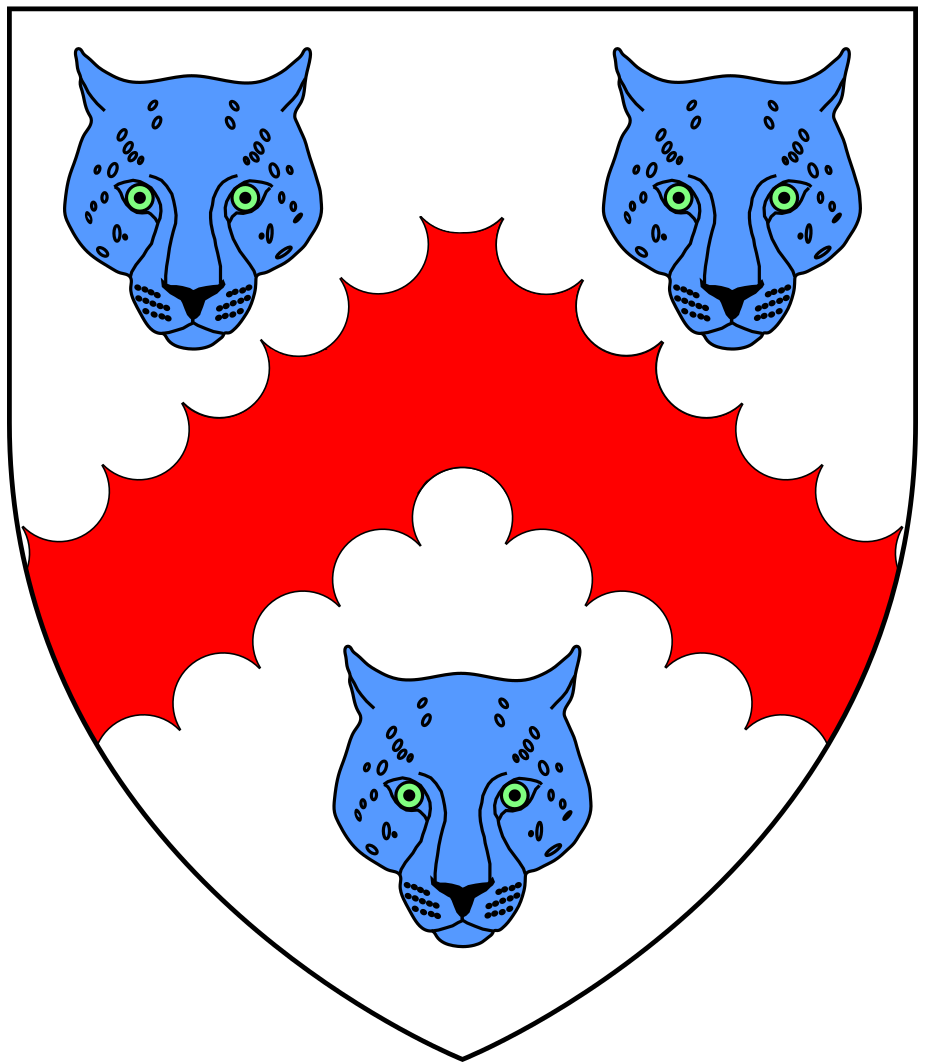
Arms of Copleston

The earliest holder of the estate recorded by the Devonshire historian Sir William Pole (d.1635), was John de Bowdon. It then passed via successive heiresses to the Lawtram and Stone families. Elizabeth Stone, daughter and heiress of Thomas Stone, married Walter Copleston, and Bowden descended for many generations as a seat of their Copleston descendants.

- Walter Copleston was the third son of John Copleston (died 1458) of Copplestone in the parish of Colebrooke, Devon.
- Thomas Copleston, son and heir, who married Catherine Vowell, a daughter of William Fowell (died 1507) (or Vowell) of Fowelscombe in the parish of Ugborough, Devon, a Member of Parliament for Totnes in Devon.

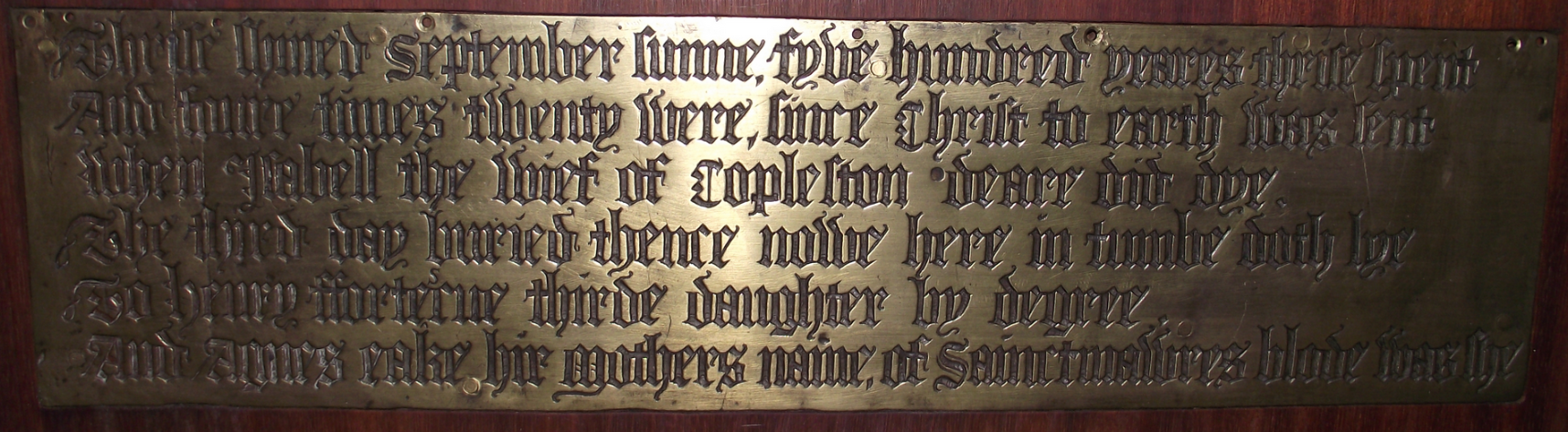
Monumental brass in Yealmpton Church to Isabella Fortescue (d.1580), wife of John Copleston

- John Copleston (born 1508), son and heir, who married Isabella Fortescue (died 3 September 1580), third daughter of Henry Fortescue of Preston, in the parish of Newton Ferrers, by his wife Elisabeth St Maur, a daughter of William St Maur lord of the manor of North Molton. A monumental brass survives in St Bartholomew's Church, Yealmpton.
- Henry Copleston, son and heir.
- Arthur Copleston, son and heir, who in 1598 married Margaret Crymes, who survived him and remarried in 1607 to Oliver Whiddon.
- Henry Copleston, son and heir, admitted as a law student to the Inner Temple in 1614. He married Mary Were (died 1630). Her chest tomb monument survives in St Bartholomew's Church, Yealmpton,
- Arthur Copleston (died 1681), brother, who in 1642 married Elizabeth Davie (born 1618), a daughter of Sir John Davie, 1st Baronet of Creedy, Sandford, Devon.
- John Copleston (born 1642/3), son and heir, who in 1670 married Mary Reynell (died 1720/1), eldest daughter of Thomas Reynell (1625-1697/8) of West Ogwell, Devon, a Member of Parliament and Sheriff of Devon.
- Thomas Coplestone (1688–1748), son and heir, a Member of Parliament for Callington. He was the last in the male line of the Coplestons of Bowden.

In 1753, after the death of Thomas Coplestone in 1748, his executors sold Bowden to William Bastard (1727-1782) of nearby Kitley in the parish of Yealmpton, who was gazetted as a baronet in 1779 but as he took no steps towards passing the patent the title was not used by him or his descendants.

== Sources ==
- Risdon, Tristram (died 1640), Survey of Devon. With considerable additions. London, 1811.
- Vivian, Lt.Col. J.L., (Ed.) The Visitations of the County of Devon: Comprising the Heralds' Visitations of 1531, 1564 & 1620. Exeter, 1895.
