= Isaac le Heup =

British diplomat and politician

Isaac le Heup (c.1686–1747) of Gunthorpe, Norfolk, was a British diplomat and politician who sat in the House of Commons between 1722 and 1741.

== Early life ==
Le Heup was the eldest son of Thomas Le Heup, and his wife Jeanne Harmon, daughter of Pierre Harmon of Caen, Normandy. His father was a Huguenot from St. Lo, Normandy who emigrated to England on the revocation of the Edict of Nantes and settled at St. Anne's, Westminster. Le Heup married Elizabeth Lombard, daughter of Peter Lombard of Burnham Thorpe, Norfolk, tailor to Queen Anne, on 10 August 1720. He was thus connected by this marriage to Horace Walpole who was his brother-in-law. He succeeded his father in 1736.

== Career ==
Le Heup was returned as Member of Parliament for Bodmin as a government supporter at the 1722 general election. In 1726 he was appointed British representative at the Diet of Ratisbon, but was expelled in April 1727 in a tit-for-tat reprisal for the expulsion of the Imperial minister from London. He purchased Gunthorpe Hall from the trustees of the South Sea Company in 1726. In July 1727 he was sent as envoy to Stockholm, but was rude to the Prince of Wales at Hanover when on his way to take up his appointment and was recalled after 17 days.

Le Heup stood unsuccessfully for Parliament for Wallingford at the 1727 general election and was eventually returned for Grampound at a by-election on 31 Jan. 1732. At the 1734 general election, he was returned as MP for Callington, a Walpole borough. He voted with the Administration in every recorded division. He did not stand at the 1741 general election, but was appointed a commissioner of customs in August 1741. Following the fall of Walpole.in the next year, he was dismissed from the post.

== Death and legacy ==
Le Heup died on 25 April 1747, aged 61. He had a son and two daughters, Elizabeth and Mary. Elizabeth married John Lloyd MP.

Parliament of Great Britain
Preceded by Charles Beauclerk; John Legh	Member of Parliament for Bodmin; 1722–1727; With: Richard West 1722-1727; John LaRoche 1727	Succeeded by Robert Booth; John LaRoche
Preceded by Philip Hawkins; Humphry Morice	Member of Parliament for Grampound; 1732–1734; With: Philip Hawkins	Succeeded by Philip Hawkins; Thomas Hales
Preceded by Thomas Coplestone; Sir John Coryton	Member of Parliament for Callington; 1734–1741; With: Thomas Coplestone	Succeeded by Thomas Coplestone; Hon. Horatio Walpole
