= Sir John Heathcote, 2nd Baronet =

British merchant and politician

Sir John Heathcote, 2nd Baronet (1689 – 6 September 1759) of Normanton Park, Rutland was a British merchant and Whig politician who sat in the House of Commons in two periods between 1715 and 1741.

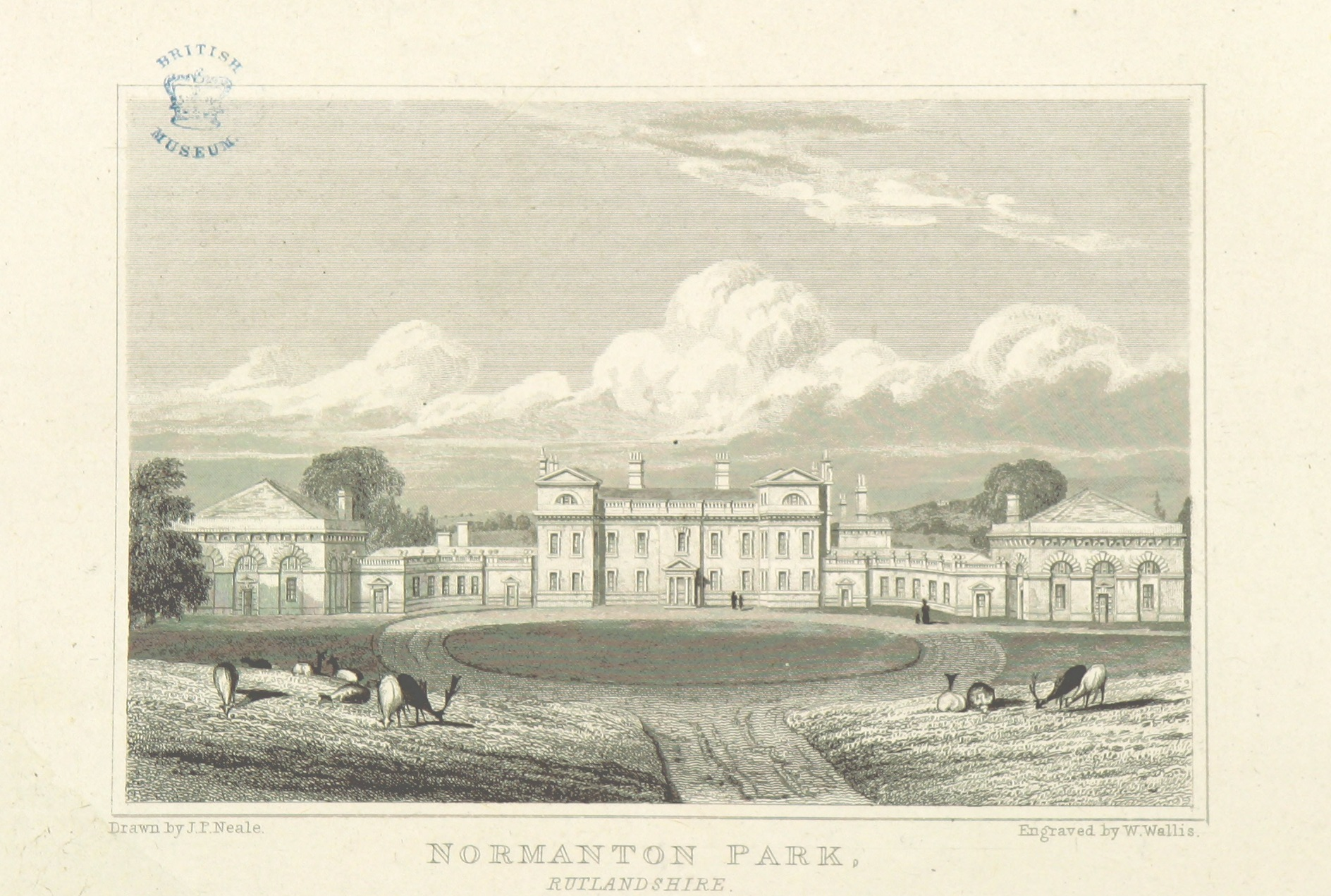
Normanton Park (1818) by John Preston Neale

Heathcote was the eldest surviving son of Sir Gilbert Heathcote, 1st Baronet, Lord Mayor of London, and his wife Hester Rayner, daughter of Christopher Rayner. He married Bridget White, daughter of Thomas White, on 5 August 1720.

Heathcote was elected as a Whig Member of Parliament for Grantham in a contest at the 1715 British general election. He did not stand in 1722. He was a Director of the East India Company from 1716 to 1724 and a Director of the Bank of England at statutory intervals between 1725 and 1735. From 1728 to 1731, he served again as a Director of the East India Company. He succeeded to the baronetcy and Normanton Park on the death of his father on 25 January 1733.

Heathcote was returned unopposed as MP for Bodmin at a by-election on 9 February 1733 and subsequently at the 1734 British general election. He voted with the Administration in every recorded division, except for the place bill in 1740. Between 1735 and 1740, he rebuilt Normanton Hall to the design of Henry Joynes. He was defeated at the 1741 British general election and then lived the life of a country gentleman, spending seven months of the year at Normanton. An attempt to obtain a parliamentary seat at Rutland in 1754 came to nothing. He was a trustee of the British Museum and president of the Foundling Hospital.

Heathcote died on 5 September 1759, aged 70 and was succeeded by his eldest son Gilbert Heathcote. His wife Bridget died on 5 May 1772. They had two sons and seven daughters, of whom were:

- Gilbert Heathcote, 3rd Baronet (d. 2 November 1785), married firstly Margaret Hardwicke (d. 10 August 1796), married secondly Elizabeth Hudson (d. 14 July 1813).
- John Heathcote (d. 29 July 1795) married Lydia Moyer (d. 14 August 1822), they had two children.
- Bridget Heathcote (d. 2 March 1805) married James Douglas 14th Earl of Morton.
- Ann Heathcote married Sir Robert Hamilton 4th Baronet, of Silvertonhill

The St Matthew's Church Normanton memorial tablet of Sir John Heathcote, 2nd Baronet, was removed 20 July 1972 to St Mary's Church at Edith Weston, Oakham.

== See also ==
- Heathcote (surname)

Parliament of Great Britain
| Preceded by Sir John Thorold, Bt; Sir John Brownlow, Bt | Member of Parliament for Grantham; 1715–1722; With: Edward Rolt | Succeeded by Francis Fisher; The Viscount Tyrconnel |
| Preceded by John LaRoche; Robert Booth | Member of Parliament for Bodmin; 1733–1741; With: John LaRoche | Succeeded by John LaRoche; Thomas Bludworth |
Baronetage of Great Britain
| Preceded by Gilbert Heathcote | Baronet (of the City of London); 1733–1759 | Succeeded by Gilbert Heathcote |
