= Sir John Morshead, 1st Baronet =

British politician and official in Cornwall

Sir John Morshead 1st Baronet
- Portrait of Sir John Morshead, Bt

Lord Warden of the Stannaries
- In office 1798–1800
- Monarch: George III
- Preceded by: Viscount Lewisham
- Succeeded by: John Willett Payne

Personal details
- Born: 1747
- Died: 1813 (aged 65–66)
- Parent(s): William Morshead; Olympia Treise

Sir John Morshead, 1st Baronet (1747 – 10 April 1813) was a British politician, landowner and official in the Duchy of Cornwall. Although initially a Whig and then a follower of Charles James Fox, from 1794 he became a supporter of William Pitt the Younger. He was Lord Warden of the Stannaries from 1798 to 1800 in the service of George, Prince of Wales.

== Early life ==
Morshead was the eldest surviving son of William Morshead of Cartuther and Olympia, née Treise. He was educated at Oriel College, Oxford from 1766. In 1780 he succeeded to his father's estates and in 1784 he inherited the Lavethan estate of his maternal uncle, Sir Christopher Treise, making Morshead "one of the largest landowners in the West of England".

== Career ==
In 1778 and 1779, Morshead unsuccessfully contested Callington, but he won the seat at the 1780 British general election with the support of John Montagu, 4th Earl of Sandwich. As a Member of Parliament he was a steady supporter of the North ministry. After the collapse of North's government in 1782, Morshead joined the opposition. He voted against the peace preliminaries proposed by the Shelburne ministry and in 1783 he continued to be listed as a supporter of Sandwich.

In recognition of his support for the subsequent Fox–North coalition, on 22 January 1784 he was created a baronet, of Trenant Park in the Baronetage of Great Britain. At the 1784 British general election, Morshead was elected to represent Bodmin. By this stage, he was in the circle of the Prince of Wales. On 4 March 1788 he joined the Whig club. He was active in promoting the opposition Foxite interest in Cornwall in the 1790 British general election and was again returned as MP for Bodmin after a contest. He voted with the Whigs over the Ochakov crisis of 1791 and supported the repeal of the Test Act in Scotland. In February 1793, Morshead was considered a possible supporter of William Windham's new Third Party, but he did not participate.

In 1794, Morshead joined the Duke of Portland in shifting his support away from Whigs to the First Pitt ministry over fears of the French Revolution and radicalism. That year, he was appointed Surveyor-General of the Duchy of Cornwall and in 1798 he was made Lord Warden of the Stannaries. He rarely – if ever – spoke in Parliament, but was regarded in contemporary parliamentary lists as a consistent supporter of Pitt. He helped the Prince of Wales to raise additional funds from the Duchy, but by December 1800 the two men had fallen out and the Prince sought ways "to get rid of the baronet". Morshead was subsequently replaced by John Willett Payne as Lord Warden. Morshead's standing in Cornwall was significantly reduced and he did not stand for re-election at the 1802 United Kingdom general election. He remained Surveyor-General until 1808 and died, much depleted by gambling and heavy debts, on 10 April 1813.

Between 1798 and 1803, he was colonel of the Royal Cornwall and Devon Miners Regiment of Militia.

== Marriage and issue ==
Morshead married Elizabeth Frederick, a daughter and co-heiress of Sir Thomas Frederick, 3rd Baronet, on 13 April 1778. They had two sons and three daughters. The couple had their portraits painted by George Romney in 1786–7. Morshead was succeeded in his title and estates by his eldest son, Frederick Treise Morshead.

Parliament of the United Kingdom
Preceded by Parliament of Great Britain	Member of Parliament for Bodmin; 1801–1802; With: John Nesbitt	Succeeded by Josias Porcher; John Sargent
Parliament of Great Britain
Preceded by William Masterman; George Hunt	Member of Parliament for Bodmin; 1784–1800; With: Thomas Hunt (1784–1789); George Wilbraham (1789–1790); Roger Wilbraham (1790–1796); John Nesbitt (1796–1800)	Succeeded by Parliament of the United Kingdom
Preceded by George Stratton; William Skrine	Member of Parliament for Callington; 1780–1784; With: George Stratton	Succeeded by Sir John Call, Bt; Paul Orchard
Political offices
Preceded by Viscount Lewisham	Lord Warden of the Stannaries; 1798–1800	Succeeded by John Willett Payne
Baronetage of Great Britain
New creation	Baronet (of Trenant Park); 1784–1813	Succeeded by Frederick Treise Morshead
