= Trenant Park =

Country house in Cornwall, England

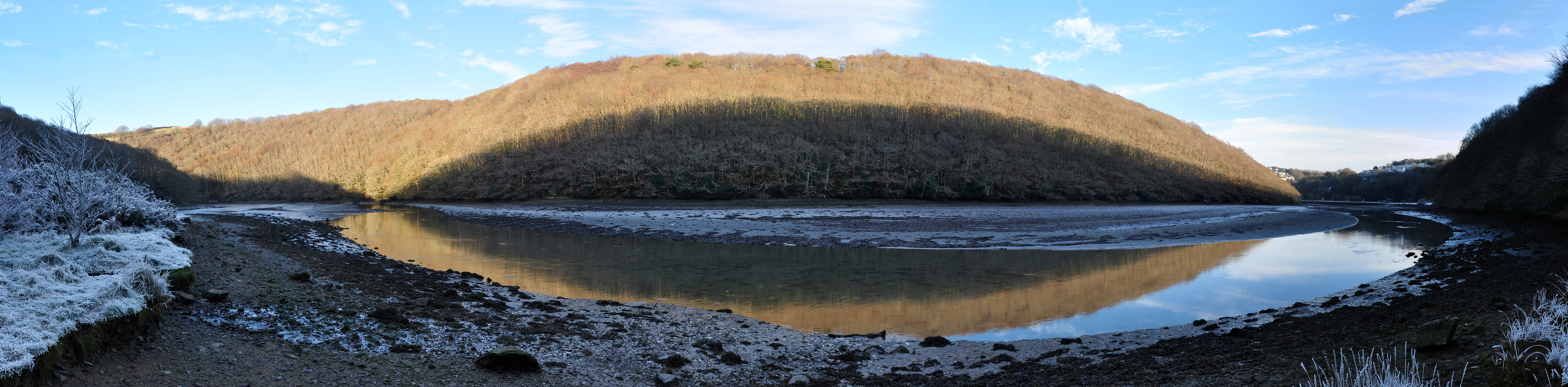
The West Looe River and Trenant Wood

Trenant Park is a Grade II listed country house in the civil parish of Duloe in east Cornwall, England, UK. It is surrounded by a large park and woodland. It is sited on a tongue of land between the East and West Looe rivers. The house was possibly built in the early 17th century, remodelled in the early 18th century, extended in the mid 19th century and divided into flats in the 20th century.

The manor of Trenant was recorded in the Domesday Book (1086) when it was held by Osferth from Robert, Count of Mortain. He had also held it before 1066 and paid tax for 1 virgate of land. There was half a hide of land and land for 8 ploughs. There were 2 ploughs, 2 serfs, 4 villeins, 12 smallholders, 6 acres of woodland, 40 acres of pasture, 2 cows, 2 pigs and 8 goats. The value of the manor was 15 shillings though it had formerly been worth £3 sterling. The manor belonged at various times to the families of Hewis, Colshull, Arundell, Whittington, Treise and Morshead. In 1806 it was sold by Sir John Morshead, 1st Baronet to Admiral Sir Edward Buller and later to William Peel.

== See also ==
- Buller baronets
- Morshead baronets
