= Horace Walpole =

British politician, writer, historian and antiquarian (1717–1797)

The Right Honourable The Earl of Orford
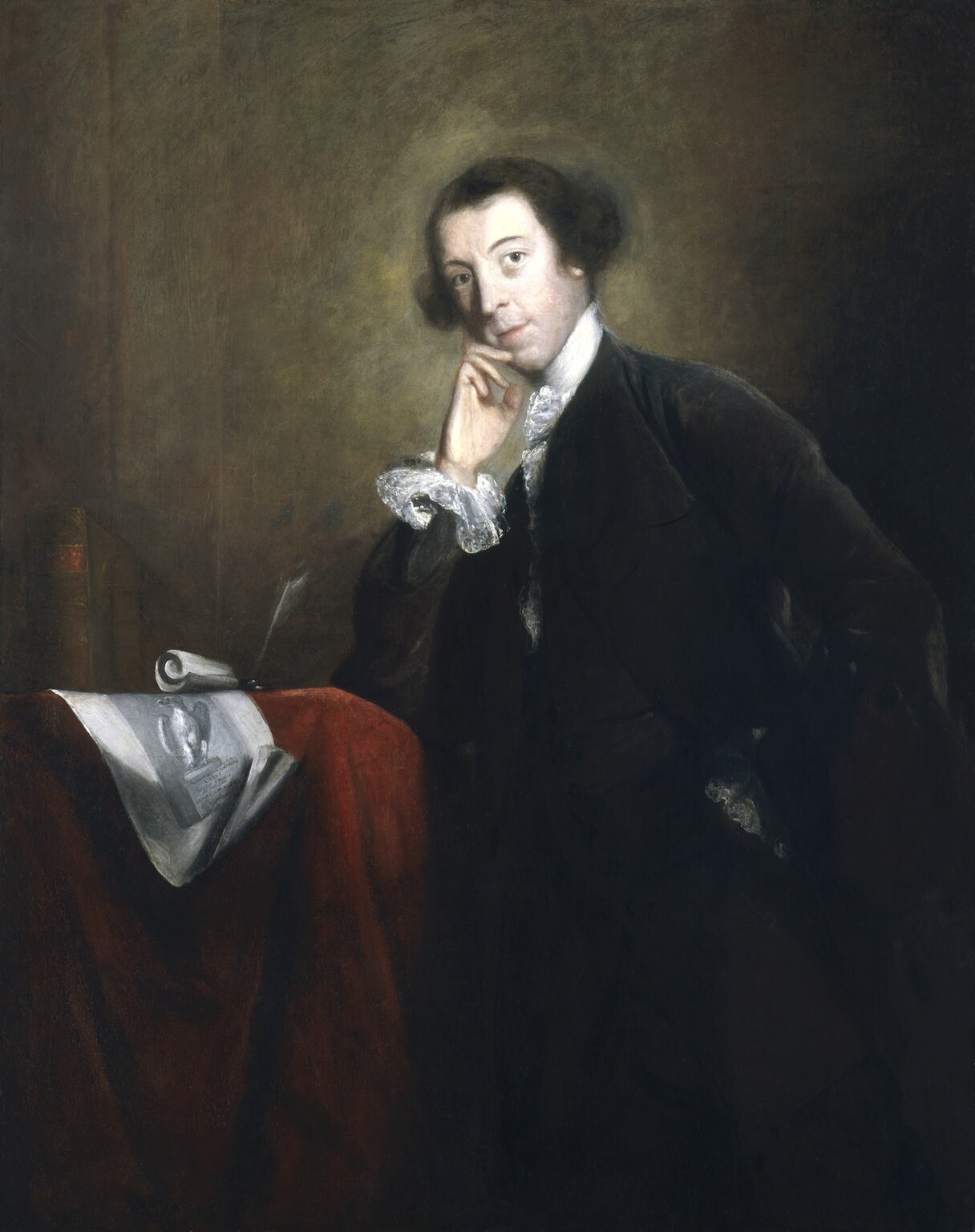
- Portrait of Horace Walpole by Sir Joshua Reynolds, 1756

Member of Parliament for King's Lynn
- In office 25 February 1757 – 16 March 1769 Serving with Sir John Turner, 3rd Baronet
- Preceded by: Horatio Walpole the Elder
- Succeeded by: Thomas Walpole

Member of Parliament for Castle Rising
- In office 21 May 1754 – 25 February 1757 Serving with Thomas Howard
- Preceded by: Robert Knight
- Succeeded by: Charles Boone

Member of Parliament for Callington
- In office 12 June 1741 – 18 April 1754 Serving with Thomas Coplestone (1741–1748), Edward Bacon (1748–1754)
- Preceded by: Isaac le Heup
- Succeeded by: John Sharpe

Personal details
- Born: Horatio Walpole; 24 September 1717 London, England, Great Britain
- Died: 2 March 1797 (aged 79) Berkeley Square, London, Great Britain
- Resting place: St Martin's Church, Houghton, Norfolk
- Party: Whigs
- Parents: Robert Walpole; Catherine Shorter
- Relatives: Hugh Walpole (great-great-grandnephew)
- Education: King's College, Cambridge
- Occupation: Writer; Art Historian; Man of Letters; Antiquarian; Politician

Horatio Walpole, 4th Earl of Orford (/ˈwɔːlpoʊl/; 24 September 1717 – 2 March 1797), better known as Horace Walpole, was a British Whig politician, writer, historian and antiquarian.

He had Strawberry Hill House built in Twickenham, southwest London, reviving the Gothic style some decades before his Victorian successors. His literary reputation rests on the first Gothic novel, The Castle of Otranto (1764), and his Letters, which are of significant social and political interest. They have been published by Yale University Press in 48 volumes. In 2017, a volume of Walpole's selected letters was published.

The youngest son of the first British prime minister, Sir Robert Walpole, 1st Earl of Orford, he became the 4th and last Earl of Orford of the second creation on his nephew's death in 1791.

== Early life: 1717–1739 ==
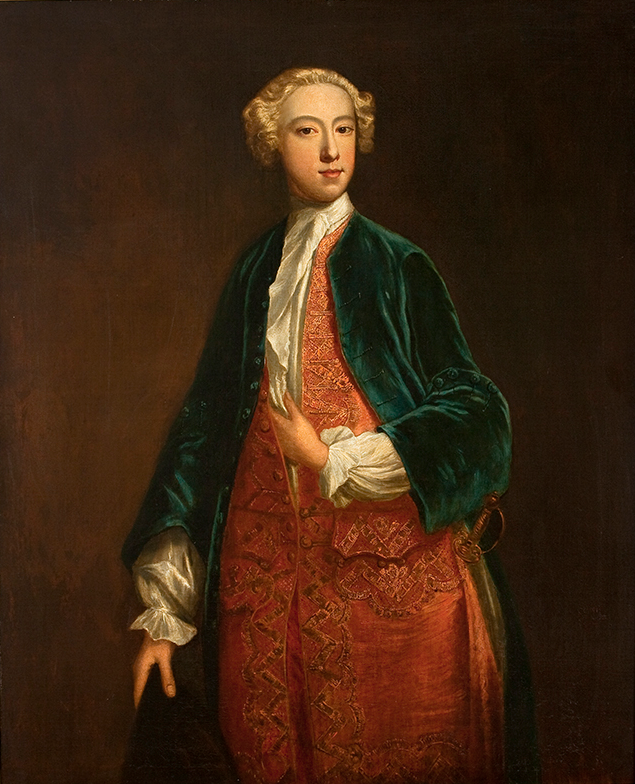
Walpole by Jonathan Richardson, 1735.

Walpole was born in London, the youngest son of British Prime Minister Sir Robert Walpole and his wife, Catherine. Like his father, he received early education in Bexley; in part under Edward Weston. He was also educated at Eton College and King's College, Cambridge.

Walpole's first friends were probably his cousins Francis and Henry Conway, to whom he became strongly attached, especially Henry. At Eton he formed a schoolboy confederacy, the "Triumvirate", with Charles Lyttelton (later an antiquary and bishop) and George Montagu (later a member of parliament and Private Secretary to Lord North). More important were another group of friends dubbed the "Quadruple Alliance": Walpole, Thomas Gray, Richard West, and Thomas Ashton.

At Cambridge, Walpole came under the influence of Conyers Middleton, an unorthodox theologian. Walpole came to accept the sceptical nature of Middleton's attitude to some essential Christian doctrines for the rest of his life, including a hatred of superstition and bigotry even though he was a nominal Anglican. Ceasing to reside at Cambridge at the end of 1738, Walpole left without taking a degree.

In 1737, Walpole's mother died. According to one biographer, his love for his mother "was the most powerful emotion of his entire life ... the whole of his psychological history was dominated by it". Walpole did not have any serious relationships with women; he has been called "a natural celibate".

His sexual orientation has been the subject of speculation. He never married, engaging in a succession of unconsummated flirtations with unmarriageable women, and counted among his close friends a number of women such as Anne Seymour Damer and Mary Berry named by a number of sources as lesbian.

Many contemporaries described him as effeminate (one political opponent called him "a hermaphrodite horse"). Biographers, such as W. S. Lewis, Brian Fothergill, and Robert Wyndham Ketton-Cremer, interpreted Walpole as asexual.

Walpole's father secured for him three sinecures which afforded him an income: in 1737 he was appointed Inspector of the Imports and Exports in the Custom House, which he resigned to become Usher of the Exchequer, which gave him at first £3900 per annum but this increased over the years. Upon coming of age he became Comptroller of the Pipe and Clerk of the Estreats which gave him an income of £300 per annum. Walpole decided to go travelling with Thomas Gray and wrote a will in which he left Gray all his belongings.

In 1744, he wrote in a letter to Conway that these offices gave him nearly £2,000 per annum; after 1745 when he was appointed Collectorship of Customs, his total income from these offices was around £3,400 per annum.

== Grand Tour: 1739–1741 ==
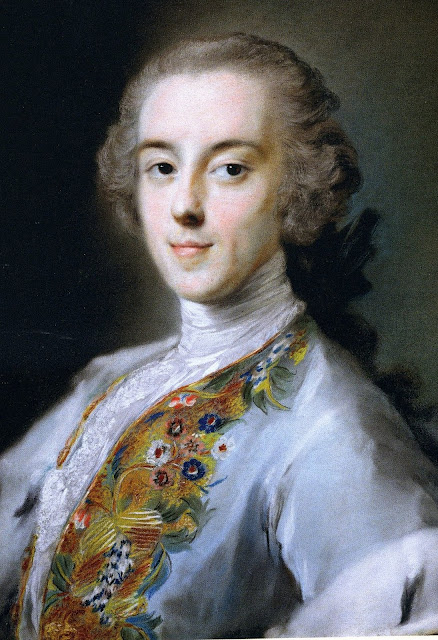
Walpole by Rosalba Carriera, c. 1741.

Walpole went on the Grand Tour with Gray, but as Walpole recalled in later life: "We had not got to Calais before Gray was dissatisfied, for I was a boy, and he, though infinitely more a man, was not enough to make allowances".

They left Dover on 29 March and arrived at Calais later that day. They then travelled through Boulogne, Amiens and Saint-Denis, arriving at Paris on 4 April. Here they met many aristocratic Englishmen. In early June they left Paris for Reims, then in September going to Dijon, Lyon, Dauphiné, Savoy, Aix-les-Bains, Geneva, and then back to Lyon.

In October they left for Italy, arriving in Turin in November, then going to Genoa, Piacenza, Parma, Reggio, Modena, Bologna, and in December arriving at Florence. Here he struck up a friendship with Horace Mann, an assistant to the British Minister at the Court of Tuscany. In Florence he also wrote Epistle from Florence to Thomas Ashton, Esq., Tutor to the Earl of Plymouth, a mixture of Whig history and Middleton's teachings. In February 1740, Walpole and Gray left for Rome with the intention of witnessing the papal conclave upon the death of Pope Clement XII but never saw it. Walpole wanted to attend fashionable parties and Gray wanted to visit antiquities. At social occasions in Rome, he saw the Old Pretender, James Francis Edward Stuart, and his two sons, Charles Edward Stuart and Henry Stuart, although there is no record of them conversing.

Walpole and Gray returned to Florence in July. However, Gray disliked the idleness of Florence as compared to the educational pursuits in Rome, and animosity grew between them, eventually leading to an end to their friendship. On their way back to England they had a furious argument, although it is unknown what it was about. Gray went to Venice, leaving Walpole at Reggio. In later life Walpole admitted that the fault lay primarily with himself:

I was too young, too fond of my own diversions, nay, I do not doubt, too much intoxicated by indulgence, vanity, and the insolence of my situation, as a Prime Minister's son, not to have been inattentive and insensible to the feelings of one I thought below me; of one, I blush to say it, that I knew was obliged to me; of one whom presumption and folly perhaps made me deem not my superior then in parts, though I have since felt my infinite inferiority to him.

— Ketton-Cremer 1964, p. 71

Walpole then visited Venice, Genoa, Antibes, Toulon, Marseille, Aix, Montpellier, Toulouse, Orléans and Paris. He returned to England on 12 September 1741, reaching London on the 14th.

== Early parliamentary career: 1741–1754 ==
By 1735, Walpole was a student at King's College, Cambridge. He had long periods of absence from the college, often returning to Norwich to live at Houghton Hall, in Norfolk. Interested in local politics, he and the "wealthy" Mayor of Norwich, Philip Meadows, encouraged local merchant Thomas Vere to run for a seat in Parliament "in the Whig interest" with Vere becoming the MP for Norwich in 1735.

At the 1741 general election Walpole was elected as a Member of Parliament for the rotten borough of Callington, Cornwall. He held this seat for thirteen years although he never visited Callington. Walpole entered Parliament shortly before his father's fall from power. In December 1741 the Opposition won its first majority vote in the Commons for twenty years. In January 1742, Walpole's government was still struggling in Parliament, although by the end of the month, Horace and other family members had successfully urged the prime minister to resign after a parliamentary defeat. Walpole's philosophy mirrored that of Edmund Burke, who was his contemporary. He was a classical liberal on issues such as slavery and the American Revolution.

Walpole delivered his maiden speech on 19 March against the successful motion that a Secret Committee be set up to enquire into Sir Robert Walpole's last ten years as prime minister. For the next three years, Walpole spent most of his time with his father at his country house Houghton Hall in Norfolk. His father died in 1745 and left Walpole the remainder of the lease of his house in Arlington Street, London; £5,000 in cash; and the office of Collector of the Customs (worth £1,000 per annum). However, he had died in debt, the total of which was in between £40,000 and £50,000.

In late 1745 Walpole and Gray resumed their friendship. Also that year the Jacobite Rising began. The position of Walpole was the fruit of his father's support for the Hanoverian dynasty and he knew that he was in danger:

"Now comes the Pretender's boy, and promises all my comfortable apartments in the Exchequer and Custom House to some forlorn Irish peer, who chooses to remove his pride and poverty out of some large old unfurnished gallery at St. Germain's. Why really, Mr. Montagu, this is not pleasant! I shall wonderfully dislike being a loyal sufferer in a threadbare coat, and shivering in an antechamber at Hanover, or reduced to teach Latin and English to the young princes at Copenhagen".

In November 1749, Walpole was robbed at gunpoint by notorious highwaymen James MacLaine and William Plunkett. He wrote of the event:

"One night, in the beginning of November 1749, as I was returning from Holland House by moonlight, about ten o'clock, I was attacked by two highwaymen in Hyde Park, and the pistol of one of them going off accidentally, raised the skin under my eye, left some marks of shot in my face, and stunned me. The ball went through the top of the chariot, and if I had sat an inch nearer to the left side, must have gone through my head."

== Strawberry Hill ==
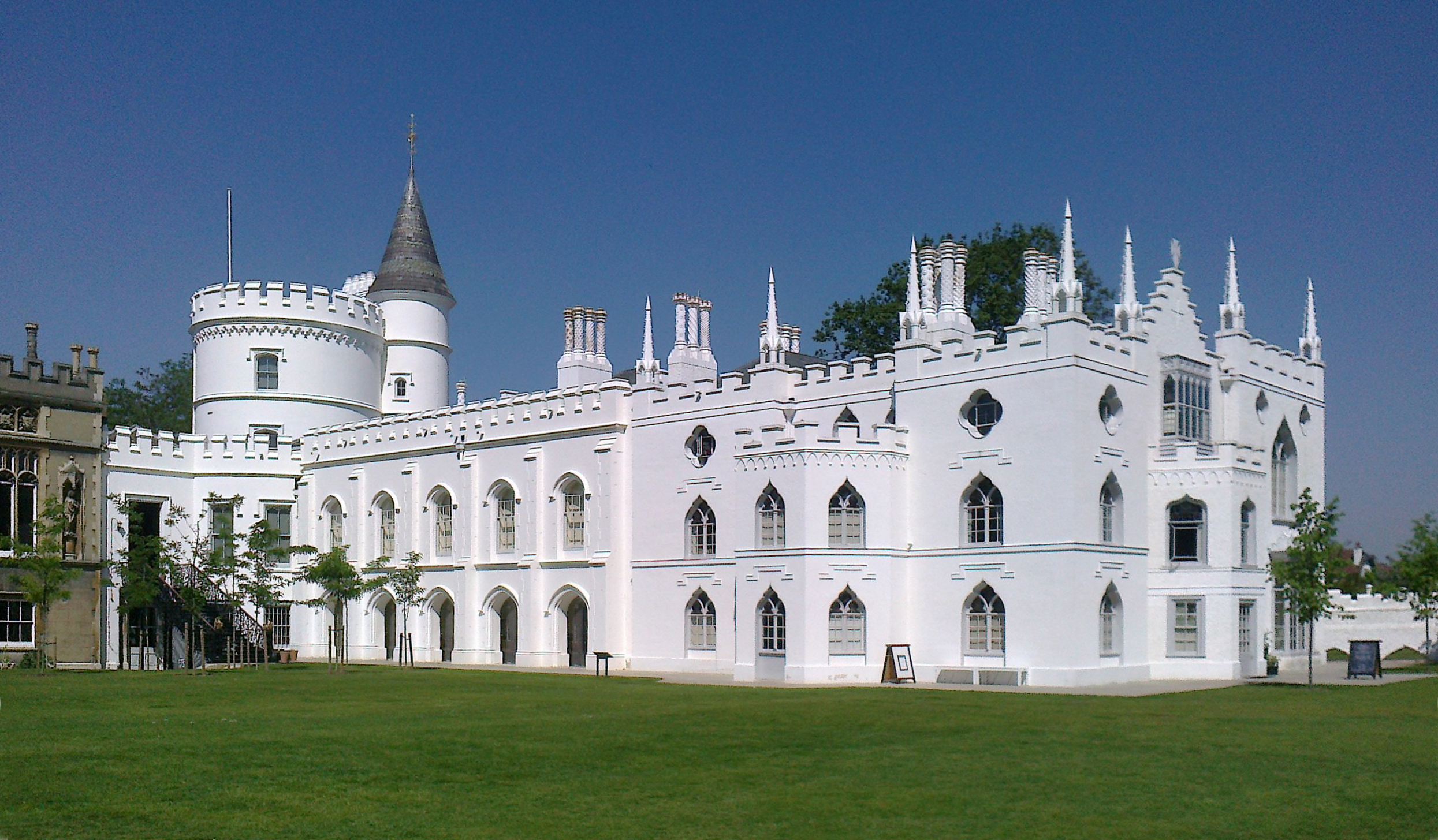
Strawberry Hill House in Twickenham

Walpole's lasting architectural creation is Strawberry Hill, the home he built from 1749 onward in Twickenham, southwest of London, which at the time overlooked the Thames. Here he revived the Gothic style many decades before his Victorian successors. Derided thereafter by his friends as "The Abbot of Strawberry", this fanciful neo-Gothic concoction began a new architectural trend. Long-connected with the Blue Stockings Society, Walpole played host to its members and associates at Strawberry Hill, including Anna Laetitia Barbauld in 1774.

== Later parliamentary career: 1754–1768 ==
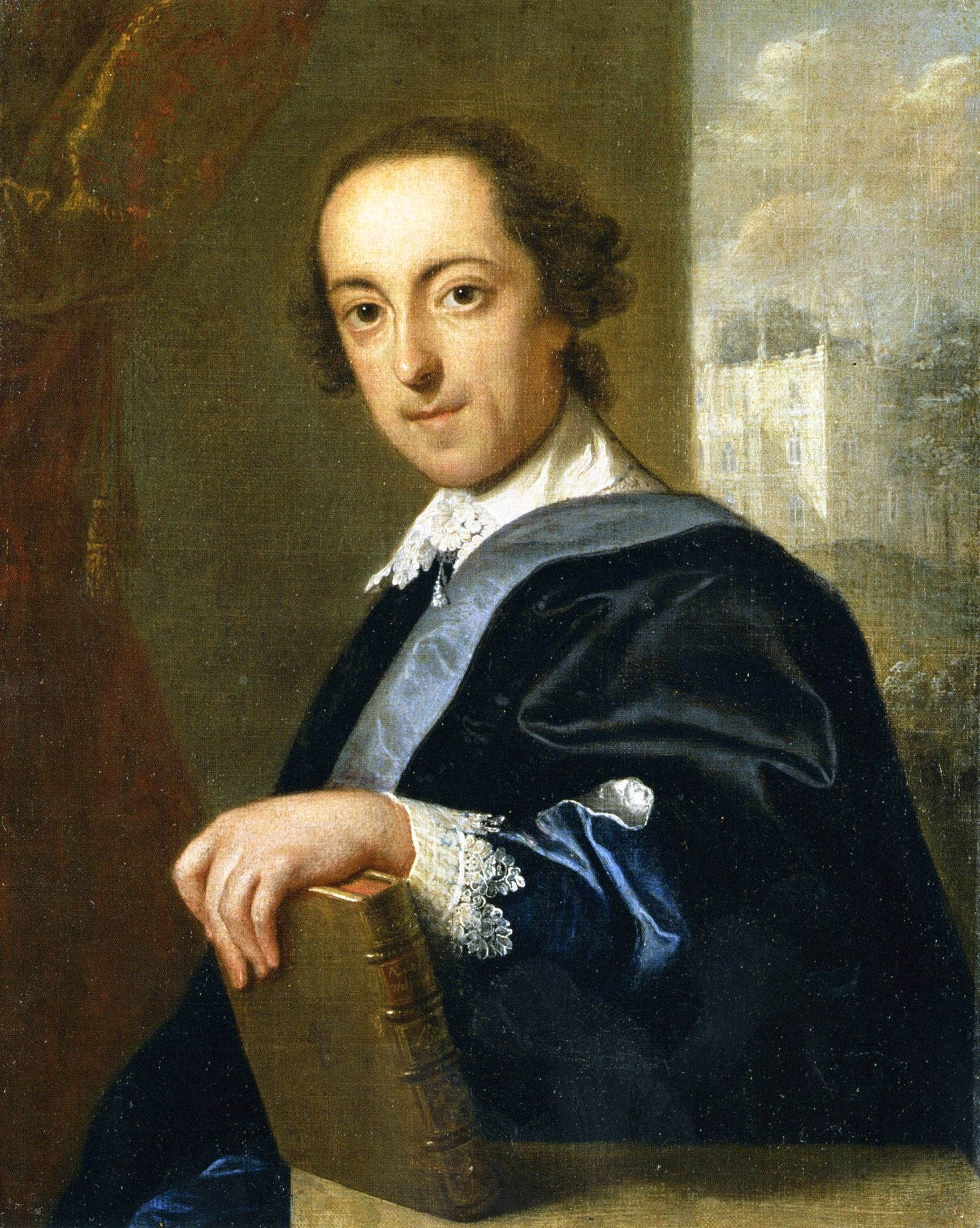
Horace Walpole by John Giles Eccardt, c. 1755.

In the House of Commons, Walpole represented one of the many rotten boroughs, Castle Rising, which consisted of underlying freeholds in four villages near Kings Lynn, Norfolk, from 1754 until 1757. At his home, he hung a copy of the warrant for the execution of King Charles I with the inscription "Major Charta" and wrote of "the least bad of all murders, that of a King". In 1756 he wrote:

I am sensible that from the prostitution of patriotism, from the art of ministers who have had the address to exalt the semblance while they depressed the reality of royalty, and from the bent of the education of the young nobility, which verges to French maxims and to a military spirit, nay, from the ascendant which the nobility itself acquires each day in this country, from all these reflections, I am sensible, that prerogative and power have been exceedingly fortified of late within the circle of the palace; and though fluctuating ministers by turns exercise the deposit, yet there it is; and whenever a prince of design and spirit shall sit in the regal chair, he will find a bank, a hoard of power, which he may lay off most fatally against this constitution. [I am] a quiet republican, who does not dislike to see the shadow of monarchy, like Banquo's ghost, fill the empty chair of state, that the ambitious, the murderer, the tyrant, may not aspire to it; in short, who approves the name of a King, when it excludes the essence.

— Ketton-Cremer 1964, p. 127

Walpole worried that while his fellow Whigs fought amongst themselves, the Tories were gaining power, the result of which would be England delivered to an unlimited, absolute monarchy, "that authority, that torrent which I should in vain extend a feeble arm to stem".

In 1757, he wrote the anonymous pamphlet A Letter from Xo Ho, a Chinese Philosopher at London, to his Friend Lien Chi at Peking, the first of his works to be widely reviewed.

In early 1757, old Horace Walpole of Wolterton died and was succeeded in the peerage by his son, who was then an MP for King's Lynn, thereby creating a vacancy. The electors of King's Lynn did not wish to be represented by a stranger and instead wanted someone with a connection to the Walpole family. The new Lord Walpole, therefore, wrote to his cousin requesting that he stand for the seat, saying his friends "were all unanimously of opinion that you were the only person who from your near affinity to my grandfather, whose name is still in the greatest veneration, and your own known personal abilities and qualifications, could stand in the gap on this occasion and prevent opposition and expense and perhaps disgrace to the family".

In early 1757, Walpole was out of Parliament after vacating Castle Rising until his election that year to King's Lynn, a seat he would hold until his retirement from the Commons in 1768.

Walpole became a prominent opponent of the 1757 decision to execute Admiral John Byng.

== Later life: 1768–1788 ==
Without a seat in Parliament, Walpole recognised his limitations as to political influence.

He wrote to Mann critical of the activities of the East India Company on 13 July 1773:

What is England now? – A sink of Indian wealth, filled by nabobs and emptied by Maccaronis! A senate sold and despised! A country overrun by horse-races! A gaming, robbing, wrangling, railing nation without principles, genius, character or allies.

— Walpole 1844, p. 339, Carson 2012, pp. 18–33

He opposed the recent Catholic accommodative measures, writing to Mann in 1784: "You know I have ever been averse to toleration of an intolerant religion". He wrote to the same correspondent in 1785 that "as there are continually allusions to parliamentary speeches and events, they are often obscure to me till I get them explained; and besides, I do not know several of the satirized heroes even by sight". His political sympathies were with the Foxite Whigs, the successors of the Rockingham Whigs, who were themselves the successors of the Whig Party as revived by Walpole's father. He wrote to William Mason, expounding his political philosophy:

I have for five and forty years acted upon the principles of the constitution as it was settled at the Revolution, the best form of government that I know of in the world, and which made us a free people, a rich people, and a victorious people, by diffusing liberty, protecting property and encouraging commerce; and by the combination of all, empowering us to resist the ambition of the House of Bourbon, and to place ourselves on a level with that formidable neighbour. The narrow plan of royalty, which had so often preferred the aggrandizement of the Crown to the dignity of presiding over a great and puissant free kingdom, threw away one predominant source of our potency by aspiring to enslave America—and would now compensate for that blunder and its consequence by assuming a despotic tone at home. It has found a tool in the light and juvenile son of the great minister who carried our glory to its highest pitch—but it shall never have the insignificant approbation of an old and worn out son of another minister, who though less brilliant, maintained this country in the enjoyment of the twenty happiest years that England ever enjoyed.

— Langford 2011

== Last years: 1788–1797 ==
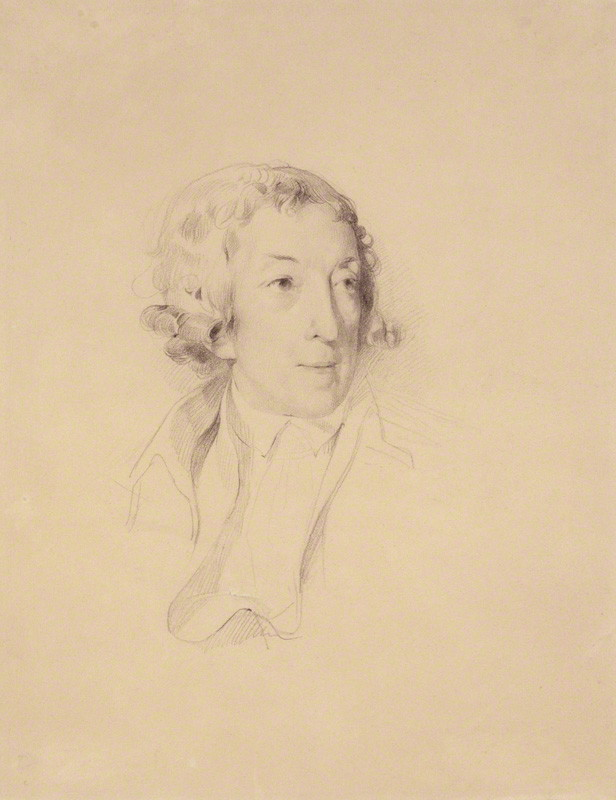
Horace Walpole by Sir Thomas Lawrence, c. 1795

Walpole was horrified by the French Revolution and commended Edmund Burke's Reflections on the Revolution in France: "Every page shows how sincerely he is in earnest — a wondrous merit in a political pamphlet—All other party writers act zeal for the public, but it never seems to flow from the heart". He admired the purple passage in the book on Marie Antoinette: "I know the tirade on the Queen of France is condemned and yet I must avow I admire it much. It paints her exactly as she appeared to me the first time I saw her when Dauphiness. She...shot through the room like an aerial being, all brightness and grace and without seeming to touch earth".

After he heard of the execution of King Louis XVI he wrote to Lady Ossory on 29 January 1793:

Indeed, Madam, I write unwillingly; there is not a word left in my Dictionary that can express what I feel. Savages, barbarians, &c., were terms for poor ignorant Indians and Blacks and Hyaenas, or, with some superlative epithets, for Spaniards in Peru and Mexico, for Inquisitors, or for Enthusiasts of every breed in religious wars. It remained for the enlightened eighteenth century to baffle language and invent horrors that can be found in no vocabulary. What tongue could be prepared to paint a Nation that should avow Atheism, profess Assassination, and practice Massacres on Massacres for four years together: and who, as if they had destroyed God as well as their King, and established Incredulity by law, give no symptoms of repentance! These Monsters talk of settling a Constitution—it may be a brief one, and couched in one Law, "Thou shalt reverse every Precept of Morality and Justice, and do all the Wrong thou canst to all Mankind".

— Ketton-Cremer 1964, pp. 305–306

He was not impressed with Thomas Paine's reply to Burke, Rights of Man, writing that it was "so coarse, that you would think he means to degrade the language as much as the government".

His father was created Earl of Orford in 1742. Horace's elder brother, Robert Walpole, 2nd Earl of Orford (c. 1701–1751), passed the title on to his son, George Walpole, 3rd Earl of Orford (1730–1791). When the 3rd Earl died unmarried, Horace Walpole became, at the age of 74, the 4th Earl of Orford, and the title died with him in 1797. The massive amount of correspondence he left behind has been published in many volumes, starting in 1798. Likewise, a large collection of his works, including historical writings, was published immediately after his death.

Horace Walpole was buried in the same location as his father Sir Robert Walpole, at the Church of St Martin at Tours on the Houghton Hall estate.

== Rumours of paternity ==
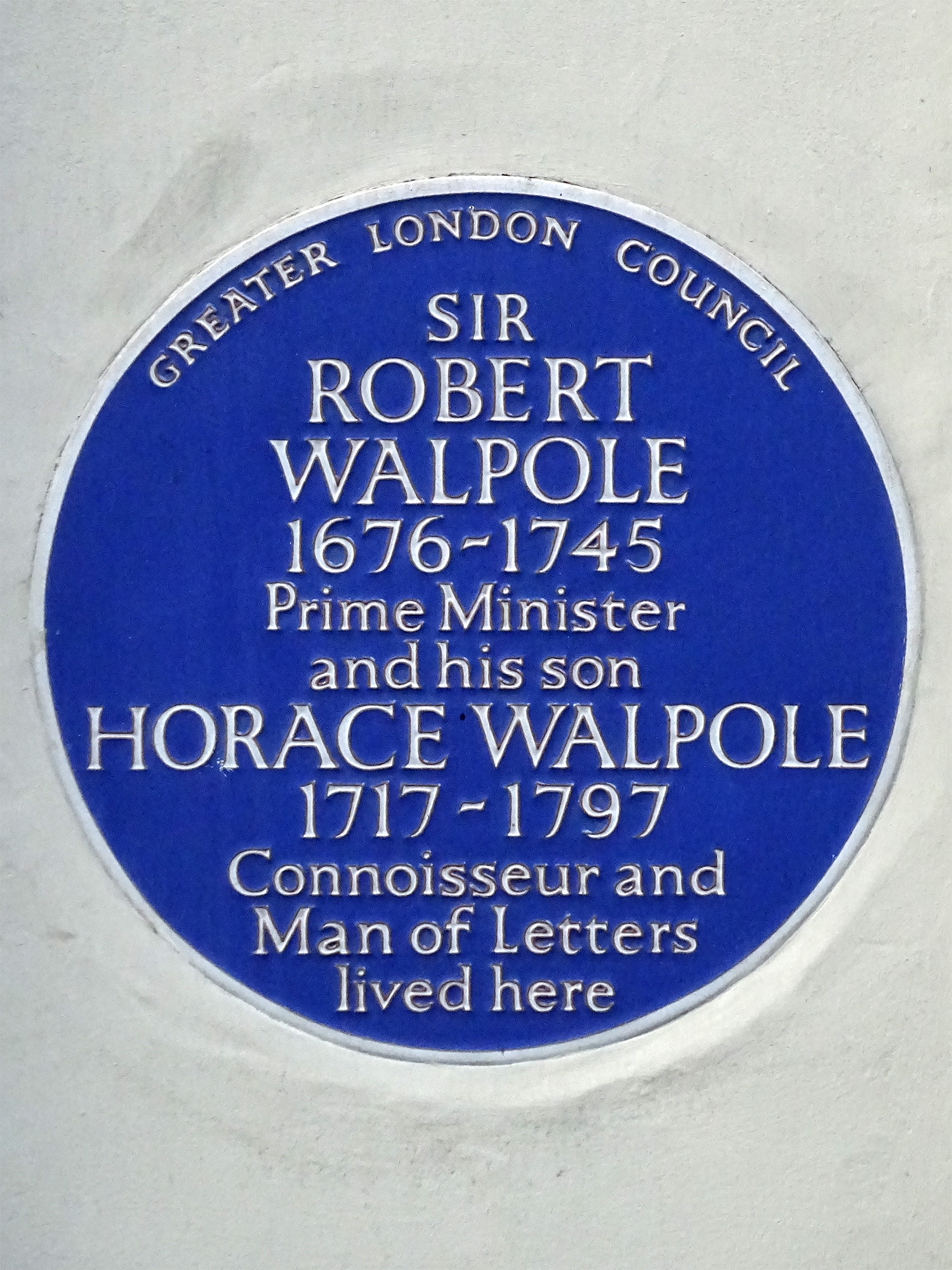
Blue plaque at Arlington Street, City of Westminster, London commemorating Horace and his father Robert

After Walpole's death, Lady Louisa Stuart, in the introduction to the letters of her grandmother, Lady Mary Wortley Montagu (1837), wrote of rumours that Horace's biological father was not Sir Robert Walpole but Carr, Lord Hervey (1691–1723), elder half-brother of the more famous John Hervey. T. H. White writes: "Catherine Shorter, Sir Robert Walpole's first wife, had five children. Four of them were born in a sequence after the marriage; the fifth, Horace, was born eleven years later, at a time when she was known to be on bad terms with Sir Robert, and known to be on romantic terms with Carr, Lord Hervey." The lack of physical resemblance between Horace and Sir Robert, and his close resemblance to members of the Hervey family, encouraged these rumours. Peter Cunningham, in his introduction to the letters of Horace Walpole (1857), vol. 1, p. x, wrote:

"[Lady Louisa Stuart] has related it in print in the Introductory Anecdotes to Lady Mary's Works; and there is too much reason to believe that what she tells is true. Horace was born eleven years after the birth of any other child that Sir Robert had by his wife; in every respect he was unlike a Walpole, and in every respect, figure and formation of mind, very like a Hervey. Lady Mary Wortley divided mankind into men, women, and Herveys, and the division has been generally accepted. Walpole was certainly of the Hervey class. Lord Hervey's Memoirs and Horace Walpole's Memoires are most remarkably alike, yet Walpole never saw them. [Yet] we have no evidence whatever that a suspicion of spurious parentage ever crossed the mind of Horace Walpole. His writings, from youth to age, breathe the most affectionate love for his mother, and the most unbounded filial regard for Sir Robert Walpole."

== Personal characteristics ==
Walpole formed a number of lifelong friendships with a number of men and women notable for their looks, wit or social standing. Principal amongst those in his inner circle was arguably Conway, whom he had looked up to since his Eton days and corresponded with for the rest of his life. He entertained himself with others who were like himself, and who possessed notoriety and wit, such as Etheldreda Townshend, and George Selwyn with whom he jousted and derided with streams of invective. The "Abbot of Strawberry" immortalised himself in his own words, and also inspired the characters of "Sir Benjamin Backbite? in Richard Brinsley Sheridan's The School for Scandal and "Monsieur Le Sage" in the satire Ranelagh House: a Satire in prose after the manner of Monsieur Le Sage.

The novelist Laetitia Matilda Hawkins, a younger contemporary of Walpole, wrote of him as follows:

His entrance into a room was in that style of affected delicacy, which fashion had made almost natural, chapeau bras between his hands as if he wished to compress it, or under his arm; knees bent, and feet on tip-toe, as if afraid of a wet floor. His summer dress of ceremony was usually a lavender suit, the waistcoat embroidered with a little silver, or of white silk worked in the tambour, partridge silk stockings, gold buckles, ruffles and lace frill. In the winter he wore powder ... His appearance at the breakfast table was proclaimed, and attended, by a fat and favourite little dog, the legacy of Madame du Deffand; the dog and favourite squirrel partook of his breakfast. He generally dined at four ... His dinner when at home was of chicken, pheasant, or any light food, of which he ate sparingly. Pastry he disliked, as difficult of digestion, though he would taste a morsel of venison pie. Iced water, then a London dislike, was his favourite drink. The scent of dinner was removed by a censer or pot of frankincense. The wine that was drunk during dinner. After his coffee he would take a pinch of snuff, and nothing more that night.

In his old age, according to G. G. Cunningham, he "was afflicted with fits of an hereditary gout which a rigid temperance failed to remove".

== Writings ==
Strawberry Hill had its own printing press, the Strawberry Hill Press, which supported Horace Walpole's intensive literary activity.

In 1764, not using his own press, he anonymously published his Gothic novel, The Castle of Otranto, claiming on its title page that it was a translation "from the Original Italian of Onuphrio Muralto". The second edition's preface, according to James Watt, "has often been regarded as a manifesto for the modern Gothic romance, stating that his work, now subtitled 'A Gothic Story', sought to restore the qualities of imagination and invention to contemporary fiction". However, there is a playfulness in the prefaces to both editions and in the narration within the text itself. The novel opens with the son of Manfred (the Prince of Otranto) being crushed under a massive helmet that appears as a result of supernatural causes. However, that moment, along with the rest of the unfolding plot, includes a mixture of both ridiculous and sublime supernatural elements. The plot finally reveals how Manfred's family is tainted in a way that served as a model for successive Gothic plots.

From 1762 on, Walpole published his Anecdotes of Painting in England, based on George Vertue's manuscript notes. His memoirs of the Georgian social and political scene, though heavily biased, are a useful primary source for historians.

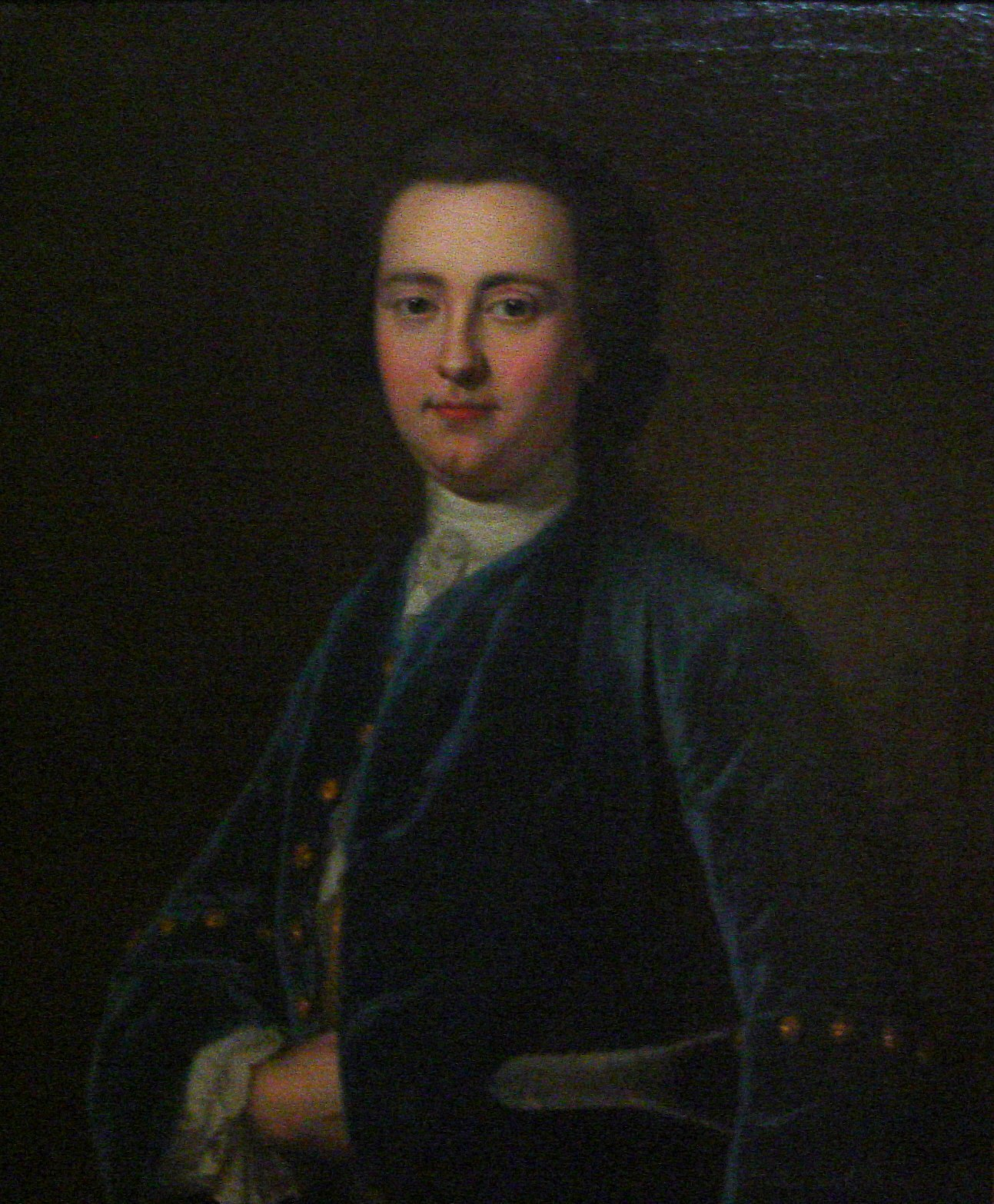
Portrait of George Montagu by John Giles Eccardt after Jean-Baptiste van Loo (c. 1713–1780) Peterborough Museum and Art Gallery A close friend and correspondent of Horace Walpole

Smith, noting that Walpole never did any work for his well-paid government sinecures, turns to the letters and argues that:

Walpole served his country, not by drudgery in the Exchequer and Customs, which paid him, but by transmitting to posterity an incomparable vision of England as it was in his day – London and Westminster with all their festivities and riots, the machinations of politicians and the turmoil of elections.

Walpole's numerous letters are often used as a historical resource. In one, dating from 28 January 1754, he coined the word serendipity which he said was derived from a "silly fairy tale" he had read, The Three Princes of Serendip. The oft-quoted epigram, "This world is a comedy to those that think, a tragedy to those that feel", is from a letter of Walpole's to Anne, Countess of Upper Ossory, on 16 August 1776. The original, fuller version appeared in a letter to Sir Horace Mann on 31 December 1769: "I have often said, and oftener think, that this world is a comedy to those that think, a tragedy to those that feel – a solution of why Democritus laughed and Heraclitus wept."

In Historic Doubts on the Life and Reign of King Richard III (1768), Walpole defended Richard III against the common belief that he murdered the Princes in the Tower. In this he has been followed by other writers, such as Josephine Tey and Valerie Anand. This work, according to Emile Legouis, shows that Walpole was "capable of critical initiative". However, Walpole later changed his views following The Terror and declared that Richard could have committed the crimes of which he was accused.

== Arms ==
Coat of arms of Horace Walpole
Crest The bust of a man in profile couped proper, ducally crowned or, from the coronet flowing a long cap turned forwards gules tasselled and charged with a catherine wheel gold. Escutcheon Or, on a fess between. two chevrons sable, three crosses crosslet of the first. Supporters Dexter, an antelope; sinister, a stag argent, attired proper, each gorged with a collar chequy or and azure chained gold. Motto Fari quæ sentiat (To speak what he feels).

== Walpole Society ==
The Walpole Society was formed in 1911 to promote the study of the history of British art. Its headquarters is located in the Department of Prints and Drawings at The British Museum and its director is Simon Swynfen Jervis.

== Works ==
=== Non-fiction ===
- A Letter from Xo Ho, a Chinese Philosopher at London, to his Friend Lien Chi at Peking (2nd ed.). London: Printed for J. Graham, Strand. 1757.
- Anecdotes of Painting in England. London: Ward Lock & Co. 1879 [1762–71].
- A Catalogue of Engravers who have been born, or resided in England. London: Printed for J. Dodsley, Pall Mall. 1782 [1763].
- Essay on Modern Gardening. With a faithful translation into French by The Duke of Nivernois and an introduction by Alice Morse Earle (Facsimile reprint ed.). Canton, Pa.: Kirgate Press. 1904 [1780].
- A Description of the Villa of Mr. Horace Walpole. Strawberry Hill, Twickenham: Printed by Thomas Kirgate. 1784.
- Historic Doubts on the life and Reign of King Richard the Third (Second ed.). London: Printed by J. Dodsley in Pall Mall. 1768.
- Park, Thomas, ed. (1806) [1758]. A Catalogue of the Royal and Noble Authors of England, Scotland, and Ireland, enlarged and continued to the present time. London: Printed for John Scott, Strand. Vol. 1 • Vol. 2 • Vol. 3 • Vol. 4 • Vol. 5 • (1st edition: Vol. 1 • Vol. 2)
- Vassall-Fox, Henry, 3rd Baron Holland, ed. (1847) [1822]. Memoirs of the Last Ten Years of the Reign of King George the Second. (posthumously published.) (3 vols.: 2nd, revised ed.). London: Henry Colburn. Vol. 1 • Vol. 2 • Vol. 3 (reprint of 1st ed., 1846)
- Jarrett, Keith, ed. (2000) [1845]. Memoirs of the Reign of King George III. (4 vols). New Haven and London: Yale University Press. ISBN 0-300-07014-4. Vol. 1 • Vol. 2 • Vol. 3 • Vol. 4
- Walpole, Horace (1903–1925). Toynbee, Helen Wrigley (ed.). Letters of Horace Walpole, Earl of Orford. (16 vols. 1903-5, Supplement, ed. Paget Toynbee, 3 vols., 1918–1925). Oxford: Clarendon Press. Vol. 1 • Vol. 2 • Vol. 3 • Vol. 4 (bound with Vol. 3) • Vol. 5 • Vol. 6 • Vol. 7 • Vol. 8 • Vol. 9 • Vol. 10 • Vol. 11 • Vol. 12 • Vol. 13 • Vol. 14 • Vol. 15 • Vol. 16 • Suppl. Vol. 1 • Suppl. Vol. 2 • Suppl. Vol. 3
- Toynbee, Helen Wrigley, ed. (1912). Lettres de la Marquise du Deffand à Horace Walpole (1766–1780). 3 vols. (Completed by her husband Paget Toynbee after her death in 1910) (in French). Methuen & Co. Vol. 1 • Vol. 2 • Vol. 3
- Selected Letters, edited and introduced by Stephen Clarke. New York: Everyman's Library, Alfred A. Knopf, 2017. Reviewed by Margaret Drabble

=== Fiction ===
- The Castle of Otranto (1764)
- The Mysterious Mother: A Tragedy (1768)
- Hieroglyphic Tales (1785)

Parliament of Great Britain
Preceded by Thomas Coplestone; Isaac le Heup	Member of Parliament for Callington; 1741–1754; With: Thomas Coplestone (1741–1748); Edward Bacon (1748–1754)	Succeeded by Sewallis Shirley; John Sharpe
Preceded by The Lord Luxborough; Thomas Howard	Member of Parliament for Castle Rising; 1754–1757; With: Thomas Howard	Succeeded by Thomas Howard; Charles Boone
Preceded by Sir John Turner, Bt; Horatio Walpole	Member of Parliament for Kings Lynn; 1757–1768; With: Sir John Turner, Bt	Succeeded by Sir John Turner, Bt; Thomas Walpole
Peerage of Great Britain
Preceded by George Walpole	Earl of Orford; 2nd creation 1791–1797	Extinct
Preceded by George Walpole	Viscount Walpole; 1791–1797	Extinct
Preceded by George Walpole	Baron Walpole of Houghton; 1791–1797	Extinct
Preceded by George Walpole	Baron Walpole of Walpole; 1791–1797	Succeeded by Horatio Walpole
