= Edward Bacon (died 1786) =

British lawyer and politician

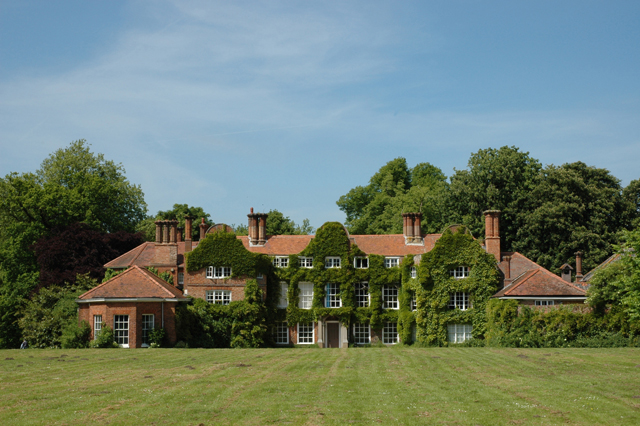
Earlham Hall

Edward Bacon (c. 1712–1786) was a British lawyer and politician who sat in the House of Commons between 1748 and 1784.

Bacon was the son of Waller Bacon of Earlham, Norfolk. He entered Gray's Inn in 1731. His father died in 1734 and he inherited Earlham Hall. In 1738 he was called to the bar. He married Elizabeth Knight of Southampton on 4 September 1742.

Bacon's father had represented Norwich from 1705 to 1734 and in 1739 Bacon was invited to stand with Tory support against the sitting Whig Members for the town. He waited until he had consulted Horace Walpole, the senior sitting Member, who arranged for him to be brought in as Member of Parliament for Kings Lynn in 1742, sitting until the 1747 general election. He was then returned as MP for Callington in a by-election on 21 April 1748 on the Walpole interest. He became Steward of Norwich in 1750 and recorder in 1752, holding the post until 1783.

In 1754 Bacon was again invited to stand for Norwich, but declined in order to oblige Pelham, who provided him with another seat at Newport in the 1754 general election. He became bencher of his Inn in 1755. When Walpole was raised to the peerage, Bacon was finally elected MP for Norwich in a by-election on 25 June 1756. He was chairman of committee of privileges and elections from 1758 to 1770. He became Lord of Trade in December 1759 and zealously applied himself to its work, remaining in office until 1765 with an attendance at Board meetings during that time of nearly 80 per cent.

At the 1761 general election Bacon and Harbord were opposed by two Norwich aldermen whom they easily defeated. Bacon never held any public office after 1765. He was returned for Norwich again in a contest in 1768 and returned uncontested in 1774. The 1780 election was however closely contested, and Bacon kept his seat only by a narrow margin. The English Chronicle acknowledged in a note on him in 1781: "Edward Bacon ... is an intelligent sensible man, perfectly conversant in the intricacies of committee business, and skilled in all the branches of commercial information. He is vulgarly denominated a stickler, but as this appellation appears in him to be only an ill-natured mode of conveying an idea of indefatigable attention to every subject that comes within his cognizance, it will rather operate as a compliment than otherwise. He is firmly attached to Lord North, and is of course his friend in Parliament".

After 1780 no vote by him is recorded as he was too ill to attend. It was said of him in December 1783: "Mr. Bacon is so ill he can’t attend and can’t live long; perhaps may not wish to come in again".

He did not stand in 1784. Bacon was highly respectable, independent and diligent but apparently very dull. During his 41 years in Parliament he represented local interests indefatigably and his activities in Parliament centred on committee work. He is not known to have spoken in any major debate, and intervened very rarely.

Bacon died on 12 March 1786 and was buried at Earlham Church. He and his wife had no children.

== Sources ==
- Print of Edward Bacon, MP (d.1786)

Parliament of Great Britain
Preceded by Sir Robert Walpole; Sir John Turner	Member of Parliament for Kings Lynn; 1742– 1747; With: Sir John Turner	Succeeded by Horatio Walpole, junior Sir John Turner
Preceded by Thomas Coplestone; Hon. Horatio Walpole	Member of Parliament for Callington; 1748– 1754; With: Hon. Horatio Walpole	Succeeded by Hon. Sewallis Shirley; John Sharpe
Preceded by Nicholas Herbert; Thomas Bury	Member of Parliament for Newport; 1754–1756; With: John Lee	Succeeded by John Lee; Richard Bull
Preceded by Lord Hobart; Horatio Walpole	Member of Parliament for Norwich; 1756– 1784; With: Lord Hobart 1756 (Sir) Harbord Harbord1756-1784	Succeeded by (Sir) Harbord Harbord; William Windham
