= Robert Booth (MP for Bodmin) =

British lawyer and politician

Robert Booth (c. 1699–1733) was a British lawyer and opposition Whig politician who sat in the House of Commons from 1727 to 1733.

Booth was the eldest son of Hon. and Rev. Robert Booth, Dean of Bristol, and his wife Mary Hales, daughter of Thomas Hales of Howletts, Kent. He was educated at Westminster School in 1712 and matriculated at Christ Church, Oxford on 8 June 1716, aged 18. He was admitted at Middle Temple in 1716, and called to the bar in 1725. He succeeded his father in 1730.

At the 1727 British general election, Booth was returned as an opposition Whig Member of Parliament for Bodmin by his cousin, Henry Robartes, 3rd Earl of Radnor. He voted consistently against the Administration. On 10 March 1730 he seconded an opposition motion for an address to the King to dispossess the French from St Lucia, St Vincent and St Dominico in the West Indies.

Booth died unmarried on 25 January 1733.

Parliament of Great Britain
Preceded by Isaac le Heup; John LaRoche	Member of Parliament for Bodmin; 1727– 1733; With: John LaRoche	Succeeded by Sir John Heathcote; John LaRoche
