= Christopher Treise =

British Tory politician

Sir Christopher Treise (April 1728 – 4 December 1780) was a British Tory politician from Cornwall.

== Biography ==
Treise was the only surviving son of John Treise of Lavethan and Olympia, née Lark. He was educated at Exeter College, Oxford from 1747. He succeeded to his father's estates in 1755. In 1760 Treise served a term as High Sheriff of Cornwall, in which capacity he presented an address from Cornishmen upon the accession of George III, for which he was knighted on 23 February 1761.

Treise was returned as a Member of Parliament for Bodmin on his own interest at a by-election in 1762; he owned extensive estates surrounding the borough. In parliamentary lists compiled by John Stuart, 3rd Earl of Bute and Charles Watson-Wentworth, 2nd Marquess of Rockingham in 1766, Treise was classed as a Tory, which at this time meant an independent country gentleman. He was, nonetheless, recorded by Thomas Pelham-Holles, 1st Duke of Newcastle as a "sure friend" in May 1764 and March 1767. He was defeated in Bodmin at the 1768 British general election and did not stand again.

Upon his death in 1780, he left all his estates to the son of his only sister, Sir John Morshead, 1st Baronet.

Parliament of Great Britain
Preceded by John Parker; George Hunt	Member of Parliament for Bodmin; 1762–1768; With: George Hunt	Succeeded by James La Roche; George Hunt
