= Rycroft baronets =

Title in the Baronetage of Great Britain

- Escutcheon of the Rycroft baronets of Calton
- Creation date: 1784
- Status: extant

The Rycroft Baronetcy, of Calton in the County of York, is a title in the Baronetage of Great Britain. It was created on 22 January 1784 for the Rev. Richard Rycroft. At the time he was rector of Penshurst. He had been domestic chaplin to the Earls De La Warr. Born Richard Nelson, he was the surviving son of John Nelson, and had assumed by Royal sign-manual the surname of Ry(e)croft in lieu of his patronymic in 1758.

The 5th Baronet was High Sheriff of Hampshire in 1899, and the 6th Baronet in 1938.

== Rycroft baronets, of Calton (1784) ==
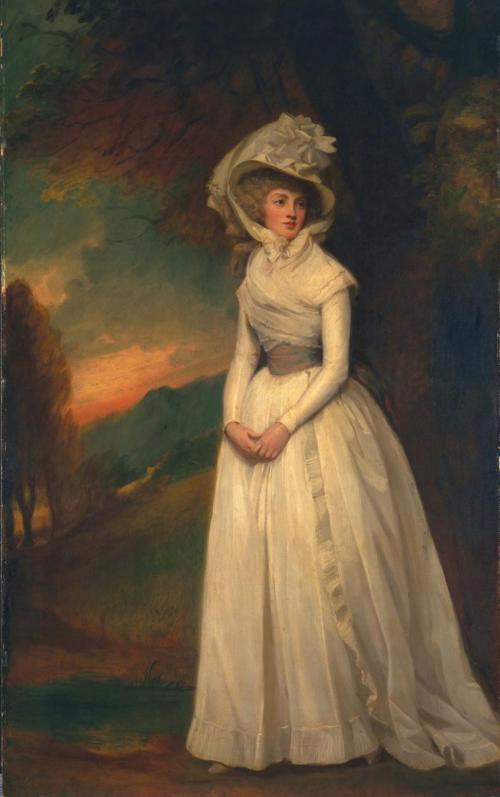
Penelope Rycroft was born on March 4, 1764, the eldest daughter among 11 children born to Penelope Stonehewer (1737–1821) and the Rev. Richard Rycroft of Calton, Yorkshire (anonymous portrait)

- The Rev. Sir Richard Rycroft, 1st Baronet (1736–1786)
- Sir Nelson Rycroft, 2nd Baronet (1761–1827)
- Sir Richard Henry Charles Rycroft, 3rd Baronet (1793–1864)
- Sir Nelson Rycroft, 4th Baronet (1831–1894)
- Sir Richard Nelson Rycroft, 5th Baronet (1859–1925) m (1stly) Lady Dorothea Hester Bluett Wallop, 11 Feb 1886 (2ndly), Emily Mary Lowry-Corry, 1 Feb 1911.
- Sir Nelson Edward Oliver Rycroft, 6th Baronet (1886–1958)
- Sir Richard Newton Rycroft, 7th Baronet (1918–1999)
- Sir Richard John Rycroft, 8th Baronet (born 1946)

The heir presumptive to the Baronetcy is Francis Edward Rycroft (born 1950), first cousin of the 8th baronet. His heir apparent is his son Michael Rycroft (born 1979).

== Extended family ==
- Sir William Henry Rycroft, second son of the 4th Baronet, was a Major-General in the British Army.
- The psychiatrist Charles Rycroft was the fifth son, and second son by his second marriage, of the 5th Baronet.

Baronetage of Great Britain
Preceded by Morshead baronets	Rycroft baronets of Calton; 22 January 1784	Succeeded by Smith baronets
