= Philip Hawkins (MP) =

Philip Hawkins (7 March 1701 – 6 September 1738), of Trewithen, near Grampound, Cornwall, was a British politician who sat in the House of Commons from 1727 to 1738.

Hawkins was born at Creed, Cornwall, the fourth son of Philip Hawkins, a wealthy attorney of Pennance, Cornwall, and his wife Mary Scobell, daughter of Richard Scobell of Menagwins, Cornwall. He was admitted at Pembroke College, Cambridge on 7 March 1716, aged 15, and admitted to the Middle Temple on 2 March 1717.

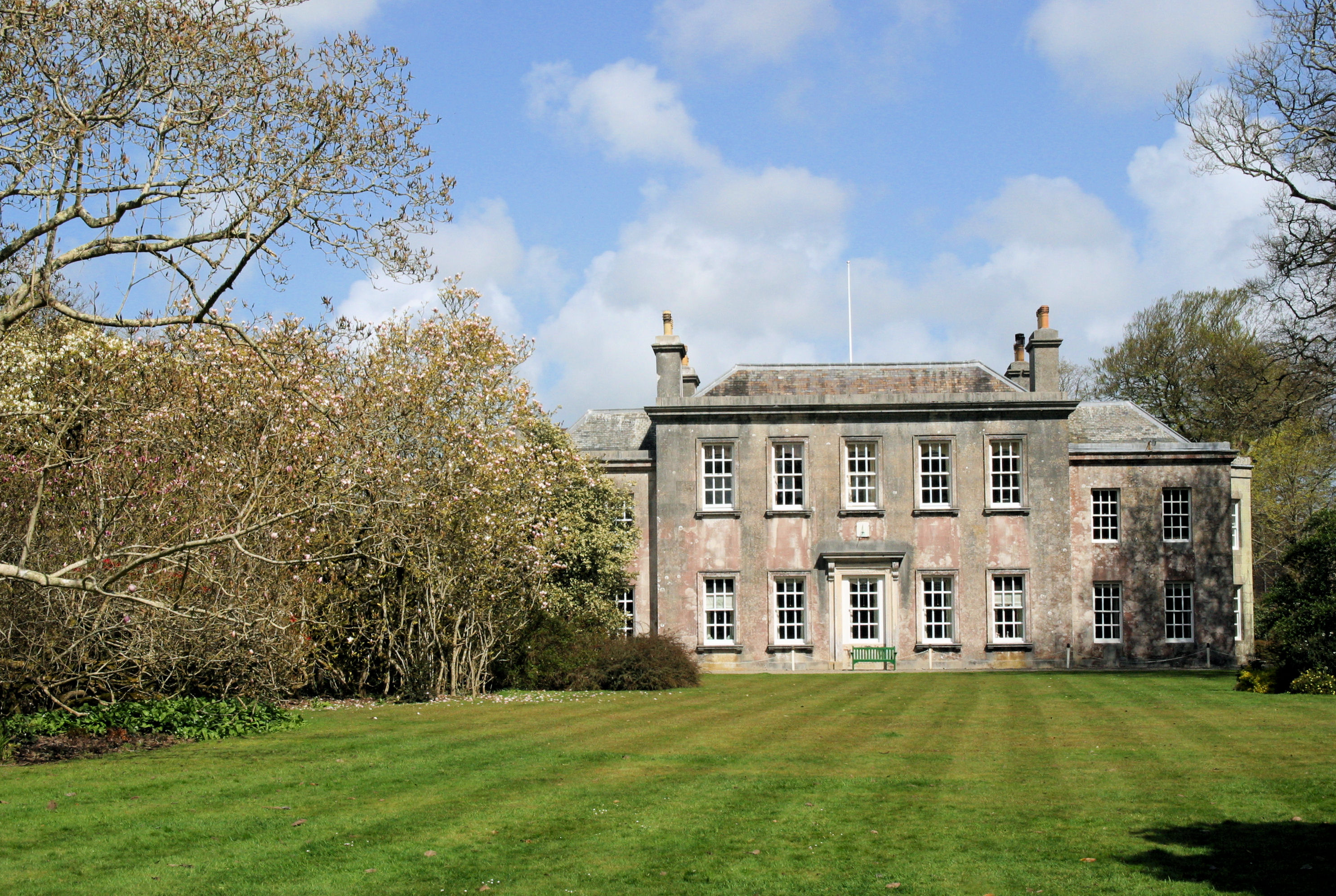
Trewithen House

Trewithen House, near Grampound was purchased in 1715 for £2,700 by Philip Hawkins, presumably Hawkins' father as Hawkins himself was under age, but it became his residence and improvements were made to the house in 1723. Hawkins was returned unopposed as Member of Parliament for Grampound at the 1727 British general election. He was returned again unopposed at the 1734 British general election. He voted against the Administration on every recorded occasion.

Hawkins died without issue at Truro on 6 September 1738, leaving Trewithen to his nephew Thomas Hawkins. He also bequeathed '£600 to his Majesty in lieu of his tenants having defrauded the Crown of about that sum in the customs'. His brother John was Master of Pembroke College, Cambridge between 1728 and 1733.

== Notes ==
Parliament of Great Britain
Preceded by Marquess of Hartington; Humphry Morice	Member of Parliament for Grampound; 1727–1738; With: Humphry Morice; Isaac le Heup 1732-1734; Thomas Hales1734-1738	Succeeded by Thomas Trefusis; Thomas Hales
