= George Hunt (MP) =

British politician

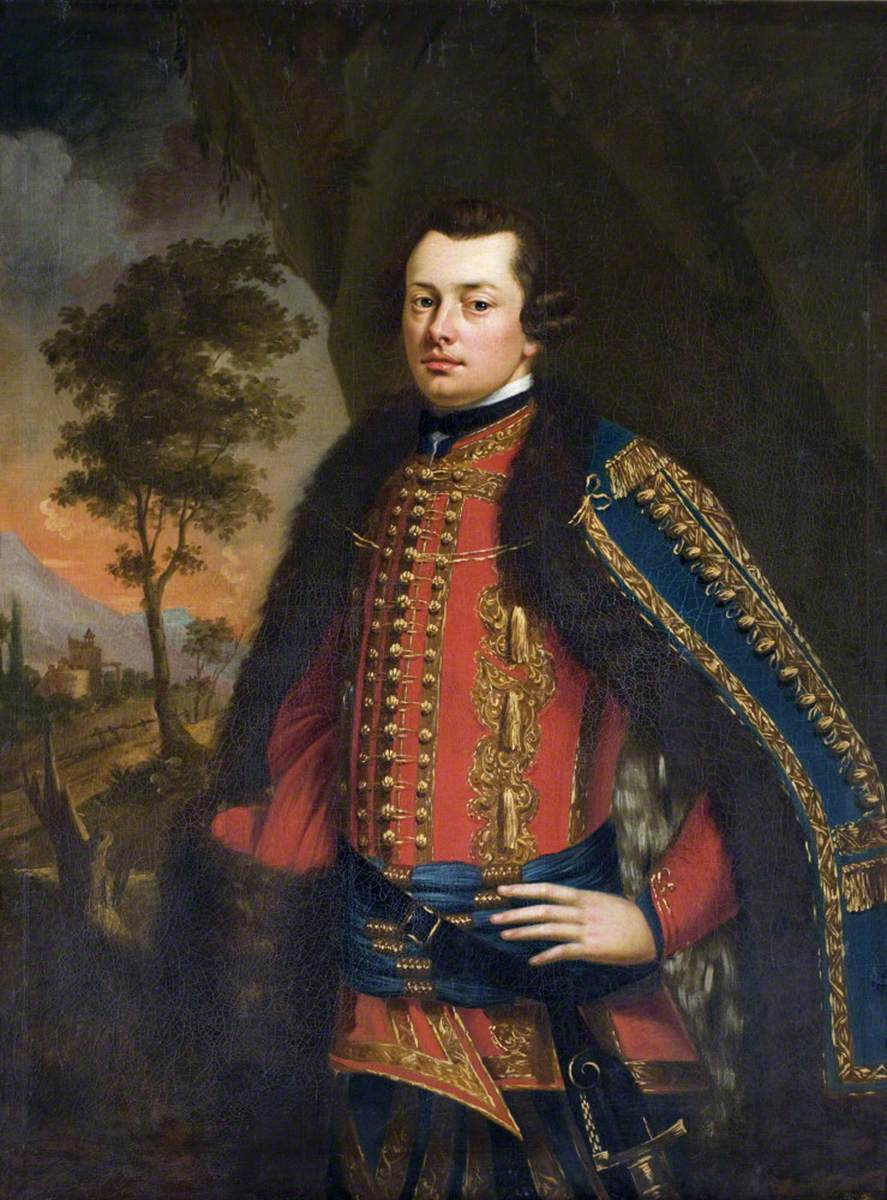
Hunt in Hussar uniform

George Hunt (c.1720–1798) was a British politician who sat in the House of Commons for 31 years from 1753 to 1784.

== Early life ==
Hunt was the son of Thomas Hunt of Mollington, Cheshire and his wife Mary Vere Robartes, daughter of Russell Robartes. He matriculated at Queen’s College, Oxford on 10 March 1738, aged 17.

In 1741, he succeeded his uncle to the Lanhydrock estate in Cornwall. He modernised Lanhydrock House by demolishing the east wing, painting the house red and improving the interior.

== Political career ==
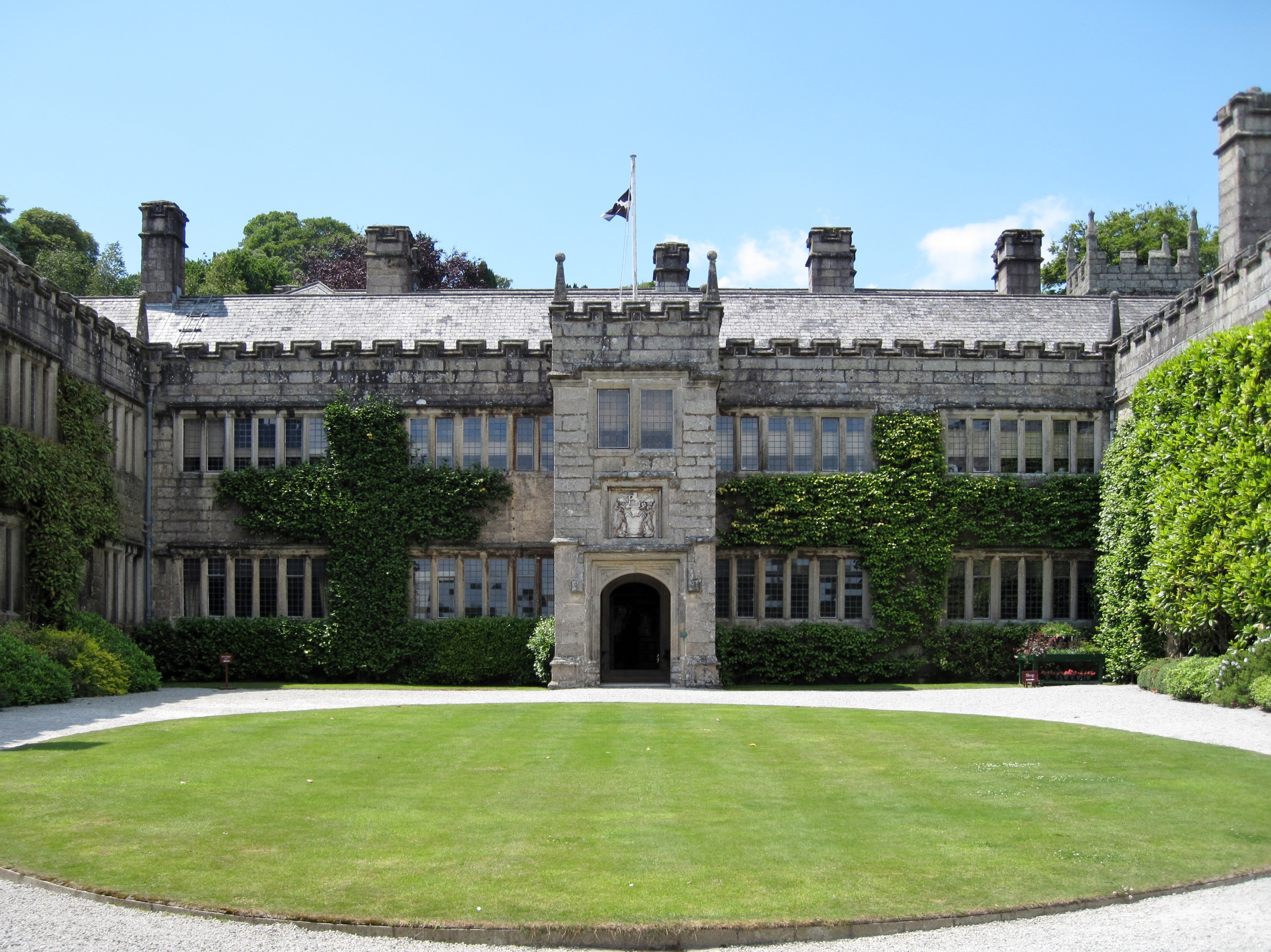
Lanhydrock House

Hunt was returned as a Member of Parliament for Bodmin at a by-election in 1753 and was then elected without a contest in the 1754 general election and the 1761 general election. There was a contest at Bodmin in the 1768 general election and Hunt topped the poll. Hunt was returned for Bodmin again in 1774 and 1780.

In 1780, the English Chronicle wrote "George Hunt, Esq. is a gentleman of independent fortune, and resides in the neighbourhood of this borough, in which he possesses sufficient influence to command an exclusive nomination for at least one Member. He has had the honour of representing it above thirty years, during which period he has never condescended to accept any favour, nor to become the creature of any Administration. He is attached to no set of political tenets in particular, but following the dictates of an independent and upright mind, has uniformly voted for or against such a system as he thought any way advantageous or inimical to the real interests of his country... He can neither be said to possess the shining qualities necessary for constituting a public orator, nor the systematic solidity requisite in a great statesman, but is nevertheless eminently qualified for the important trust he holds, viz. the honest representative of a free people".

Hunt did not stand at the 1784 general election but ceded his seat to his brother, Thomas Hunt. He is not recorded as making any speech during his 31 years in the House.

== Later life ==
Hunt died on 8 November 1798. On his death in 1798 the Lanhydrock estate passed to his niece Anna Maria Hunt.

Parliament of Great Britain
Preceded by Sir William Irby; John LaRoche	Member of Parliament for Bodmin; 1753–1784; With: Sir William Irby 1753–1761; John Parker 1761–1762; Sir Christopher Treise 1762–1768; James La Roche 1768–1780; William Masterman 1780–1784	Succeeded by Sir John Morshead; Thomas Hunt.
