= James La Roche =

English slave trader and politician

Laroche baronets
- Escutcheon of the Laroche baronets of Over
- Creation date: 1776
- Status: extinct
- Extinction date: 1804

Sir James La Roche, 1st Baronet (24 June 1734 – September 1804), or Laroche, was an English slave trader and politician. He was a younger son of John LaRoche, Member of Parliament.

== Life ==
La Roche became a Bristol slave trader, a partner with James Laroche the elder (died 1770), his uncle and a major figure there in the slave trade of the 1730s and 1740s, in James Laroche & Co. He was Sheriff of Bristol for 1764–5 and a master of the Society of Merchant Venturers in 1782–3.

La Roche represented Bodmin in Parliament between 1768 and 1780. He had financial troubles from the time of his first election, and he suffered bankruptcy in 1778.

In 1776 La Roche was created a baronet, of Over in the Parish of Aldmondbury in the County of Gloucester.

La Roche died in September 1804, aged 70, when the baronetcy became extinct.

== Property ==
James La Roche inherited estates in Cornwall, from John Robartes, 4th Earl of Radnor, an associate of his father, in 1757. He purchased the Elizabethan mansion Over Court near Almondsbury, Gloucestershire. He had there two enslaved Africans as servants.

In 1774 La Roche mortgaged an estate in Antigua that had passed to him from his wife. The mortgage was held by the merchant Justinian Casamajor (1746–1820).

== Family ==
La Roche married twice: firstly, in 1763 to Elizabeth, the daughter and heiress of John Yeamans of Antigua, widow of William Yeamans Archbould of Antigua and Bristol; she died in 1781. The couple had no children. He then remarried, and had one son, James.

Parliament of Great Britain
Preceded by George Hunt; Sir Christopher Treise	Member of Parliament for Bodmin; 1768–1780; With: George Hunt	Succeeded by George Hunt; William Masterman
Baronetage of Great Britain
New creation	Baronet (of Over); 1776–1804	Extinct
Preceded by Mackworth baronets	Laroche baronets of Over; 17 September 1776	Succeeded by Peyton baronets
