= John LaRoche (MP) =

British merchant and Whig politician

John LaRoche (c. 1700–1752) of Pall Mall, and Englefield Green, Surrey, was a British merchant and Whig politician who sat in the House of Commons from 1727 to 1752.

== Early life ==
LaRoche was the eldest son of Peter Crothaire (afterwards LaRoche), a Huguenot of Bordeaux, the barber of Queen Anne's husband Prince George of Denmark. He was admitted at the Middle Temple on 12 September 1717 and at Queens' College, Cambridge on 28 October 1717. He married before 1731, Elizabeth Garnier, the daughter of Isaac Garnier of St. James's, Westminster, apothecary to the army.

== Career ==
LaRoche worked initially as a steward for the Robartes family, who had a controlling interest in the Bodmin Parliamentary seat. He stood unsuccessfully for Parliament as Bodmin at a by-election in June 1725, but was returned as Whig Member of Parliament for Bodmin at another by-election on 31 January 1727. He was returned again shortly after at the 1727 British general election. He regularly voted with the Administration except against the Hessians in 1730. In 1732 he became one of the original trustees, as listed in the charter, for the newly formed colony of Georgia on the east coast of America. He was also an assistant at the Royal Africa Company from 1732 to 1746. He progressively built up a strong electoral interest of his own in the corporation of Bodmin. He was returned again for Bodmin at the 1734 British general election. One of his recorded speeches was made on 15 April 1736 in favour of a bill designed to check the alienation of lands to charities, while others were made on 4 February 1740 and 21 January 1741 in defence of the trustees of the board of Georgia. He was returned again in 1741 but was frequently absent through illness and did not vote on the chairman of the elections committee and on the Westminster election petition in December 1741. After the fall of Walpole in 1742, he supported successive Administrations. In 1745 he succeeded his father. He was returned again at the 1747 British general election.

== Death and legacy ==
LaRoche died on 20 April 1752 and was buried in Paddington Church, leaving three sons and four daughters. His younger son James was created baronet in 1776. His children were left Cornish estates by John Robartes, 4th Earl of Radnor.

== See also ==
- Trustees for the Establishment of the Colony of Georgia in America

Parliament of Great Britain
| Preceded by Isaac le Heup; Richard West | Member of Parliament for Bodmin; 1727–1752; With: Isaac le Heup 1727; Robert Booth 1727–33; Sir John Heathcote, Bt 1733–41; Thomas Bludworth 1741–47; Sir William Irby 1747–52 | Succeeded by Sir William Irby; George Hunt |
