= John Sargent (politician, born 1749) =

British politician

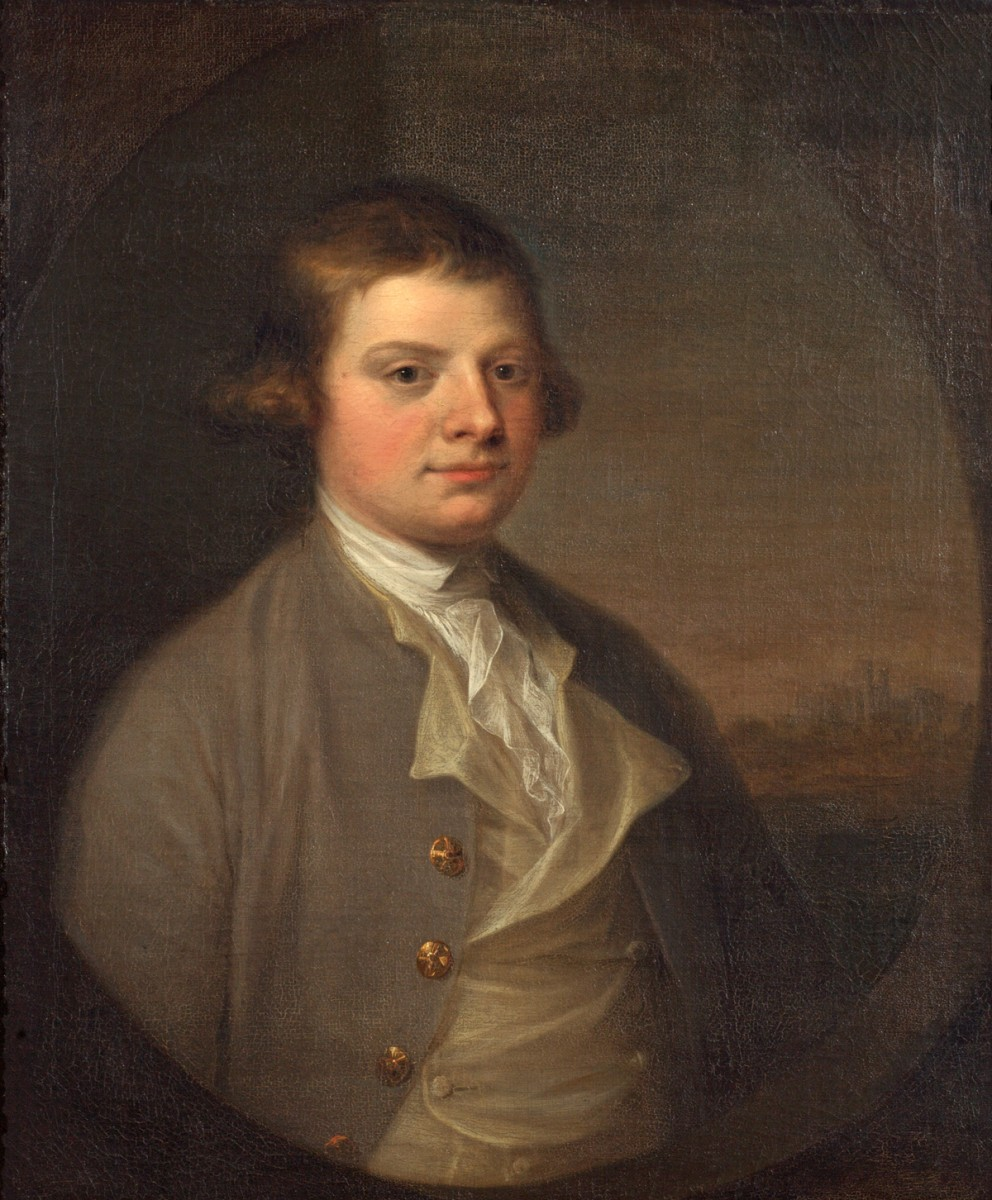
- Born: 1749
- Died: 9 September 1831 (aged 81–82)
- Education: Eton College, St. John’s College, Cambridge
- Spouse: Charlotte Bettesworth (m. 1778)

John Sargent (1749 – 9 September 1831) was a British Member of Parliament and administrator.

== Early life and education ==
He was born a younger son of John Sargent, MP of Halstead Place, Kent and educated at Eton College (1760–67) and St. John’s College, Cambridge (1767) before studying law at Lincoln's Inn from 1770.

== Career ==
He held a wide variety of offices: Director of the Bank of England (1778–79), Gentleman of the Privy Chamber (1784), member of the Board of Agriculture (1803), Clerk of the Ordnance (1793–1802), joint Secretary to the Treasury (1802–1804) and a Commissioner of Audit (1806–21).

He also served as Member of Parliament for Seaford from 1790 to 1793, for Queenborough from 1794 to 1802 and for Bodmin from 1802 to 1806.

== Personal life ==
On 21 December 1778, at Woolavington, Sussex, he married Charlotte, the daughter and heiress of Richard Bettesworth of Petworth, Sussex, with whom he had six sons and four daughters, including John Sargent, the clergyman and biographer. His second son, George Hanway Sargent was shot and killed in November 1807, aged 25, in the pursuit of the highwayman, Jim Allen.

Parliament of Great Britain
Preceded by Henry Flood; Sir Godfrey Webster	Member of Parliament for Seaford; 1790–1793; With: Richard Paul Jodrell 1790–1792; John Tarleton 1792–1793	Succeeded by John Tarleton; Richard Paul Jodrell
Preceded by Richard Hopkins; Augustus Rogers	Member of Parliament for Queenborough; 1794–1801; With: Richard Hopkins 1794–1796; Evan Nepean 1796–1801	Succeeded by Parliament of the United Kingdom
Parliament of the United Kingdom
Preceded by Parliament of Great Britain	Member of Parliament for Queenborough; 1801–1802; With: Evan Nepean	Succeeded by John Prinsep; George Peter Moore
Preceded by Sir John Morshead; Charles Shaw-Lefevre	Member of Parliament for Bodmin; 1802–1806; With: Josias Porcher	Succeeded by Josias Porcher; James Topping
Political offices
Preceded by Gibbs Craufurd	Clerk of the Ordnance; 1793–1802	Succeeded by William Wellesley-Pole
Preceded by Nicholas Vansittart	Junior Secretary to the Treasury; 1802–1804	Succeeded by William Sturges Bourne
