= Sarah Elizabeth Coryton =

High Sheriff of Cornwall

Sarah Elizabeth Coryton was a High Sheriff of Cornwall, UK. She lives in Saltash, in Pentillie Castle her renovation of which was featured on a Channel 4 program 'Country House Rescue'. She was sworn in as High Sheriff on 19 March 2017, succeeding Jane Hartley, becoming the 12th female high sheriff of Cornwall. She was succeeded by Paul Young-Jamieson.
