= Robert Worsley (MP for Callington) =

16th-century English politician

Sir Robert Worsley (died 1604/5), of Booths, Lancashire, was an English politician.

He was a member (MP) of the parliament of England for Callington in 1589.
