= Sir John Coryton, 4th Baronet =

British landowner and politician

Sir John Coryton, 4th Baronet (c. 1690 – 22 May 1739) was a British landowner and Tory politician who sat in the House of Commons between 1713 and 1734.

Coryton was born at Greenwich, the only son of Sir William Coryton, 3rd Baronet and his wife Susanna Littleton, daughter of Edward Littleton MP of Pillaton, Staffordshire. He was educated at Rugby School from 1698 and matriculated at Christ Church, Oxford on 14 October 1708, aged 18. He succeeded to the baronetcy on the death of his father on 6 December 1711. He married Rachel Helyar, daughter of William Helyar of East Coker, Somerset on 31 October 1715.

Coryton was returned as a Tory Member of Parliament for Callington in the general elections of 1713 and 1715. He did not stand in the 1722 general election, but was returned as MP for Callington again in 1727. He did not stand in 1734 as Walpole had bought him out of the seat.

Coryton died on 22 May 1739. He had no children and the baronetcy became extinct.

Parliament of Great Britain
| Preceded by Samuel Rolle; Henry Manaton | Member of Parliament for Callington; 1713 – 1722; With: Samuel Rolle 1713-1719; Thomas Coplestone 1719-1722 | Succeeded by Thomas Coplestone; Thomas Lutwyche |
| Preceded by Thomas Coplestone; Thomas Lutwyche | Member of Parliament for Callington; 1727 – 1734; With: Thomas Coplestone | Succeeded by Thomas Coplestone; Isaac le Heup |
Baronetage of England
| Preceded by William Coryton | Baronet (of Newton); 1711-1739 | Extinct |
