= Henry Golding (died 1593) =

16th-century English politician

Henry Golding (died 1593) was an English politician from Gray's Inn, London.

He was a Member of the Parliament of England for Callington in 1589.
