= Sir John Coryton, 2nd Baronet =

English Tory politician (1648–1690)

Arms of Coryton: Argent, a saltire sable

Sir John Coryton, 2nd Baronet (1648 – July 1690) was an English Tory politician.

== Biography ==
Coryton was the son of Sir John Coryton, 1st Baronet and Elizabeth Mills. He was educated at Exeter College, Oxford from 1666. On 22 February 1672, he married Elizabeth, daughter of Sir Richard Chiverton.

His first public office was as a commissioner for the assessment of tax in Cornwall from 1673. He contested a by-election for Newport in 1678, but was defeated by Ambrose Manaton. He was, however, returned as a member of parliament for the seat in the March 1679 English general election. He was absent from the first division on the Exclusion Bill, and stood down in favour of his brother at the October 1679 English general election. In August 1680, Coryton succeeded his father as a baronet and in 1681 he was appointed a justice of the peace for Cornwall. The following year he was appointed a justice of the peace for Devon. In 1683–4 he served a term as High Sheriff of Cornwall.

Coryton was elected to the Loyal Parliament to represent Callington, but he probably never took his seat in that parliament owing to illness. In 1686 he represented Foymore in the Cornish Stannary Parliament. He followed the lead of Sir John Carew, 3rd Baronet in returning negative answers to the three questions posed by James II's administration on the Test Acts 1673 & 1678 and Penal laws, and was removed from his local offices in July 1688. Following the Glorious Revolution later that year, Coryton voted in the Convention Parliament with the Lords who declared that the throne was not vacant after James II's departure. He was re-elected in the 1690 English general election and was recorded by Lord Carmarthen as a Tory, but died soon after and was buried in St Mellion on 30 July 1690. Coryton was succeeded by his younger brother, William Coryton.

Parliament of England
Preceded by Nicholas Morice; Ambrose Manaton	Member of Parliament for Newport with Ambrose Manaton; 1679	Succeeded by Sir William Coryton, Bt; Ambrose Manaton
Preceded by Richard Carew; Sir William Coryton, Bt	Member of Parliament for Callington with Sir William Coryton, Bt (1685–87); Jonathan Prideaux (1689); Francis Fulford (1690); 1685–1690	Succeeded by Jonathan Prideaux; Francis Fulford
Honorary titles
Preceded by Sir Vyell Vyvyan, Bt	High Sheriff of Cornwall; 1683–1684	Succeeded by Sir Richard Edgcumbe
Baronetage of England
Preceded by John Coryton	Baronet (of Newton); 1680–1690	Succeeded by William Coryton
