= Callington (constituency) =

Former parliamentary constituency in the United Kingdom

- Former borough constituency for the House of Commons

1585–1832
- Seats: Two
- Replaced by: East Cornwall

Callington was a rotten borough in Cornwall which returned two Members of Parliament to the House of Commons in the English and later British Parliament from 1585 to 1832, when it was abolished by the Reform Act 1832.

== History ==
The borough consisted of most of the town of Callington in the East of Cornwall. Callington was the last of the Cornish rotten boroughs to be enfranchised, returning its first members in 1585; like most of the Cornish boroughs enfranchised or re-enfranchised during the Tudor period, it was a rotten borough from the start, and was never substantial enough to have a mayor and corporation.

The right to vote in Callington was disputed until a decision of the House of Commons in 1821 settled it as resting with "freeholders of the borough and ... life-tenants of freeholders, resident for 40 days before the election and rated to the poor at 40 shillings or more". This considerably enlarged the electorate, for there had been only 42 voters in the borough in 1816, but the Parliamentary return of 1831 reported that 225 were qualified. In the 18th century the power of the "patron" to influence the voters in Callington was considered absolute. In 1831 the borough had a population of 1,082, and 225 houses; the part of the town outside the borough boundaries contained only a further eight houses, leaving no scope to enlarge it. It was disfranchised by the Great Reform Act in 1832.

== Patrons of pocket borough ==
The two patrons of the pocket borough of Callington were the Rolle family of Heanton Satchville, Petrockstowe, Devon (a junior branch of the Rolle family of Stevenstone and Bicton in Devon) and the Coryton family of the adjacent manor of St. Mellion, Cornwall.

=== Rolle patronage ===
In 1601 Robert Rolle (died 1633) of Heanton Satchville, Petrockstowe, Devon (a grandson of George Rolle (d.1552) of Stevenstone, founder of the Rolle family in Devon), purchased the manor of Callington in Cornwall, thereby gaining the pocket borough seat of Callington in Parliament, which in future served to promote the careers of many Rolles and descendants of that family. He nominated to this seat his first cousin once-removed John Rolle (born 1563) in 1601, his brother William Rolle (died 1652) in 1604 and 1614, his son Sir Henry Rolle (1589–1656), of Shapwick, in 1620 and 1624, his son Samuel's father-in-law Thomas Wise (died March 1641) of Sydenham in Devon, in 1625, and another son John Rolle (1598–1648), in 1626 and 1628. The manor and borough were later inherited by the Rolle heiress Margaret Rolle (1709-1765), suo jure 15th Baroness Clinton, wife of Robert Walpole, 2nd Earl of Orford whose son and heir George Walpole, 3rd Earl of Orford (d.1791) died without progeny. It then passed by inheritance to her cousin George William Trefusis, of Trefusis in Cornwall. Robert George William Trefusis (1764–1797) successfully claimed the title (17th) Baron Clinton in 1794. By 1816 it had passed to Robert Cotton St John Trefusis, 18th Baron Clinton but was no longer as secure as it had been, so that the Coryton family was sufficiently influential to challenge his power on occasion.

== Members of Parliament ==
=== 1585–1640 ===
Parliament	First member	Second member
Parliament of 1584–1585	Thomas Lawton	Thomas Harris
Parliament of 1586–1587	Edward Aylworth	William Herle
Parliament of 1588–1589	Robert Worsley	Henry Golding
Parliament of 1593	Robert Carey	Carew Reynell
Parliament of 1597–1598	Henry Ferrers	John Egerton
Parliament of 1601	Miles Raynesford	John Rolle
Parliament of 1604–1611	Sir Roger Wilbraham	Sir William Rolle
Addled Parliament (1614)	Humphrey Were	Sir William Rolle
Parliament of 1621–1622	Lord Wriothesley	Henry Rolle
Happy Parliament (1624–1625)	Sir Edward Seymour	Henry Rolle
Useless Parliament (1625)	Sir Richard Weston	Thomas Wise
Parliament of 1625–1626	Sir Clipseus Carew	John Rolle
Parliament of 1628–1629	Sir William Constable	John Rolle
No Parliament summoned 1629–1640

=== 1640–1832 ===
Year	First member	First party	Second member	Second party
April 1640	Sir Samuel Rolle	Parliamentarian	Thomas Gardiner	Royalist
November 1640	Sir Arthur Ingram	Parliamentarian	Hon. George Fane	Royalist
August 1642	Ingram died August 1642 - seat vacant		Hon. George Fane	Royalist
January 1643	Ingram died August 1642 - seat vacant		Fane disabled from sitting - seat vacant	
1646	Lord Clinton		Thomas Dacres	
December 1648	Clinton and Dacres excluded in Pride's Purge - both seats vacant			
1653	Callington was unrepresented in the Barebones Parliament and the First and Second Parliaments of the Protectorate			
January 1659	Thomas Carew		Anthony Buller	
May 1659	Not represented in the restored Rump			
April 1660	Robert Rolle		Edward Herle	
June 1660	Robert Rolle		John Coryton	
July 1660	Sir Hugh Pollard		John Coryton	
May 1661	Allen Brodrick		Sir Cyril Wyche	
June 1661	Sir Henry Bennet		Sir Cyril Wyche	
1665	Samuel Rolle		Sir Cyril Wyche	
February 1679	Samuel Rolle		John Coryton	
October 1679	Richard Carew		William Trevisa	
1681	Richard Carew		William Coryton	Tory
1685	Sir John Coryton	Tory	William Coryton	Tory
1689	Sir John Coryton	Tory	Jonathan Prideaux	
February 1690	Sir John Coryton	Tory	Francis Fulford	Tory
October 1690	Jonathan Prideaux		Francis Fulford	Tory
1695	Sir William Coryton	Tory	Francis Gwyn	Tory
1698	Sir William Coryton	Tory	Francis Fulford	Tory
January 1701	Sir William Coryton	Tory	Robert Rolle	Tory
December 1701	Samuel Rolle	Tory	Robert Rolle	Tory
1702	Samuel Rolle	Tory	John Acland	Tory
1703	Samuel Rolle	Tory	Sir William Coryton	Tory
1712	Samuel Rolle	Tory	Henry Manaton	Tory
1713	Samuel Rolle	Tory	Sir John Coryton	Tory
1719	Thomas Coplestone	Whig	Sir John Coryton	Tory
1722	Thomas Coplestone	Whig	Thomas Lutwyche	Tory
1727	Thomas Coplestone	Whig	Sir John Coryton	Tory
1734	Thomas Coplestone	Whig	Isaac le Heup	
1741	Thomas Coplestone	Whig	Hon. Horatio Walpole	Whig
1748	Edward Bacon		Hon. Horatio Walpole	Whig
1754	Hon. Sewallis Shirley		John Sharpe	
1756	Hon. Sewallis Shirley		Fane William Sharpe	
1761	Richard Stevens		Fane William Sharpe	
1768	Thomas Worsley		Fane William Sharpe	
1771	Thomas Worsley		William Skrine	
1774	John Dyke Acland		William Skrine	
1778	George Stratton		William Skrine	
1780	George Stratton		John Morshead	
1784	Sir John Call		Paul Orchard	
1801	John Inglett-Fortescue		Paul Orchard	
1803	Ambrose St John		Paul Orchard	
1806	William Wickham		William Garrow	Whig
1807	Lord Binning	Tory	Thomas Carter	
1810	Lord Binning	Tory	William Stephen Poyntz	Whig
1812	Sir John Leman Rogers		William Stephen Poyntz	Whig
1813	Hon. Charles Trefusis	Tory	William Stephen Poyntz	Whig
1818	Hon. Edward Pyndar Lygon	Tory	Sir Christopher Robinson	Tory
1820	Matthias Attwood	Whig	William Thompson	Whig
1826	Matthias Attwood	Whig	Alexander Baring	Whig
1830	Bingham Baring	Whig	Alexander Baring	Whig
1831	Henry Bingham Baring	Tory	Hon. Edward Herbert	Tory
1832	Constituency abolished			
