= Coryton baronets =

Extinct baronetcy in the Baronetage of England

Arms of Coryton: Argent, a saltire sable

The Coryton Baronetcy, of Newton (West Newton Ferrers, St Mellion) in the County of Cornwall, was a title in the Baronetage of England. It was created on 27 February 1662 for John Coryton, Member of Parliament for Callington, Cornwall and Launceston. He was the son of Sir William Coryton. The second Baronet represented Newport and Callington in Parliament. The third Baronet was member of parliament for Bossiney, Newport, Callington and Mitchell. The fourth Baronet represented Callington in Parliament. The title became extinct on his death in 1739.

== Coryton baronets, of Newton (1662) ==
- Sir John Coryton, 1st Baronet (1621–1680)
- Sir John Coryton, 2nd Baronet (1648–1690)
- Sir William Coryton, 3rd Baronet (1650–1711)
- Sir John Coryton, 4th Baronet (1690–1739)
