= Samuel Rolle (1646–1719) =

English Tory politician

Samuel Rolle (1646 – 1719) was an English Tory politician who sat as a Member of Parliament for Callington and Devon.

== Early life and education ==
Rolle was baptized on 5 November 1646, he was the only surviving son of Robert Rolle and Lady Arabella Clinton, a daughter of Theophilus Clinton, 4th Earl of Lincoln. Rolle's father died in 1660 and in 1662 Rolle was sent abroad to France and Switzerland with a Presbyterian tutor for his education. He married Frances, the daughter of John Roy on 7 February 1671 and married Margaret, the daughter of Roger Tuckfield on 26 October 1704, they had two sons (who predeceased him) and two daughters.

== Parliamentary career ==
In 1665, Rolle entered Parliament after a by-election in Callington when Henry Bennet, 1st Earl of Arlington was elevated to the Lords. During the Cavalier Parliament, he was mostly inactive, being summoned as a defaulter in 1668 and 1671.

Rolle was re-elected to Callington in March 1679; Devon in 1681, 1689, 1690, 1695, 1698, February 1701; Callington in November 1701, 1702, 1705, 1708, 1710, 1713 and 1715 – November 1719. He also contested Penryn unsuccessfully. Initially identified with the Whig faction owing to his strong support for exclusion, he later became strongly identified with Tory politics. After the Glorious Revolution of 1688, he was identified dismissively as a "false player" by the new Williamite regime. He was a member of the October Club from 1711 to 1714 and was reputed to be a "furious Jacobite". He was an opponent of his Whig neighbour, John Harris, who he called "the Hanover rat".

Rolle held numerous local offices during his career, including as a commissioner for assessment in Devon from 1667 and Cornwall from 1673, a justice of the peace and deputy lieutenant of both Devon and Cornwall, a colonel of the Devon militia, and a commissioner for recusants in Devon and Cornwall.

Rolle died in 1719 and was buried on 5 November 1719 at Petrockstowe.
