= Sir William Coryton, 3rd Baronet =

English politician and barrister (1650–1711)

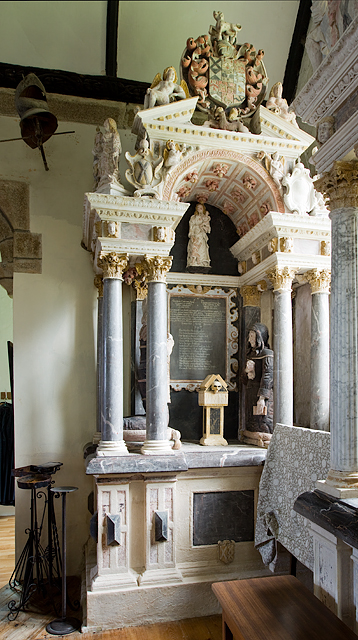
Monument to Sir William Coryton in Saint Mellanus Church in Mullion

Sir William Coryton, 3rd Baronet (bapt. 24 May 1650 – 6 December 1711) was an English Tory politician and barrister who sat in the House of Commons of England from 1679 and in the House of Commons of Great Britain until his death in 1711. His career in parliament spanned the reigns of Charles II, James II, William III, and Queen Anne.

Coryton was the second son of John Coryton, of West Newton Ferrers, St Mellion, Cornwall, and his first wife, Elizabeth Mills. In 1661, his father was created a baronet.

He was educated in Exeter and at Oxford University. He joined the Middle Temple in 1669 and was called to the bar in 1675.

Arms of Coryton: Argent, a saltire sable

In 1688, he married Susanna Littleton, daughter of Sir Edward Littleton, 2nd Baronet. They had a son, John, and daughter, Susanna. He inherited the baronetcy from his elder brother, John, who died without an heir in July 1690. After her death in 1695, he married Sarah Williams, widow of Thomas Williams.

Between 1685 and 1695, Coryton built Newton Ferrers House, a country house in St Mellion. It is a Grade I-listed building with English Heritage.

Baronetage of England
Preceded by John Coryton	Baronet (of Newton); 1690–1711	Succeeded by John Coryton
