= Church of King Charles the Martyr, Falmouth =

Church in Cornwall, England

Falmouth Parish Church of King Charles the Martyr
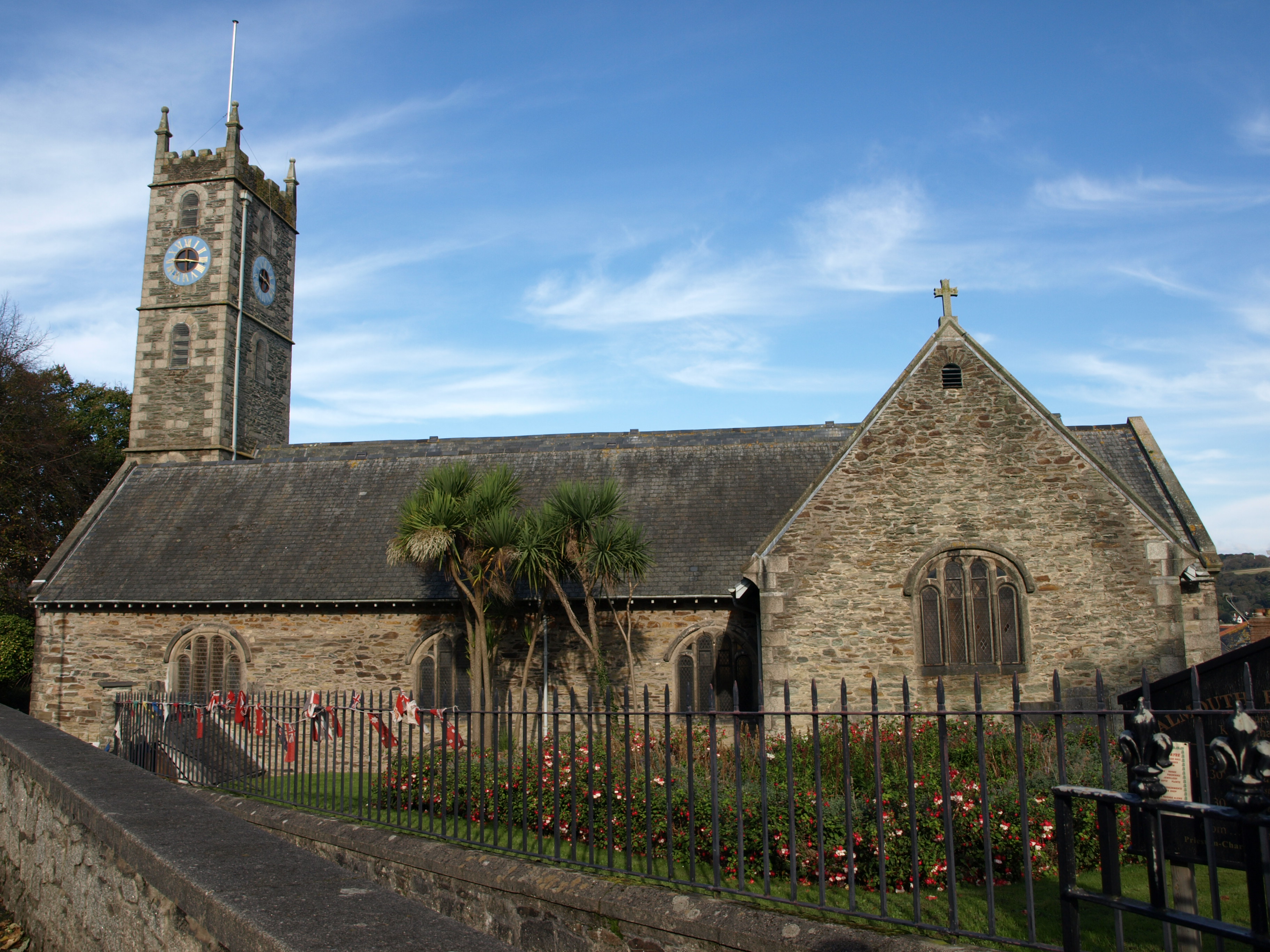
- King Charles Church, Falmouth
- Falmouth Parish Church of King Charles the Martyr
- 50°09′11.02″N 05°04′03.94″W
- Country: England
- Denomination: Church of England
- Churchmanship: Broad Church
- Website: kcm.aspier.co.uk/wordpress

History
- Dedication: King Charles the Martyr

Administration
- Province: Canterbury
- Diocese: Truro
- Archdeaconry: Cornwall
- Parish: Falmouth, Cornwall

Clergy
- Rector: Revd Stephen Tudgey

Listed Building – Grade II*
- Official name: Church of King Charles the Martyr
- Designated: 22 July 1949
- Reference no.: 1270080

The Church of King Charles the Martyr is a parish church in the Church of England situated in the centre of Falmouth, Cornwall.

== History ==
=== Founding ===
The foundations of the church were laid by Sir Peter Killigrew on 29 August 1662. Some 18 months later, on 21 February 1664, John Bedford, the Rector of Gerrans in the Roseland, preached the first sermon at the church and on 22 August 1665 it was consecrated. John Bedford's son, Francis Bedford was then appointed the first rector by Seth Ward, Bishop of Exeter.

The Church was dedicated to King Charles the Martyr, a title of King Charles I commemorating his execution on 30 January 1649 after the English Civil War. At the end of the war his heir, later Charles II, fled into exile via Pendennis Castle, a mile or so from where the church now stands, and planned to build "a chapel for public worship ... and when the wars ceased, to send an able and conscientious chaplain to preach God's word therein". Following the Restoration of the Monarchy however, it was Sir Peter Killigrew, of the nearby Arwenack Manor, who, having a long-standing ambition to found a town and a church on the Haven, sent an emissary to the King in London in 1660, seeking the grant of a Charter for the new town of Falmouth. He also offered land for a church, parsonage and churchyard if the King would sponsor the project. Owing partly, perhaps, to his diplomatic dedication of his new church to the King's martyred father, Sir Peter succeeded in modifying the royal vow and "received much help... through the generosity of Charles II and the Duke of York, and the liberal contributions of diverse honourable and worthy persons". The new parish of Falmouth was previously part of Budock parish; the rectory (benefice) was endowed by Sir Peter with a rate on every house in the new parish. However the members of various Nonconformist sects were very unwilling to pay the rate and they were a large part of the population in the late 17th century; later rectors were "glad to make arrangements for its final extinction".

=== Later history ===
The church has undergone many alterations since its consecration. Originally, the building is thought to have been some 66 feet square. In 1684 the first extensions to the church were carried out by Walter Quarme, the third rector. A chancel was built at the east end and the lowest part of the tower was built. In 1686, a gallery was built at the west end, at the cost of Sir Peter Killigrew. The gallery over the north aisle was added in 1699, and in 1702 the gallery over the south aisle was built. Also in 1702, the first organ, built by John Russell of London, was installed at the west end. In 1738, the tower was raised and acquired a 12-hundredweight bell (now, after various changes, replaced by an eight bell carillon).

By 1813, the population of Falmouth had grown to over 7,000, so the 1684 chancel was demolished, the church lengthened to the east by nearly a third, and the chancel was then rebuilt. The fabric of the church slowly deteriorated during the early 19th century, and in 1896 another major reconstruction began. The three pitched roofs and the galleries were removed and the walls were raised to allow three new barred ceilings with ornamental plaster-work to be installed. The work took about a year to complete. Subsequent improvements included a new organ chamber in 1915; the area previously occupied by the organ became the Warrior Chapel. Electric lighting was introduced in 1907 and in 1936 the baptistery was formed, although the font dates from 1759.

It has been remarked by one historian that Falmouth Parish Church has probably undergone more alterations and additions than any other church in the United Kingdom. Charles Henderson observed in 1925: "It is interesting for its curious mixture of the Gothic and Classical styles. Its worst feature is a weak west tower in the former manner. A Wren steeple would have been far more suitable to the situation."

==== William John Coope ====
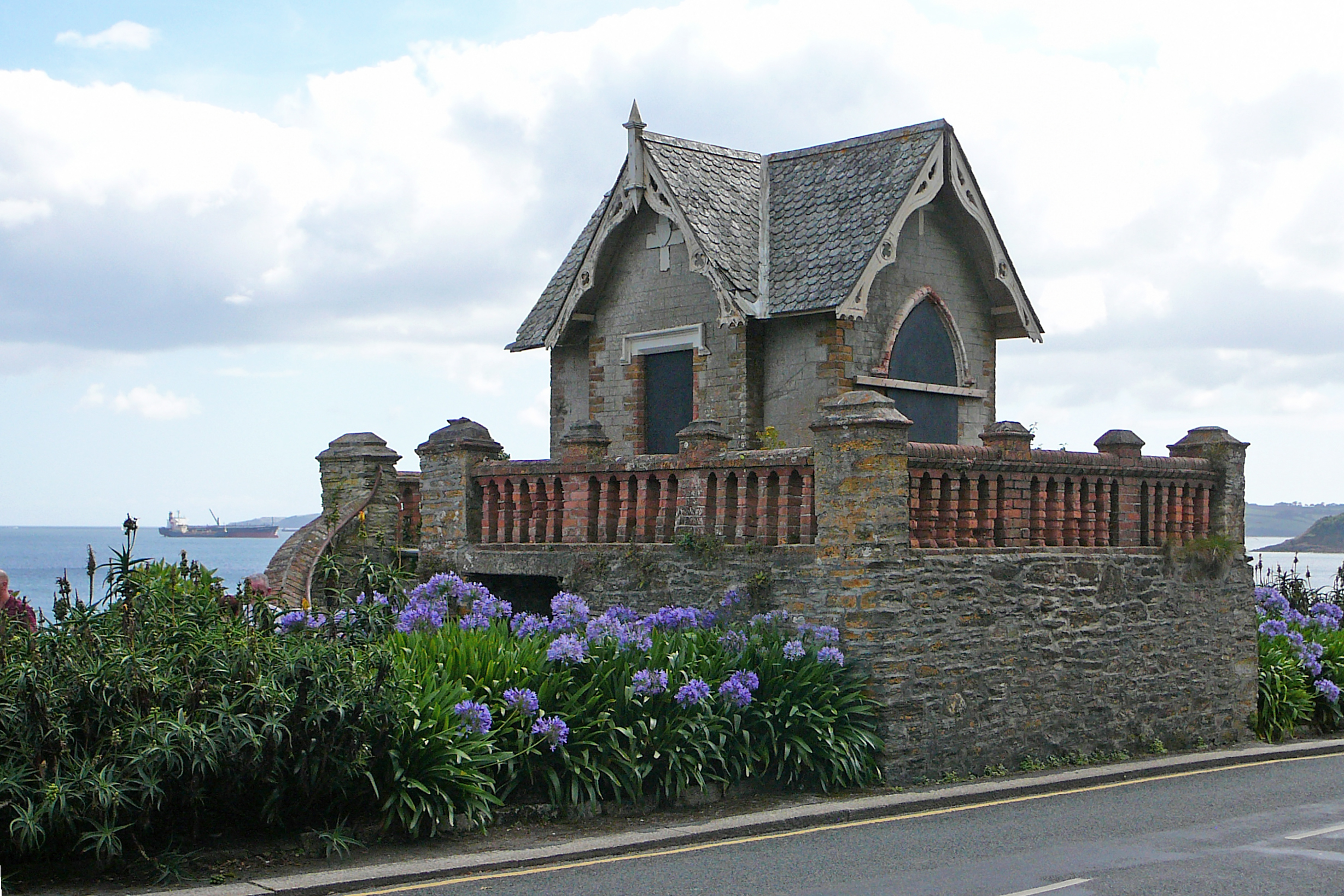
The chapel of Gyllyngdune House, built by William Coope

The Rev. William John Coope (born c. 1810) was rector from 1838 to 1869. He was the pioneer of Tractarianism in Cornwall. While studying at Oxford Coope had been greatly influenced by the Oxford Movement. When he came to Falmouth the church was in a poor state of repair. Coope introduced changes in ritual in accordance with Tractarian ideas and aroused some opposition from a section of the parishioners. This opposition had abated by 1847; in 1849 a letter appeared in the West Briton complaining about the conduct of services at Falmouth. Coope was the author of many publications which emphasised the Catholicity of the Church of England. The church was much improved during his time: there were new vestries, a north porch, stained east window and a new reredos and pulpit. Opposition to Coope's practices led eventually to a dispute with the Archdeacon, W. J. Phillpotts, in 1866. Coope was supported by the newly formed English Church Union and the Archdeacon who had planned legal action did not proceed.

=== List of rectors ===
- Francis Bedford 1664–76
- John Quarme 1676–79
- Walter Quarme 1679–1728
- John Millington 1728–35
- Edward Walmsley 1735–95
- John Watkin Wilbraham 1795–1824
- Lewis Mathias 1824–28
- Hon. William Wodehouse 1828–38
- William John Coope 1838–70
- Joseph Baley 1870–72
- John Wright 1872–82
- Brian Christopherson 1882–1912
- Henry Hugh King 1912–18
- Montague Blamire Williamson 1918–1924 (later Archdeacon of Bodmin)
- Bertram Liddell Hope 1924–36
- Osmund Ralph Maude Roxby 1936–46
- Joseph Percy Hodges 1946–55
- Thomas Barfett 1955–77 (later Archdeacon of Hereford)
- William John Peter Boyd 1977–85
- Roger Geoffrey Gilbert 1986–2002
- Stephen John Tudgey 2003–Present

== Music ==
For many years the church had an all-male choir which was disbanded in the late 1960s due to chorister recruitment difficulties. The choir now consists of adult SATB who sing two services each Sunday. There is also a Lunchtime Concert Series on Saturdays between May and October which was launched by the Director of Music, Lance Foy, in 2012.

=== The organ ===
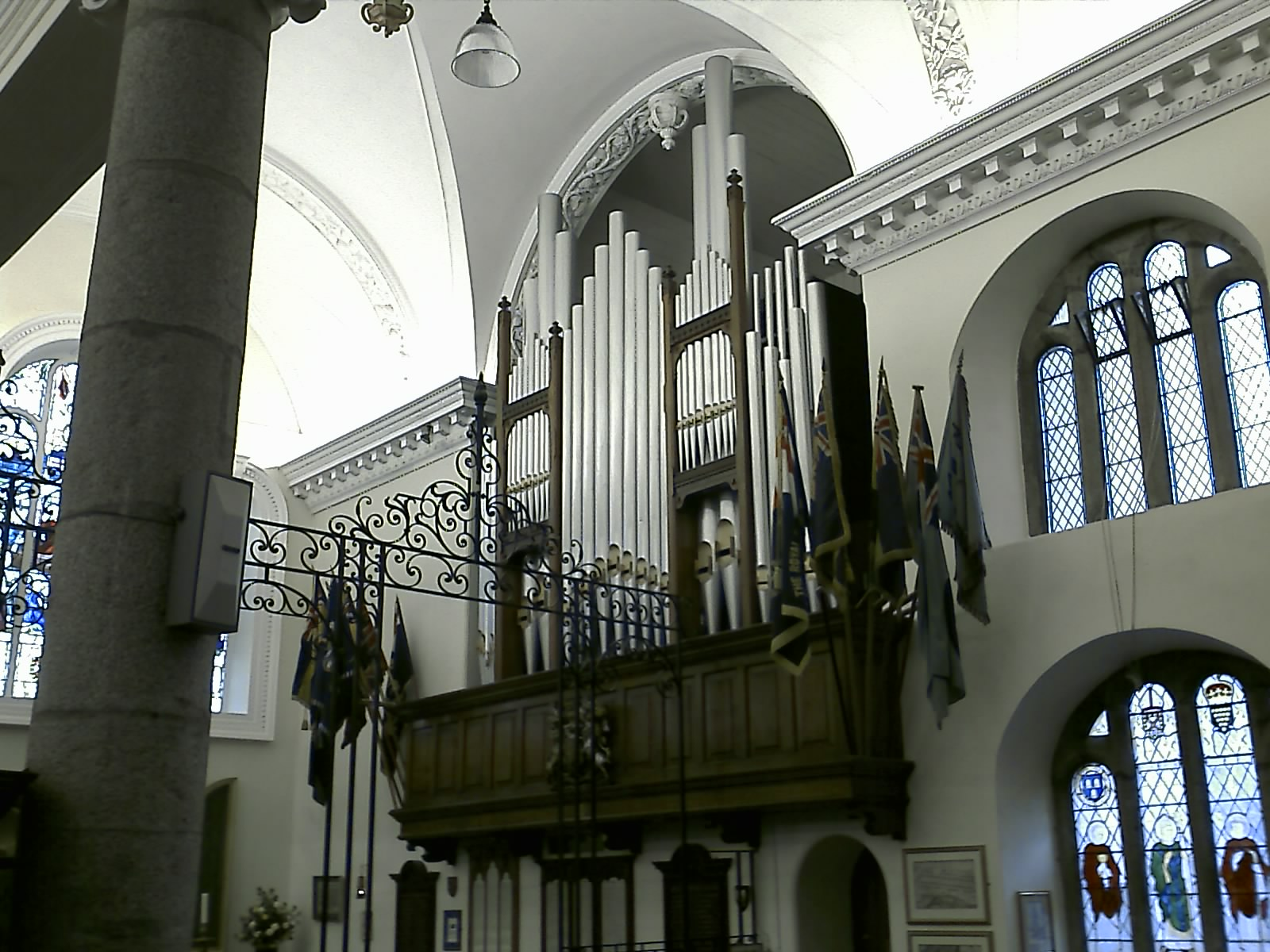
The Organ

The church has a three manual organ built by Lance Foy of Truro. It is the largest organ in Cornwall after the Father Willis organ at Truro Cathedral.

The first pipe organ was installed in the west gallery of the church in the spring of 1703 and was built by John Russell, a London-based organ builder, costing £200. It was not met with universal acclamation. One local lampoonist versified: "Arrived at the church, 'tis diverting to see Them all strut to Ned Kendall's [the organist's] vile twiddle dum dee, whose bass and whose treble, comparatively speaking, are like old pigs grunting and little pigs squeaking."

After 95 years service with little maintenance, the organ was dismantled and sold and a contract for a new instrument was placed with London organ builder Hugh Russell in 1798. The new organ had fifteen stops and a swell manual enclosed in a box with 'Nag Head' shutters (a recent innovation of the time) and also a short compassed pedal department.

In 1881, the second organ was in a bad state of repair and was sold and replaced by a three manual pipe organ built by Hele and Co. of Plymouth. This was situated in the Warrior Chapel (the south east corner of the church). The organ was played at floor level with the console directly behind the choir stalls. In 1910, £120 was spent on some tonal alterations made by Hele & Co; a Posaune reed stop (a typical Edwardian measure) and Small Open Diapason were added and the two original mixtures were removed from the Great and the Swell. In 1914, work on more tonal adjustments began - a Vox Humana rank was added, part of the organ was converted to Tubular Pneumatic action, a Tremulant stop to the Choir manual, and a new organ chamber was built and the organ moved from the Warrior Chapel to its present position. This work costed a total of £204 and was completed by Christmas 1915. The Organ had 30 speaking stops and a total of 1,886 pipes. In 1949 the instrument was cleaned and overhauled and the present 'Discus' blower installed in the fifties.

By the 1970s the organ had deteriorated to such an extent that it was becoming unplayable and in January 1978, Lance Foy of Truro started work on a new instrument. In 1979 a new organ was installed using parts of the organ from the redundant church of St. Thomas, Bristol, and much of the Hele pipework from the previous organ. In 1993, the organ was rebuilt again by Lance Foy, with various tonal improvements including the provision of a 16’ 8’ and 4’ Ophicleide and Trumpet unit, new upper work to the Great and Choir organs, the addition of a 4’ Flute, Oboe 8’ and Vox Humana 8’, a refurbished console and a new piston capture system.

A specification of the current organ can be found on the National Pipe Organ Register.

=== List of organists ===
- William West 1703–29
- Charles West 1729–60
- Edward Kendall 1760–1808
- Anthony Williams 1808–10
- Mathias Cisteraansz 1810–12
- Miss Jane Petherick 1812–15
- Mr. Parnell 1815–24
- Mr. Sharp 1824–30
- George James Webb 1830–42 (later organist of Old South Church)
- Professor Joseph Hale Coggins 1842–62
- Charles William Reed 1864–78
- William Treweeke 1878–80
- Professor C. W. Robinson 1880–95
- Robert E. Clark 1895–1911 (formerly organist of Winkfield Parish Church, Windsor)
- Ewart West 1911–24 (previously organist of Moreton-in-Marsh).
- E. Arthur West 1924–27
- Richard Glendinning 1927
- Gordan Hall 1927–72
- Ernest Green 1972–74
- Edward Goldsmith 1974–91
- Peter Young 1991–2001
- John Charles Winter 2001–07 (formerly organist of Truro Cathedral)
- Christopher Uren 2007–10
- Lance Foy 2010–14
- Richard Bailey 2015–Present

== Notable burials ==
- James Cunningham, 14th Earl of Glencairn
