= Killigrew baronets =

Extinct baronetcy in the Baronetage of England

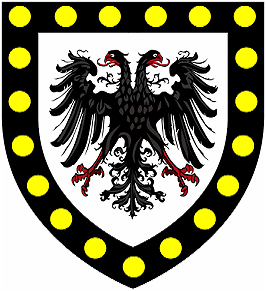
Arms of Killigrew: Argent, an eagle displayed with two heads sable a bordure of the second bezantée. The bezantée bordure indicates a connection to the ancient Earls of Cornwall

The Killigrew Baronetcy, of Arwennick in the County of Cornwall, was a title in the Baronetage of England. It was created on 22 December 1660 for William Killigrew (d.1665), 6th son of John Killigrew (c.1557-1605) of Arwenack, near Falmouth in Cornwall, thrice MP for Penryn in 1584, 1586 and 1597, and Vice-Admiral of Cornwall and like his father and grandfather was Captain of Pendennis Castle (1584–98) The 1st Baronet was created a baronet at the Restoration of the Monarchy in 1660, which event was largely brought about by his uncle George Monck, 1st Duke of Albemarle (1608–1670). He died without progeny and the title by special remainder descended to his nephew Peter Killigrew, son of his elder brother Sir Peter Killigrew (1593–1667), MP for Camelford. The second Baronet was Member of Parliament for Camelford. The title became extinct on his death in 1704.

== Killigrew baronets, of Arwennick (1660) ==
- Sir William Killigrew, 1st Baronet (died 1665)
- Sir Peter Killigrew, 2nd Baronet (c. 1634–1705)
