= John Killigrew =

John Killigrew may refer to:

- Sir John Killigrew (died 1584), Governor of Pendennis Castle
- Sir John Killigrew (died 1605), MP for Penryn
