= Elizabeth Killigrew =

Elizabeth Killigrew may refer to:

- Elizabeth Trewinnard, Elizabeth Trewinnard, Lady Killigrew (before 1525 – after 1582)
- Elizabeth Killigrew, Viscountess Shannon, wife of Francis Boyle, 1st Viscount Shannon and mistress of Charles II of England
