= William Dodington =

William Dod(d)ington may refer to:

- William Dodington (MP for Penryn and Boston) (died 1600)
- William Doddington (1572–1638), MP for Lymington, son of the MP for Downton
- William Dodington (MP for Downton) (died 1624)
