= Mary Wolverston =

English pirate

Mary Wolverston, Lady Killigrew (formerly Knyvett; born before 1525 – died after 1587), was a gentlewoman from Suffolk, married into an ancient Cornish family, who was accused of piracy during the reign of Queen Elizabeth I (1558-1603).

Several sources have confused this lady with her husband Sir John IV Killigrew's mother, Elizabeth Trewennard/Trewinnard, and even with his granddaughter-in-law, Jane Fermor.

== Origins ==
She was the daughter of Philip Wolverston (often described as a "gentleman pirate") of Woolverstone Hall in Suffolk, and the widow of Henry Knyvett.

== Marriage ==
She was the wife of Sir John IV Killigrew of Arwenack (d. 1584), near Penryn in Cornwall, 2nd Governor of nearby Pendennis Castle, built on the family's estate.

He was MP for Lostwithiel in 1563 and twice for the family's pocket borough of Penryn, in 1571 and 1572.

== Piracy ==
In the 1540s, Pendennis Castle was built by King Henry VIII on part of the Arwenack estate belonging to the Killigrew family. Mary's father-in-law, John III Killigrew (d. 1567), was appointed by the king as the first hereditary Governor of Pendennis Castle, and after his death Queen Elizabeth I appointed, as second Governor, his son, Sir John IV Killigrew.

The Governorship allowed control to be exerted on all of the shipping in the Carrick Roads harbour (the third largest natural harbour in the world), and along part of the south coast. Sir John IV Killigrew used his privileged position to prey on the cargoes of the ships that came within his reach. In 1567, Arwenack House was fortified as a stronghold and used to store merchandise stolen in raids on ships. Mary and her husband paid large fees to officials, bribing them to allow their illicit activities. Mary played an active role in the piracy and apparently enjoyed the adventure more than her husband.

Historian Neville Williams described Mary (whom he erroneously called "Elizabeth") as a "tough and unprincipled businesswoman" who managed Arwenack House and oversaw the burial of treasure in her garden.

In January 1582, Mary, by that time in her 60s, heard a rumour that there was treasure aboard the Spanish ship Marie of San Sebastian anchored opposite Arwenack House, and she sent her servants to seize the ship and search the cargo. Despite rumours to the contrary, it seems unlikely she ever personally went on a raid; however, she was arrested for having received and fenced stolen goods after the seizure of Marie of San Sebastian, during which a factor was murdered when the ship was boarded by her raiding party.

Some of her family members were included in the accusation. Mary was brought to trial and sentenced to death. Though two of her assistants were executed, she eventually received a pardon from Queen Elizabeth I. Mary's son secured her release from prison after having paid substantial bribes.

== Death ==
Mary Wolverston, Lady Killigrew, died on an unknown date in the parish of St Budock, Cornwall, in which was situated Arwenack. She was still alive in 1587 when her son John was accused of hindering further legal proceedings for piracy against her. A memorial at St Budock church features a figurine of her.

== In fiction ==
The identity of Mary Killigrew is often confused with that of her mother-in-law, Elizabeth Trewinnard, in derivative sources and fictional works.

Lady Killigrew is arguably the dominant character in the historical novel The Grove of Eagles (which is the meaning of the Cornish word Killigrew, the original estate of the family) by Winston Graham. Her grandson, who narrates the novel, describes her as a woman of insatiable greed and desire for power: "she knew all she wanted and wanted all she knew". Another character condemns her as "that harsh and evil woman".

Her husband appears in Rafael Sabatini's The Sea-Hawk as well as in a series of German sea adventures "Seewölfe, Korsaren der Weltmeere". He is usually depicted as a villain.

== Progeny ==
By her husband Mary had the following progeny:

- John V Killigrew (c.1557-1605), Esquire, of Arwennack, eldest son and heir, MP, 3rd Governor of Pendennis Castle. who married Dorothy Monck, daughter of Thomas Monck and Elizabeth Powel. Thomas Monk of Potheridge ancestor of General George Monck, 1st Duke of Albemarle (1608-1670), by whom he had issue.
- Thomas Killigrew, 2nd son, died without progeny.
- Simon Killigrew, 3rd son.
- Mary Killigrew, eldest daughter.
- Katherine Killigrew (d.1598) 3rd wife of Sir Henry Billingsley (c. 1538-1606) Lord Mayor of London.

== Correct sources ==
Several sources have confused this woman with Sir John IV Killigrew's mother, Elizabeth Trewennard/Trewinnard, and even with his granddaughter-in-law Jane Fermor. The primary source for this famous story, which has been much added to and embroidered by several writers, is:

- Calendar of State Papers, Domestic, 15 January 1582 & 2 March 1582, which is a record of the official enquiry.

The most reliable secondary source is:

- Michell Whitley, H. , Journal of the Royal Institution of Cornwall, Vol.VII, 1881-3, pp. 282–7, Dame Killigrew and the Spanish Ship, re account of piracy of Mary Wolverston, wife of Sir John IV Killigrew (d.1584). This is the most reliable account and lists inaccuracies of Hals's account. Followed by Baring-Gould.

Details of inaccurate sources are set out in:

- Baring Gould, Sabine, Cornish Characters and Strange Events, London, 1909, Dame Killigrew

The most reliable pedigree of the Killigrew family is:

- Vivian, Lt.Col. J. L., (ed.) The Visitations of Cornwall: Comprising the Heralds' Visitations of 1530, 1573 & 1620; with additions by J. L. Vivian, Exeter, 1887, pedigree of Killigrew, pp. 267–271

== Sources with erroneous names ==
- Hals, William (1655–1737), Compleat History of Cornwall (erroneous identification as Jane Fermor).
- Kathy Lynn Emerson, A Who's Who of Tudor Women (erroneous identification as Elizabeth Trewinnard)
