= John Killigrew (died 1584) =

English politician and pirate

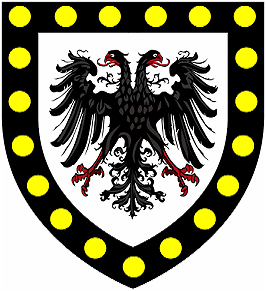
Arms of Killigrew: Argent, an eagle displayed with two heads sable a bordure of the second bezantée. The bezantée bordure indicates a connection to the ancient Earls of Cornwall

Sir John Killigrew (died 5 March 1584) of Arwenack, near Penryn, Cornwall, was the second Governor of Pendennis Castle (1568–1584), appointed by Queen Elizabeth I, as stated on his father's brass in St Budock's Church. He was MP for Lostwithiel in 1563 and twice for the family's pocket borough of Penryn, in 1571 and 1572.

His appointment as a commissioner to enquire into piracy notwithstanding, he was himself a notorious pirate and smuggler. It was said of his son John Killigrew (1547–1605), by an opposing litigant, that "He kept not within the compass of the law, as his father now and then, from fear of punishment, did."

== Origins ==
=== Killigrew family background ===
The Killigrew family, influential in Cornish life for several centuries, arose in the parish of St Erme, some five miles north of Truro. There, the placename "Killigrew" signifies "a grove of eagles". Ralph de Killigrew was reputedly a natural son of Richard, Duke of Cornwall by Joan de Vautort, a tradition supposedly exemplified by the spread eagle and bordure bezanté of the Killigrew arms.

In the late 14th century Ralph's descendant Simon Killigrew acquired the manor of Arwenack (near the old custom house of the town of Falmouth, neither of which then existed), and other extensive lands, by marriage to Jane, daughter and heir of Robert, lord of that manor. The Killigrews thereby gained control over the west side of the Penryn haven, including the land of the Pendennis promontory and the coastlands as far south as the Helford River.

=== Arwenack and Penryn ===
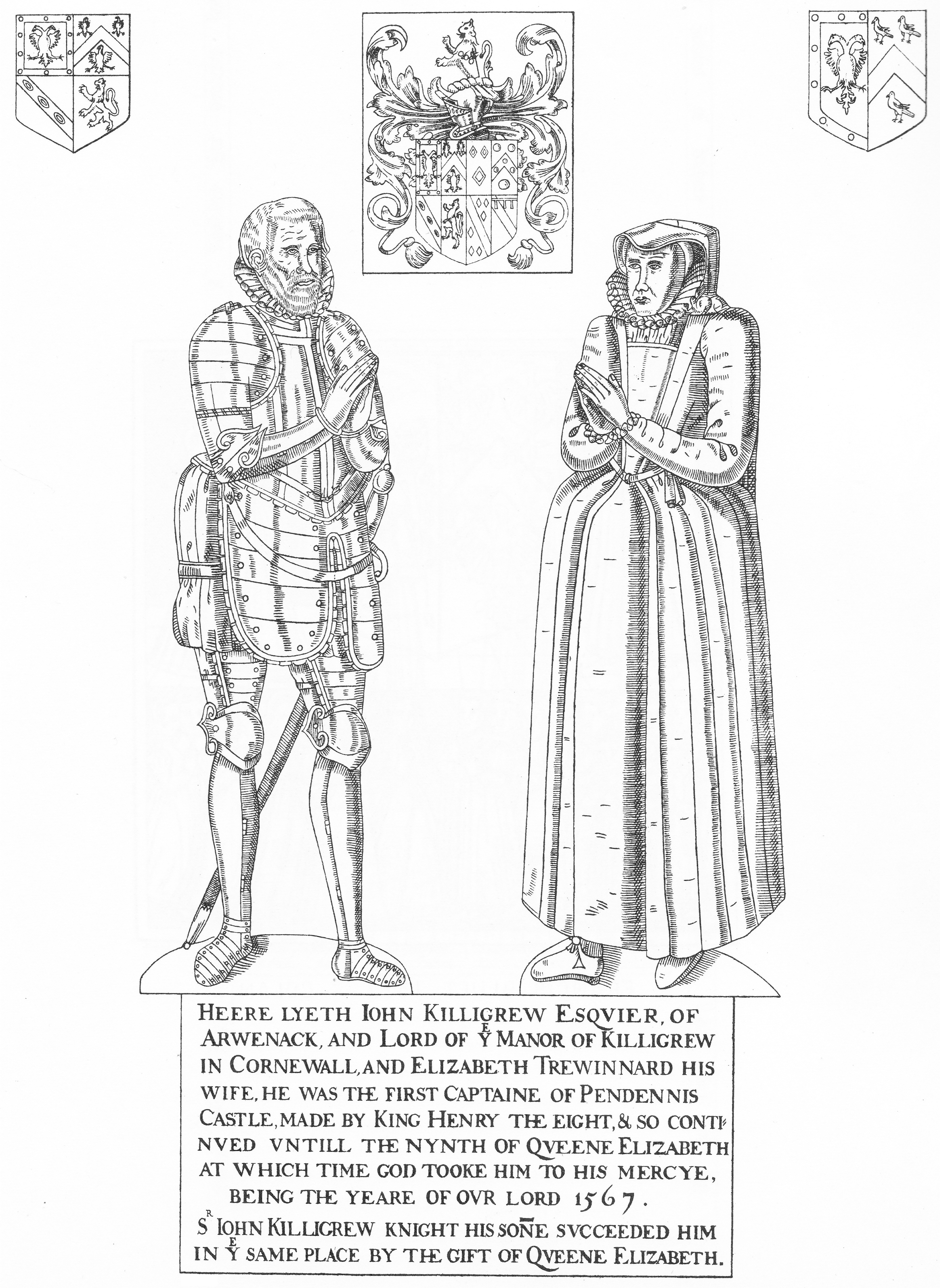
John Killigrew (died 1567) and Elizabeth Trewennard, parents of Sir John, monumental brass at St Budock.

Simon's son and heir Thomas Killigrew of Arwenack had two sons both named John, the elder of whom was seated at Arwenack and the younger (who died in 1461) at Penryn. Each had a son named Thomas. Thomas of Penryn (born c. 1445), of the junior line, died testate in 1501 leaving a daughter and three sons, the eldest of whom (the heir) was John Killigrew (died 1536). His younger brother Robert died in 1531. This John, on the failure of the elder line of his cousin Thomas of Arwenack (who died in Aragon in 1513), became master both of Penryn and of Arwenack.

=== Sir John's parentage ===
John married Jane Petit, widow of Thomas Trevanion, and had a daughter and four sons. His heir, John Killigrew of Arwenack (died 1567), married Elizabeth Trewennard, second daughter of James Trewennard of Trewennard, in the parish of St Erth, Cornwall. They are commemorated by a monumental brass at St Budock, which shows him in full armour, and describes him as the first Captain of Pendennis Castle, to which he was appointed by King Henry VIII. His brothers Bennet Killigrew (died 1544) and James Killigrew (died 1567), and his sister Elizabeth who married Thomas Treffry of Fowey in 1505, all have a significant part in the story of the Tudor Killigrews.

=== Brothers and sisters ===
The memorial to John Killigrew and Elizabeth Trewennard was placed by their son Sir John Killigrew (died 1584), the subject of the present article. Sir John was the eldest of five sons, of whom the next eldest, Peter and Thomas, are best known for their piratical and sea-roving exploits, in opposition to Queen Mary and in support of English exiles abroad. The younger brothers had more respectable careers, most notably (Sir) Henry Killigrew (born c.1527), a Marian exile and distinguished Elizabethan diplomat and M.P., and (Sir) William Killigrew, M.P. They had five sisters: Margaret Killigrew was contracted to marry Sir Francis Godolphin (c.1534-1606) in 1552.

== Career ==
His brothers, particularly Peter and Thomas Killigrew, had been engaged in piracy off the Irish coast during Edward's reign. Together with his father, John opposed the Catholic Queen Mary I (1553–1558) and her husband, Philip II of Spain, and used his fleet of ships to keep the Protestant exiles in France abreast of political developments and to attack Spanish shipping in the Channel. In 1556, he was imprisoned by Mary with his father in the Fleet, but released after three weeks. Peter Killigrew maintained his activities in opposition to Mary's reign, while his brother Henry Killigrew remained an exile abroad.

Upon the succession of the Protestant Queen Elizabeth I (1558–1603), John was restored to royal favour. He was knighted on 25 December 1576.

He became notorious for engaging in cattle theft, "evil usage in keeping of a castle" (presumably Pendennis) and as a Justice of the peace for abuses in arranging the quarter sessions. Having been appointed a Commissioner to inquire into piracy, he himself was heavily engaged in that activity and traded with smugglers and pirates who frequented the waters around Arwenack. He was the subject of an official investigation in 1565.

In January 1582, both he and his wife, Mary Wolverston, were suspected of involvement in a notorious act of piracy concerning a Spanish ship which had sheltered from a storm in an anchorage opposite Arwenack. It was said that he and his wife had acted together to overpower or murder the crew and steal the cargo of cloth, before ordering the ship to be disposed of in Ireland.

== Marriage and children ==
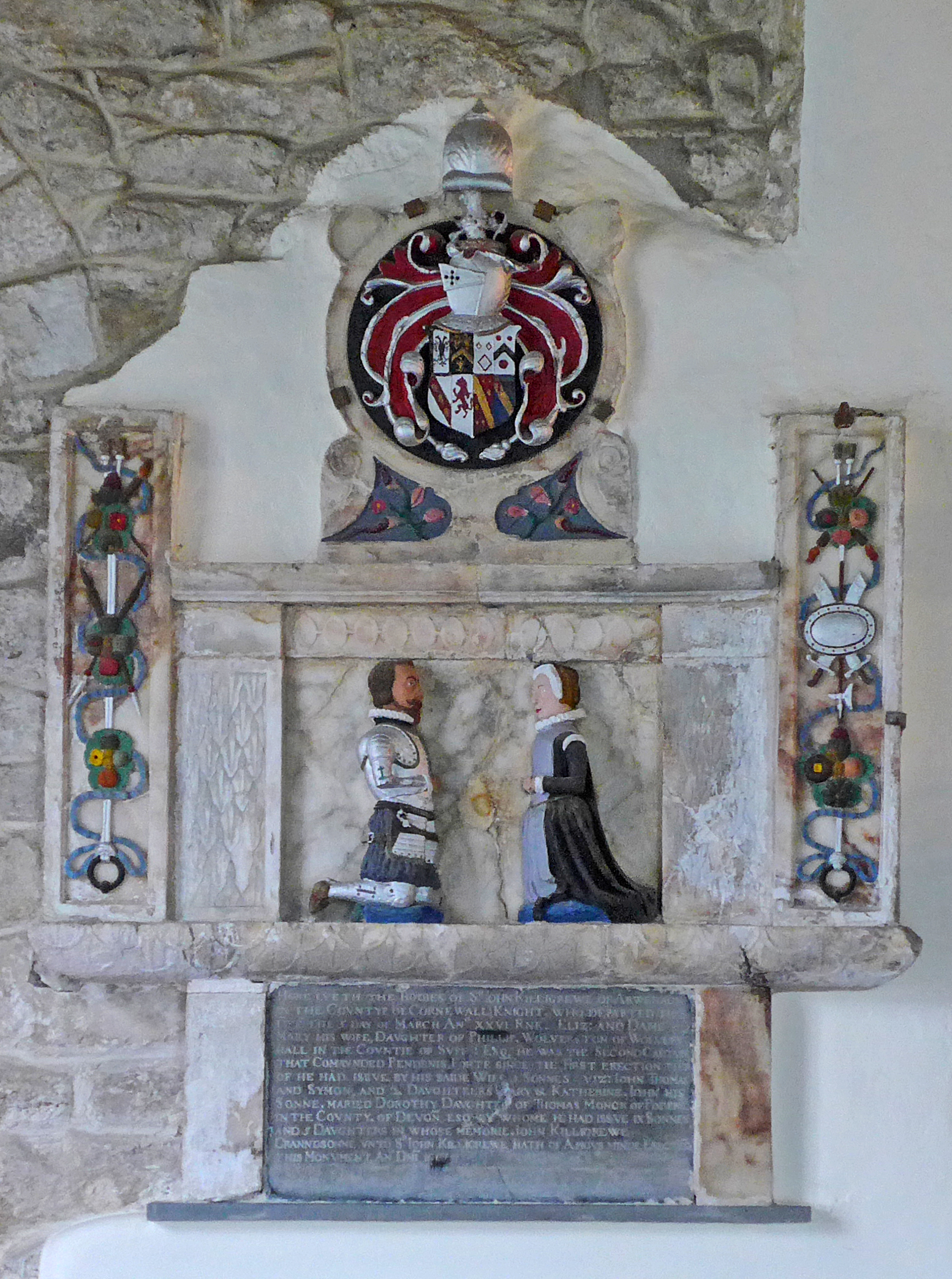
Monument to Sir John and Dame Mary Killigrew at St Budock. Image: Tim Green.

He married Mary Wolverston, a daughter of Philip Wolverston of Wolverston Hall in Suffolk, and widow of Henry Knyvett. Their children included:

- John Killigrew V (c. 1557 – 1605), of Arwenack, eldest son and heir, three times MP for Penryn in 1584, 1586 and 1597, and Vice-Admiral of Cornwall and like his father and grandfather Captain of Pendennis Castle (1584–98).
- Simon Killigrew
- Thomas Killigrew
- Mary Killigrew, who died unmarried
- Katherine Killigrew (died 1598), youngest daughter, who was the third wife of Sir Henry Billingsley (c. 1538 – 1606) Lord Mayor of London.

== Death and burial ==
He died on 5 March 1584. He was buried in St Budock's Church, near Arwenack, where there is a mural monument to him, erected by his grandson in 1617, showing effigies of him and his wife facing each other kneeling in prayer. He died heavily in debt: his brother, the leading diplomat Sir Henry Killigrew, paid off some of his more pressing debts, but his son John entered on an inheritance which was already insolvent, and died a ruined man in 1605.

== In fiction ==
In the historical novel The Grove of Eagles by Winston Graham, Sir John's formidable widow Mary Wolverston ("old Lady Killigrew") is arguably the dominant character - the protagonist's highly intimidating grandmother. In her bitter old age, she regards the Killigrew family with contempt, but acknowledges that her husband was probably "the best of a poor lot".

Additionally, he appears in the novel The Sea Hawk by Raphael Sabatini, and in With the Knights of Malta by Douglas Valder Duff (using the pseudonym of Peter Wickloe).
