= John Gardiner (died 1586) =

English politician

John Gardiner (c. 1525 – 1586) was an English politician.

He was a Member (MP) of the Parliament of England for Penryn in 1558 and for Dorchester in 1563. He spent time in the Fleet after a property dispute. His brother, William Gardiner, was an MP for Barnstaple.
