= Sir Peter Killigrew, 2nd Baronet =

Member of the Parliament of England

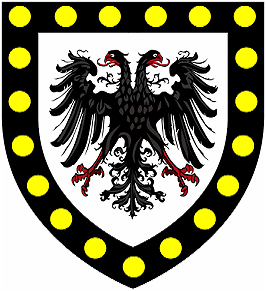
Arms of Killigrew: Argent, an eagle displayed with two heads sable a bordure of the second bezantée. The bezantée bordure indicates a connection to the ancient Earls of Cornwall

Sir Peter Killigrew, 2nd Baronet (c 1634 – 8 January 1705) of Arwenack, St Budock, Cornwall was an English politician who sat in the House of Commons in 1660.

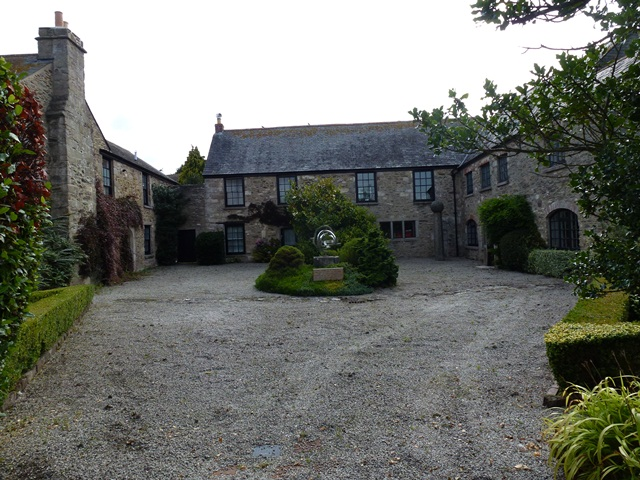
Arwenack today

== Origins ==
Killigrew was the son of Sir Peter Killigrew (c.1593-1668), Knight (4th son of John V Killigrew (c.1557-1605), of Arwenack, Cornwall, Vice-Admiral of Cornwall and the third Governor of Pendennis Castle), MP for Orkney, Shetland and Caithness in 1659 and for Helston in Cornwall from 1661 - July 1668, commonly known as Peter the Post, because of his great diligence in conveying messages to King Charles I during the Civil War. His mother was Mary Lucas, daughter of Thomas Lucas of St. John's Abbey, Colchester, and sister of Margaret Lucas, wife of William Cavendish, 1st Duke of Newcastle (1592-1676) and an attendant of Queen Henrietta Maria, wife of King Charles I, with whom she went into exile in France, having departed from Pendennis Castle near Arwenack, en route for the Scilly Isles.

== Career ==
In 1660, Killigrew was elected Member of Parliament for Camelford in the Convention Parliament. After a double return, he was seated on 5 May 1660, but his election was declared void 12 June 1660. He inherited the baronetcy on the death of his uncle Sir William Killigrew, 1st Baronet in 1665.

Killigrew died in 1705 and was buried at Falmouth. He had married Frances Twysden, daughter of Sir Roger Twysden, of East Peckham, Kent and had 2 sons and 2 daughters. His son George was killed in a duel in a tavern in Penryn. As his other son had also predeceased him the baronetcy became extinct. His Arwenack property passed to his daughter Anne, the wife of Martin Lister, who (Lister) thereupon adopted the name of Killigrew.

Baronetage of England
Preceded by William Killigrew	Baronet (of Arwennick); 1665–1705	Extinct
