= Arwenack =

Manor in Cornwall, England

- Arwynnek (Cornish)
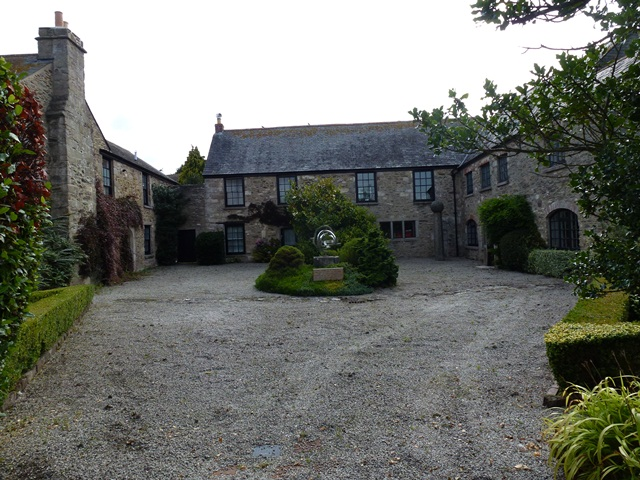
- Arwenack House today, remnant of the former fortified manor house

- Location within Cornwall
- 50.1504°N 5.0636°W
- Location: Falmouth, Cornwall, England

Listed Building – Grade II*
- Official name: Arwenack House/Arwenack Manor
- Designated: 22 July 1949
- Reference no.: 1270061

Arwenack (Cornish: Arwynnek) is a historic manor on the site of what is today the town of Falmouth, Cornwall, England, United Kingdom. Historically in the parish of St Budock, it was partly destroyed in 1646, and only a remnant survives today. It was long held by the Killigrew family, which was responsible for the development of the town of Falmouth, Sir Peter Killigrew (died 1667), MP, having received a royal charter for its foundation in 1661.

== Etymology ==
The name Arwenack comes from the Cornish language words ar, meaning 'facing' or 'on', and wynnek, meaning 'white'.

== Descent ==
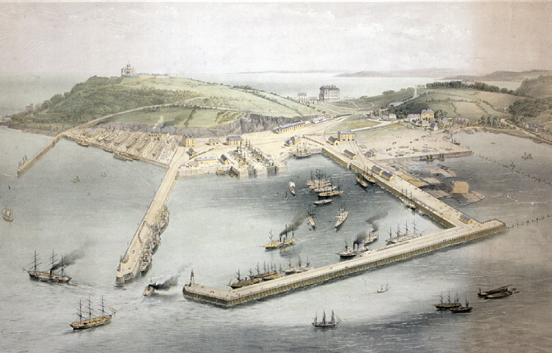
Aerial view circa 1870 from north-east of estate of Arwenack: left on top of hill: Pendennis Castle, built on land belonging to the Killigrew family. Right: Arwenack House. Centre: the developing harbour and town of Falmouth

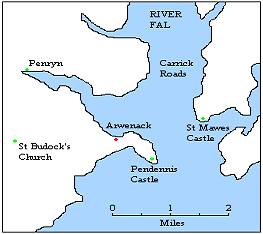
Map showing location of Arwenack, today the location of the town of Falmouth. The Carrick Roads are the world's third-largest natural harbour

=== de Arwenack ===
The earliest recorded lord of the manor of Arwenack was the de Arwenack family:

- Thomas de Arwenack
- John de Arwenack, son and heir
- Robert de Arwenack, son and heir, who died with no sons, leaving a daughter and sole heiress Jane de Arwenack, who married Simon Killigrew (fl.1377)

=== Killigrew ===
Ancient arms of Killigrew: Gules, three mascles or (Note: These mascle arms are also visible on the Wrey monument (see File:BlancheKilligrew TawstockChurch.JPG) now in Tawstock Church, Devon, (moved from St Ive Church, Cornwall) of Blanche Killigrew (died 1595) and her husband John Wrey (died 1597) of Trebeigh, St Ive, Cornwall. The monument was moved from St Ive Church to its present position against the east wall of the north transept of St Peter's Church, Tawstock, Devon, in 1924 by Sir Philip Bourchier Sherard Wrey, 12th Baronet (1858–1936), of Tawstock Court.(Pevsner, Nikolaus & Cherry, Bridget, The Buildings of England: Devon, London, 2004, p.790))

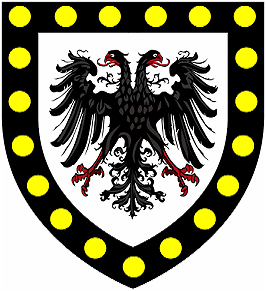
Modern arms of Killigrew: Argent, an eagle displayed with two heads sable a bordure of the second bezantée. The bezantée bordure reflects the border found in the arms of the ancient Earls of Cornwall

==== Simon Killigrew ====
Simon Killigrew (fl.1377), married Jane de Arwenack, daughter and sole heiress of Robert de Arwenack. He was the son of John Killigrew of Killigrew, by his wife Mary Poltesmore, daughter of Sir Richard Poltesmore, and was the first of the family to hold Arwenack.

==== Thomas Killigrew ====
Thomas Killigrew, son, whose wife was a member of the Beaupell family (possibly Beauple of Knowstone and Landkey in Devon, the heiress of which Margaret de Beaupel, married Sir Neil Loring, KG (c. 1320 – 1386), one of the founding members and 20th Knight of the Order of the Garter, established by King Edward III in 1348). He had two sons:

  - John Killigrew, Senior, of Arwenack, eldest son and heir (see below)
  - John Killigrew, Junior (died 1461), of Penryn (the local town to Arwenack), whose descendants soon inherited Arwenack. This branch of the family bore arms: Gules, three mascles or.

==== John Killigrew, senior ====
John Killigrew, senior, of Arwenack, eldest son and heir, who married Mary Boleigh, daughter and heiress of John Boleigh. The Killigrews later quartered the arms of Boleigh: Argent, on a chevron sable between three torteaux as many bezants, as visible on the monumental brass in St Budock's Church to John Killigrew (died 1567) of Arwenack, first Governor of Pendennis Castle.

==== John Killigrew (died pre-1513) ====
John Killigrew (died pre-1513), son and heir, who died with no sons, leaving a daughter and sole heiress Elizabeth Killigrew, wife of John Godolphin of Godolphin, Cornwall. The estates however descended to his younger brother as heir male under an entail.

==== Thomas Killigrew (died 1513) ====
Thomas Killigrew (died 1513), of Arwenack, younger brother. he died on 20 September 1513 at Biscay in the Kingdom of Aragon in Spain. He married twice, firstly to Jane Darrell, daughter and heiress of William Darrell of Andover, Hampshire, by whom he had a son and heir Alexander Killigrew, and secondly in 1512 to Johanna Herry, daughter of John Herry of Ruddeford (possibly John Harris of Radford)

==== Alexander Killigrew (born 1493) ====
Alexander Killigrew (born 1493), of Arwenack, eldest son and heir by his father's first marriage. He appears to have died without children since his heir was his second cousin once removed John Killigrew (died 1567), the son of his second cousin John Killigrew (died 1536) of Penryn by his wife Jane Petit, daughter and co-heiress of John Petit of Ardevera.

==== John Killigrew (died 1567) ====
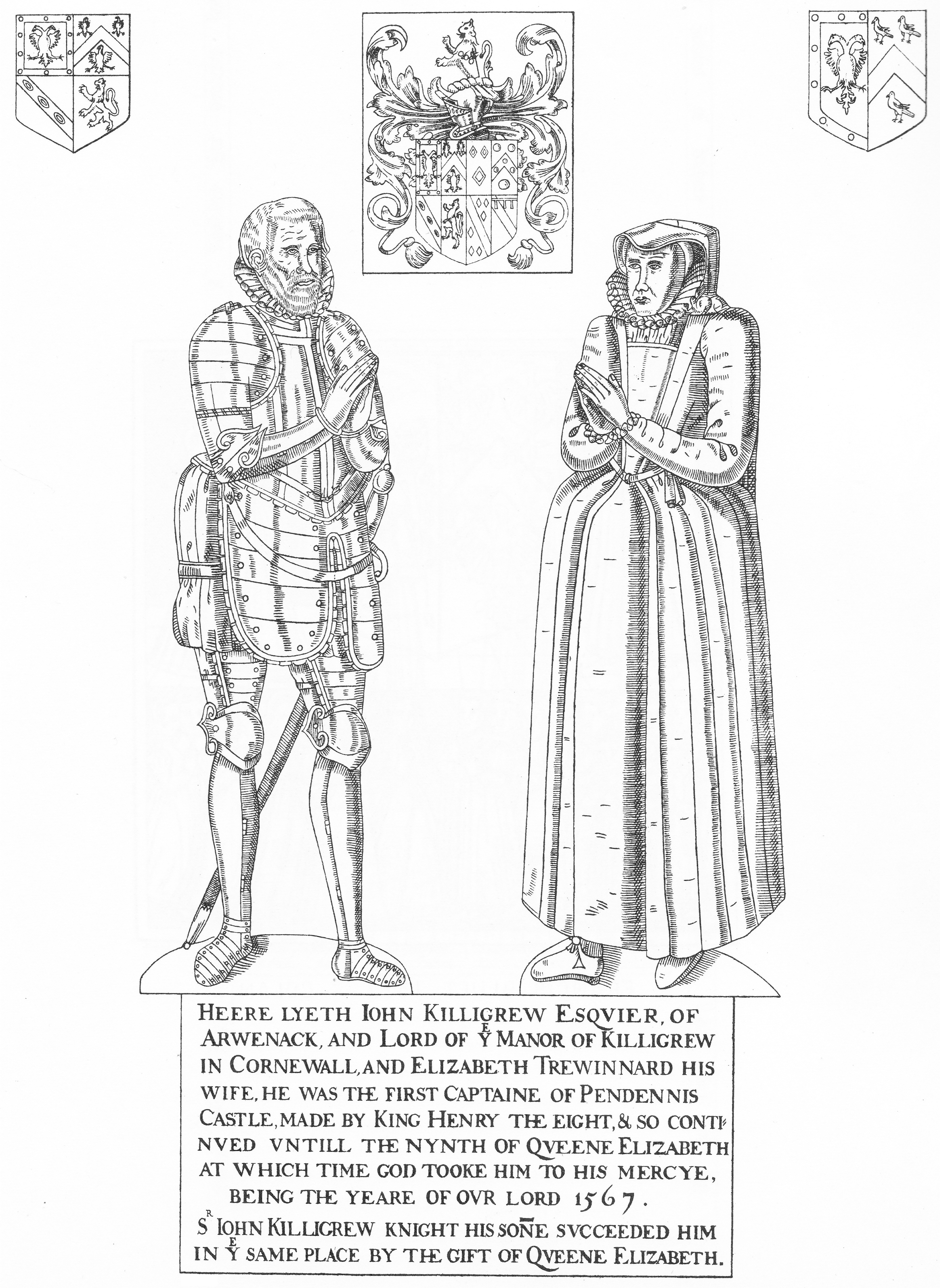
Monumental brass of John Killigrew (died 1567) of Arwenack, Falmouth, first Governor of Pendennis Castle. St Budock's Church, Budock Water, near Falmouth

John Killigrew (died 1567) of Arwenack, second cousin once removed of Alexander Killigrew (born 1493), of Arwenack. He was the first Governor of Pendennis Castle, situated on land within the Arwenack estate on the tip of a peninsula about 1 mile south-east of Arwenack House, appointed by King Henry VIII. He married Elizabeth Trewennard, 2nd daughter of James Trewennard of Trewennard, in the parish of St Erth. His monumental brass survives in St Budock's Church, Budock Water, immediately to the west of Arwenack, inscribed as follows:

"Heere lyeth John Killigrew, Esquier, of Arwenack and lord of ye manor of Killigrew in Cornewall, and Elizabeth Trewinnard his wife. He was the first Captaine of Pendennis Castle, made by King Henry the eight and so continued untill the nynth of Queene Elizabeth at which time God tooke him to his mercye, being the yeare of Our Lord 1567. S^{r} John Killigrew, Knight, his son(n)e succeeded him in ye same place by the gift of Queene Elizabeth".

He rebuilt Arwenack House, described by Martin Lister-Killigrew (died 1745) as "the finest and most costly then in the county, as to this time in part appears by the stately hall window thereof, still standing, and was possessed of one of the largest estates in the county, his lands on those parts extending from Arwenack, to Helford passage, and had the propriety of sixteen parish tythes". Despite their rich inheritance, later generations of the family were chronically debt-ridden. He had five sons, including:

- Sir John Killigrew (died 1584) of Arwenack, eldest son and heir, 2nd Governor of Pendennis Castle, (see below).
- Peter Killigrew (died 1603), 2nd son, Controller of Customs at Plymouth and Fowey.
- Sir Henry Killigrew (c. 1528 – 1603), 4th son, an ambassador to Queen Elizabeth I and Member of Parliament for Newport & Launceston in 1553, Saltash in 1563 and for Truro in 1571-2.
- Sir William Killigrew (died 1622) of Hanworth, Middlesex, 5th son, Groom of the Privy Chamber to King James I, several of whose descendants were also royal courtiers and were buried in Westminster Abbey where survive various monuments to the family.

He also had several daughters, including

- Margaret, who married Sir Francis Godolphin (1540-1608).
- Alice, who married Richard Bonython of Carclew House.
- Jane, who married John Michell of Harlyn, M.P., Mayor of Truro
- Grace, who married John Trethurffe of Trethurffe, Ladock.

==== Sir John Killigrew (died 1584) ====
Sir John Killigrew (died 1584) of Arwenack, son, 2nd Governor of Pendennis Castle (1568–1584) appointed by Queen Elizabeth I, as stated on his father's brass in St Budock's Church. He was MP for Lostwithiel in 1563 and twice for the family's pocket borough of Penryn, in 1571 and 1572. Together with his father he opposed the Catholic Queen Mary (1553–1558) and her Spanish husband, and used his fleet of ships to keep the Protestant exiles in France abreast of political developments and attacked Spanish shipping in the Channel. In 1556 he was imprisoned by Mary with his father in the Fleet, but released after three weeks. On the succession of the Protestant Queen Elizabeth I (1558–1603), he was restored to royal favour. He became notorious for engaging in cattle theft, "evil usage in keeping of a castle" and as a Justice of the peace for abuses in arranging the quarter sessions. Having been appointed a Commissioner to inquire into piracy, he himself was heavily engaged in that activity and traded with smugglers and pirates who frequented the waters around Arwenack. He was the subject of an official investigation in 1565. In January 1582 both he and his wife Mary Wolverston (Note: Sources are very confused as to the identity of the female Killigrew supposed to have been engaged in piracy, the most reliable ones giving her as Mary Wolverston) were suspected of involvement in a notorious act of piracy concerning a Spanish ship which had sheltered from a storm in an anchorage opposite Arwenack. It was said that he and his wife had acted together to overpower or murder the crew and steal the cargo of cloth, before ordering the ship to be disposed of in Ireland. (Note: Fuidge; The original source for this famous story, which has been much added to and embroidered by several writers, is Calendar of State Papers, Domestic, 15 January 1582 & 2 March 1582) He married Mary Wolverston, daughter of Philip Wolverston (often described as a "gentleman pirate") of Wolverston Hall in Suffolk, and widow of Henry Knyvett. A mural monument to the couple was erected by their son in St Budock's Church, showing them facing each other kneeling in prayer. His youngest daughter Katherine Killigrew (died 1598) became the 3rd wife of Sir Henry Billingsley (c. 1538 – 1606) Lord Mayor of London.

==== John Killigrew (c. 1557 – 1605) ====
John Killigrew (c. 1557 – 1605), of Arwennack, son, was Vice-Admiral of Cornwall and the third Governor of Pendennis Castle (1584–98)(from which office he was ejected in 1598), and was three times MP for Penryn in 1584, 1586 and 1597. He had notorious dealings with local pirates. Due to his father's debts and his own extravagance he died in poverty. He married Dorothy Monck, a daughter of Sir Thomas Monk of Potheridge, Merton, Devon. By his wife he had children 6 sons and 4 daughters, including:

- Sir John Killigrew (1583–1633), of Arwenack, eldest son and heir, who died without children and was succeeded by his younger brother Sir Peter Killigrew (1593–1668).
- Sir Peter Killigrew (1593–1668), MP, 4th son.
- Sir William Killigrew, 1st Baronet (died 1665), 6th son, created a baronet at the Restoration of the Monarchy in 1660, which event was largely brought about by his uncle the Duke of Albemarle. As he was childless the title was created with special remainder to his nephew Peter Killigrew (1634–1705), son of his elder brother Peter Killigrew (1593–1667), MP for Camelford.
- Elizabeth Killigrew, wife of Edmond Yeo (died 1636) of North Petherwin in Cornwall and Chittlehampton in Devon, son of Leonard Yeo (died 1624) (Note: Date of death 1624 per his inscribed monumental brass in North Petherwin Church) of North Petherwin, a junior branch of the ancient Yeo family of Heanton Satchville, Petrockstowe in Devon.

==== Sir John Killigrew (1583–1633) ====
Sir John Killigrew (1583–1633), the eldest son, married Jane Fermor, daughter of Sir George Fermor of Northampton. She was confused by the Cornwall historian William Hals (1655–1737) in his History of Cornwall for her grandmother-in-law the pirate Mary Wolverston. She was accused by her husband of engaging in prostitution and is said to have been "first debauched by the Governor of Pendennis Castle". He at last obtained a divorce in the Court of the Archbishop of Canterbury, but at such great expense that he faced ruin. He died without children, the last of the "John Killigrews" of Arwenack, and was succeeded by his younger brother Peter. Lady Jane had been supported by the mayor and corporation of Penryn, which borough was jealous to preserve its ancient pre-eminence in face of the growing town of Falmouth, fostered by the Killigrews. She fled to Penryn where she was hospitably received by the mayor and corporation, to whom, after her husband's death in 1633 she presented a two-foot high silver cup inscribed:

"1633. From Maior to Maior. To the Town of Permarin where they received mee that was in great misery. Kane Killygrew".

Her husband was described as a sober and good man, but one who was always unfortunate.

==== Sir Peter Killigrew (c. 1593 – 1668) ====
Sir Peter Killigrew (c. 1593 – 1668), younger brother, MP for Orkney, Shetland and Caithness in 1659 and for Helston in Cornwall from 1661 - July 1668, known as Peter the Post from the speed and efficiency with which during the Civil War he despatched messages and other commissions entrusted to him in the cause of King Charles I". He was briefly Governor of Pendennis Castle from March to September 1660. He inherited Arwenack in 1633 on the death of his elder brother without children. he married Mary Lucas, daughter of Thomas Lucas, MP, of St. John's Abbey, Colchester, and sister of Margaret Lucas, wife of William Cavendish, 1st Duke of Newcastle (1592–1676) and an attendant of Queen Henrietta Maria, wife of King Charles I, with whom she went into exile in France, having departed with her son prince Charles in 1644 from Pendennis Castle near Arwenack, en route for the Scilly Isles. His support for the Royalists during the Civil War caused the destruction of Arwenack House by the Parliamentarians during their 5-month siege of Pendennis Castle in 1646. It was never rebuilt again on the former grand scale. He obtained a grant to hold markets at Smithwick, next to Arwenack, which became the nucleus of the town of Falmouth, for the establishment of which new town in 1661 he received a royal charter from King Charles II, following the Restoration of the Monarchy. The document refers to Sir Peter Killigrew as "our beloved and faithful subject" and states that it is given "in consideration of the good, faithful, and acceptable services, by him the said Peter as well to Us, as to our most dear Father, the Lord Charles, late king of England (of glorious memory)" He received licence to transfer of the customs house from Penryn to Falmouth and established a new parish (separate from St Budock's) for his new town served by a new church dedicated to "King Charles the Martyr", the executed Charles I, in which he was buried in 1668.

==== Sir Peter Killigrew, 2nd Baronet (1634–1705) ====
Sir Peter Killigrew, 2nd Baronet (1634–1705), son, who inherited his uncle's baronetcy under the special remainder. In 1660 he was elected Member of Parliament for Camelford in Cornwall, which election was declared void later the same year. He married Frances Twisden (died 1711), a daughter and co-heiress of Sir Roger Twisden, of East Peckham, Kent. In 1697 he moved away from Arwenack to Ludlow in Shropshire, where he died in 1705, but was returned for burial in Falmouth. By his wife he had the following children:

- Peter Killigrew, died an infant
- George Killigrew (died 1687), who predeceased his father, having been killed in a duel in a tavern in Penryn by Captain Walter Vincent, Barrister-at-Law. He married Anne St Aubyn, daughter of Sir John St Aubyn, Baronet, by whom he had a daughter Amye Killigrew (living in 1743), wife of Major John Dunbar of Bally Carney, Ireland.
- Frances Killigrew (died 1736), eldest daughter and co-heiress, wife of Richard Erissey, by whom she had an only daughter and sole heiress to Arwenack, Mary Erissey (died 1718), who in 1711 had married Col. John West of Bury St Edmunds in Suffolk.
- Anne Killigrew (died 1727), youngest daughter and co-heiress, wife of Martin Lister (1666–1745), born at Liston in Staffordshire, who under the terms of her father's will adopted the additional surname of Killigrew. The marriage was childless.

=== Lister-Killigrew ===
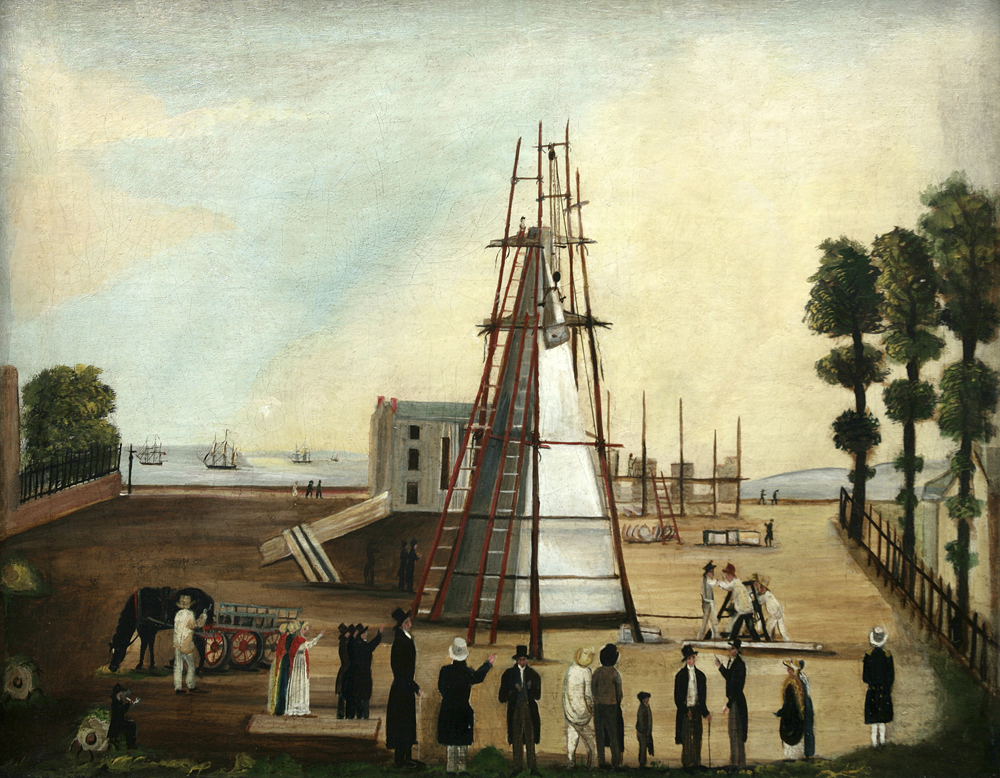
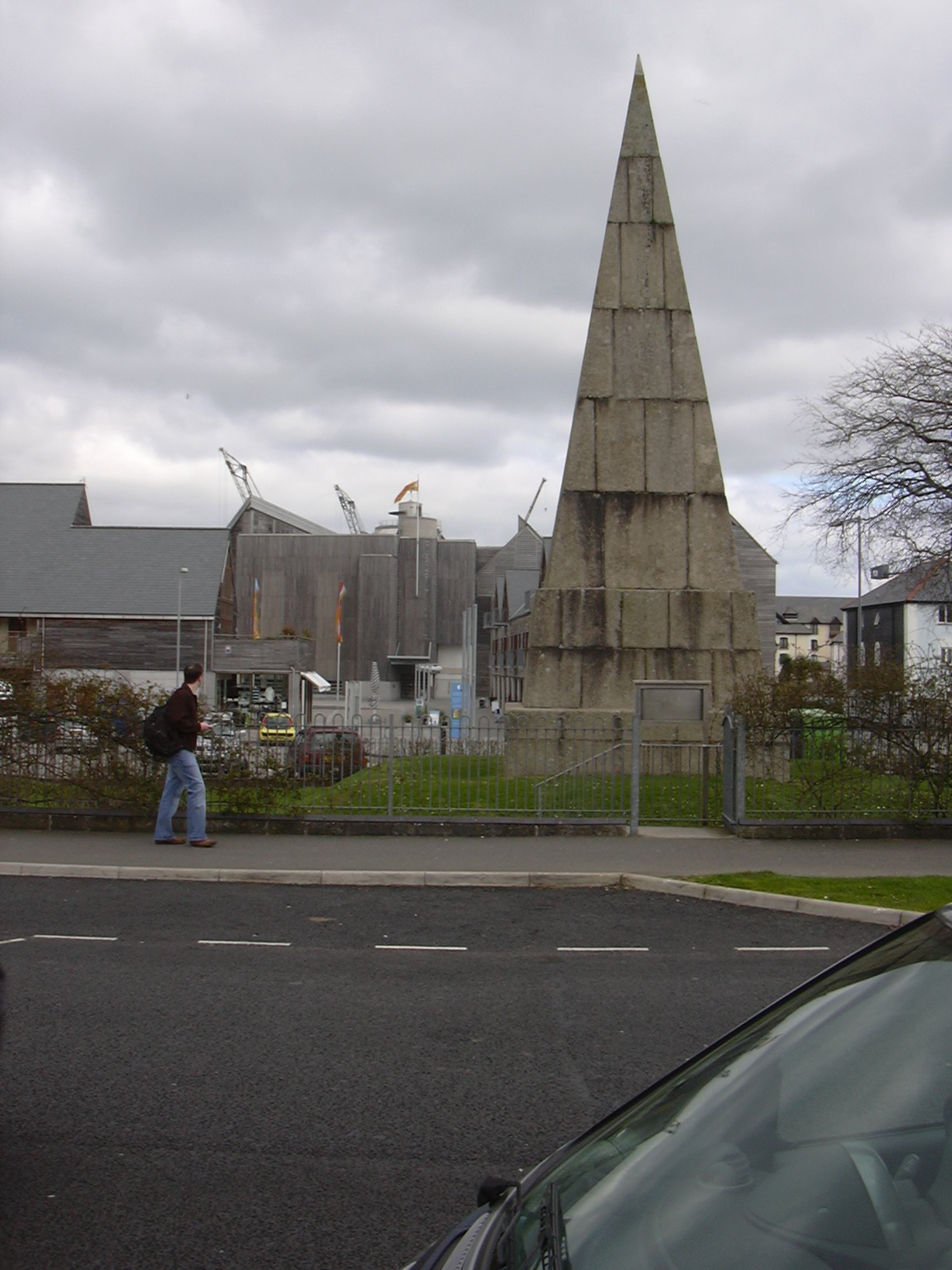
The Killigrew Pyramid, between Arwenack House and the waterfront, Falmouth. (Note: Erected in 1737/8 by Martin Lister (died 1745), of Staffordshire, who adopted the surname Killigrew in lieu of his patronymic, having married in 1689 Anne Killigrew (died 1727), youngest daughter of Sir Peter Killigrew, 2nd Baronet (died 1705), of Arwenack. He died without children, being thus the last of the Killigrews. He wrote the History of the Killigrew Family.) Left: oil painting of deconstruction prior to move in 1836/8, Falmouth Art Gallery. Right: the same view today, with viewer's back to Arwenack house. (Note: Tregellas (1884): "This monument was originally placed on a site which overlooked on one side the remains of the family mansion, and on the other the little lake (formerly an arm of the sea, and known in Leland's time as 'Levine Prisklo'), which was once the well-filled swannery of the Killigrews. It was moved in 1836 to make way for the houses now known as 'Grove Place' and again in 1871 to its present appropriate site opposite the Arwenack Manor-office")

Martin Lister Killigrew (1666–1745) was born Martin Lister, of Liston, Staffordshire, and as a junior army officer was stationed at Pendennis Castle during the Governorship of the Earl of Bath. In 1689 at the time he resigned from the army he married Anne Killigrew (died 1727), the youngest daughter of Sir Peter Killigrew, 2nd Baronet (died 1705), of Arwenack, the last male Killigrew of Arwenack. Under the terms of his wife's inheritance, on his marriage he adopted the additional surname of Killigrew, but died childless when the ancient name became extinct at Arwenack, and the estate became the inheritance of Lord Wodehouse. He wrote a history of the Killigrew family, which is the main source for the early history of Falmouth. He left Falmouth in 1725 and in 1737 wrote a series of letters to his steward at Arwenack, Abraham Hall, instructing him to build a stone pyramid monument at Arwenack. His instructions were detailed, but he insisted there should be no inscription. It stood originally in the centre of a grove of trees, but in 1836 was moved to the hilltop at the southern end of The Avenue, and was again moved to its present position on Arwenack Green in 1871. As a junior soldier he witnessed the brutal hangings of rebels in July 1685 at Taunton by Lieutenant General Percy Kirke (died 1691) following the Battle of Sedgemoor, and wrote an account of it which was eventually published by in the Sun newspaper of London on 3 September 1796.

== In literature ==
Arwenack is the setting for the historical novel The Grove of Eagles by Winston Graham, which chronicles the lives of the Killigrew family in the 1590s. The narrator, an illegitimate son of John Killigrew, notes the extraordinary unhappiness and ill-fortune which visited so many of those who lived in Arwenack in his lifetime, and led to a local legend that Arwenack was under a curse. The narrator's own view was that the only curse was excessive ambition: his great-grandfather, Sir John Killigrew, had built his new house on a scale so lavish that it drained the family's resources, so that "from his time on, there was always a hint of the feverish and the insolvent in our lives".

== Sources ==
- Baring Gould, Sabine, Cornish Characters and Strange Events, London, 1909, Dame Killigrew
- Gay, Susan E. Old Falmouth, The Story of the town from the days of the Killigrews to the earliest part of the 19th Century Second Impression, 1903. See also Miss Susan Gay's Falmouth chronology
- Gilbert, Davies (1767–1839), (ed.), Parochial History of Cornwall, Founded of the Manuscript Histories of Mr Hals (Hals, William (1655–1737), History of Cornwall) and Mr Tonkin, 4 vols., Vol. 2, Exeter, 1838.
- Dunkin, Edwin Hadlow Wise, The Monumental Brasses of Cornwall with Descriptive, Genealogical and Heraldic Notes, 1882.
- Hals, William (1655–1737), History of Cornwall
- Jeffery, H. M., (ed.), "Two Historical Sketches of the Killigrew Family of Arwenack Composed by Martin Lister Killigrew in 1737-8 and Known as the Killigrew MS and the Falmouth MS"; Journal of the Royal Institution of Cornwall, Vol.9, pp. 182 et seq.
- Lister-Killigrew, Martin. History of the Killigrew Family, published (in part) in: Journal of the Royal Institution of Cornwall, Vol III, 1868-70.
- Lysons, Magna Britannia, Vol.3, Cornwall, 1814, pp. 102–3, "Arwenack"
- Tregellas, Walter Hawken (1831–1894), Cornish Worthies, 1884, Vol.2, pp. 115–195, The Killigrews: Diplomatists, Warriors, Courtiers and Poets
- Vivian, Lt.Col. J. L., (ed.) The Visitations of Cornwall: Comprising the Heralds' Visitations of 1530, 1573 & 1620 ; with additions by J. L. Vivian, Exeter, 1887.
- Vivian, Lt.Col. J. L., (ed.) The Visitations of the County of Devon: Comprising the Heralds' Visitations of 1531, 1564 & 1620. Exeter, 1895.
- Whitley, H. M., Journal of the Royal Institution of Cornwall, Vol. VII, 1881-3, p. 286, re account of piracy of Mary Wolverston, wife of Sir John Killigrew (died 1584). This is the most reliable account, followed by Baring-Gould. Inaccurate report on Piracy of Lady Killigrew, as noted by Baring-Gould.
- Heritage Gateway, "Arwenack"
