= William Dodington (MP for Penryn and Boston) =

English Member of Parliament

William Dodington (died 1600), of Aldersgate, London; Fulham, Middlesex, and Breamore, Hampshire, was an English Member of Parliament. He was a Member (MP) of the Parliament of England for Penryn in 1571 and for Boston in 1572.
