= Henry Killigrew (diplomat) =

English Member of Parliament and diplomat (c. 1528–1603)

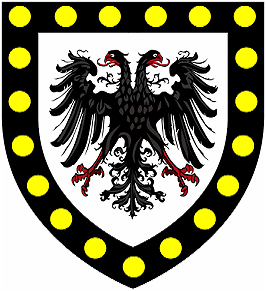
Arms of Killigrew: Argent, an eagle displayed with two heads sable a bordure of the second bezantée. The bezantée bordure indicates a connection to the ancient Earls of Cornwall

Sir Henry Killigrew (c. 1528 – 1603) was a diplomat and an ambassador for the Kingdom of England in the sixteenth century. He was several times employed by Elizabeth I in Scottish affairs and served as one of the English appointees to the Council of State of the Netherlands in the United Provinces in 1586 and 1587–1589. He served as a Member of Parliament for Newport & Launceston in 1553, for Saltash in 1563, and for Truro in 1571–2.

== Career ==
He was the fourth son of John III Killigrew (d.1567) of Arwenack, the first Governor of Pendennis Castle, of an old Cornish family, by his wife Elizabeth, second daughter of James Trewenard of Trewenard. He was probably educated at Cambridge, but there is no definite information on the point. Killigrew served as a gentleman in the household of John Dudley, Duke of Northumberland, and became a lifelong follower of the Dudleys.

On 18 February 1553, he was returned as one of the members of parliament for Newport-juxta-Launceston. He assisted Sir Peter Carew in escaping to the continent in January 1554, and during the remainder of Queen Mary of England's reign appears to have been in exile. Killigrew was in Paris in July 1556, when he was described by the English authorities as a rebel. From a French base, he and his brother Peter engaged in piracy.

In August 1557, Henry was present at the Battle of St. Quentin, where Sir James Melville stated of him that "Harry Killygrew, an Englis gentilman, my auld friend", held his horse while he got his wound dressed after his escape. Killigrew was recalled to England on the accession of Elizabeth, and she employed him on various diplomatic missions, including one to Germany in connection with negotiations for a defensive league.

In July 1559, he went for a short time to assist Nicholas Throckmorton in France. While Francis II of France was hunting at houses and estates belonging to the Duke of Guise in September 1559, Throckmorton, John Somers, and Killigrew toured Lorraine, visiting Toul, Metz, Thionville, Nancy, Saint-Nicolas-de-Port, and Saint-Dizier.

Killigrew counted both Robert Dudley, Earl of Leicester and William Cecil, Lord Burghley as his patrons. He wrote to Dudley in 1562, regarding their Protestant policies: "In these cases, I take you to be as one". In July 1562 he led a military contingent at Rouen, as part of the Newhaven expedition.

In June 1566, he was sent on a mission from Elizabeth to Mary, Queen of Scots, for the "declaration of sundry things necessary to be reformed between them for the preservation of their amity", and to congratulate her on the birth of Prince James. One issue was an accusation that a parrott sent to Mary had been stolen at Berwick-upon-Tweed. On 24 June 1566, the Earl of Moray escorted him to Edinburgh Castle where he met the Earl of Mar and went to the Queen's bedside, and after speaking with her, he saw Prince James with his wet-nurse. He returned to England in July. After the murder of Darnley he was sent to Scotland with a special message to the Queen of Scots, which he delivered to her "in a dark chamber".

On 20 April 1572, he was elected M.P. for Truro. In September, shortly after the St. Bartholomew's Day Massacre, he was again sent to Scotland, in connection with the negotiations for the surrender of the Queen of Scots to the Protestant lords, who would then immediately execute her. He was assisted by a Scottish courtier Nicolas Elphinstone to gain the support of Regent Mar and the Earl of Morton. This was a scheme so secret that, apart from Killigrew, only Queen Elizabeth, Cecil and Leicester were privy to it on the English part. Due to the Regent Mar's sudden death, nothing came of it.

Killigrew ultimately succeeded in persuading Elizabeth to send an English force to assist in the siege of Edinburgh Castle, and in numerous letters to Burghley minutely described the siege, and the negotiations, some involving Nicolas Errington, connected with its surrender. Killigrew suggested sending some intercepted letters to his former colleague in Paris, John Somers, for deciphering.

After Edinburgh Castle fell in June 1573 he negotiated the removal of cannon from Hume Castle and the keeping of jewels belonging to Mary, Queen of Scots, including the "Great H of Scotland" disputed by Agnes Keith and Regent Morton. Morton gave him a gilt and engraved silver basin, three covered cups, a silver salt, and a gold ring. Killigrew saw the young King James dance at Stirling Castle.

A year later Killigrew reported that Regent Morton had discovered a letter from William Kirkcaldy of Grange the defeated and executed commander of the castle, to Mary, Queen of Scots, in which he listed the locations of the jewels she had left behind in Scotland, and that William Drury, Marshall of Berwick, had taken some jewels in pledge for a loan of £600. In August 1574, he was approached by the Flemish mining entrepreneur Cornelius de Vos, who wanted to negotiate with William Cecil.

Killigrew was sent back to Scotland in May 1575 to discuss with Regent Morton Elizabeth's refusal to make a formal mutual league with Scotland, pensions for the Regent and the nobility, and the custody of Mary, Queen of Scots.

Subsequently, he was employed in similar diplomatic missions in Scotland, Germany, France, and the Low Countries. The Treaty of Nonsuch gave the English crown the right to designate two councillors to the Dutch council of state. Killigrew served as an English Councillor on the Dutch Council of State in 1586, and again in 1587–1589. While in attendance on the Earl of Essex in France he was knighted on 22 November 1591. He was the first in England to write political memoirs to highlight and defend his actions during his career as a public servant. He died in the spring of 1603, his will having been proved on 16 April.

== Artistic activities ==
David Lloyd praises Killigrew in his Worthies for his learning and his artistic accomplishments. He states that, while a good musician, he was especially skilled as a painter, being "a Dürer for proportion ... an Angelo for his happy fancy, and an Holbein for oyl works", but no authenticated work of his brush is known. Killigrew gave £140 to Emmanuel College, Cambridge, for the purchase of St. Nicholas Hostel, the materials of which were applied to the construction of the lodge for Dr Laurence Chaderton, the first master. His London residence was in Lothbury.

== Family ==
Killigrew lived in Hanworth in Middlesex and Falmouth in Cornwall. On 4 November 1566 Killigrew married in the church of St Peter Le Poer, London, Catherine, fourth daughter of Sir Anthony Cooke and Anne Fitzwilliam. He thus became Cecil's brother-in-law. His wife died in 1583. On 7 November 1590, he was married in the same church to Jaél de Peigne, a French Huguenot. She was naturalised in June 1601. After Henry's death, she remarried on 19 April 1617 George Downham, Bishop of Derry, and died around 1632.

By his first wife, Killigrew had four daughters:

- Anne, married first to Sir Henry Neville, and secondly to George Carleton, bishop of Chichester
- Elizabeth, married first to Sir Jonathan Trelawny, secondly to Sir Thomas Reynell, and thirdly to Sir Thomas Lower.
- Mary, married to Sir Reginald Mohun
- Dorothy, married to Sir Edward Seymour.

By his second wife, he had a daughter and two sons:

- Jane
- Joseph
- Henry

Joseph, ten years old at his father's death, succeeded to his estates.

== In fiction ==
He is a major character in the historical novel The Grove of Eagles by Winston Graham, which shows him in a generally sympathetic light. The novel turns largely on the declining fortunes of his nephew John Killigrew of Arwenack, who looks in vain to his uncle's influence to protect him from bankruptcy (in real life Henry did frequently help out his nephew financially, but could not prevent his ultimate ruin). Henry is portrayed as one of the few advisers whom the Queen really trusts: "as close to her as a Father Confessor". Another character notes that while many courtiers come and go, a few like Henry serve the Queen decade after decade. His second marriage to Jael de Peigne is shown as being somewhat troubled, as his beautiful and much younger wife is discreetly unfaithful to him.
