= Penryn (constituency) =

Former United Kingdom parliamentary borough

- Former borough constituency for the House of Commons
- County: Cornwall
- Major settlements: Penryn

1553–1832
- Seats: Two
- Replaced by: Penryn & Falmouth

Penryn was a parliamentary borough in Cornwall, which elected two Members of Parliament (MPs) to the House of Commons of England from 1553 until 1707, to the House of Commons of Great Britain from 1707 to 1800, and finally to the House of Commons of the United Kingdom from 1801 to 1832. Elections were held using the bloc vote system.

The Reform Act 1832 abolished the parliamentary borough of Penryn. The town of Penryn was combined with neighbouring Falmouth to form the new parliamentary borough of Penryn and Falmouth.

== History ==
=== Franchise ===
The borough consisted of the town of Penryn, a market town in the west of Cornwall, two miles from the Killigrew seat of Arwenack House (which in the 17th century became the nucleus of the town of Falmouth). In the 16th century the Killigrew family owned the fee farm of Penryn borough, and thus had a strong influence in the borough of Penryn. The right to vote was exercised by all inhabitants paying scot and lot, which in prosperous Penryn made for a big enough electorate to ensure competitive elections; in the 18th century the number with the right to vote varied between 130 and 200, and by 1831 over 500 were qualified.

Nevertheless, Penryn recognised "patrons", important local landowners who were allowed influence in the choice of MPs. In the mid 18th century, the patrons were Lord Edgcumbe and Viscount Falmouth, both prominent "election managers" for the Whig government; but Edgcumbe's influence was much more secure than Falmouth's. Sir Lewis Namier, in his ground-breaking study of the elections of the 1750s and 1760s, took Penryn as one of his case studies. He quotes a contemporary source that Penryn prided itself "upon having had representatives of name and note", and the patrons' continued influence seems to have rested partly on their finding candidates for Penryn who fitted the voters' feeling of self-worth.

=== The election of 1761 ===
In 1761, another influential local figure, Francis Basset, challenged the Edgcumbe and Falmouth domination. Edgcumbe had proposed the famous Admiral, George Rodney, while Falmouth's candidate was the less well-known Sir Edward Turner. Basset put up two candidates of his own, Edmund Maskelyne and George Clive, a London banker and cousin of the famous general "Clive of India", and there followed a vigorously contested and expensive election. Clive had paid his own expenses in the contest, but four years later still owed his cousin 2,000 guineas which had lent him for the purpose, which gives some idea of the scale of expenditure involved.

The politics of the period was complicated by the accession of King George III the previous year, which had disrupted many of the established party and factional alignments. A forged letter was apparently circulated in Penryn, seeming to show that Prime Minister Newcastle supported the Basset candidates, and this swayed a number of votes among Customs officers, who depended on government favour for their livelihood.

The Falmouth and Edgcumbe candidates won, receiving 68 votes each compared to 63 for Clive and 61 for Maskelyne, but from this point onwards the Falmouth influence was broken and in future elections it was Basset who found himself with the power of nomination in Penryn.

=== After the 1760s ===
Later in the century the patronage came to be shared between Basset and the Duke of Leeds, though in the last years before Reform Basset's son (who became Lord de Dunstanville) was allowed to exercise patronage alone on the understanding that he did not interfere in the Duke's other Cornish borough, Helston. Elections were generally contested, and the outcome was often a sharing of the representation with one Whig and one Tory returned. In this final period, elections in Penryn became notoriously corrupt, although as Namier suggests the notoriety may have arisen chiefly from the fact the bribery now involved private citizens on both sides instead of the government being complicit in it. In 1828, two years before the first attempt to pass a general Reform Act, the Whigs picked Penryn as a suitable case for an attempt at more limited reform after an election where voters were reportedly treated to a "breakfast" worth 24 guineas a head; they proposed a bill in the House of Commons to disfranchise Penryn and transfer its two seats to Manchester. First an act was rushed through Parliament to indemnify witnesses to the alleged corruption giving evidence on the disfranchising bill; which latter bill was, however, defeated because there was at this point a Tory majority opposed to Reform.

Unlike most of the Cornish rotten boroughs before 1832, Penryn was a town of reasonable size: in 1831, the population of the borough was 3,251, and contained 654 houses, which would have been big enough for Penryn to retain one of its two MPs under the Reform Act. However, neighbouring Falmouth was a much larger town and had no borough representation; the decision was therefore taken to extend the borough's boundaries to take in Falmouth, as well as parts of Budock and St Gluvias, which raised the population to 11,881. This newly delineated borough, which elected two MPs, was renamed Penryn and Falmouth.

== Members of Parliament ==
=== MPs 1553–1629 ===
First Parliament of 1553	John Johnson	Humphrey Corbet
Second Parliament of 1553	John Ayleworth	Ralph Skinner
Parliament of 1554	William Bendelows	Not known
Parliament of 1554-1555	James Trewynnard	Thomas Matthew
Parliament of 1555	John Courtenay	Ralph Cooke
Parliament of 1558	John Gardiner	John Couche, junior
Parliament of 1559	John Cosworth	John Bowyer
Parliament of 1563-1567	John Cosworth	John Bowyer
Parliament of 1571	John Killigrew (d.1584), of Arwenack (1571, 1572)	William Dodington
Parliament of 1572-1581	John Killigrew (d.1584), of Arwenack (1571, 1572)	Robert Petre
Parliament of 1584-1585	John Killigrew (c.1557-1605) of Arwenack (1584, 1586, 1597)	William Killigrew
Parliament of 1586-1587	John Killigrew (c.1557-1605) of Arwenack (1584, 1586, 1597)	William Onslow
Parliament of 1588-1589	Nicholas Saunders	Anthony Dillon
Parliament of 1593	John Osborne	Edward Phelips
Parliament of 1597-1598	John Killigrew (c.1557-1605) of Arwenack (1584, 1586, 1597)	Edward Jones
Parliament of 1601	Edward Seymour	Richard Messenger
Parliament of 1604-1611	Sir Richard Warburton died Sir William Maynard (1609-1611)	Thomas Prowse died Sir Edward Conway (1610-1611)
Addled Parliament (1614)	Sir William Killigrew	(Sir) Francis Crane
Parliament of 1621-1622	Robert Jermyn	(Sir) Francis Crane
Happy Parliament (1624-1625)	Edward Roberts	Sir Robert Killigrew
Useless Parliament (1625)	Edward Roberts	Sir Edwin Sandys
Parliament of 1625-1626	Edward Roberts	Sir Edwin Sandys
Parliament of 1628-1629	William Killigrew	Sir Thomas Edmunds
No Parliament summoned 1629-1640

=== MPs 1640–1832 ===
Year	First member	First party	Second member	Second party
April 1640	Sir Richard Vyvyan	Royalist	Joseph Hall	Parliamentarian
November 1640	Sir Nicholas Slanning	Royalist	John Bampfylde	Parliamentarian
August 1642	Slanning disabled from sitting - seat vacant		John Bampfylde	Parliamentarian
December 1648	Slanning disabled from sitting - seat vacant		Bampfylde excluded in Pride's Purge - seat vacant	
1653	Penryn was unrepresented in the Barebones Parliament			
1654	John Fox		Penryn had only one seat in the First and Second Parliaments of the Protectorate	
1656	John Fox		Penryn had only one seat in the First and Second Parliaments of the Protectorate	
January 1659	John Fox		Thomas Silly	
May 1659	Not represented in the restored Rump			
April 1660	Samuel Enys		James Robyns	
1661	William Pendarves		John Birch	
1673	Sir Robert Southwell		John Birch	
February 1679	Sir Robert Southwell		Francis Trefusis	
September 1679	Sir Nicholas Slanning		Charles Smythe	
1685	Sir Nicholas Slanning		Henry Fanshawe	
1689	Anthony Rowe		Alexander Pendarves	Tory
March 1690	Samuel Rolle		Alexander Pendarves	Tory
April 1690	Sidney Godolphin		Alexander Pendarves	Tory
1695	James Vernon	Whig	Alexander Pendarves	Tory
1698	James Vernon	Whig	Samuel Trefusis	Tory
1699	Alexander Pendarves	Tory	Samuel Trefusis	Tory
1705	James Vernon	Whig	Samuel Trefusis	Tory
1710	Alexander Pendarves	Tory	Samuel Trefusis	Tory
1713	Alexander Pendarves	Tory	Hugh Boscawen	Whig
1714	Samuel Trefusis	Tory	Hugh Boscawen	Whig
1720	Samuel Trefusis	Tory	Viscount Rialton	Whig
1722	Sidney Meadows		Edward Vernon	Tory
1727	Sir Cecil Bishopp		Edward Vernon	Tory
1734	Sir Richard Mill		John Clavering	
1741	John Evelyn	Whig	Edward Vernon	Tory
1743 by-election	John Evelyn	Whig	George Boscawen	
1747	Henry Seymour Conway	Whig	George Boscawen	
1754	Richard Edgcumbe		George Boscawen	
1758	John Plumptre		George Boscawen	
1761	Sir Edward Turner	Whig	George Brydges Rodney	
1766 by-election	Francis Basset		George Brydges Rodney	
1768	Francis Basset		Hugh Pigot	Whig
1770 by-election	William Lemon		Hugh Pigot	Whig
1774	Sir George Osborn		William Chaytor	
1780	Sir Francis Basset		John Rogers	
1782 by-election	Sir Francis Basset		Reginald Pole-Carew	
1784	Sir Francis Basset		Sir John St Aubyn	
1790	Sir Francis Basset		Richard Glover	
1796	Thomas Wallace	Tory	William Meeke	
1802	Sir Stephen Lushington, Bt	Tory	Sir John Nicholl	Tory
1806	Henry Swann	Tory	Sir Christopher Hawkins	Tory
February 1807	Henry Swann	Tory	John Bettesworth-Trevanion	Tory
May 1807	Henry Swann	Tory	Charles Lemon	Whig
1812	Henry Swann	Tory	Philip Gell	Tory
1818	Henry Swann	Tory	Sir Christopher Hawkins	Tory
1819	vacant		Sir Christopher Hawkins	Tory
1820	Henry Swann	Tory	Pascoe Grenfell	Whig
1824 by-election	Robert Stanton	Tory	Pascoe Grenfell	Whig
1826	David Barclay	Whig	William Manning	Tory
1830	Sir Charles Lemon	Whig	James William Freshfield	Tory
1831	Charles Stewart	Tory	James William Freshfield	Tory
1832	Constituency abolished and renamed Penryn and Falmouth			
