= John Killigrew (died 1605) =

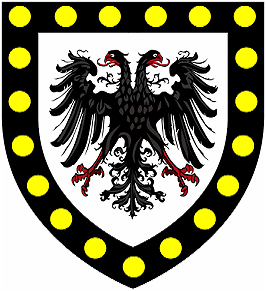
Arms of Killigrew: Argent, an eagle displayed with two heads sable a bordure of the second bezantée. The bezantée bordure indicates a connection to the ancient Earls of Cornwall

John Killigrew (c. 1557 – 1605) of Arwenack, near Falmouth in Cornwall, was three times MP for Penryn in 1584, 1586 and 1597, although he rarely attended Parliament. He was Vice-Admiral of Cornwall and like his father and grandfather was Governor of Pendennis Castle (1584–98), but was removed from office due to grave suspicions about his loyalty to the Crown. He was heavily in debt throughout his adult life, and died a ruined man.

== Life ==
Like both his parents, he had notorious dealings with local pirates, in particular with Captain Elliott, perhaps the most infamous Cornish buccaneer of his time. In 1587 he was accused of imprisoning the crew of a Danish ship which had put into Falmouth harbour, and seizing its cargo. He was threatened with arrest and with being outlawed, but escaped punishment, due to the influence of his uncle Sir Henry Killigrew, a noted diplomat who enjoyed the full confidence of Queen Elizabeth I. He was also accused of frustrating legal proceedings for piracy against his mother Mary Wolverston, whose reputation as a pirate was so notorious that she was briefly imprisoned on a charge of piracy in 1582.

During the war with Spain, his loyalty to the English Crown was questioned, although it is possible that he was guilty only of neglect of his official duties. There were rumours that a Cornish-born page at the Spanish Court, whose name was Killigrew, was his natural son, and acted as an intermediary between his father and the Spanish Government. The English Government, which by now had grave doubts about his loyalty, may have found these rumours all too credible. When the Spanish raided the Cornish coast in 1595, it was found that Killigrew had made no efforts to fortify Pendennis Castle (it was said there were "not two barrels of gunpowder in the castle"). This led to allegations that he had been bribed to leave the castle undefended, although the charge of bribery was never proved; again it seems that the influence of his uncle Henry was strong enough to protect him from punishment. He may also have benefited from his close family tie to Sir Francis Godolphin, probably the dominant political figure in Cornwall at the time, who had married his aunt Margaret Killigrew.

In 1598, after he had spent a decade defying authority, the Government finally lost patience, and after hearing him in his own defence, deprived him of the Governorship of Pendennis, which had been semi-hereditary in the Killigrew family for generations, and his office of Vice-Admiral of Cornwall.

Due to his father's debts and his own extravagance he died in poverty. His last years were a dreary journey in and out of a debtors' prison: he was preserved from utter ruin only by the remnant of his wife's fortune (and this eventually ran out) and the generosity of his uncle Sir Henry. To his eldest son John, he left a shattered inheritance.

== Origins ==
He was the eldest son and heir of Sir John IV Killigrew (died 1584) of Arwenack, Captain of Pendennis Castle, MP for Lostwithiel 1563 and for Penryn in 1571 and 1572, (elder brother of Henry Killigrew (c. 1528 – 1603), MP and diplomat and of William Killigrew (died 1622), MP and Chamberlain of the Exchequer) by his wife Mary Wolverston, daughter of Philip Wolverston of Wolverston Hall, Suffolk, and widow of Henry Knyvett.

== Marriage and children ==
He married Dorothy Monck, a daughter of Sir Thomas Monck (1570–1627) of Potheridge, Merton, Devon, MP for Camelford in 1626, and a sister of George Monck, 1st Duke of Albemarle (1608–1670). By his wife he had fourteen children, nine sons and five daughters, of whom ten survived infancy, including:

- Sir John Killigrew (1583-1633), of Arwenack, eldest son and heir, married Jane Fermor, daughter of Sir George Fermor of Easton Neston (whom he divorced after a lengthy and very costly legal battle) and died childless. He was described as "a good and sober man", but one who was. "unfortunate throughout his life". His former wife died in 1648.
- Sir Peter Killigrew (1593–1667), fourth son, MP for Camelford.
- Sir William Killigrew, 1st Baronet (died 1665), created a baronet at the Restoration of the Monarchy in 1660, which event was largely brought about by his uncle the Duke of Albemarle.
- Simon Killigrew (c.1596-1663).
- Thomas Killigrew (died c.1620).
- Maria Killigrew, who married Sir George Grenville.
- Odelia Killigrew, born 1599, still alive in 1633.
- Dorothy Killigrew, who married a Mr. Hooker.
- Elizabeth Killigrew, wife of Edmond Yeo (died 1636) of North Petherwin in Cornwall and Chittlehampton in Devon, son of Leonard Yeo (died 1624) of North Petherwin, a junior branch of the ancient Yeo family of Heanton Satchville, Petrockstowe in Devon.
- Walter and Grace, who died as infants.

== Character ==
He was described by an enemy as "a man who kept not within the compass of the law, as his father, from fear of punishment, now and then did". While it was not his fault that he had inherited such heavy debts from his father, his own extravagance and fondness for fine clothes and gambling drove his family close to ruin. Yet he cannot have lacked some good qualities, judging by the willingness of his friends and relatives, to the end of his life, to lend him money, stand surety for his debts, and plead on his behalf with the Crown. His uncle Sir Henry Killigrew, who might have been expected to distance himself from John to safeguard his own diplomatic career, showed his nephew great generosity and loyalty throughout his life.

== In fiction ==
John Killigrew is one of the central characters in the historical novel The Grove of Eagles by Winston Graham. The narrator, his illegitimate son Maugan, gratefully acknowledges the kindness shown to him by his father, who raises him as one of the family: yet in the end he judges his father harshly as a weak, foolish, self-indulgent man who brought his family to ruin. He remembers his stepmother Dorothy with great affection and pity: by contrast, he believes that his father's wretched later life, as he went in and out of a debtors' prison, was no worse a fate than he deserved.
