= Roscarrock =

Ros(s)carrock may refer to:

- Rosscarrock, Calgary
- Roscarrock, St Endellion, seat of the Roscarrock family
- Francis Roscarrock, English politician
- Nicholas Roscarrock (1549?–1634?), English Catholic activist and hagiographer
- Thomas Roscarrock, MP for Liskeard (UK Parliament constituency)
- Richard Roscarrock, MP for Cornwall (UK Parliament constituency)
