= Samuel Trelawny =

English lawyer and politician

Samuel Trelawny (1630 – 1666) was an English lawyer and politician who sat in the House of Commons at various times between 1659 and 1666.

Trelawny was the eldest surviving son of Robert Trelawny and was baptised on 31 March 1630. His father was a merchant of Ham and MP for Plymouth. Trelawny matriculated at Exeter College, Oxford in 1647 and entered Gray's Inn in 1647.

In 1659, Trelawny was elected Member of Parliament for Bossiney for the Third Protectorate Parliament. In 1660 he was elected MP in double returns for both Camelford and for Plymouth and sat for Plymouth in the Convention Parliament. He became commissioner for assessment for Devon in August 1660. He was called to the bar in 1661 and became a commissioner for assessment for Cornwall. He also became J.P. for Devon and Cornwall. He was re-elected MP for Plymouth for the Cavalier Parliament in 1661 and sat until his death in 1666.

Trelawny died at Hengar and was buried at St Tudy on 26 April 1666.

Trelawny married Elizabeth Billing, daughter of John Billing of Hengar on 5 February 1651. He was the brother of John Trelawny.

Parliament of England
Preceded by Not represented in Second Protectorate Parliament	Member of Parliament for Bossiney; 1659; With: Thomas Povey	Succeeded by Not represented in Restored Rump
Preceded by William Say	Member of Parliament for Camelford; 1660; With: Peter Killigrew	Succeeded by Thomas Vivian; William Cotton
Preceded by John Maynard; Edmund Powell	Member of Parliament for Plymouth; 1660–1666; With: Sir William Morice	Succeeded by Sir William Morice; Sir Gilbert Talbot
