= Mark Milbank (MP) =

English politician

Mark Milbank JP DL

Member of Parliament for Camelford
- In office 1820–1832 Serving with The Earl of Yarmouth; Sheldon Cradock
- Preceded by: Camelford's representation suspended 1819-1820
- Succeeded by: Constituency abolished
- In office 1818–1819 Serving with John Bushby Maitland
- Preceded by: William Leader; Samuel Scott
- Succeeded by: John Stewart; Lewis Allsopp

Personal details
- Born: 2 May 1795 Well, North Yorkshire
- Died: 21 October 1881 (aged 86)
- Spouse: Lady Augusta Henrietta Vane (m. 1817; died 1874)
- Children: 7, including Frederick
- Parent(s): William Milbank; Dorothy Wise
- Education: Harrow School
- Alma mater: Oriel College, Oxford

Mark Milbank JP DL (2 May 1795 – 21 October 1881) was an English landowner and Whig politician.

== Early life ==
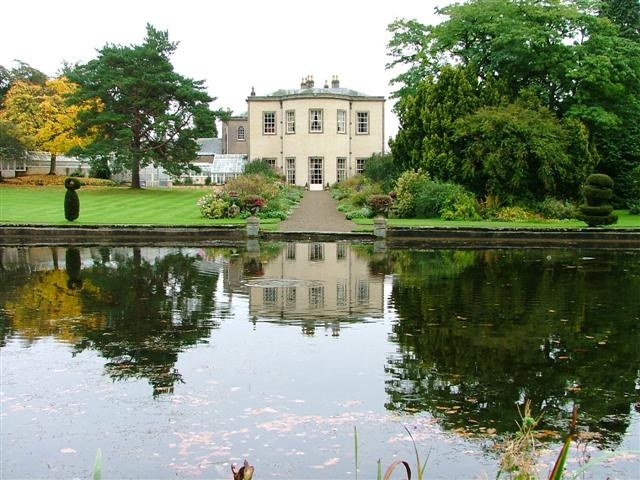
The Milbank seat, Thorp Perrow Hall.

Milbank was born on 2 May 1795 and baptised at Well, North Yorkshire. He was the eldest son of William Milbank and Dorothy (née Wise) Milbank. His father bought Thorp Perrow Hall, Snape Castle, and Snape village in 1798.

His father was born illegitimately and named William Melville at birth but had his name legally changed to William Milbank by Royal Warrant in 1792 in order for him inherit the estates of his father, Mark Milbank. His maternal grandfather was John Wise of Woolston, Devon.

He was educated at Harrow School from 1805 to 1813 before matriculating at Oriel College, Oxford in 1813.

== Career ==
He succeeded to his father's estates in North Yorkshire in 1802, including Barningham Park, which had been home to the Milbank family since 1690. He was elected to Brooks's in February 1818. His wife, Lady Augusta, created the pinetum on the family estate.

Milbank was returned for the borough of Camelford in 1818 on his father-in-law Lord Darlington's interest, but was unseated on petition. Two years later in 1820, however, he was returned unopposed. At the general election in summer 1822, Milbank and Sheldon Cradock, another nominee of his father-in-law, were returned for Camelford ahead of two candidates of The Earl of Yarmouth (who had to leave the House upon becoming the 3rd Marquess of Hertford).

Milbank was a captain in the 4th North Riding Militia in 1814, a Lieutenant with the West Riding Yeomanry in June 1819, Captain in December 1819, before resigning in April 1820. He served as High Sheriff of Yorkshire from 1837 to 1838, as well as Justice of the Peace and Deputy Lieutenant of Yorkshire.

== Personal life ==
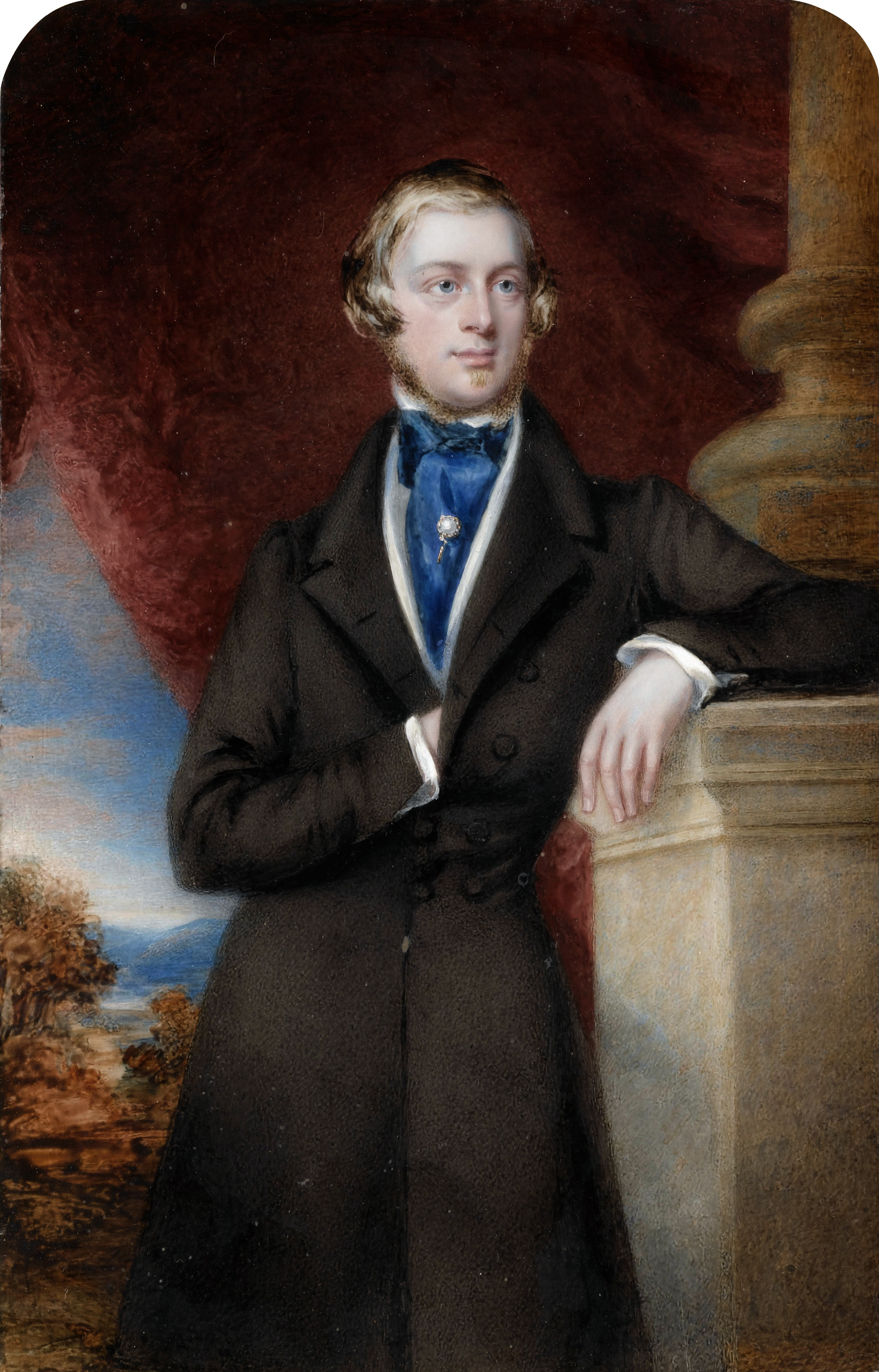
Portrait of his second son, Frederick, by Maria Mosely, 1846

On 2 June 1817, Milbank was married to Lady Augusta Henrietta Vane (1796–1874) at St James's, Westminster. Lady Augusta was a daughter of William Vane, 1st Duke of Cleveland and Lady Catherine Powlett (a daughter of the 6th Duke of Bolton). Together, they were the parents of four sons and three daughters, including:

- Mark William Vane Milbank (1819–1883), who married Barbarina Sophia Farquhar, daughter of Sir Thomas Farquhar, 2nd Baronet.
- Frederick Acclom Milbank (1820–1898), a Liberal MP for North Riding of Yorkshire and Richmond who was created a baronet in 1882; he married Alexina Harriet Elizabeth Don, daughter of Sir Alexander Don, 6th Baronet, in 1844.
- Augusta Caroline Milbank (1821–1889), who married Henry Foster Coore in 1841.
- Henry John Milbank (1824–1872), who married Lady Margaret Grey, daughter of George Grey, 8th Baron Grey of Groby and Lady Katherine Charteris (a daughter of the 8th Earl of Wemyss), in 1846. After her death in 1852, he married Lady Susan Osborne, daughter of George Osborne, 8th Duke of Leeds and Harriet Stewart (an illegitimate daughter of the 1st Earl Granville), in 1864.

Lady Augusta died in 1874. Milbank died on 21 October 1881. Upon his death, his estates passed in turn to his sons Mark and Frederick.

Honorary titles
| Previous: Nicholas Edmund Yarburgh | High Sheriff of Yorkshire; 1837–1838 | Succeeded by Sir Robert Frankland-Russell, Bt |
Parliament of the United Kingdom
| Preceded by William Leader; Samuel Scott | Member of Parliament for Camelford; 1818–1819; With: John Bushby Maitland | Succeeded by John Stewart; Lewis Allsopp |
| Vacant Constituency suspended | Member of Parliament for Camelford; 1820–1832; With: The Earl of Yarmouth; Sheldon Cradock | Constituency abolished |
