= Alienation Office =

Former British government body

Agency overview
- Formed: 1576
- Dissolved: 1835 (Note: All of the office's functions had been abolished in 1834.)
- Jurisdiction: England and Wales
- Agency executives: Arthur Atys, Receiver-General (first known); Charles Dodd, Receiver-General (last)

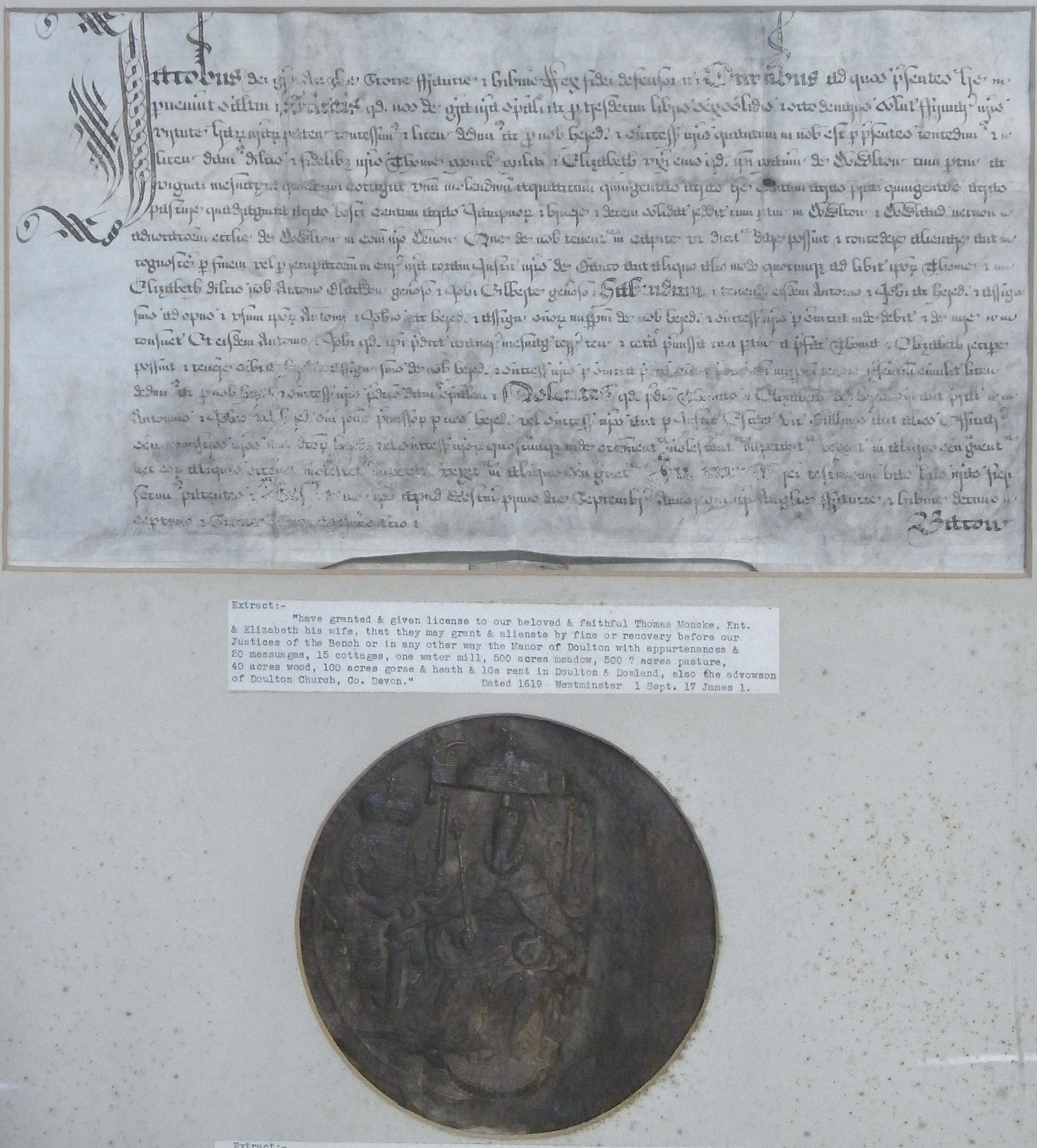
Royal licence to alienate the manor of Dolton granted in 1619 by King James I to Sir Thomas Monck (d.1627) of Potheridge, Devon. Great Seal of King James I appended

The Alienation Office was a British Government body charged with regulating the 'alienation' or transfer of certain feudal lands in England by use of a licence to alienate granted by the king, during the feudal era, and by the government thereafter.

== Establishment ==
The first regulatory structure for controlling the alienation of feudal lands was created during the reign of Henry III (1216–1272), who issued an ordinance prohibiting his tenants-in-chief from alienating their lands held from him without his specific licence.

== Rationale ==
During the feudal era the king was the only true "owner" of land under his allodial title, and the rest of the population merely "held" estates in land from him under various forms of feudal tenure, directly in the case of his tenants-in-chief, and indirectly in the case of sub-tenants of the latter. The king's tenants-in-chief formed the backbone of the royal army. King William the Conqueror had granted all the land he conquered in England to his principal military commanders, and others to the church and to other of his supporters and servants. These were the first tenants-in-chief of the Anglo-Norman feudal system. The principal was that an estate (or fee) would supply the needs of one knight so that he would be able to appear fully armed, mounted and attended by esquires and retinue, for royal military service for a certain number of days per year. The king wanted to ensure that any new occupant of the fee would be an effective soldier, thus a licence to alienate was effectively a royal veto on a new tenant-in-chief.

== Penalties for non-compliance ==
Originally the penalty for not obtaining a royal licence was forfeiture of the lands concerned. The next major change occurred in 1327, when the penalty for non-compliance was changed from forfeiture to a fine, payable into the Hanaper of the Chancery. As with many English legal and regulatory systems a gradual evolution occurred to deliver a settled system. The penalty for alienating land without a royal licence became one year's revenue from that land, and the payment required to obtain a licence to alienate was one third of the value of the land to be alienated.

== Alienation Office ==
In 1576 the Alienation Office was first established on a proper basis. Robert Dudley, 1st Earl of Leicester was granted a 10-year farm of the revenues due under the alienation of property licensing regime. The farm also covered monies payable from 'pre-fines' payable during the applicant's hearing in the Court of Final Pleas. The Office developed from the structures created by Dudley during this period. Ten years later an extension of the farm was granted to Thomas Dudley and Robert Wrotte, acting as agents for Robert Dudley. Dudley died in 1588, but the regime he created continued in place, and in 1595 was further extended to cover fines imposed for writs of entry in the process of common recovery.

The office was established in premises on today's site of King's Bench Walk, Temple, London, which now house legal chambers.

During the period of the Commonwealth (1649–1660) there was a brief gap in the office's existence. It was abolished in September 1653, but was resurrected a year later once the full extent of loss in revenue to the state had been fully appreciated. More drastic change occurred in 1661, shortly after feudal tenures were abolished by the Tenures Abolition Act 1660. The concept of tenancy-in-chief was removed from English law, and regulations restricting the free conveyance of land were removed. The Alienation Office however continued in existence for nearly another 200 years. Following the Glorious Revolution of 1688 and the ascension of the throne by William III and Mary II, a new form of control over the Alienation Office was created when in May 1689 the Commissioners of the Treasury started to exercise control over the Office by use of letters patent created under the Privy Seal.

In 1758 a small extension of the jurisdiction of the Office took place when post fines were dealt with directly by the Office, which both assessed and collected them. However sheriffs still continued to remit to the Exchequer a sum of equal value to the post fines due from their county, formerly collected by them. The 18th. century closed with an extensive inquiry by a House of Commons select committee into the workings and financing of the Office.

The pace of reform in the United Kingdom gathered pace in the 1830s, and the structure of the Alienation Office did not survive that decade. In 1834 land conveyancing was reformed and the system of fines and recoveries was abolished, which left the Alienation Office with no substantial function. It was consequently abolished in 1835.

== List of Receivers General ==
Receiver-General of Alienation Office
- Royal Arms of the United Kingdom (from 1816)
- Appointer: Monarch of England (1603–1707) Monarch of Great Britain (1707-1801) Monarch of the United Kingdom (1801–1832)
- Term length: At the Monarch's pleasure
- Formation: 1603
- First holder: Sir Arthur Atys
- Final holder: Charles Dodd
- Abolished: 1832

The following persons held the office of Receiver General of the Alienation Office between 1602 and 1832:

- Sir Arthur Atys c. 1603–1604
- Sir John Suckling 1604–1620?
- Henry Tweedy 1620?–1623?
- Thomas Bond c. 1639–1640
- Thomas Fauconbridge c. 1643–44
- Edward Nicholas 1660–1691
- Edward Nicholas (the younger) 1691–1699
- Hon. Charles Boyle, later Earl of Orrery 1699–1717
- William Jessop 1717–1734
- Sir William Ashburnham 1735–1755
- Thomas Steele 1755–1755
- Elfred Staples 1755–1761
- Thomas Steele 1761–1763
- Stephen Digby 1763–1765
- Thomas Steele 1767–1775
- John St John 1775–1793
- Thomas Steele 1793–1797
- George Canning 1797–1827
- Charles Dodd 1827–1832

== Sources ==
- Records of the Alienation Office, reference A, Catalogue of the National Archives of the United Kingdom, Kew
