= Robert Dudley, 1st Earl of Leicester =

English statesman and royal favourite (1532–1588)

The Right Honourable Robert Dudley KG PC
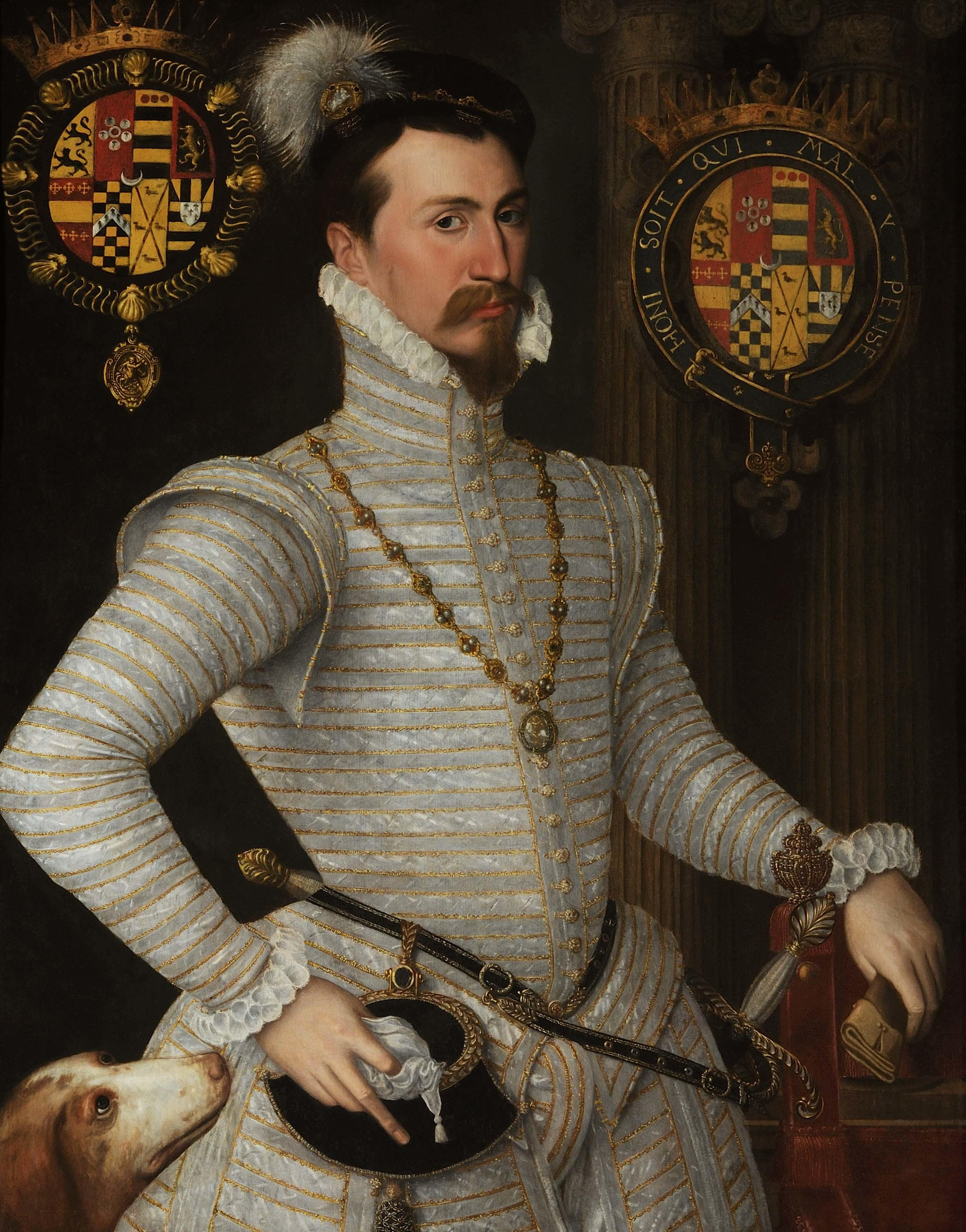
- c. 1564 portrait
- Tenure: 1564–1588
- Other titles: Lord of Denbigh
- Known for: Favourite of Elizabeth I
- Born: Robert Dudley; 24 June 1532
- Died: 4 September 1588 (aged 56); Cornbury, Oxfordshire, England
- Buried: Collegiate Church of St Mary, Warwick
- Residence: Kenilworth Castle, Warwickshire; Leicester House, London; Wanstead, Essex
- Locality: West Midlands; North Wales
- Wars and battles: Kett's Rebellion; campaign against Mary I, 1553; Battle of St. Quentin, 1557; Dutch Revolt; Spanish Armada
- Offices: Master of the Horse; Lord Steward of the Royal Household; Privy Councillor; governor-general of the United Provinces
- Spouses: Amy Robsart (m. 1550; died 1560); Lettice Knollys (m. 1578)
- Issue: Sir Robert Dudley (illegitimate); Robert Dudley, Lord of Denbigh
- Parents: John Dudley, 1st Duke of Northumberland; Jane Guildford

Robert Dudley, 1st Earl of Leicester (24 June 1532 (Note: There is a popular tradition that Robert Dudley was the same age as Elizabeth I; however, in a letter to William Cecil he denotes 24 June as his birthday, and a 1576 portrait miniature by Nicholas Hilliard gives his age as 44, "so 1532 is the most likely year of his birth" (Adams 2008b).) – 4 September 1588) was an English statesman and the favourite of Elizabeth I from her accession until his death. He was a suitor for the queen's hand for many years.

Dudley's youth was overshadowed by the downfall of his family in 1553 after his father, the Duke of Northumberland, had failed to prevent the accession of Mary I. Robert Dudley was condemned to death but was released in 1554 and took part in the Battle of St. Quentin under Mary's husband and co-ruler, Philip, which led to his full rehabilitation, but also to the death of his older brother Henry. On Elizabeth I's accession in November 1558, Dudley was appointed Master of the Horse. In October 1562, he became a privy councillor and, in 1587, was appointed Lord Steward of the Royal Household. In 1564, Dudley became Earl of Leicester and, from 1563, one of the greatest landowners in North Wales and the English West Midlands by royal grants.

The Earl of Leicester was one of Elizabeth's leading statesmen, involved in domestic as well as foreign politics alongside William Cecil and Sir Francis Walsingham. Although he refused to be married to Mary, Queen of Scots, Leicester was for a long time relatively sympathetic to her until, from the mid-1580s, he urged her execution. As patron of the Puritan movement, he supported non-conforming preachers but tried to mediate between them and the bishops of the Church of England. A champion also of the international Protestant cause, he led the English campaign in support of the Dutch Revolt (1585–1587). His acceptance of the post of governor-general of the United Provinces infuriated Queen Elizabeth. The expedition was a military and political failure, and it ruined Leicester financially. Leicester was engaged in many large-scale business ventures and was one of the main backers of Francis Drake and other explorers and privateers. During the Spanish Armada, Leicester was in overall command of the English land forces. In this function, he invited Queen Elizabeth to visit her troops at Tilbury. This was the last of many events he had organised over the years, the most spectacular being the festival at his seat Kenilworth Castle in 1575 on the occasion of a three-week visit by the Queen. Leicester was a principal patron of the arts, literature, and the Elizabethan theatre.

Leicester's private life interfered with his court career and vice versa. When his first wife, Amy Robsart, fell down a flight of stairs and died in 1560, he was free to marry the queen. However, the resulting scandal very much reduced his chances in this respect. Popular rumours that he had arranged for his wife's death continued throughout his life, despite the coroner's jury's verdict of accident. For 18 years he did not remarry for Queen Elizabeth's sake and when he finally did, his new wife, Lettice Knollys, was permanently banished from court. This and the death of his only legitimate son and heir were heavy blows. Shortly after the child's death in 1584, a virulent libel known as Leicester's Commonwealth was circulated in England. It laid the foundation of a literary and historiographical tradition that often depicted Leicester as the Machiavellian "master courtier" and as a deplorable figure around Elizabeth I. More recent research has led to a reassessment of his place in Elizabethan government and society.

== Early life ==
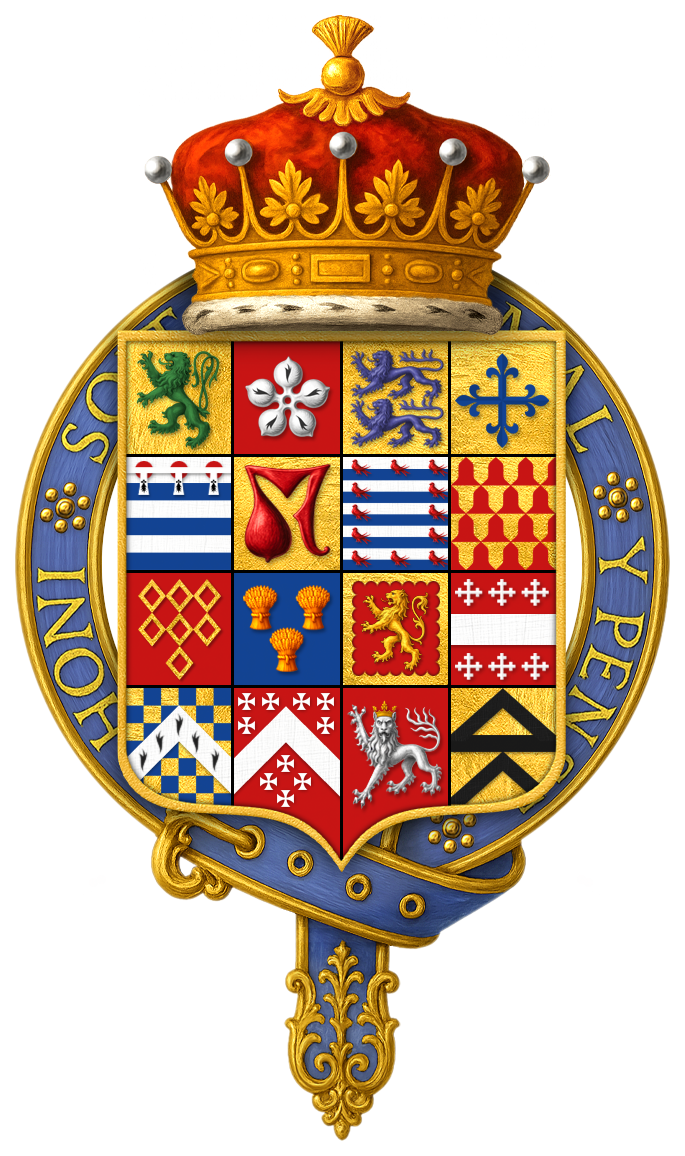
Quartered arms of Robert Dudley, Earl of Leicester (based on his Order of the Garter stallplate in St. George's Chapel)

=== Education and marriage ===
Robert Dudley was the fifth son of John Dudley, 1st Duke of Northumberland, and his wife Jane, daughter of Sir Edward Guildford. His paternal grandfather, Edmund Dudley, had been an adviser to King Henry VII and was executed for treason in 1510 by King Henry VIII. John and Jane Dudley had 13 children in all and were known for their happy family life. Among the siblings' tutors figured John Dee, Thomas Wilson, and Roger Ascham.

Roger Ascham believed that Robert Dudley possessed a rare talent for languages and writing, including in Latin, regretting that his pupil had done himself harm by preferring mathematics. Robert learned the craft of the courtier at the courts of Henry VIII, and especially Edward VI, among whose companions he served.

In 1549, Robert Dudley participated in crushing Kett's Rebellion and probably first met Amy Robsart, whom he was to wed on 4 June 1550 in the presence of the young King Edward. She was of the same age as the bridegroom and the daughter and heiress of Sir John Robsart, a gentleman-farmer of Norfolk. It was a love-match, the young couple depending heavily on their fathers' gifts, especially Robert's. John Dudley, who since early 1550 effectively ruled England, was pleased to strengthen his influence in Norfolk by his son's marriage. Lord Robert, as he was styled as a duke's son, became an important local gentleman and served as a Member of Parliament for Norfolk in 1551–52, March 1553 and 1559. His court career went on in parallel.

=== Condemned and pardoned ===
On 6 July 1553, King Edward VI died and the Duke of Northumberland attempted to transfer the English crown to Lady Jane Grey, who was married to his second youngest son, Lord Guildford Dudley. Robert Dudley led a force of 300 into Norfolk where Edward's half-sister Mary was assembling her followers. After some ten days in the county and securing several towns for Jane, he took King's Lynn and proclaimed her in the marketplace. The next day, 19 July, Jane's reign was over in London. Soon, the townsmen of King's Lynn seized Robert Dudley and the rest of his small troop and sent him to Framlingham Castle before Mary I.

Robert Dudley was imprisoned in the Tower of London, attainted, and condemned to death, as were his father and four brothers. His father went to the scaffold. In the Tower, Dudley's stay coincided with the imprisonment of his childhood friend, Edward and Mary's half-sister Elizabeth, who was sent there on suspicion of involvement in Wyatt's rebellion. Guildford Dudley was executed in February 1554. The surviving brothers were released in the autumn; working for their release, their mother (who died in January 1555) and their brother-in-law, Henry Sidney, had befriended the incoming Spanish nobles around Philip of Spain, Mary's husband.

In December 1554, Ambrose and Robert Dudley took part in a tournament held to celebrate Anglo-Spanish friendship. Yet, the Dudley brothers were welcome at court only as long as King Philip was there, otherwise they were suspected of associating with people who conspired against Mary's regime. In January 1557, Robert and Amy Dudley were allowed to repossess some of their former lands, and in March of the same year Dudley was at Calais where he was chosen to deliver personally to Queen Mary the happy news of Philip's return to England. Ambrose, Robert, and Henry Dudley, the youngest brother, fought for Philip II at the Battle of St. Quentin in August 1557. Henry Dudley was killed in the following siege by a cannonball—according to Robert, before his own eyes. All surviving Dudley children — Ambrose and Robert with their sisters, Mary and Katherine — were restored in blood by Mary I's next parliament in 1558.

== Royal favourite ==
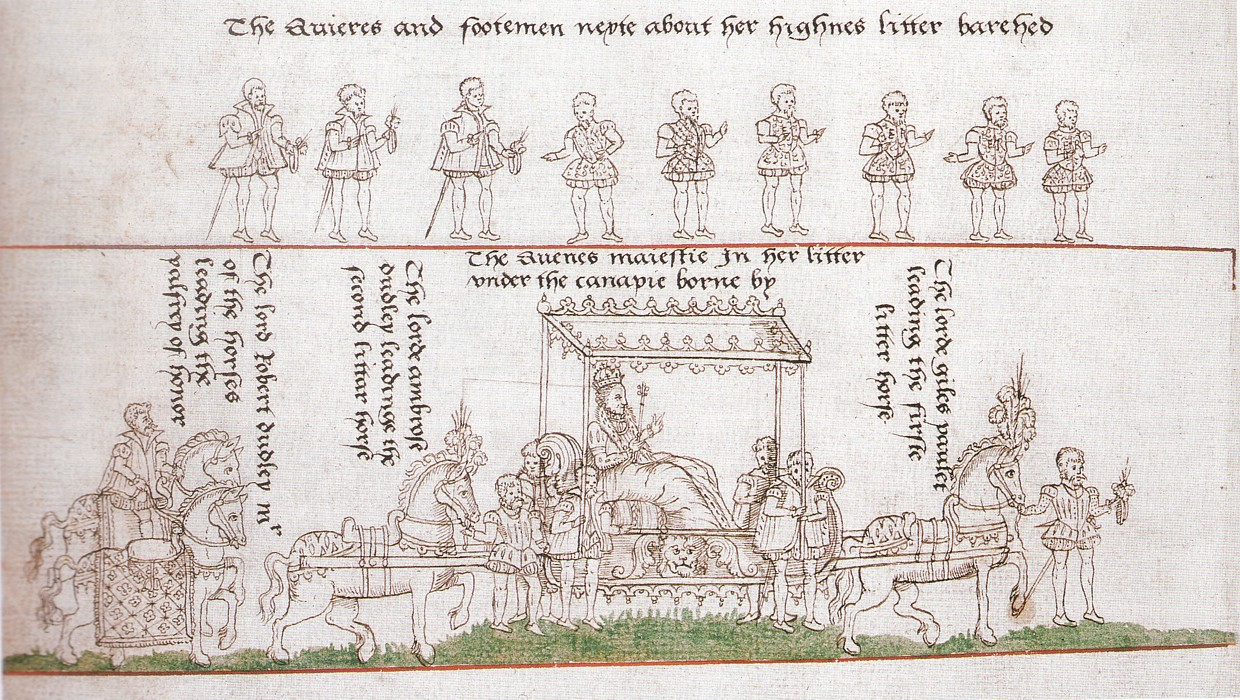
Elizabeth's coronation procession: Dudley is on horseback on the far left, leading the palfrey of honour.

Robert Dudley was counted among Elizabeth's special friends by Philip II's envoy to the English court a week before Queen Mary's death. On 18 November 1558, the morning after Elizabeth's accession, Dudley witnessed the surrender of the Great Seal to her at Hatfield. He became Master of the Horse on the same day. This was an important court position entailing close attendance on the sovereign. It suited him, as he was an excellent horseman and showed great professional interest in royal transport and accommodation, horse breeding, and the supply of horses for all occasions. Dudley was also entrusted with organising and overseeing a large part of the Queen's coronation festivities.

In April 1559 Dudley was elected a Knight of the Garter. Shortly before, Philip II had been informed:

Lord Robert has come so much into favour that he does whatever he likes with affairs and it is even said that her majesty visits him in his chamber day and night. People talk of this so freely that they go so far as to say that his wife has a malady in one of her breasts (Note: "está muy mala de un pecho" ("she is very ill in one breast"), in the original Spanish (Adams 1995 p. 63).) and the Queen is only waiting for her to die to marry Lord Robert ... Matters have reached such a pass ... that ... it would ... be well to approach Lord Robert on your Majesty's behalf ... Your Majesty would do well to attract and confirm him in his friendship.

Within a month the Spanish ambassador, Count de Feria, counted Robert Dudley among three persons who ran the country. (Note: The others he listed were William Cecil and his brother-in-law Nicholas Bacon (Chamberlin 1939 p. 101).) Visiting foreigners of princely rank were bidding for his goodwill. He acted as an official host on state occasions and was himself a frequent guest at ambassadorial dinners. By the autumn of 1559 several foreign princes were vying for the Queen's hand; their impatient envoys came under the impression that Elizabeth was fooling them, "keeping Lord Robert's enemies and the country engaged with words until this wicked deed of killing his wife is consummated." "Lord Robert", the new Spanish ambassador de Quadra was convinced, was the man "in whom it is easy to recognise the king that is to be ... she will marry none but the favoured Robert." Many of the nobility would not brook Dudley's new prominence, as they could not "put up with his being King." Plans to kill the favourite abounded, and Dudley took to wearing a light coat of mail under his clothes. Among all classes, in England and abroad, gossip got underway that the Queen had children by Dudley—such rumours never quite ended for the rest of her life.

=== Amy Dudley's death ===
Already in April 1559 court observers noted that Elizabeth never let Dudley from her side; but her favour did not extend to his wife. Amy Dudley lived in different parts of the country since her ancestral manor house was uninhabitable. Her husband visited her for four days at Easter 1559 and she spent a month around London in the early summer of the same year. They never saw each other again; Dudley was with the Queen at Windsor Castle and possibly planning a visit to her, when his wife was found dead at her residence Cumnor Place near Oxford on 8 September 1560:

There came to me Bowes, by whom I do understand that my wife is dead and as he sayeth by a fall from a pair of stairs. Little other understanding can I have of him. The greatness and the suddenness of the misfortune doth so perplex me, until I do hear from you how the matter standeth, or how this evil should light upon me, considering what the malicious world will bruit, as I can take no rest.

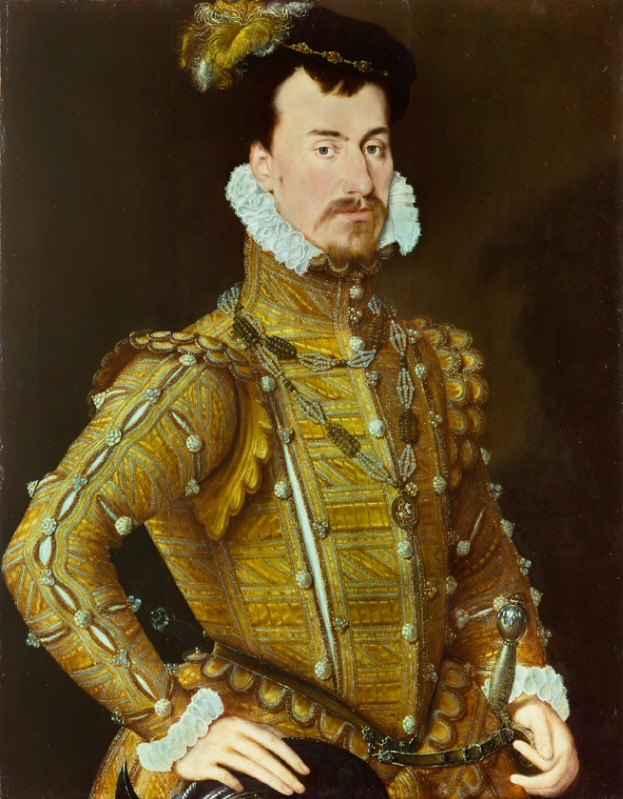
Dudley c. 1560

Retiring to his house at Kew, away from court as from the putative crime scene, he pressed for an impartial inquiry, which had already begun in the form of an inquest. The jury found that it was an accident: Lady Dudley, staying alone "in a certain chamber", had fallen down the adjoining stairs, sustaining two head injuries and breaking her neck. It was widely suspected that Dudley had arranged his wife's death to be able to marry the Queen. The scandal played into the hands of nobles and politicians who desperately tried to prevent Elizabeth from marrying him. Most historians have considered murder to be unlikely. The coroner's report came to light in The National Archives in 2008 and is compatible with an accidental fall as well as suicide or other violence. In the absence of the forensic findings of 1560, it was often assumed that a simple accident could not be the explanation—on the basis of near-contemporary tales that Amy Dudley was found at the bottom of a short flight of stairs with a broken neck, her headdress still standing undisturbed "upon her head", a detail that first appeared as a satirical remark in the libel Leicester's Commonwealth of 1584 and has ever since been repeated for a fact. To account for such oddities and evidence that she was ill, it was suggested in 1956 by Ian Aird, a professor of surgery, that Amy Dudley had suffered from breast cancer, which through metastatic cancerous deposits in the spine, could have caused her neck to break under only limited strain, such as a short fall or even just coming down the stairs. This explanation has been widely accepted. Suicide has also often been considered an option, motives being Amy Dudley's depression or mortal illness.

=== Marriage hopes and proposals ===
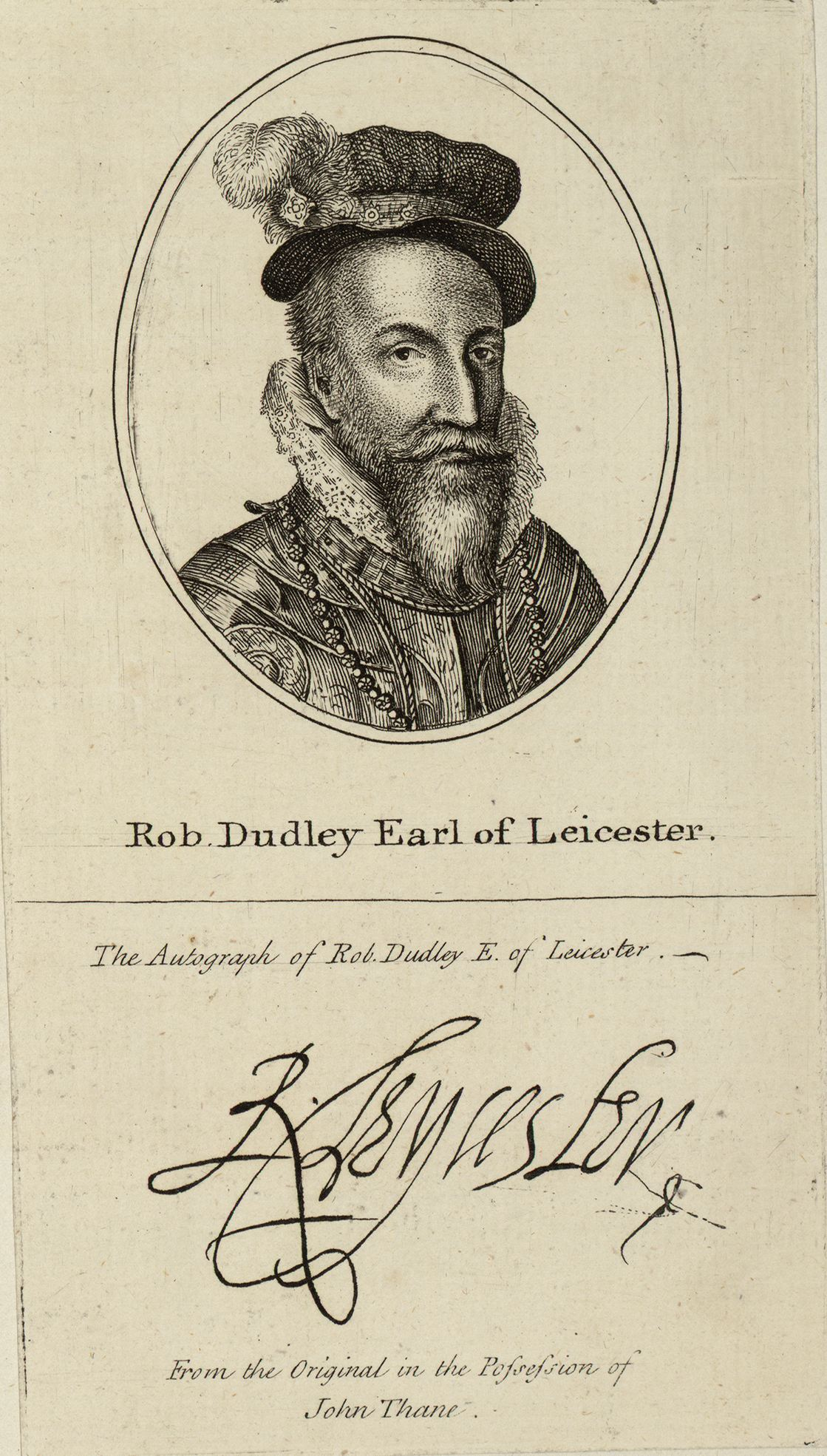
Lord Leicester. An 18th-century copy of his portrait and autograph

Elizabeth remained close to Dudley and he, with her blessing and on her prompting, pursued his suit for her hand in an atmosphere of diplomatic intrigue. His wife's and his father's shadows haunted his prospects. His efforts leading nowhere, in the spring of 1561 Dudley offered to leave England to seek military adventures abroad; Elizabeth would have none of that and everything remained as it was. In 1587, a man named Arthur claimed to have been born in 1561 as the illegitimate son of Robert Dudley and Queen Elizabeth I, but his claims could not be proven.

In October 1562, the Queen fell ill with smallpox and, believing her life to be in danger, she asked the Privy Council to make Robert Dudley Protector of the Realm and to give him a suitable title together with 20,000 pounds a year. There was universal relief when she recovered her health. Dudley was made a privy councillor. He was already deeply involved in foreign politics, including Scotland.

In 1563, Elizabeth suggested Dudley as a consort to the widowed Mary, Queen of Scots, the idea being to achieve firm amity between England and Scotland and diminish the influence of foreign powers. Elizabeth's preferred solution was that they should all live together at the English court, so that she would not have to forgo her favourite's company. Mary at first enquired if Elizabeth was serious, wanting above all to know her chances of inheriting the English crown. Elizabeth repeatedly declared that she was prepared to acknowledge Mary as her heir only on condition that she marry Robert Dudley. Mary's Protestant advisors warmed to the prospect of her marriage to Dudley, and in September 1564 he was created Earl of Leicester, a move designed to make him more acceptable to Mary. In January 1565, Thomas Randolph, the English ambassador to Scotland, was told by the Scottish queen that she would accept the proposal. To his amazement, Dudley was not to be moved to comply:

But a man of that nature I never found any ... he whom I go about to make as happy as ever was any, to put him in possession of a kingdom, to lay in his naked arms a most fair ... lady ... nothing regardeth the good that shall ensue unto him thereby ... but so uncertainly dealeth that I know not where to find him.

Dudley indeed had made it clear to the Scots at the beginning that he was not a candidate for Mary's hand and forthwith had behaved with passive resistance. He also worked in the interest of Henry Stuart, Lord Darnley, Mary's eventual choice of husband. Elizabeth herself wavered as to declaring Mary her heir, until in March 1565 she decided she could not bring herself to it. Still, she finally told the Spanish ambassador that the proposal fell through because the Earl of Leicester refused to cooperate.

By 1564, Dudley had realised that his chances of becoming Elizabeth's consort were small. At the same time he could not "consider ... without great repugnance", as he said, that she chose another husband. Confronted with other marriage projects, Elizabeth continued to say that she still would very much like to marry him. Dudley was seen as a serious candidate until the mid-1560s and later. To remove this threat to Habsburg and Valois suitors, between 1565 and 1578, four German and French princesses were mooted as brides for Leicester, as a consolation for giving up Elizabeth and his resistance to her foreign marriage projects. These he had sabotaged and would continue to sabotage. In 1566 Dudley formed the opinion that Elizabeth would never marry, recalling that she had always said so since she was eight years old; but he still was hopeful—she had also assured him he would be her choice in case she changed her mind (and married an Englishman).

=== Life at court ===
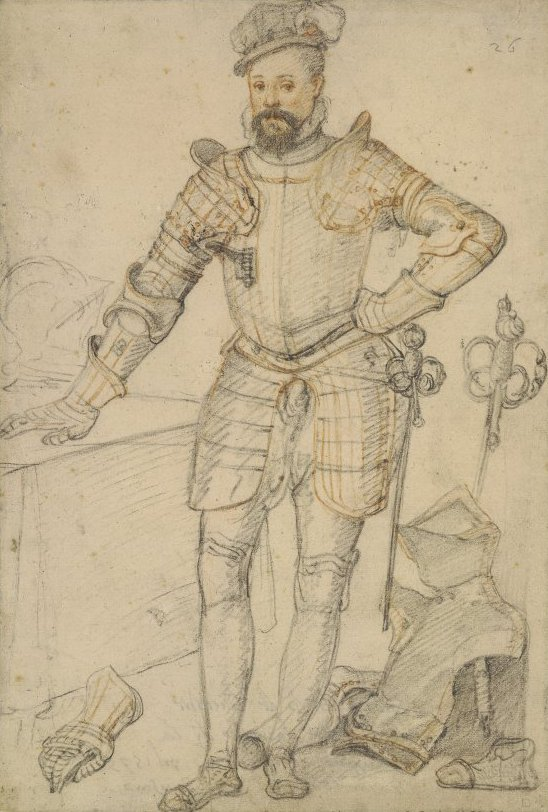
Robert Dudley, dressed partly in tilting armour, 1575

As "a male favourite to a virgin queen", Robert Dudley found himself in an unprecedented situation. His apartments at court were next to hers, and—perceived as knowing "the Queen and her nature best of any man"—his influence was matched by few. Another side of such privileges was Elizabeth's possessiveness and jealousy. His company was essential for her well-being and for many years he was hardly allowed to leave. Sir Christopher Hatton reported a growing emergency when the Earl was away for a few weeks in 1578: "This court wanteth your presence. Her majesty is unaccompanied and, I assure you, the chambers are almost empty."

On ceremonial occasions, Dudley often acted as an unofficial consort, sometimes in the Queen's stead. He largely assumed charge of court ceremonial and organised hundreds of small and large festivities. From 1587 he was Lord Steward, being responsible for the royal household's supply with food and other commodities. He displayed a strong sense for economising and reform in this function, which he had de facto occupied long before his official appointment. The sanitary situation in the palaces was a perennial problem, and a talk with Leicester about these issues inspired John Harington to construct a water closet. Leicester was a lifelong sportsman, hunting and jousting in the tiltyard, and an indefatigable tennis-player. He was also the Queen's regular dancing partner.

== Ancestral and territorial ambition ==
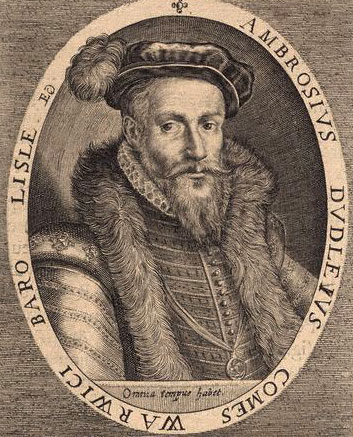
Ambrose Dudley, 3rd Earl of Warwick, Robert Dudley's elder brother

After the Duke of Northumberland's attainder the entire Dudley inheritance had disappeared. His sons had to start from scratch in rebuilding the family fortunes, as they had renounced any rights to their father's former possessions or titles when their own attainders had been lifted in January 1558. Robert Dudley financed the lifestyle expected of a royal favourite by large loans from City of London merchants until in April 1560 Elizabeth granted him his first export licence, worth £6,000 p.a. He also received some of his father's lands, but since he was not the family heir it was a matter of some difficulty to find a suitable estate for his intended peerage. In June 1563 the Queen granted him Kenilworth Manor, Castle, and Park, together with the lordships of Denbigh and Chirk in North Wales. Other grants were to follow. Eventually, Leicester and his elder brother Ambrose Dudley, 3rd Earl of Warwick, came to preside over the greatest aristocratic interest in the West Midlands and North Wales.

=== Denbighshire ===
At the time Robert Dudley entered his new Welsh possessions there had existed a tenurial chaos for more than half a century. Some leading local families benefited from this to the detriment of the Crown's revenue. To remedy this situation, and to increase his own income, Dudley affected compositions with the tenants in what Simon Adams has called an "ambitious resolution of a long-standing problem ... without parallel in Elizabeth's reign". All tenants that had so far only been copyholders were raised to the status of freeholders in exchange for newly agreed rents. Likewise, all tenants' rights of common were secured as were the boundaries of the commons, thus striking a balance between property rights and protection against enclosure.

Though an absentee landlord, Leicester, who was also Lord of Denbigh, regarded the lordship as an integral part of a territorial base for a revived House of Dudley. He set about developing the town of Denbigh with large building projects; the church he planned, though, was never finished, being too ambitious. It would have been not only the largest, but also the first post-Reformation church in England and Wales built according to a plan where the preacher was to take the centre instead of the altar, thus stressing the importance of preaching in the Protestant Church. In vain Leicester tried to have the nearby episcopal see of St Asaph transferred to Denbigh. He also encouraged and supported the translation of the Bible and the Common Prayer Book into Welsh.

=== Warwick and Kenilworth ===
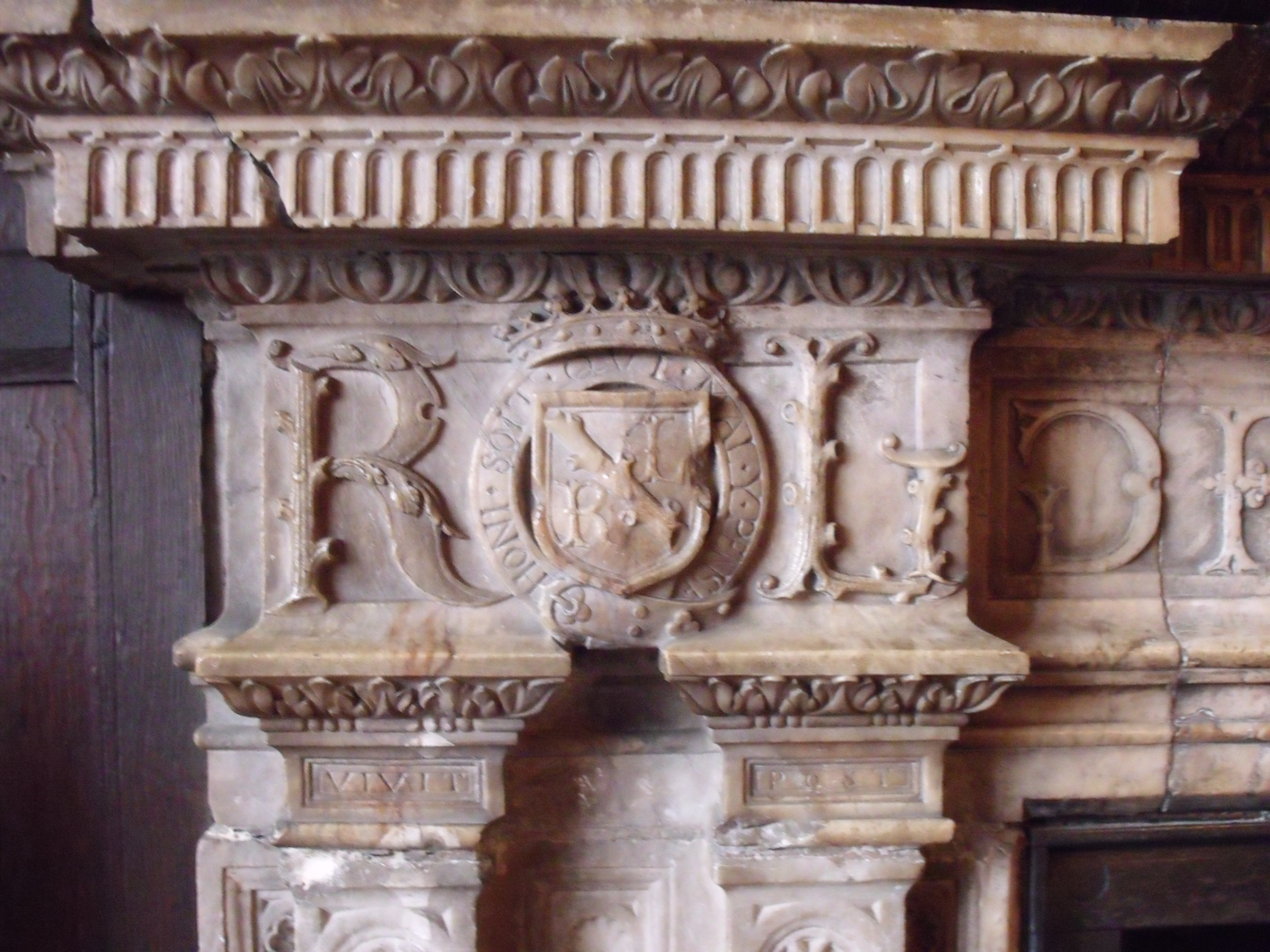
Fireplace at Kenilworth Castle, with shield displaying in bend the Ragged Staff of the Earls of Warwick, with the letters R and L for "Robert Leicester" for Robert Dudley

Ambrose and Robert Dudley were very close, in matters of business and personally. Through their paternal grandmother they descended from the Hundred Years War heroes, John Talbot, 1st Earl of Shrewsbury, and Richard Beauchamp, Earl of Warwick. Robert Dudley was especially fascinated by the Beauchamp descent and, with his brother, adopted the ancient heraldic device of the earls of Warwick, the Bear and Ragged Staff. Due to such genealogical aspects the West Midlands held a special significance for him. The town of Warwick felt this during a magnificent visit by the Earl in 1571 to celebrate the feast of the Order of Saint Michael, with which Leicester had been invested by the French king in 1566. He shortly afterwards founded Lord Leycester's Hospital, a charity for aged and injured soldiers still functioning today. Kenilworth Castle was the centre of Leicester's ambitions to "plant" himself in the region, and he substantially transformed the site's appearance through comprehensive alterations. He added a 15th-century style gatehouse to the castle's medieval structures, as well as a formal garden and a residential wing which featured the "brittle, thin walls and grids of windows" that were to become the hallmark of Elizabethan architecture in later decades. His works completed, the Earl staged a spectacular 19-day-festival in July 1575 as a final, allegorical bid for the Queen's hand; it was as much a request to give him leave to marry someone else. There was a Lady of the Lake, a swimming papier-mâché dolphin with a little orchestra in its belly, fireworks, masques, hunts, and popular entertainments like bear baiting. The whole scenery of landscape, artificial lake, castle, and Renaissance garden was ingeniously used for the entertainment.

== Love affairs and remarriage ==
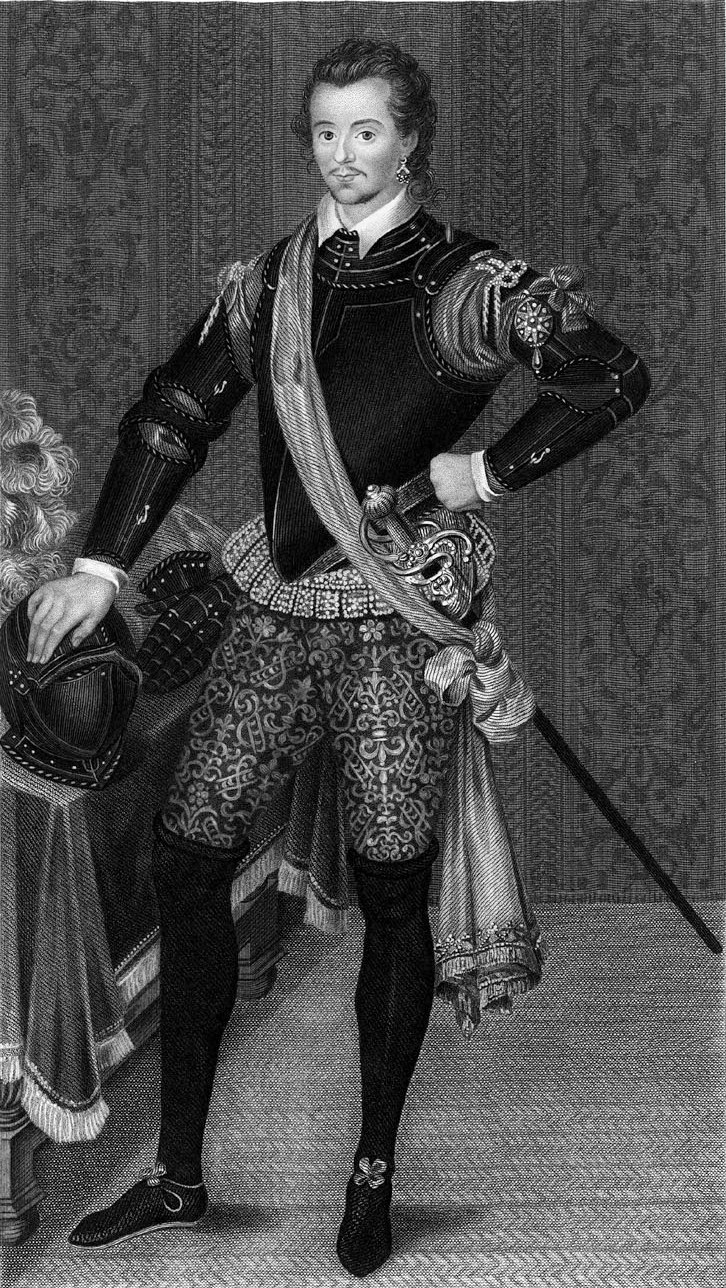
Sir Robert Dudley, son of Lady Douglas Sheffield and Robert Dudley

Confronted by a Puritan friend with rumours about his "ungodly life", Dudley defended himself in 1576:

I stand on the top of the hill, where ... the smallest slip seemeth a fall ... I may fall many ways and have more witnesses thereof than many others who perhaps be no saints neither ... for my faults ... they lie before Him who I have no doubt but will cancel them as I have been and shall be most heartily sorry for them.

With Douglas Sheffield, a young widow of the Howard family, he had a serious relationship from about 1569. He explained to her that he could not marry, not even in order to beget a Dudley heir, without his "utter overthrow":

You must think it is some marvellous cause ... that forceth me thus to be cause almost of the ruin of mine own house ... my brother you see long married and not like to have children, it resteth so now in myself; and yet such occasions is there ... as if I should marry I am sure never to have [the Queen's] favour".

Although in this letter Leicester said he still loved her as he did at the beginning, he offered her his help to find another husband for reasons of respectability if she so wished. The affair continued and in 1574 Douglas gave birth to a son, also called Robert Dudley.

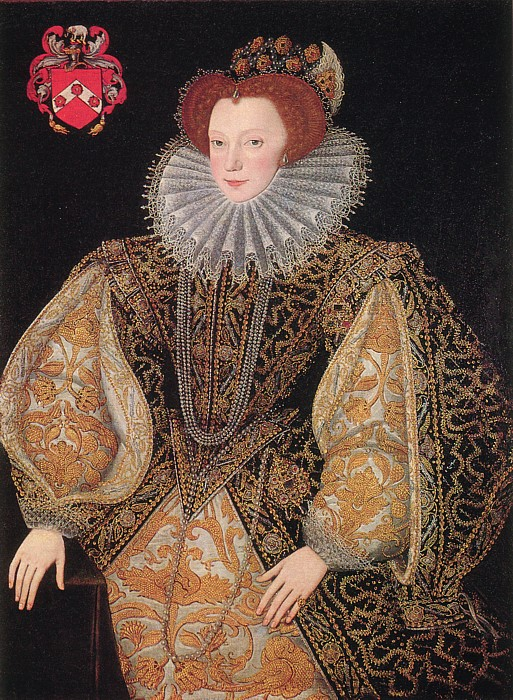
Lettice, Countess of Leicester, by George Gower c. 1585

Lettice Knollys was the wife of Walter Devereux, 1st Earl of Essex, and a first cousin once removed of Queen Elizabeth on her mother's side. Leicester had flirted with her in the summer of 1565, causing an outbreak of jealousy in the Queen. After Lord Essex went to Ireland in 1573, they possibly became lovers. There was much talk, and on Essex's homecoming in December 1575, "great enmity between the Earl of Leicester and the Earl of Essex" was expected. In July 1576 Essex returned to Ireland, where he died of dysentery in September. Rumours of poison, administered by the Earl of Leicester's means, were soon abroad. The Lord Deputy of Ireland, Sir Henry Sidney, conducted an official investigation which did not find any indications of foul play but "a disease appropriate to this country ... whereof ... died many". The rumours continued.

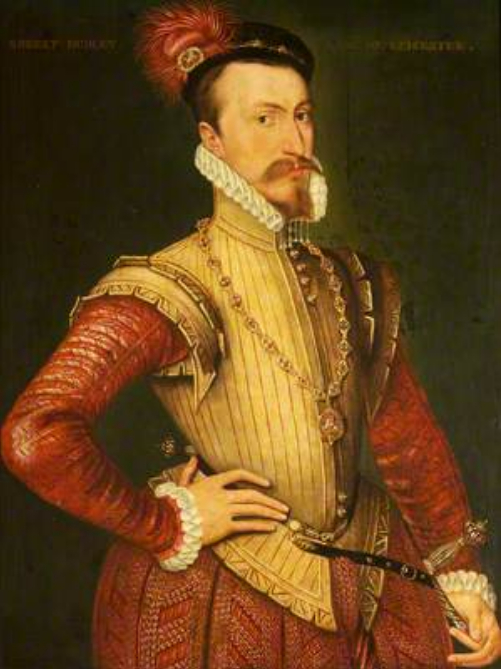
Robert Dudley, Anglo/Netherlandish School, c. 1565, National Trust, Montacute House

The prospect of marriage to the Countess of Essex on the horizon, Leicester finally drew a line under his relationship with Douglas Sheffield. Contrary to what she later claimed, they came to an amicable agreement over their son's custody. Young Robert grew up in Dudley's and his friends' houses, but had "leave to see" his mother until she left England in 1583. Leicester was very fond of his son and gave him an excellent education. In his will he left him the bulk of his estate (after his brother Ambrose's death), including Kenilworth Castle. Douglas Sheffield remarried in 1579. After the death of Elizabeth I in 1603, the younger Robert Dudley tried unsuccessfully to prove that his parents had married 30 years earlier in a secret ceremony. In that case, he would have been able to claim the earldoms of Leicester and Warwick. His mother supported him, but maintained that she had been strongly against raising the issue and was possibly pressured by her son. Leicester himself had throughout considered the boy as illegitimate. (Note: Sir Robert Dudley lost his case in the Star Chamber in 1605 (Warner 1899 p. xlvi). Historians have had differing views on the problem: While Derek Wilson believes in a marriage (Wilson 1981 p. 326), it has been rejected by, for example, Conyers Read (Read 1936 p. 23), Johanna Rickman (Rickman 2008 p. 51), and Simon Adams (Adams 2008d).)

On 21 September 1578, Leicester secretly married Lady Essex at his country house at Wanstead, with only a handful of relatives and friends present. He did not dare to tell the Queen of his marriage; nine months later Leicester's enemies at court acquainted her with the situation, causing a furious outburst. She already had been aware of his marriage plans a year earlier, though. Leicester's hope of an heir was fulfilled in 1581 when another Robert Dudley, styled Lord Denbigh, was born. The child died aged three in 1584, leaving his parents disconsolate. Leicester found comfort in God since, as he wrote, "princes ... seldom do pity according to the rules of charity." The Earl turned out to be a devoted husband: In 1583, the French ambassador, Michel de Castelnau, wrote of "the Earl of Leicester and his lady to whom he is much attached", and "who has much influence over him". Leicester was a concerned parent to his four stepchildren, and in every respect worked for the advancement of Robert Devereux, 2nd Earl of Essex, whom he regarded as his political heir.

The marriage of her favourite hurt the Queen deeply. She never accepted it, humiliating Leicester in public: "my open and great disgraces delivered from her Majesty's mouth". Then again, she would be as fond of him as ever. In 1583 she informed ambassadors that Lettice Dudley was "a she-wolf" and her husband a "traitor" and "a cuckold". Lady Leicester's social life was much curtailed. Even her movements could pose a political problem, as Francis Walsingham explained: "I see not her Majesty disposed to use the services of my Lord of Leicester. There is great offence taken at the conveying down of his lady." The Earl stood by his wife, asking his colleagues to intercede for her; there was no hope: "She [the Queen] doth take every occasion by my marriage to withdraw any good from me", Leicester wrote even after seven years of marriage.

== Colleagues and politics ==
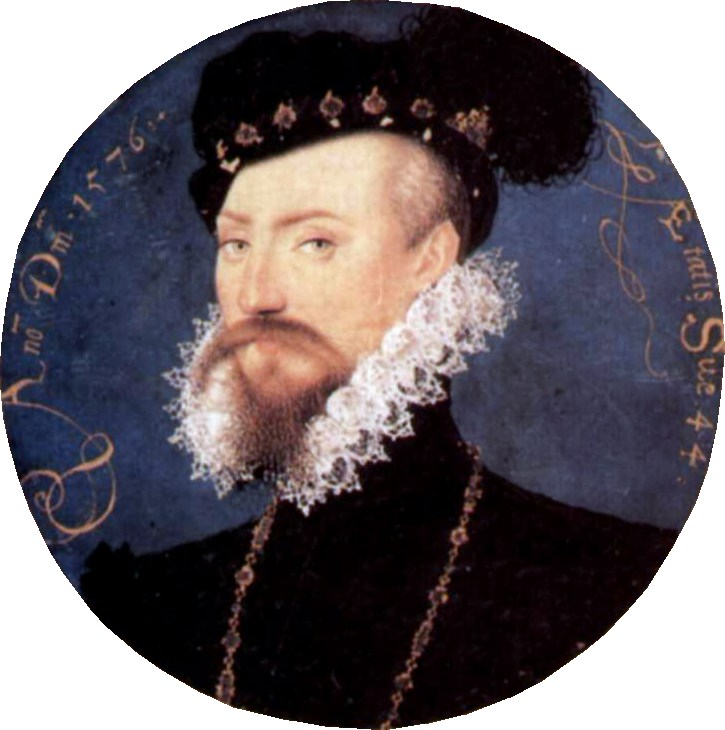
Robert Dudley in 1576, aged 44, as is stated in the margin. Miniature by Nicholas Hilliard

For the first 30 years of Elizabeth's reign, until Leicester's death, he and Lord Burghley were the most powerful and important political figures, working intimately with the Queen. Robert Dudley was a conscientious privy councillor, and one of the most frequently attending.

In 1560 the diplomat Nicholas Throckmorton advocated vehemently against Dudley marrying the Queen, but Dudley won him over in 1562. Throckmorton henceforth became his political advisor and intimate. After Throckmorton's death in 1571, there quickly evolved a political alliance between the Earl of Leicester and Sir Francis Walsingham, soon to be Secretary of State. Together they worked for a militant Protestant foreign policy. There also existed a family relationship between them after Walsingham's daughter had married Philip Sidney, Leicester's favourite nephew. Leicester, after some initial jealousy, also became a good friend of Sir Christopher Hatton, himself one of Elizabeth's favourites.

Robert Dudley's relationship with William Cecil, Lord Burghley, was complicated. Traditionally they have been seen as enemies, and Cecil behind the scenes sabotaged Dudley's endeavours to obtain the Queen's hand. On the other hand, they were on friendly terms and had an efficient working relationship which never broke down. In 1572, the vacant post of Lord High Treasurer was offered to Leicester, who declined and proposed Burghley, stating that the latter was the much more suitable candidate. In later years, being at odds, Dudley felt like reminding Cecil of their "thirty years friendship".

On the whole, Cecil and Dudley were in concord about policies while disagreeing fundamentally about some issues, such as the Queen's marriage and some areas of foreign policy. Cecil favoured the suit of Francois, Duke of Anjou, in 1578–1581 for Elizabeth's hand, while Leicester was among its strongest opponents, even contemplating exile in letters to Burghley. The Anjou courtship, at the end of which Leicester and several dozen noblemen and gentlemen escorted the French prince to Antwerp, also touched the question of English intervention in the Netherlands to help the rebellious provinces. This debate stretched over a decade until 1585, with the Earl of Leicester as the foremost interventionist. Burghley was more cautious of military engagement while in a dilemma over his Protestant predilections.

Until about 1571/1572, Dudley supported Mary Stuart's succession rights to the English throne. He was also, from the early 1560s, on the best terms with the Protestant lords in Scotland, thereby supporting the English or, as he saw it, the Protestant interest. After Mary Stuart's flight into England (1568) Leicester was, unlike Cecil, in favour of restoring her as Scottish queen under English control, preferably with a Protestant English husband, such as the Duke of Norfolk. In 1577 Leicester had a personal meeting with Mary and listened to her complaints about her captivity. By the early 1580s Mary had come to fear Leicester's influence with James VI, her son, in whose privy chamber the English Earl had placed a spy. She spread stories about his supposed lust for the English throne, and when the Catholic anti-Leicester libel, Leicester's Commonwealth, was published in 1584 Dudley believed that Mary was involved in its conception.

The Bond of Association, which the Privy Council gave out in October 1584, may have originated in Dudley's ideas. Circulated in the country, the document's subscribers swore that, should Elizabeth be assassinated (as William the Silent had been a few months earlier), not only the killer but also the royal person who would benefit from this should be executed. Leicester's relations with James of Scotland grew closer when he gained the confidence of the King's favourite, Patrick, Master of Gray, in 1584–1585. His negotiations with the Master were the basis for the Treaty of Berwick, a defensive alliance between the two British states against European powers. In 1586 Walsingham uncovered the Babington Plot. Following the Ridolfi Plot (1571) and the Throckmorton Plot (1583), this was another scheme to assassinate Elizabeth in which Mary Stuart was involved. Following her conviction, Leicester, then in the Netherlands, vehemently urged her execution in his letters; he despaired of Elizabeth's security after so many plots.

Leicester having returned to England, in February 1587 Elizabeth signed Mary's death warrant, with the proviso that it be not carried out until she gave her approval. As there was no sign of her doing so, Burghley, Leicester, and a handful of other privy councillors decided to proceed with Mary's execution in the interest of the state. Leicester went to Bath and Bristol for his health; unlike the other privy councillors involved, he escaped Elizabeth's severe wrath on hearing the news of Mary's death.

== Patronage ==
=== Exploration and business ===
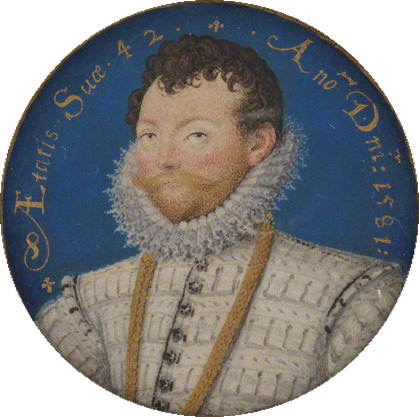
Sir Francis Drake. Leicester was happy to invest in his ventures and invite him to play cards.

Robert Dudley was a pioneer of new industries; interested in many things from tapestries to mining, he was engaged in the first joint stock companies in English history. The Earl also concerned himself with relieving unemployment among the poor. On a personal level, he gave to poor people, petitioners, and prisons on a daily basis. Due to his interests in trade and exploration, as well as his debts, his contacts with the London city fathers were intense. He was an enthusiastic investor in the Muscovy Company and the Merchant Adventurers. English relations with Morocco were also handled by Leicester. This he did in the manner of his private business affairs, underpinned by a patriotic and missionary zeal (commercially, these relations were loss-making). He took much interest in the careers of John Hawkins and Francis Drake from early on, and was a principal backer of Drake's circumnavigation of the world. Robert and Ambrose Dudley were also the principal patrons of Martin Frobisher's 1576 search for the Northwest Passage. Later Leicester acquired his own ship, the Galleon Leicester, which he employed in a luckless expedition under Edward Fenton, but also under Drake. As much as profit, English seapower was on his mind, and accordingly, Leicester became a friend and leading supporter of Dom António, the exiled claimant to the Portuguese throne after 1580.

=== Learning, theatre, the arts, and literature ===
Apart from their legal function, the Inns of Court were the Tudor equivalents of gentlemen's clubs. In 1561, grateful for favours he had done them, the Inner Temple admitted Dudley as their most privileged member, their "Lord and Governor". He was allowed to build his own apartments on the premises and organised grand festivities and performances in the Temple. As Chancellor of Oxford University Dudley was highly committed. He enforced the Thirty-nine Articles and the oath of royal supremacy at Oxford, and obtained from the Queen an incorporation by an act of Parliament, the Oxford and Cambridge Act 1571 (13 Eliz. 1. c. 29), for the university. Leicester was also instrumental in founding the official Oxford University Press, and installed the pioneer of international law, Alberico Gentili, and the exotic theologian, Antonio del Corro, at Oxford. Over del Corro's controversial case he even sacked the university's Vice-Chancellor.

Around 100 books were dedicated to Robert Dudley during Elizabeth's reign. In 1564/1567 Arthur Golding dedicated his popular translation of Ovid's Metamorphoses to the Earl. Dudley took a special interest in translations, which were seen as a means to popularise learning among "all who could read." He was also a history enthusiast, and in 1559 suggested to the tailor John Stow to become a chronicler (as Stow recalled in 1604). Robert Dudley's interest in the theatre was manifold, from academic plays at Oxford to the protection of the Children of St. Paul's and of the Royal Chapel, and their respective masters, against hostile bishops and landlords. From at least 1559 he had his own company of players, and in 1574 he obtained for them the first royal patent issued to actors to allow them to tour the country unmolested by local authorities. The Earl also kept a separate company of musicians who in 1586 played before the King of Denmark; with them travelled William Kempe, "the Lord Leicester's jesting player".

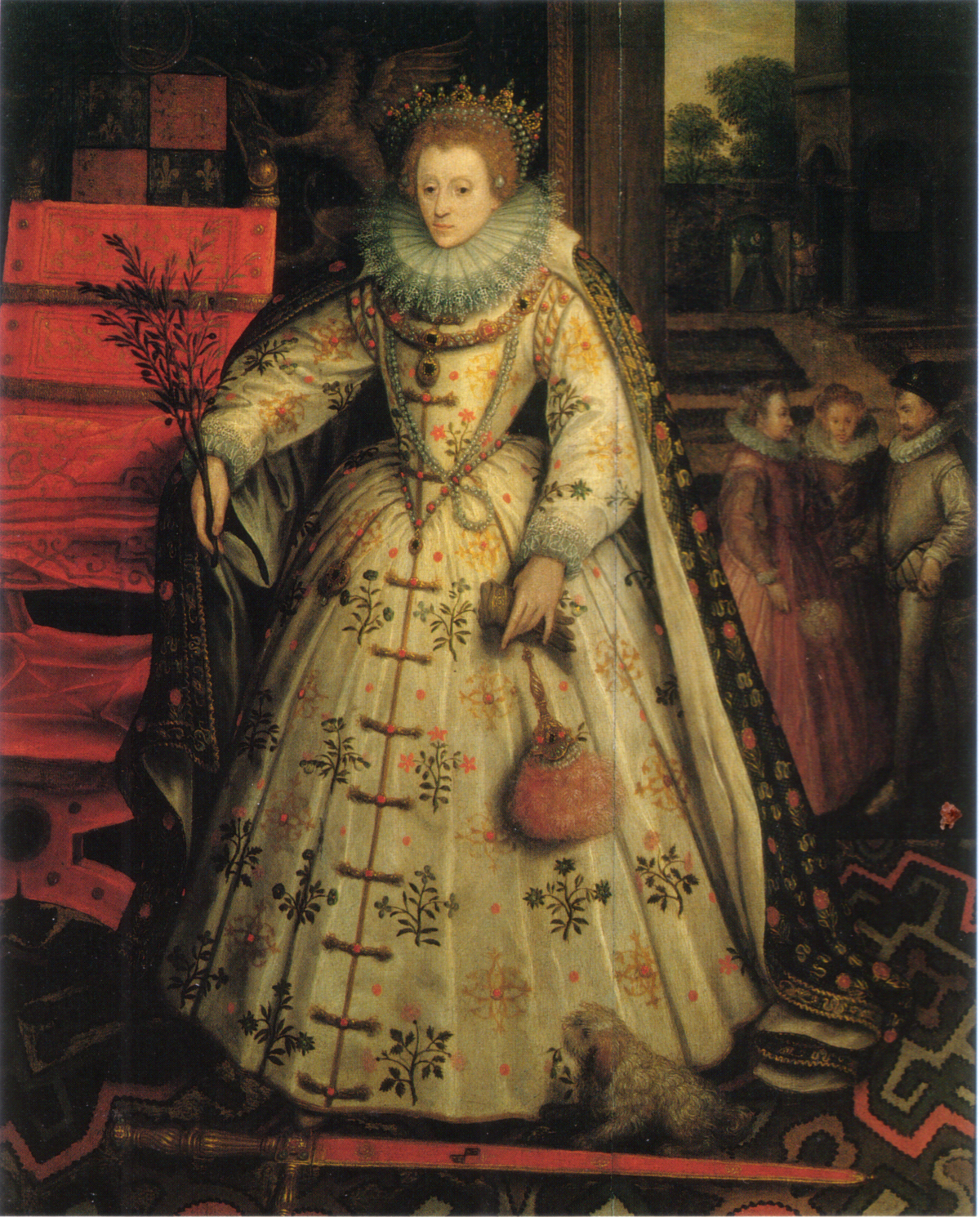
Queen Elizabeth at Wanstead Hall. The figures in the garden may include representations of Robert and Lettice Dudley. Painting by Marcus Gheeraerts the Elder

Leicester possessed one of the largest collections of paintings in Elizabethan England, being the first great private collector. He was a principal patron of Nicholas Hilliard, as well as interested in all aspects of Italian culture. The Earl's circle of scholars and men of letters included, among others, his nephew Philip Sidney, his niece Mary Sidney Herbert, the astrologer and Hermeticist John Dee, his secretaries Edward Dyer and Jean Hotman, as well as John Florio and Gabriel Harvey. Through Harvey, Edmund Spenser found employment at Leicester House on the Strand, the Earl's palatial town house, where he wrote his first works of poetry. Many years after Leicester's death Spenser wistfully recalled this time in his Prothalamion, and in 1591 he remembered the late Earl with his poem The Ruins of Time.

=== Religion ===
Robert Dudley grew up as a Protestant. Presumably conforming in public under Mary I, he was counted among the "heretics" by Philip II's agent before Elizabeth's accession. He immediately became a major patron to former Edwardian clerics and returning exiles. Meanwhile, he also helped some of Mary's former servants and maintained Catholic contacts. From 1561 he advocated and supported the Huguenot cause, and the French ambassador described him as "totally of the Calvinist religion" in 1568. After the St. Bartholomew's Day Massacre in 1572 this trait in him became more pronounced, and he continued as the chief patron of English Puritans and a champion of international Calvinism. On the other hand, in his household, Leicester employed Catholics like Sir Christopher Blount, who held a position of trust and of whom he was personally fond. The Earl's patronage of and reliance on individuals was as much a matter of old family loyalties or personal relationships as of religious allegiances.

Leicester was especially interested in the furtherance of preaching, which was the main concern of moderate Puritanism. He went to great lengths to support non-conforming preachers, while warning them against too radical positions which, he argued, would only endanger what reforms had been hitherto achieved. He would not condone the overthrow of the existing church model because of "trifles", he said. "I am not, I thank God, fantastically persuaded in religion but ... do find it soundly and godly set forth in this universal Church of England." Accordingly, he tried to smooth things out and, among other moves, initiated several disputations between the more radical elements of the Church and the episcopal side so that they "might make reconcilement". His influence in ecclesiastical matters was considerable until it declined in the 1580s under Archbishop John Whitgift.

== Governor-General of the United Provinces ==
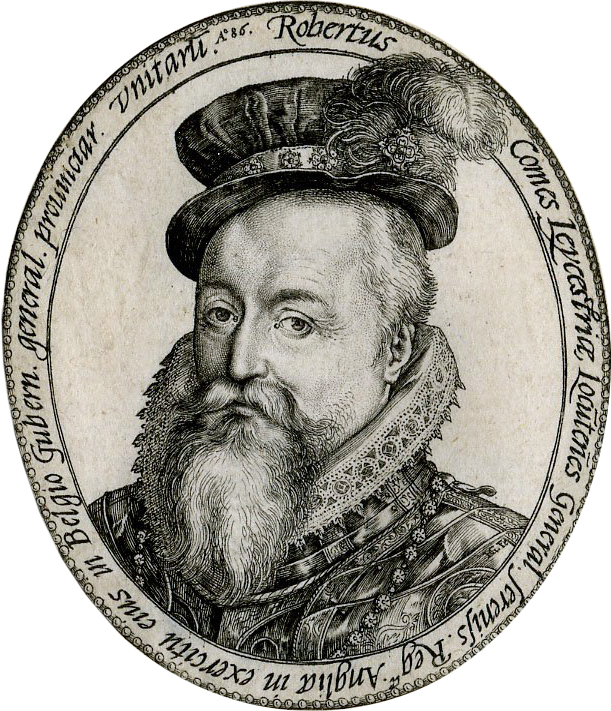
Leicester as Governor-General, 1586. Engraving by Hendrik Goltzius

During the 1570s, Leicester built a special relationship with Prince William of Orange, who held him in high esteem. The Earl became generally popular in the Netherlands. Since 1577 he pressed for an English military expedition, led by himself (as the Dutch strongly wished) to succour the rebels. In 1584 the Prince of Orange was murdered, political chaos ensued, and in August 1585 Antwerp fell to the Duke of Parma. An English intervention became inevitable; it was decided that Leicester would go to the Netherlands and "be their chief as heretofore was treated of", as he phrased it in August 1585. He was alluding to the recently signed Treaty of Nonsuch in which his position and authority as "governor-general" of the Netherlands had only been vaguely defined. The Earl prepared himself for "God's cause and her Majesty's" by recruiting the expedition's cavalry from his retainers and friends, and by mortgaging his estate to the sum of £25,000.

On Thursday, 9 December 1585, the Earl of Leicester set sail for the Low Countries from Harwich and landed after a swift crossing of less than 24 hours, the fleet anchored at Flushing (Vlissingen). At the end of December 1585 Leicester was received in the Netherlands, according to one correspondent, in the manner of a second Charles V; a Dutch town official already noted in his minute-book that the Earl was going to have "absolute power and authority". After progress through several cities and so many festivals he arrived in The Hague, where on 1 January 1586 he was urged to accept the title governor-general by the States General of the United Provinces. Leicester wrote to Burghley and Walsingham, explaining why he believed the Dutch importunities should be answered favourably. He accepted his elevation on 25 January, having not yet received any communications from England due to constant adverse winds.

The Earl had now "the rule and government general" with a Council of State to support him (the members of which he nominated himself). He remained a subject of Elizabeth, making it possible to contend that she was now sovereign over the Netherlands. According to Leicester, this was what the Dutch desired. From the start such a position for him had been implied in the Dutch propositions to the English, and in their instructions to Leicester; and it was consistent with the Dutch understanding of the Treaty of Nonsuch. The English queen, however, in her instructions to Leicester, had expressly declined to accept offers of sovereignty from the United Provinces while still demanding of the States to follow the "advice" of her lieutenant-general in matters of government. Her ministers on both sides of the Channel hoped she would accept the situation as a fait accompli and could even be persuaded to add the rebellious provinces to her possessions. Instead her fury knew no bounds and Elizabeth sent Sir Thomas Heneage to read out her letters of disapproval before the States General, Leicester having to stand nearby. Elizabeth's "commandment" was that the Governor-General immediately resign his post in a formal ceremony in the same place where he had taken it. After much pleading with her and protestations by the Dutch, it was postulated that the governor-generalship had been bestowed not by any sovereign, but by the States General and thereby by the people. The damage was done, however: "My credit hath been cracked ever since her Majesty sent Sir Thomas Heneage hither", Leicester recapitulated in October 1586.

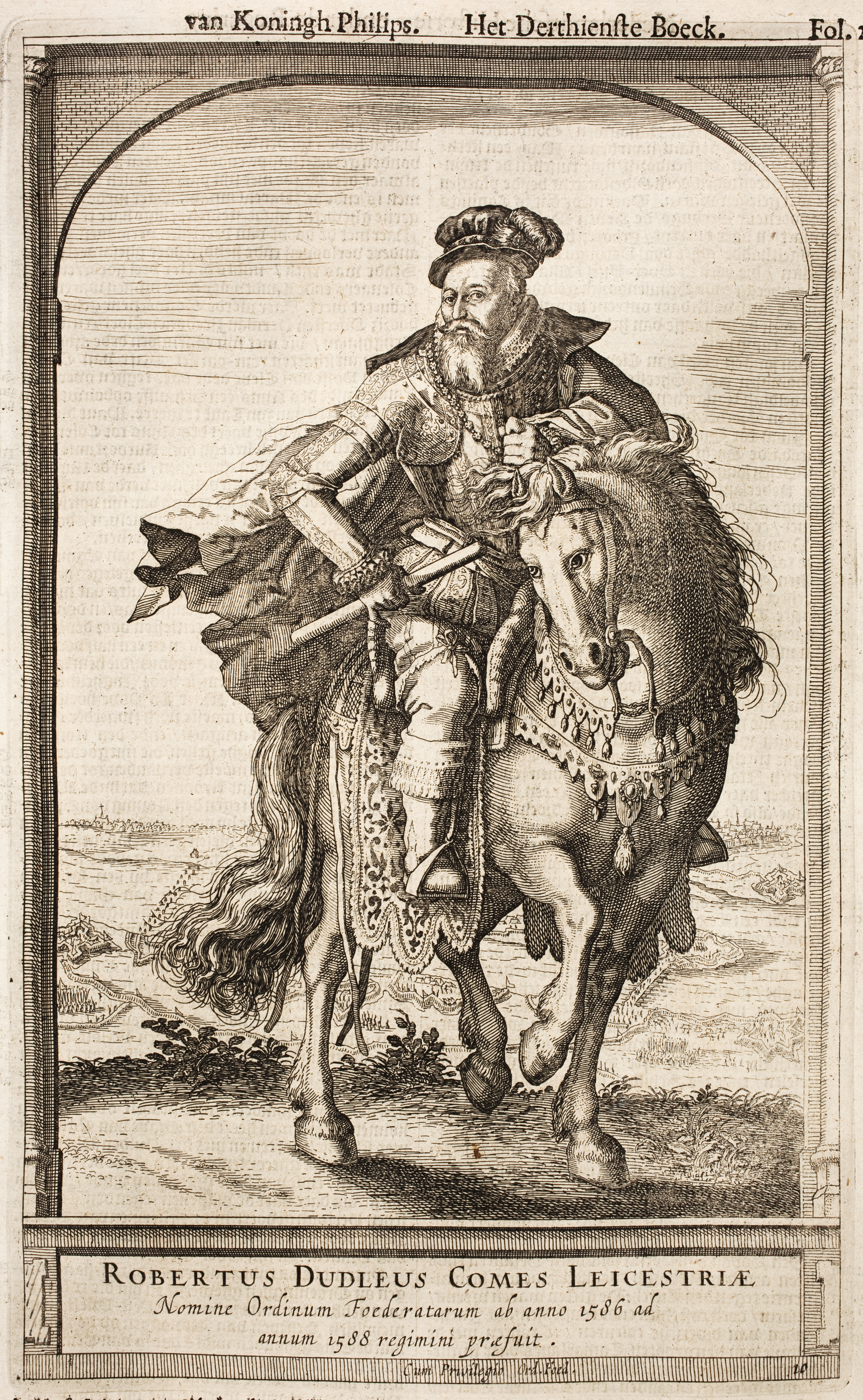
Engraving of Robert Dudley as Governor-General, on horseback

Elizabeth demanded of her Lieutenant-General to refrain at all costs from any decisive action with Parma, which was the opposite of what Leicester wished and what the Dutch expected of him. After some initial successes, the unexpected surrender of the strategically important town of Grave was a serious blow to English morale. Leicester's fury turned on the town's governor, Baron Hemart, whom he had executed despite all pleadings. The Dutch nobility were astonished: even the Prince of Orange would not have dared such an outrage, Leicester was warned; but, he wrote, he would not be intimidated by the fact that Hemart "was of a good house".

Leicester's forces, small and seriously underfinanced from the outset, faced the most formidable army in Europe. Unity among their ranks was at risk by Leicester's and the other officers' quarrels with Sir John Norris, who had commanded previous English contingents in the Netherlands and was now the Earl's deputy. Elizabeth was angry that the war cost more than anticipated and for many months delayed sending money and troops. This not only forced Dudley to raise further funds on his own account, but much aggravated the soldiers' lot. "They cannot get a penny; their credit is spent; they perish for want of victuals and clothing in great numbers ... I assure you it will fret me to death ere long to see my soldiers in this case and cannot help them", Leicester wrote home.

Many Dutch statesmen were essentially politiques; they soon became disenchanted with the Earl's enthusiastic fostering of what he called "the religion". His most loyal friends were the Calvinists at Utrecht and Friesland, provinces in constant opposition to Holland and Zeeland. Those rich provinces engaged in a lucrative trade with Spain which was very helpful to either side's war effort. On Elizabeth's orders Leicester enforced a ban on this trade with the enemy, thus alienating the wealthy Dutch merchants. He also affected a fiscal reform. In order to centralise finances and to replace the highly corrupt tax farming with direct taxation, a new Council of Finances was established which was not under the supervision of the Council of State. The Dutch members of the Council of State were outraged at these bold steps. English peace talks with Spain behind Leicester's back, which had started within days after he had left England, undermined his position further.

In September 1586 there was a skirmish at Zutphen, in which Philip Sidney was wounded. He died a few weeks later. His uncle's grief was great. In December Leicester returned to England. In his absence, William Stanley and Rowland York, two Catholic officers whom Leicester had placed in command of Deventer and the fort of Zutphen, respectively, went over to Parma, along with their key fortresses—a disaster for the Anglo-Dutch coalition in every respect. His Dutch friends, as his English critics, pressed for Leicester's return to the Netherlands. Shortly after his arrival in June 1587 the English-held port of Sluis was lost to Parma, Leicester being unable to assert his authority over the Dutch allies, who refused to cooperate in relieving the town. After this blow Elizabeth, who ascribed it to "the malice or other foul error of the States", was happy to enter into peace negotiations with the Duke of Parma. By December 1587 the differences between Elizabeth and the Dutch politicians, with Leicester in between, had become insurmountable; he asked to be recalled by the Queen and gave up his post. He was irredeemably in debt because of his personal financing of the war.

== Armada and death ==
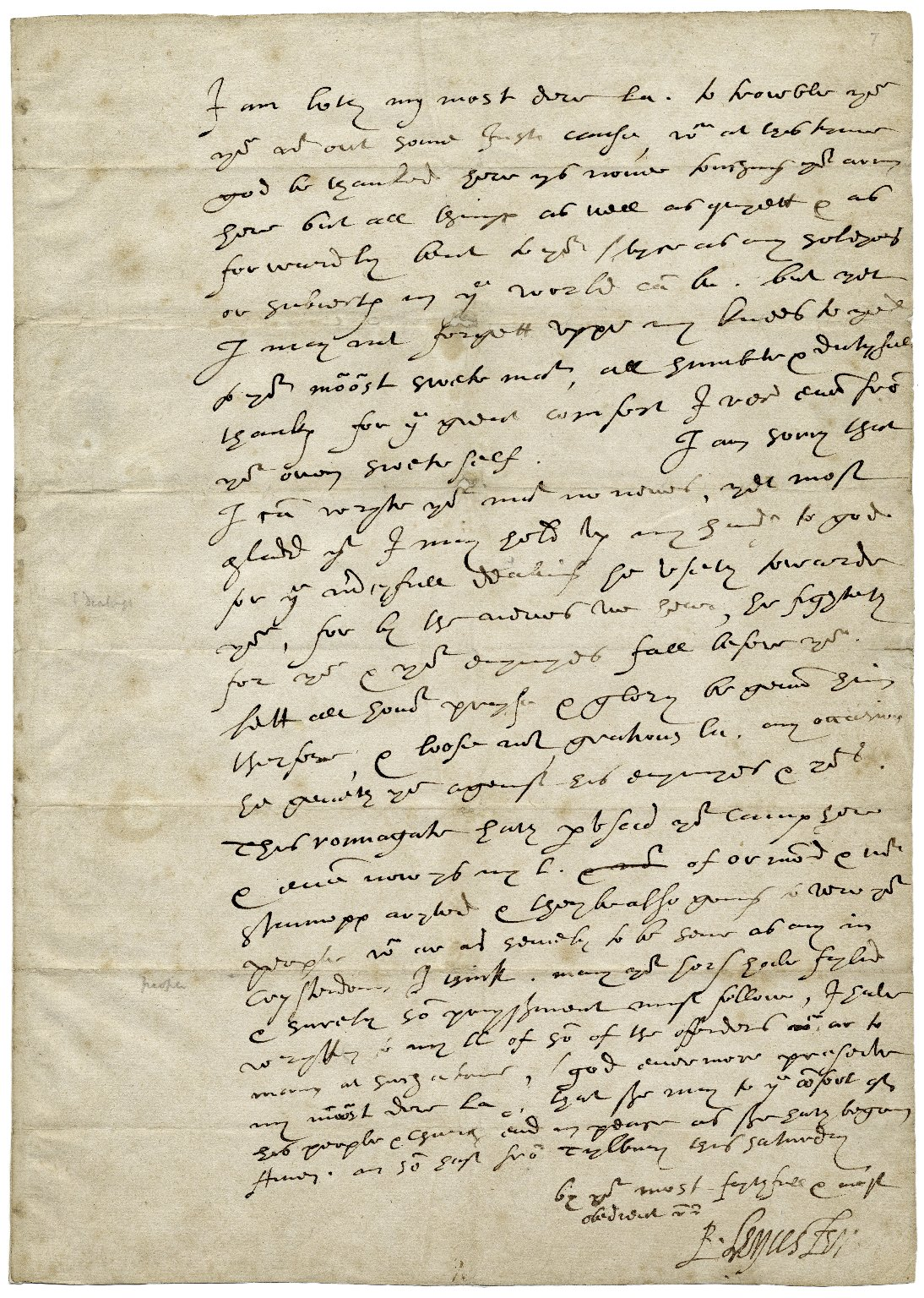
A letter from Leicester to Elizabeth I, written at the Armada camp and signed with his nickname, "Eyes"

In July 1588, as the Spanish Armada came nearer, the Earl of Leicester was appointed "Lieutenant and Captain-General of the Queen's Armies and Companies". At Tilbury on the Thames he erected a camp for the defence of London, should the Spaniards land. Leicester vigorously counteracted the disorganisation he found everywhere, having few illusions about "all sudden hurley-burleys", as he wrote to Walsingham. When the Privy Council was already considering disbanding the camp to save money, Leicester held against it, setting about to plan with the Queen a visit to her troops. On the day she gave her famous speech he walked beside her horse, bare-headed.

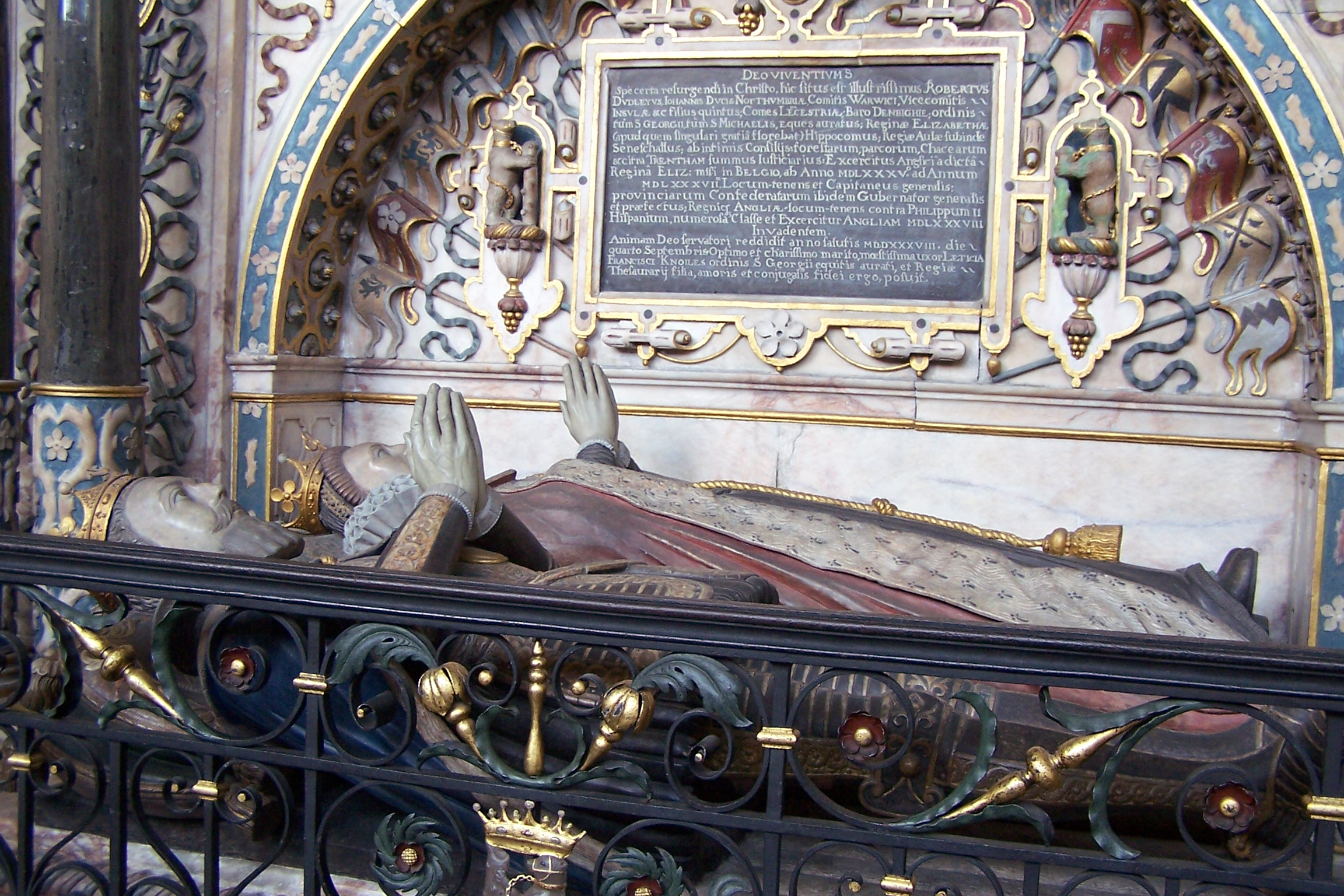
The tomb of Robert and Lettice Dudley, erected by the Countess. Beauchamp Chapel, Warwick

After the Armada, the Earl was seen riding in splendour through London "as if he were a king", and for the last few weeks of his life he usually dined with the Queen, a unique favour. On his way to Buxton in Derbyshire to take the baths, he died at Cornbury Park near Oxford, on 4 September 1588. Leicester's health had not been good for some time; historians have considered malaria and stomach cancer as causes of death. His death came unexpectedly, and only a week earlier he had said farewell to Elizabeth. She was deeply affected and locked herself in her apartment for a few days until Lord Burghley had the door broken. Her nickname for Dudley had been "Eyes", which was symbolised by the sign of ôô in their letters to each other. Elizabeth kept the letter he had sent her six days before his death in her bedside treasure box, endorsing it with "his last letter" on the outside. It was still there when she died 15 years later on 24 March 1603.

Leicester was buried, as he had requested, in the Beauchamp Chapel of the Collegiate Church of St Mary, Warwick on 10 October 1588—in the same chapel as Richard Beauchamp, his ancestor, and the "noble Impe", his little son. Countess Lettice was also buried there when she died in 1634, alongside the "best and dearest of husbands", as the epitaph, which she commissioned, says.

== Historiographical treatment ==
The book which later became known as Leicester's Commonwealth was written by Catholic exiles in Paris and printed anonymously in 1584. (Note: The original title began: The copie of a leter, wryten by a Master of Arte of Cambrige ... (WorldCat. Retrieved 5 April 2010.) In 1641, it was reprinted in London as Leycesters Commonwealth (Burgoyne 1904 p. vii).) It was published shortly after the death of Leicester's son, which is alluded to in a stop-press marginal note: "The children of adulterers shall be consumed, and the seed of a wicked bed shall be rooted out." Smuggled into England, the libel became a best-seller with underground booksellers and the next year was translated into French. Its underlying political agenda is the succession of Mary, Queen of Scots, to the English throne, but its most outstanding feature is an all-round attack on the Earl of Leicester. He is presented as an atheistic, hypocritical coward, a "perpetuall Dictator", terrorising the Queen and ruining the whole country. He is engaged in a long-term conspiracy to snatch the Crown from Elizabeth in order to settle it first on his brother-in-law, the Earl of Huntingdon, and ultimately on himself. Spicy details of his monstrous private life are revealed, and he appears as an expert poisoner of many high-profile personalities. This influential classic is the origin of many aspects of Leicester's historical reputation. Similar conspiracies are often mentioned in coded letters from Mary, Queen of Scots, to the French ambassador.

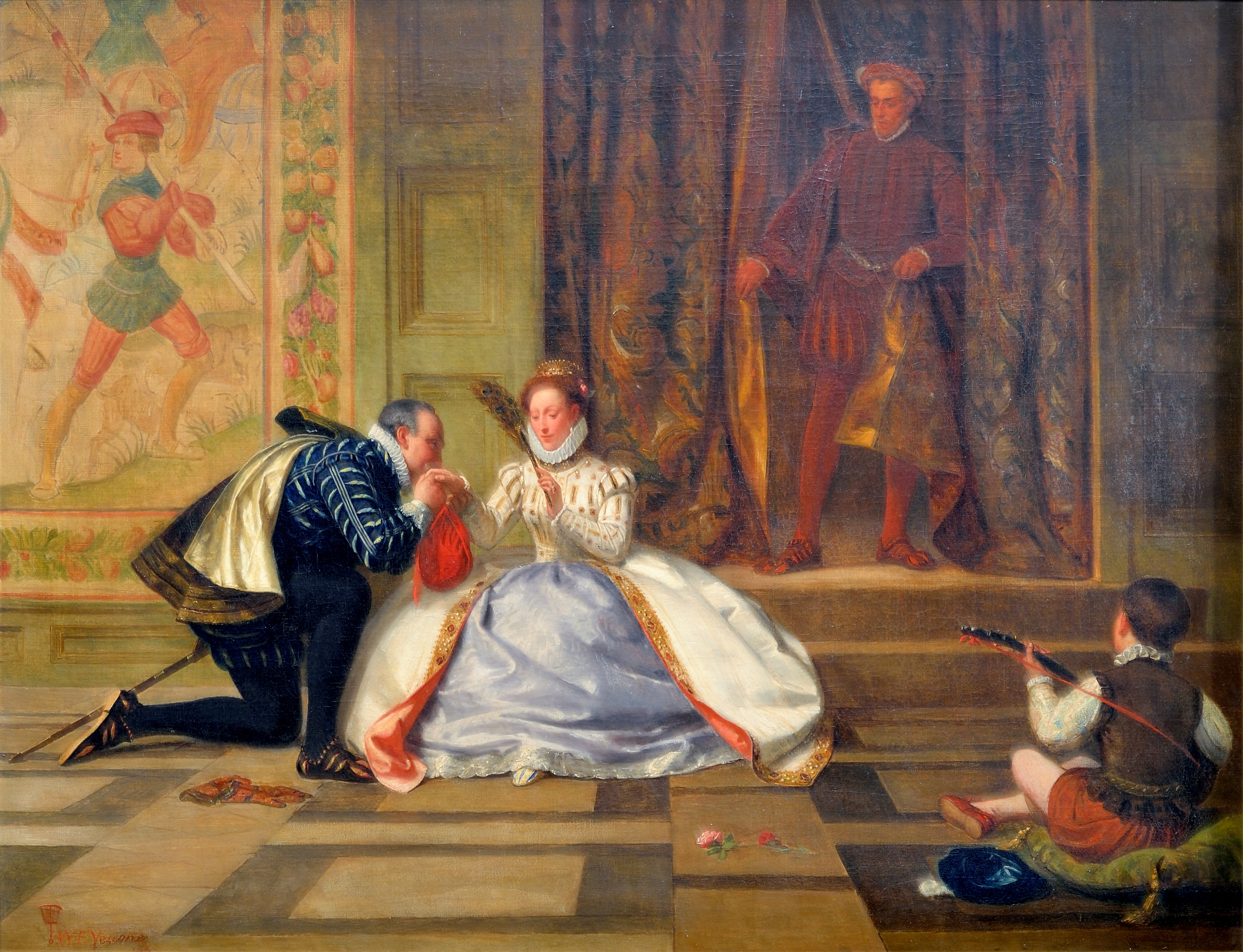
Queen Elizabeth and Leicester by William Frederick Yeames, 1865

In the early 17th century, William Camden saw "some secret constellation" of the stars at work between Elizabeth and her favourite; he firmly established the legend of the perfect courtier with the sinister influence. Some of the most often-quoted characterisations of Leicester, such as that he "was wont to put up all his passions in his pocket", his nickname of "the Gypsy", and Elizabeth's "I will have here but one mistress and no master"-reprimand to him, were contributed by Sir Henry Wotton and Sir Robert Naunton almost half a century after the Earl's death.

The Victorian historian James Anthony Froude saw Robert Dudley as Elizabeth's soft plaything, combining "in himself the worst qualities of both sexes. Without courage, without talent, without virtue". The habit of comparing him unfavourably to William Cecil was continued by Conyers Read in 1925: "Leicester was a selfish, unscrupulous courtier and Burghley a wise and patriotic statesman". Geoffrey Elton, in his widely read England under the Tudors (1955), saw Dudley as "a handsome, vigorous man with very little sense."

Since the 1950s, academic assessment of the Earl of Leicester has undergone considerable changes. Leicester's importance in literary patronage was established by Eleanor Rosenberg in 1955. Elizabethan Puritanism has been thoroughly reassessed since the 1960s, and Patrick Collinson has outlined the Earl's place in it. Dudley's religion could thus be better understood, rather than simply to brand him as a hypocrite. His importance as a privy councillor and statesman has often been overlooked, one reason being that many of his letters are scattered among private collections and not easily accessible in print, as are those of his colleagues Walsingham and Cecil. Alan Haynes describes him as "one of the most strangely underrated of Elizabeth's circle of close advisers", while Simon Adams, who since the early 1970s has researched many aspects of Leicester's life and career, concludes: "Leicester was as central a figure to the 'first reign' [of Elizabeth] as Burghley."

== Cultural depictions ==
=== TV ===
- Elizabeth R (1971) - Robert Hardy
- Elizabeth (2000) - Richard Trinder
- The Virgin Queen (2005) - Tom Hardy
- Elizabeth I (2005) - Jeremy Irons
- Reign (2015) - Charlie Carrick
- Elizabeth I (2017) - James Groom
- Queens: The Virgin and the Martyr (2017) - Tom Christian
- Becoming Elizabeth (2022) - Jamie Blackley

=== Films ===
- Fire Over England (1937) - Leslie Banks
- The Virgin Queen (1955) - Herbert Marshall
- Mary, Queen of Scots (1971) - Daniel Massey
- Elizabeth (1998) - Joseph Fiennes
- Mary Queen of Scots (2018) - Joe Alwyn

=== Plays ===
- Three Queens, written by Rosamund Gravelle; role originated by Sushant Shekhar

=== Books ===
- Rival to the Queen (2010), written by Carolly Erickson
- To Shield The Queen (1997), by Fiona Buckley

== See also ==
- Alienation Office
- Cultural depictions of Elizabeth I of England
- Lady Catherine Grey
- Greenwich armour
- Kenilworth (novel)
- Leicester's Men
- Maria Stuarda (opera)
- Mary Stuart (play)
- Sebastian Westcott
- The Masque at Kenilworth
- Arthur Dudley

== Citations ==
Political offices
Preceded by Sir Henry Jernyngham	Master of the Horse; 1558–1587	Succeeded by The Earl of Essex
Vacant	Lord Steward; 1587–1588	Succeeded by Lord St John of Basing
Preceded by Sir John Salusbury	Custos Rotulorum of Denbighshire bef. 1573–1588	Succeeded by Thomas Egerton
Preceded by John Griffith	Custos Rotulorum of Flintshire bef. 1584–1588	Succeeded by Thomas Egerton
Preceded by Sir Ambrose Cave	Custos Rotulorum of Warwickshire bef. 1573–1588	Succeeded by Sir Fulke Greville
Preceded by Maurice Wynn	Custos Rotulorum of Caernarvonshire bef. 1579–1588	Succeeded by William Maurice
Preceded by Ellis Price	Custos Rotulorum of Merionethshire bef. 1579–1588	Succeeded by Sir Robert Salusbury
Preceded by Sir Richard Bulkeley	Custos Rotulorum of Anglesey bef. 1584–1588	Succeeded by Sir Richard Bulkeley
Court offices
Preceded by The Earl of Warwick	Master of the Buckhounds; 1552–1553	Succeeded by ?
Academic offices
Preceded by ?	High Stewart of Cambridge University; 1563–1588	Succeeded by Sir Christopher Hatton
Preceded by John Mason	Chancellor of the University of Oxford; 1564–1588; With: Sir Thomas Bromley as deputy 1585–1588	Succeeded by Sir Christopher Hatton
Legal offices
Preceded by The Earl of Bedford	Justice in Eyre south of the Trent; 1585–1588	Succeeded by The Lord Hunsdon
