= Camelford (constituency) =

Former parliamentary constituency in the United Kingdom

- Former borough constituency for the House of Commons

1552–1832
- Seats: Two
- Replaced by: East Cornwall

Camelford was a rotten borough in Cornwall which returned two Members of Parliament to the House of Commons in the English and later British Parliament from 1552 to 1832, when it was abolished by the Great Reform Act.

== History ==
The borough consisted of the town of Camelford, a market town in northern Cornwall, and part of the surrounding Lanteglos-by-Camelford parish. Like most of the Cornish boroughs enfranchised or re-enfranchised during the Tudor period, it was a rotten borough from the start.

The right to vote was disputed in the 18th century, but according to a judgment of 1796, belonged to those "free burgesses" who were resident householders paying scot and lot. The number of voters varied as new free burgesses were created, but was estimated to be 31 in 1831. Free burgesses were made only by nomination of the "patron", who owned all the houses in the borough, and the voters always voted in accordance with the patron's instructions.

The patronage, and the borough, changed hands several times. In the 1760s, before the exclusive voting rights of the free burgesses were established, the elections were managed by Charles Phillips for the government, and Camelford was considered a secure Treasury Borough (one where ministers could nominate the MPs as a form of patronage). Later the power of the patron became more complete, and in 1812 The Duke of Bedford was able to sell it for £32,000, forcing its MP, Henry Brougham, to find a new seat as his radical politics were unacceptable to the new owner. From 1814 until the Great Reform Act, the owner was the Earl of Darlington (later Marquess and Duke of Cleveland).

Cleveland was forced to secure his influence by regular payments to the voters, making Camelford one of the most notorious examples of corruption that were cited at the time of the Reform Act. In 1819, after two successive elections had been declared void and all the candidates disqualified for "treating", the writ was suspended, temporarily depriving the borough of its representation, although this only lasted until a new Parliament was summoned the following year. The Morning Chronicle noted in 1830 that "Everyone has heard of what Camelford cost the Marquess of Cleveland till the arrangement with the Marquess of Hertford. The Members who were returned for the marquess paid the voters in £1 notes enclosed in a deal box marked 'China'."

In 1831, the borough had an estimated population of 597, and 110 houses.

== Members of Parliament ==
=== 1553-1640 ===
Parliament	First member	Second member
First Parliament of 1553	John Huyke	Nicholas St John
Second Parliament of 1553	Francis Roscarock	Ambrose Gilbes
Parliament of 1554	Thomas Arundell	George Stafford
Parliament of 1554-1555	Francis Roscarock	Clement Tyfferd
Parliament of 1555	William Carryl	George Tadlow
Parliament of 1558	Thomas Prideaux	William St Aubyn
Parliament of 1559	John Smith	Sir Thomas Chamberlain
Parliament of 1563-1567	William Patridge	Drue Drury
Parliament of 1571	Nicholas Prideaux	Edward Williams
Parliament of 1572-1581	John Gifford	George Grenville, junior
Parliament of 1584-1585	Richard Trefusis	Emanuel Chamond
Parliament of 1586-1587	Richard Trefusis	Geoffrey Gates
Parliament of 1588-1589	Richard Trefusis	Arthur Gorges
Parliament of 1593	Humphrey Mitchell	Richard Leech
Parliament of 1597-1598	Jerome Horsey	Henry Carnesewe
Parliament of 1601	William Carnesew	Anthony Turpin
Parliament of 1604-1611	John Good	Anthony Turpin
Addled Parliament (1614)	George Cotton	Robert Naunton
Parliament of 1621-1622	Sir Henry Carey	Edward Carr
Happy Parliament (1624-1625)	Sir Francis Cottington	Edward Hare
Useless Parliament (1625)	Sir Henry Hungate	Thomas Coteel
Parliament of 1625-1626	Edward Lyndley	Sir Thomas Monk
Parliament of 1628-1629	Francis Crossing	Evan Edwards
No Parliament summoned 1629-1640

=== 1640-1832 ===
Year	First member	First party	Second member	Second party
April 1640	Piers Edgcumbe	Royalist	Edward Reade	
November 1640	Piers Edgcumbe	Royalist	William Glanville	Royalist
January 1644	Edgcumbe and Glanville disabled from sitting - both seats vacant			
1647	William Say		Gregory Clement (?)	
May 1652	William Say		Clement expelled - his seat left vacant	
1653	Camelford was unrepresented in the Barebones Parliament and the First and Second Parliaments of the Protectorate			
January 1659	John Maynard		William Bradden	
May 1659	William Say		One seat vacant	
April 1660	Peter Killigrew		Samuel Trelawny	
June 1660	Thomas Vivian		William Cotton	
1661	Thomas Coventry		Charles Roscarrock	
1665	Thomas Coventry		(Sir) William Godolphin	
February 1679	Sir James Smyth		William Harbord	
April 1679	Sir James Smyth		Robert Russell	
April 1685	Humphrey Langford		Nicholas Courtney	
September 1685	Sir Charles Scarborough		Nicholas Courtney	
1689	Ambrose Manaton		Henry Manaton	Tory
1695	Ambrose Manaton		Robert Molesworth	Whig
1696	Sidney Wortley Montagu	Whig	Robert Molesworth	Whig
1698	Henry Manaton	Tory	Dennys Glynn	
1704	William Pole	Tory	Dennys Glynn	
1705	William Pole	Tory	Henry Pinnell	
1708	Richard Munden		John Manley	Tory
1710	Bernard Granville		Jasper Radcliffe	
March 1711	Bernard Granville		Henry Manaton	Tory
May 1711	Bernard Granville		Paul Orchard	
1712	Sir Bourchier Wrey	Tory	Paul Orchard	
1713	Sir Bourchier Wrey	Tory	James Nicholls	
1715	James Montagu		Richard Coffin	Whig
1722	The Earl of Drogheda	Whig	William Sloper	
1727	Thomas Hales	Whig	John Pitt	
1734	Sir Thomas Lyttelton		James Cholmondeley	
1741	The Earl of Inchiquin		Charles Montagu	
1747	The Earl of Londonderry		Samuel Martin	
1754	John Lade		Samuel Martin	
1759	Bartholomew Burton		Samuel Martin	
1768	Charles Phillips		William Wilson	
1774	John Amyand		Francis Herne	
1776	John Amyand		Sir Ralph Payne	
1780	John Pardoe		James Macpherson	
April 1784	Jonathan Phillips		James Macpherson	
July 1784	Sir Samuel Hannay, Bt		James Macpherson	
1791	William Smith	Whig	James Macpherson	
March 1796	William Smith	Whig	Lord William Bentinck	Whig
May 1796	William Joseph Denison		John Angerstein	Whig
1802	Robert Adair	Whig	John Fonblanque	Whig
1806	Robert Adair	Whig	Viscount Maitland	Whig
1807	Robert Adair	Whig	Lord Henry Petty	Whig
1810	Robert Adair	Whig	Henry Brougham	Whig
1812	William Leader		Samuel Scott	
1818	Mark Milbank	Whig	John Bushby Maitland	Whig
1819	John Stewart	Tory	Lewis Allsopp	Tory
1819	Camelford's representation suspended 1819-1820			
1820	Mark Milbank	Whig	Earl of Yarmouth	Tory
1822	Mark Milbank	Whig	Sheldon Cradock	Whig
1832	Constituency abolished			
