= Sheldon Cradock =

English politician

- Arms Cradock of Hartforth, Yorkshire

Member of Parliament for Camelford
- In office 1822–1832 Serving with Mark Milbank
- Preceded by: Mark Milbank; The Earl of Yarmouth
- Succeeded by: Constituency abolished

Personal details
- Born: 27 September 1777
- Died: 19 February 1852 (aged 74)
- Children: 9
- Parent(s): Sheldon Cradock; Elizabeth Wilkinson
- Education: Manchester Grammar School
- Alma mater: Trinity College, Cambridge

Colonel Sheldon Cradock (27 September 1777 – 19 February 1852) was an English landowner and Whig politician.

== Early life ==
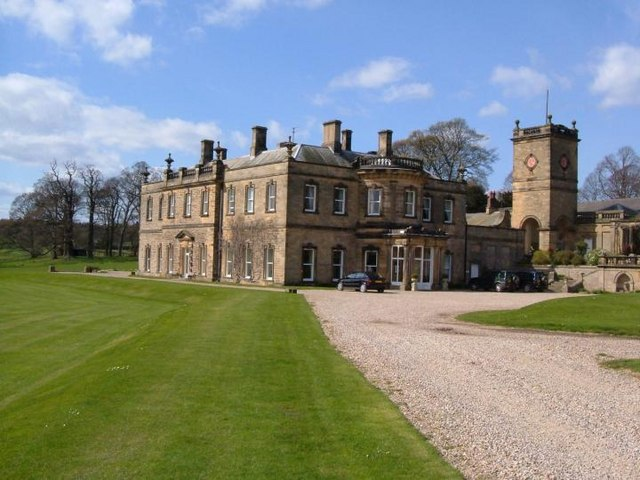
Hartforth Hall

Cardock was born on 27 September 1777 as the eldest and only surviving son of Sheldon Cradock of Hartforth and Elizabeth Wilkinson (daughter and heiress of Christopher Wilkinson of Thorpe-on-Tees). He succeeded to his father's estates in County Durham in 1814, where his family had been established since the 27th century. In 1730, his great-grandfather, William Cradock, had acquired the Hartforth estate (three miles from Richmond), and through his parents' marriage, they gained more Yorkshire property at Thorpe.

He was educated at Manchester Grammar School before matriculating at Trinity College, Cambridge in 1794.

== Career ==
He was a Captain in the North York Militia in 1800, a Major in 1804, Lt.-Col. in 1816, and Col. from 1820 to 1846.

In June 1822 he was returned on a vacancy alongside Mark Milbank for Camelford by his Durham neighbour, Lord Darlington (later the 1st Duke of Cleveland), after a contest. Milbank was Lord Darlington's son-in-law. After the parliamentary reforms, Cradock did not seek election.

== Personal life ==
Cardock, who never married, had nine illegitimate children, three sons and six daughters born between 1821 and 1836 by Jane Wilson, formerly of Saltburn, including:

- Annie Cradock (b. 1823), who married François de Josselin.
- Elizabeth Cradock (1824–1878), who married Samuel Smithson.
- Christopher Cradock (1825–1896), who entered Trinity College, Cambridge as Christopher Wilson in 1842; he married Georgina Cradock Duff.
- Mary Cradock (1827–1917), who married William John Tweedie.
- Frances Cardock (1833–1889), who married Francis Horsley.
- Margaret Cradock (1837–1918), who married Robert Lidwill Brown, a son of John Brown and Mary Charlotte Lidwill, in 1862.

Cardock died on 19 February 1852. In his will, he left property at Marske to a "single woman", Jane Wilson, with remainder to his six daughters with her. He left property at Stapleton, near Darlington to his younger illegitimate sons, Richard and Henry. The primary family estates passed to his eldest son Christopher.

=== Descendants ===
Through his son Christopher, he was a grandfather of Rear Admiral Sir Christopher Cradock, who was killed during the Battle of Coronel off the coast of Chile in November when the German ships sank his flagship.

Through his daughter Margaret, he was a grandfather of Helen Cowley Brow, who married Charles Sadleir Musgrave Trench (son of Hon. Cosby Godolphin Trench and a grandson of the 2nd Baron Ashtown).

Parliament of the United Kingdom
Preceded by The Earl of Yarmouth; Mark Milbank	Member of Parliament for Camelford; 1822–1832; With: Mark Milbank	Succeeded by Constituency abolished
