= Francis Crossing =

English politician

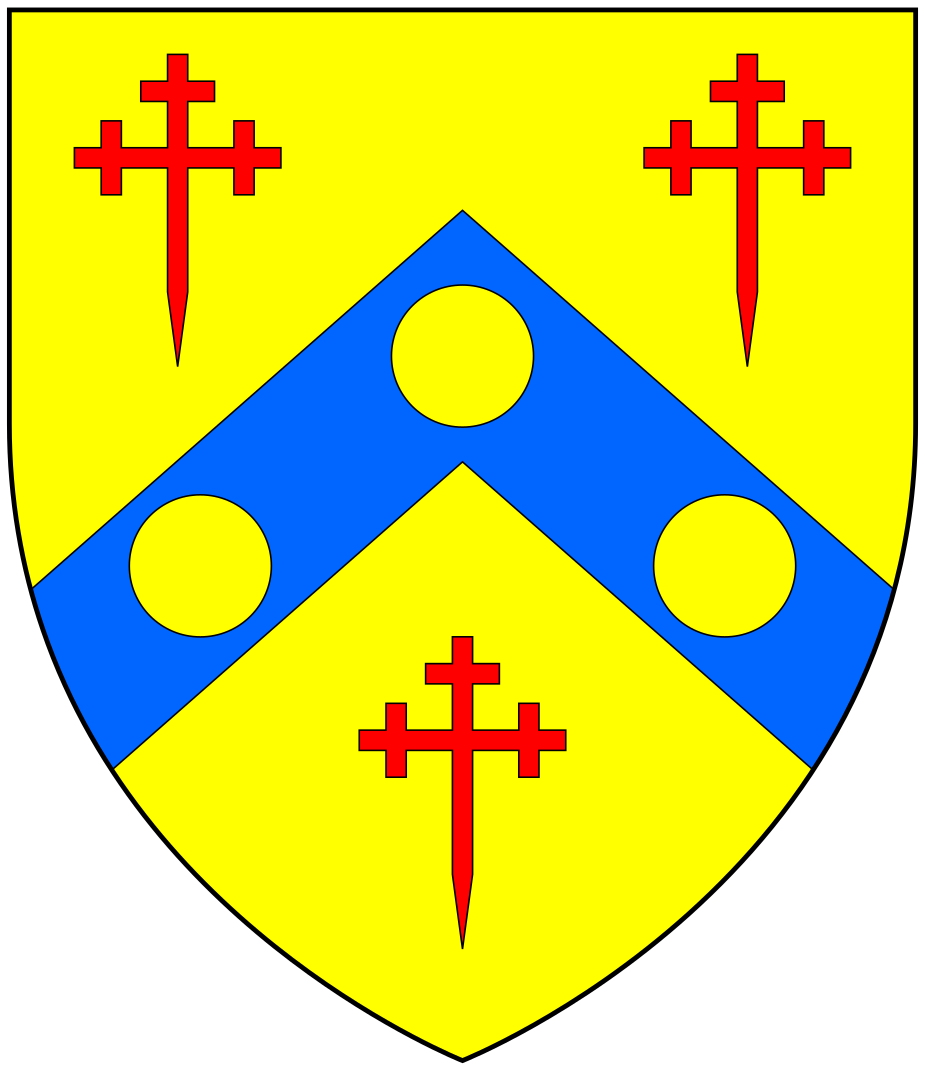
Arms of Crossing of Exeter: Or, on a chevron azure between three crosses crosslet fitchée gules as many bezants

Francis Crossing (1598–1638) of Exeter, Devon, was an English politician who sat in the House of Commons from 1626 to 1629.

Crossing was the son of Hugh Crossing, Mayor of Exeter, by his wife Joane Barret, daughter of John Barret of Barnstaple, Devon. He matriculated at Balliol College, Oxford on 11 May 1615 aged 16. In 1626 he was elected Member of Parliament for Mitchell, Cornwall. He was elected MP for Camelford, Cornwall, in 1628 and sat until 1629 when King Charles I commenced his Personal Rule for eleven years.

Parliament of England
| Preceded by Henry Sandys; Sir John Smith | Member of Parliament for Mitchell; 1626; With: Sir John Smith | Succeeded by Francis Buller; John Sparke |
| Preceded by Edward Lyndley; Sir Thomas Monk | Member of Parliament for Camelford; 1628–1629; With: Evan Edwards | Parliament suspended until 1640 |
