= Anthony Turpin =

Anthony Turpin was an English politician who sat in the House of Commons between 1601 and 1611.

In 1601, Turpin was elected Member of Parliament for Camelford. He was re-elected MP for Camelford in 1604.

Parliament of England
Preceded by Jerome Horsey; Henry Carnesewe	Member of Parliament for Camelford; 1601–1611; With: William Carnesew 1601; John Good 1604–1611	Succeeded by George Cotton; Robert Naunton
