= Thomas Monck =

English politician

Arms of Monck of Potheridge, Devon: Gules, a chevron between three lion's heads erased argent

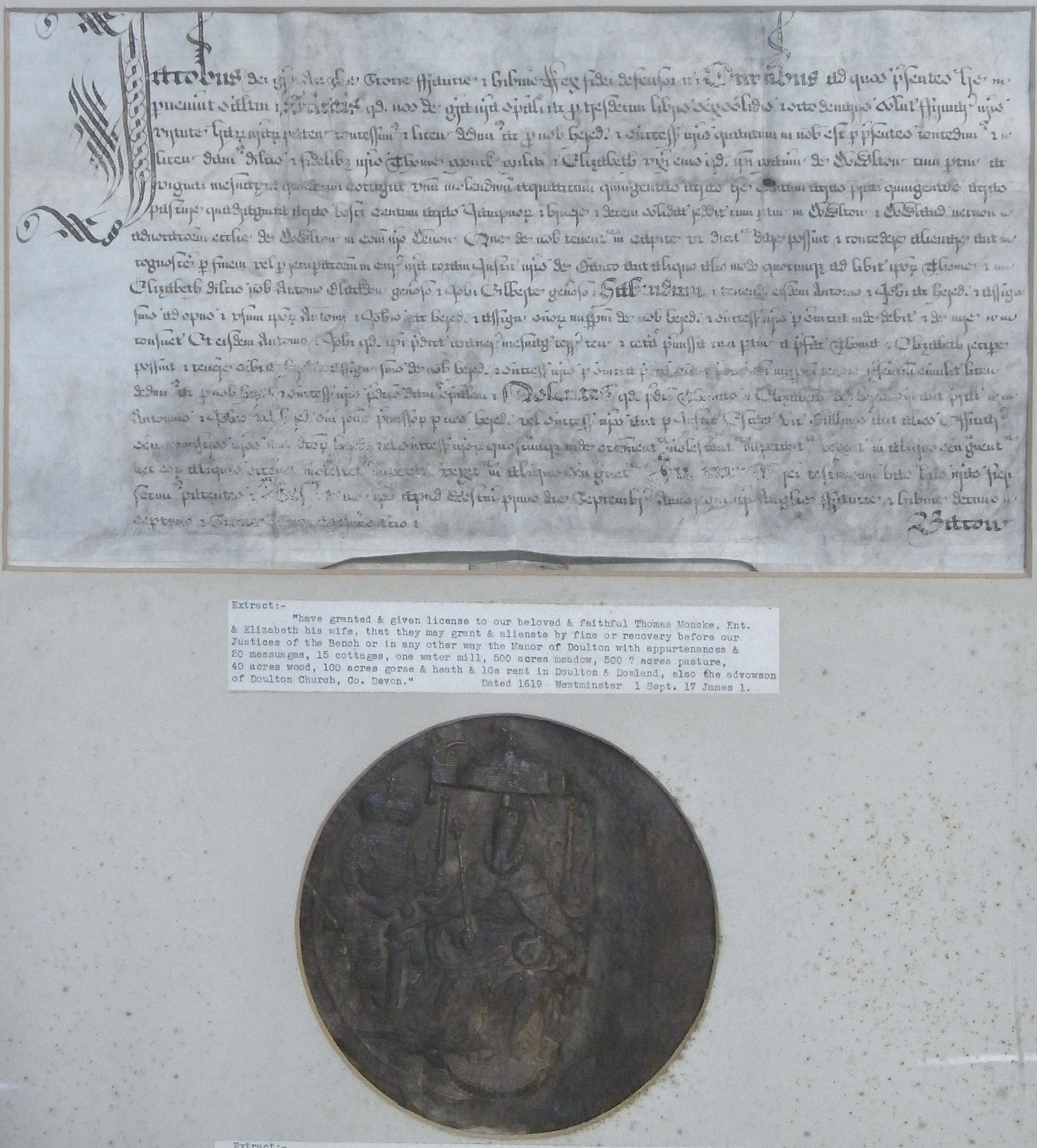
Royal licence to alienate the manor of Dolton granted in 1619 by King James I to Sir Thomas Monck (died 1627) of Potheridge, Devon, and his wife Elizabeth. Great Seal of King James I appended. Displayed in Dolton Church

Sir Thomas Monck (1570 – 1627) (alias Monk, Monke, etc.) of Potheridge in the parish of Merton, Devon, was Member of Parliament for Camelford, Cornwall, in 1626. He was the father of George Monck, 1st Duke of Albemarle (1608–70), KG and of Nicholas Monck (c. 1610–1661), Bishop of Hereford.

== Origins ==
He was the eldest son and heir of Anthony Monke of Potheridge, where his ancestors had been seated for at least 18 generations, by his wife Mary Arscott (d. 1574/5), eldest daughter of Richard Arscott of Ashwater, Devon (a younger son of John Arscott (1469-1541) of Arscott in the parish of Ashwater and a brother of Tristram Arscott (1544-1621) of Annery, Monkleigh).

== Career ==
He was baptised at Ashwater on 9 April 1570. He matriculated at King's College, Cambridge at Easter 1587 and was admitted as a student of law to the Inner Temple in 1590. He was knighted. In 1626 he was elected as a Member of Parliament for Camelford in Cornwall. He died at the age of about 57.

== Marriage and children ==
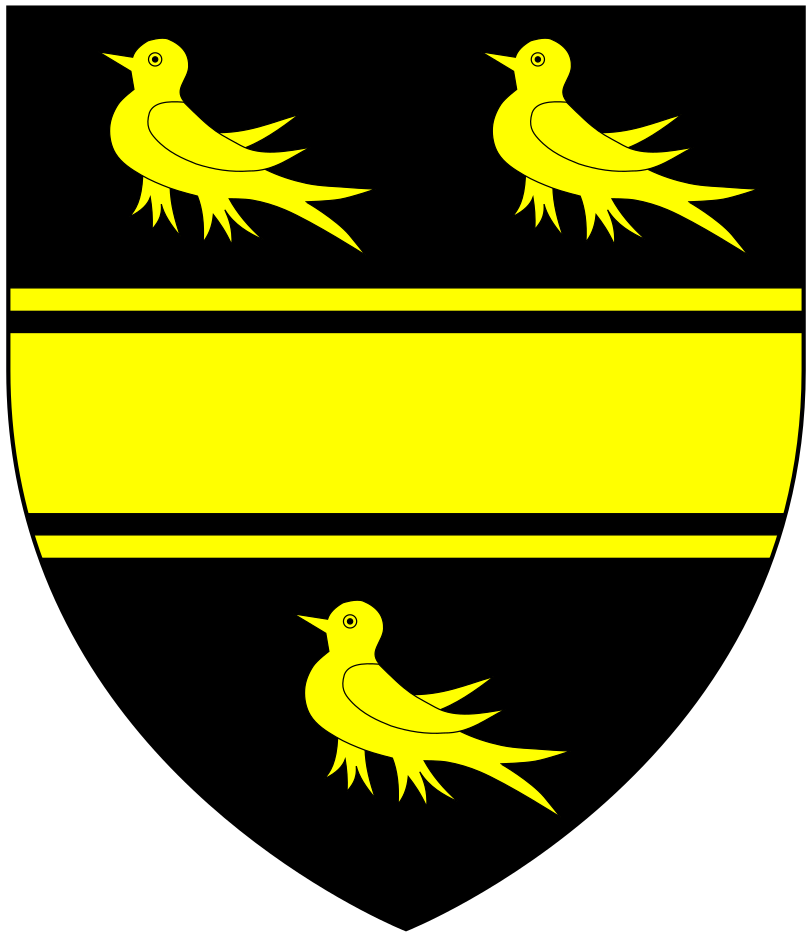
Arms of Smith of Exeter: Sable, a fess cotised between three martlets or

He married Elizabeth Smith, a daughter (by his first marriage) of Sir George Smith (d. 1619) of Madford House, near Exeter, Devon, a merchant who served as a Member of Parliament for Exeter in 1604, was three times Mayor of Exeter and was Exeter's richest citizen, possessing 25 manors. On her marriage Elizabeth received as a dowry from her father lands including the manor of Dolton, in respect of which she and her husband received a royal licence to alienate granted in 1619 by King James I. The charter, with the Great Seal of King James I appended, survives and is displayed in Dolton Church. Elizabeth's half-sister by their father's second marriage was Grace Smith, wife of the heroic Civil War Royalist commander Sir Bevil Grenville (1596-1643) of Bideford in Devon and Stowe, Kilkhampton in Cornwall, killed in action at the Battle of Lansdowne (1643) and mother of John Grenville, 1st Earl of Bath (1628–1701). By his wife Thomas Monck had children including:

- Anthony Monck I, eldest son, died childless before 1620;
- Anthony Monck II, 2nd son, died childless before 1620;
- Col. Thomas Monck (d. 1688), 3rd and eldest surviving son and heir, who married Mary Gould a daughter of William Gould of Hayes. His eldest son and heir apparent was Lt Thomas Monck (d. 1644), lieutenant to his father, who during the Civil War was slain in South Street, Exeter, on the night of 9 July 1644 "through some mistake as to the password", and was buried at Great Torrington near Potheridge. His 2nd son George Monck (1647-1669) died aged 22, also during the Civil War, at Dalkeith House in Scotland, the headquarters of his uncle the Duke of Albemarle.
- George Monck, 1st Duke of Albemarle (1608–1670) KG, 4th son, who assisted by his half-first cousin John Grenville, 1st Earl of Bath (1628–1701) played a pivotal role in effecting the Restoration of the Monarchy in 1660.
- Nicholas Monck (c. 1610–1661), 5th son, Bishop of Hereford. From 1640 he served as Rector of Langtree, a parish near Potheridge, and was given the Rectory of Kilkhampton in Cornwall by his half-cousin Sir John Grenville (later 1st Earl of Bath). After the Restoration of the Monarchy he was appointed by King Charles II as Bishop of Hereford in 1660 and Provost of Eton College. He also played a prominent role in assisting his eminent elder brother in effecting the Restoration.

Parliament of England
Preceded by Sir Henry Hungate; Thomas Cotteel	Member of Parliament for Camelford; 1626; With: Edward Lyndley	Succeeded by Francis Crossing
