= William St. Aubyn =

English politician

William St. Aubyn (by 1526 – 1558/1571), of Mawgan in Meneage, Cornwall, was an English politician.

He was a Member (MP) of the Parliament of England for Helston in April 1554 and November 1554, for West Looe in 1555 and for Camelford in 1558.
