= Edward Williams (died c. 1594) =

English politician

Edward Williams (died c. 1594) was an English politician.

He was a member (MP) of the parliament of England for Camelford in 1571 and for St. Ives in 1572.
