= Arthur Dudley =

Man who claimed to be the son of Elizabeth I

- Born: c.1562 London, England
- Parent(s): Ostensibly Queen Elizabeth I, Robert Dudley

Arthur Dudley was a 16th-century man famous for the controversial claim that he was the son of Queen Elizabeth I and Robert Dudley, a man known to have had a (not necessarily consummated) long love affair with the queen.

== Queen Elizabeth I and Robert Dudley ==
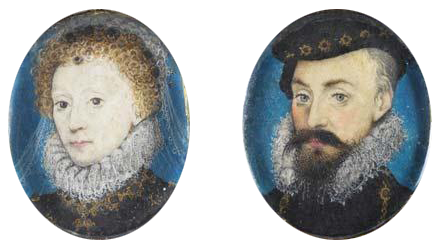
Pair of miniatures of Elizabeth and Leicester, c. 1575, by Nicholas Hilliard. Their friendship lasted for over thirty years, until his death.

In the spring of 1559, it became evident that Elizabeth was in love with her childhood friend Robert Dudley. It was said that Amy Robsart, his wife, was suffering from a "malady in one of her breasts" and that the Queen would like to marry Dudley if his wife should die. By the autumn of 1559, several foreign suitors were vying for Elizabeth's hand; their impatient envoys engaged in ever more scandalous talk and reported that a marriage with her favourite was not welcome in England: "There is not a man who does not cry out on him and her with indignation ... she will marry none but the favoured Robert." Amy Dudley died in September 1560, from a fall from a flight of stairs and, despite the coroner's inquest finding of accident, many people suspected Dudley of having arranged her death so that he could marry the queen. Elizabeth seriously considered marrying Dudley for some time. However, William Cecil, Nicholas Throckmorton, and some conservative peers made their disapproval unmistakably clear. There were even rumours that the nobility would rise if the marriage took place.

Among other marriage candidates being considered for the queen, Robert Dudley continued to be regarded as a possible candidate for nearly another decade. Elizabeth was extremely jealous of his affections, even when she no longer meant to marry him herself. In 1564, Elizabeth raised Dudley to the peerage as Earl of Leicester. He finally remarried in 1578, to which the queen reacted with repeated scenes of displeasure and lifelong hatred towards his wife, Lettice Knollys. Still, Dudley always "remained at the centre of [Elizabeth's] emotional life", as historian Susan Doran has described the situation. He died shortly after the defeat of the Spanish Armada in 1588. After Elizabeth's own death, a note from him was found among her most personal belongings, marked "his last letter" in her handwriting.

== Claim of relation to Elizabeth I ==
A central issue, when it comes to the question of her virginity, was whether Elizabeth ever consummated her love affair with Robert Dudley. In 1559, Elizabeth had Dudley's bedchambers moved next to her own apartments. In 1561, she was mysteriously bedridden with an illness that caused her body to swell.

Years later in 1587, a man calling himself Arthur Dudley was detained by the Spanish after rescue from a shipwreck on the Biscay Coast under suspicion of being a spy.

Taken to Madrid, Dudley claimed to be the son of Queen Elizabeth and Robert Dudley, conceived in 1561, the timing of which would have been consistent with when she was bedridden. Dudley was examined by Francis Englefield, a Catholic aristocrat exiled to Spain and secretary to King Philip II. Three letters exist today describing the interview, detailing what Arthur proclaimed to be the story of his life, from birth in the royal palace to the time of his arrival in Spain.

As told by Arthur, Elizabeth had a governess, Katherine Ashley, whose servant was summoned to the court in 1561 and told to obtain a nurse for the newborn infant of someone at the palace. That servant, Robert Southern, was told to take the boy to London and raise him as one of his own children. That infant, named Arthur, was to be raised as a gentleman. He was indeed raised well, Arthur recounted, and taught music, arms, Classical languages, and dance. A youthful attempt to run away to a life of adventure in his teens was ended when a surprisingly forceful and officious letter demanding his return arrived while he awaited a ship in Wales. He was taken to a palace in London, Pickering Place, meeting John Ashley, who said that it was he, not Arthur's father, who had paid for his upbringing.

Arthur did not return home immediately, but was accommodated in travels between England and France, until years later when his adoptive father was on his deathbed. At that point, Robert Southern confessed Arthur's Royal origins to him, prompting considerable worry that the safety of both of them was jeopardized. After more travel between England and France, Arthur had voyaged to Spain, and in the return had been shipwrecked, he claimed.

However, Dudley's story failed to convince the Spanish: Englefield admitted to the King that Arthur's "claim at present amounts to nothing", but suggested that "he should not be allowed to get away, but [...] kept very secure." The King agreed, and Arthur was never heard from again.

Modern scholarship dismisses the story's basic premise as "impossible", and asserts that Elizabeth's life was so closely observed by contemporaries that she could not have hidden a pregnancy.
