= Lewis Allsopp =

English politician

Member of the British Parliament for Camelford
- In office 17 April 1819 – 16 June 1819

Personal details
- Born: after 1763
- Died: 1835
- Occupation: politician and attorney

Lewis Allsopp (after 1763–1835) was a British Tory politician and attorney who served as the Member of Parliament for Camelford from 17 April to 16 June 1819 . During his brief tenure, he did not make any spoken or written contributions in Parliament. In addition to his parliamentary role, Allsopp served as Solicitor to the Duchy of Cornwall. His parliamentary service is documented in the Hansard records, which detail the proceedings and contributions of MPs.

He also served as Solicitor to the Dutchy of Cornwall.
