= Francis Roscarrock =

16th-century English politician

Francis Roscarrock (fl. 1553–1554) was an English politician.

== Life ==
We know almost nothing of Roscarrock except that he sat in four parliaments. He is described as a 'gentleman', and the Roscarrocks were influential in the area; presumably he was one of the family. The head of the Roscarrocks, Richard Roscarrock, was a knight of the shire at the same time as Francis, representing Cornwall. Francis had a brother, Thomas Roscarrock, who, like Francis, was an MP for Liskeard.

== Career ==
He was a Member (MP) of the Parliament of England for Newport, Cornwall in March 1553, for Camelford in October 1553 and November 1554, and for Liskeard in April 1554.
