= William Say (MP for Camelford) =

English Member of Parliament and one of the regicides of King Charles I

William Say (1604 – c. 1666) was an English member of parliament and one of the regicides of King Charles I.

Say was educated at University College, Oxford and the Middle Temple before being called to the Bar in 1631. In 1647, he was elected as an MP for Camelford.

In January 1649, as a commissioner of the High Court of Justice at the trial of King Charles, he was 48th of the 59 signatories on the death warrant of the King. After the Restoration, Say escaped to Vevey, Switzerland, where he joined Edmund Ludlow.

== See also ==
- List of regicides of Charles I
