= Morice baronets =

Extinct baronetcy in the Baronetage of England

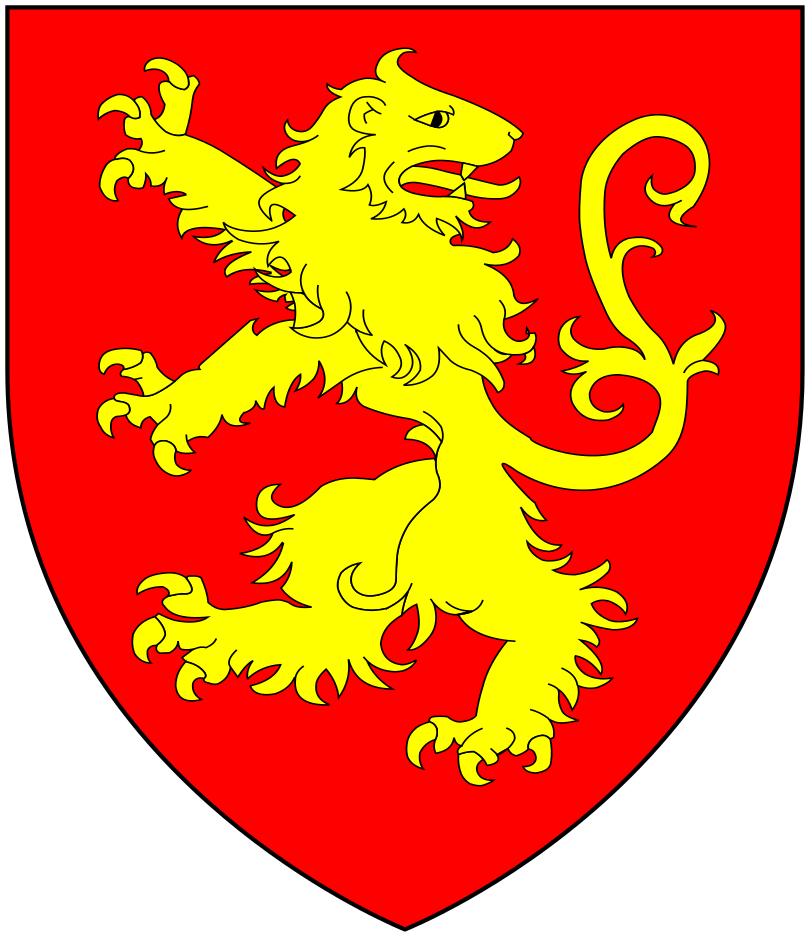
- Escutcheon of the Morice baronets of Werrington
- Creation date: 1661
- Status: extinct
- Extinction date: 1750
- Arms: Gules, a lion rampant reguardant or

The Morice Baronetcy, of Werrington in the County of Devon, was a title in the Baronetage of England.

It was created on 20 April 1661 for William Morrice, subsequently Member of Parliament for Newport (Cornwall). He was the son of Sir William Morice, Secretary of State for the Northern Department. The second Baronet was also Member of Parliament for Newport while the third Baronet represented Newport as well as Launceston. The title became extinct on the latter's death in 1750. William Morice, eldest son of the first Baronet, was Member of Parliament for Newport but predeceased his father.

== Morice baronets, of Werrington (1661) ==
- Sir William Morice, 1st Baronet (c. 1628–1690)
- Sir Nicholas Morice, 2nd Baronet (1681–1726)
- Sir William Morice, 3rd Baronet (c. 1707–1750)
