= Newport Roundhouse =

Municipal building in Newport, Cornwall, England

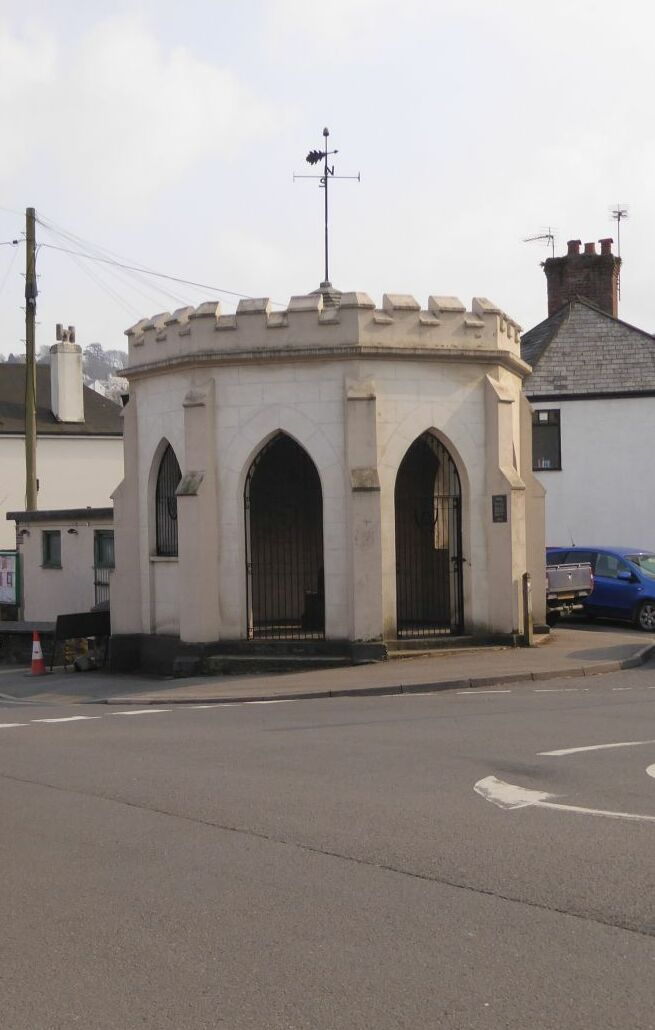
- Newport Roundhouse

- Shown in Cornwall
- 50.6421°N 4.3658°W
- Location: Newport Square, Newport, Cornwall, England

History
- Built: 1829

Site notes
- Architectural style: Gothic Revival style

Listed Building – Grade II
- Official name: The Round House and Base of Medieval Market Cross
- Designated: 13 September 1972
- Reference no.: 1195995

Newport Roundhouse, formerly known as Newport Town Hall, is a municipal building in Newport Square in Newport, Cornwall, England. The structure, which is one of the places in Cornwall where royal proclamations are read out, is a Grade II listed building.

== History ==
The building was commissioned by Hugh Percy, 3rd Duke of Northumberland, whose local seat was at Werrington Manor, to serve as a modest market house for the town, and also to accommodate the remains of the market cross, which was a medieval shaft carved from granite. The site he selected, on the south side of Newport Square, had been occupied by a leather drying loft owned by a local currier, Nicholas Burt.

The building was designed in the Gothic Revival style, built in brick with a stucco finish, and was completed in 1829. The duke was interested in classical architecture and asked for the design to be based on the Tower of the Winds in Athens. The design involved an octagonal structure with a series of buttresses supporting it at the corners. The eight bays featured four arched openings, two openings which were infilled at the bottom, and two openings which were completely infilled. The building was surmounted by a cornice, a castellated parapet, a conical roof and a weather vane. It became known as "the Temple of the Winds".

The building served both as a local market hall and also as the place where parliamentary selection results for the parliamentary constituency of Newport were announced. However, Newport had a very small electorate and a dominant patron, the duke, which meant it was recognised by the UK Parliament as a rotten borough. Its right to elect members of parliament was removed by the Reform Act 1832. By the second half of the 19th century, the building was simply known as "Newport Town Hall".

The building was eventually acquired by the proprietor of the White Horse Inn, Charles Burt, who used it as a shed for the storage of building materials. In the early 1920s, his son, George Burt, decided to give the building to Launceston Town Council. The council concreted over the floor and had three seats installed. An extensive programme of refurbishment works, costing £30,000, as carried out to a design by Parkes Leas Architects in the early 21st century. After the works had been completed the building was officially re-opened in November 2005. The building, which remains under the ownership and management of Launceston Town Council, was one of the places in Cornwall at which the proclamation of King Charles III was read out in September 2022.
