= Richard Grenville (died 1577 or 1578) =

English politician

Richard Grenvill
- Born: by 1524; Stowe, Kilkhampton, Cornwall
- Died: 1577 or 1578
- Occupations: Member of Parliament subsidy collector for the Hundreds of Stratton and Lesnewth
- Parent(s): Digory Grenville and Philippa Grenville

Richard Grenville (by 1524 – 1577 or 1578), of Stowe, Kilkhampton and Penheale, Cornwall, was a politician and Member (MP) of the Parliament of England for the constituency of Newport, Cornwall in 1545 and 1559, and for Dunheved in 1555 and 1563.

Parliament of England
Preceded by ?	Member of Parliament for Newport; 1545–1547; With: Walter Skinner 1545–1547	Succeeded by Reginald Mohun; 1547–1552
Preceded by William Bendlowes; 1554–1555	Member of Parliament for Dunheved; 1555; With: John Kempthorne 1553–1555	Succeeded by Thomas Roper; 1558
Preceded by Thomas Hungate; 1558	Member of Parliament for Newport; 1559; With: Thomas Hickes 1559	Succeeded by George Basset; 1563–1567
Preceded by George Basset; 1559	Member of Parliament for Dunheved; 1563–1567; With: Henry Chiverton 1563–1567	Succeeded by George Grenville; 1571
