= Robert Rolle =

Robert Rolle may refer to:

- Robert Rolle (died 1660) (1622–1660), Member of Parliament for Devon during the Protectorate
- Robert Rolle (died 1710), Member of Parliament for Devon
