= George Courtenay (politician) =

English landowner and Tory politician

George Courtenay (1666–1725), of Ford, Devon, was an English landowner and Tory politician who sat in the English and British House of Commons between 1702 and 1713.

Courtenay was baptized on 13 May 1666, the seventh, but fourth surviving son of Sir William Courtenay, 1st Baronet. He was admitted at Middle Temple in 1684. In November 1688, he joined the Prince of Orange at Exeter. He was an ensign in the 1st Foot Guards in 1689, and was appointed vice-admiral of Devon and Exeter in May 1689, holding the post for the rest of his life. He inherited the estate of Ford from his mother in January 1694.

Courtenay was returned as a Tory Member of Parliament for East Looe at a by-election on 4 February 1702 and voted for the vindication of the Commons actions in impeaching the King's Whig ministers on 26 February 1702. He did not stand at the 1702 English general election.

At the 1708 British general election Courtenay was returned as Tory MP for Totnes. He voted against the impeachment of Henry Sacheverell in 1710. At the 1710 British general election, he was defeated at Ashburton but was returned successfully at Newport by Sir Nicholas Morice, 2nd Baronet. He was listed as a ‘worthy patriot’ who detected the mismanagements of the previous administration and was a member of the October Club. In 1711 he was appointed to a place in the victualling office. He did not stand at the 1713 British general election. He lost his place in the Victualling office in 1714 on the accession of George I.

Courtenay died unmarried before 25 May 1725. He was the brother of Francis Courtenay and Richard Courtenay - both Members of Parliament.

Parliament of England
Preceded by Sir Henry Seymour; Francis Godolphin	Member of Parliament for East Looe; 1702; With: Sir Henry Seymour	Succeeded by Sir Henry Seymour; Sir John Pole
Parliament of Great Britain
Preceded by Sir Humphrey Mackworth; Thomas Coulson	Member of Parliament for Totnes; 1708–1710; With: Sir Edward Seymour, 5th Baronet	Succeeded by Thomas Coulson; Francis Gwyn
Preceded by Sir Nicholas Morice; William Pole	Member of Parliament for Newport (Cornwall); 1710–1713; With: Sir Nicholas Morice	Succeeded by Sir Nicholas Morice; Humphry Morice
