= Sir William Pole, 4th Baronet =

English landowner and Tory politician (1678-1741)

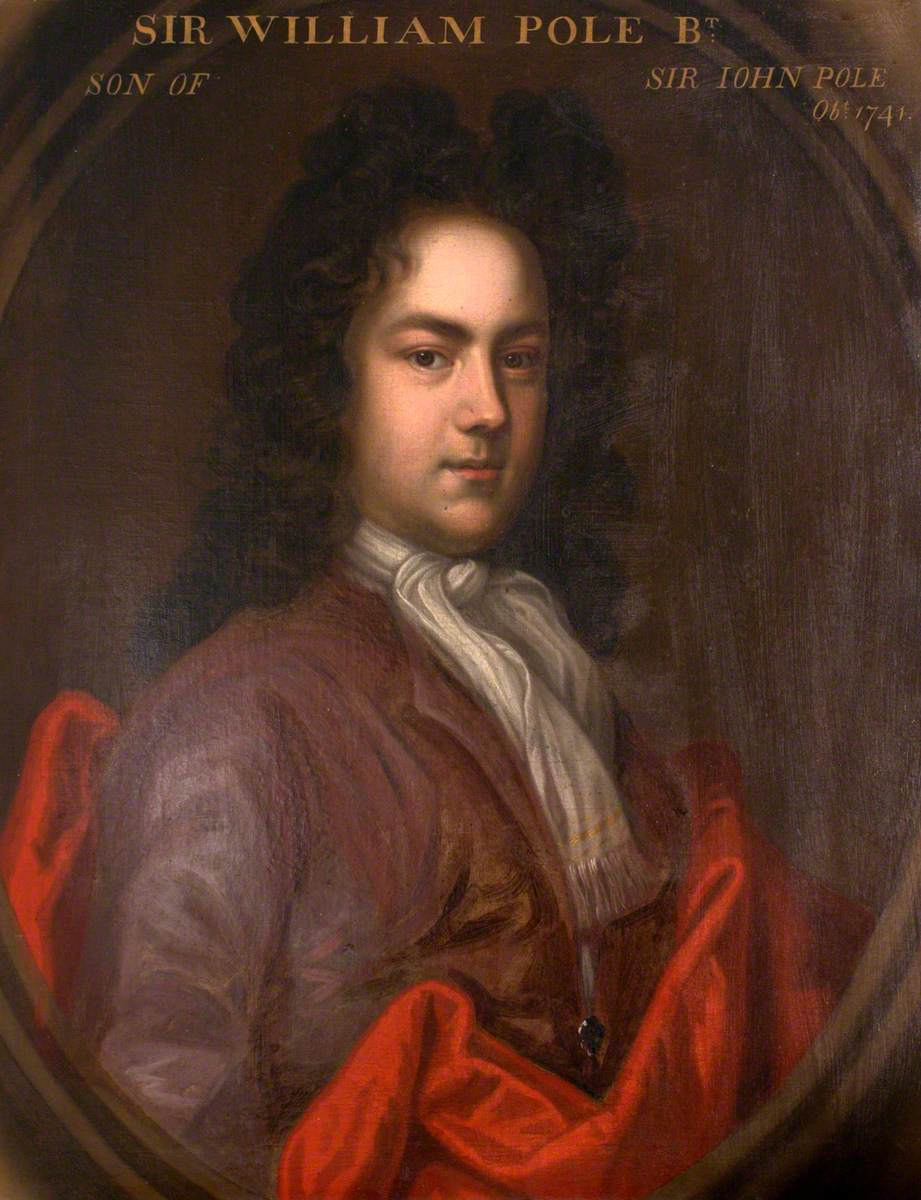

Member of Parliament for Honiton
- In office 1716–1727; 1731–1734

Member of Parliament for Newport
- In office 1708–1710; 1722

Member of Parliament for Bossiney
- In office 1713–1715

Member of Parliament for Devon
- In office 1710–1712

Member of Parliament for Camelford
- In office 1704–1708

Member of Parliament for Newport
- In office 1701–1702

Personal details
- Born: 1678
- Died: 31 December 1741 (aged 62–63)
- Party: Tory
- Spouse: Elizabeth Warry
- Children: 2
- Relatives: William Morice (grandfather)
- Education: New College, Oxford

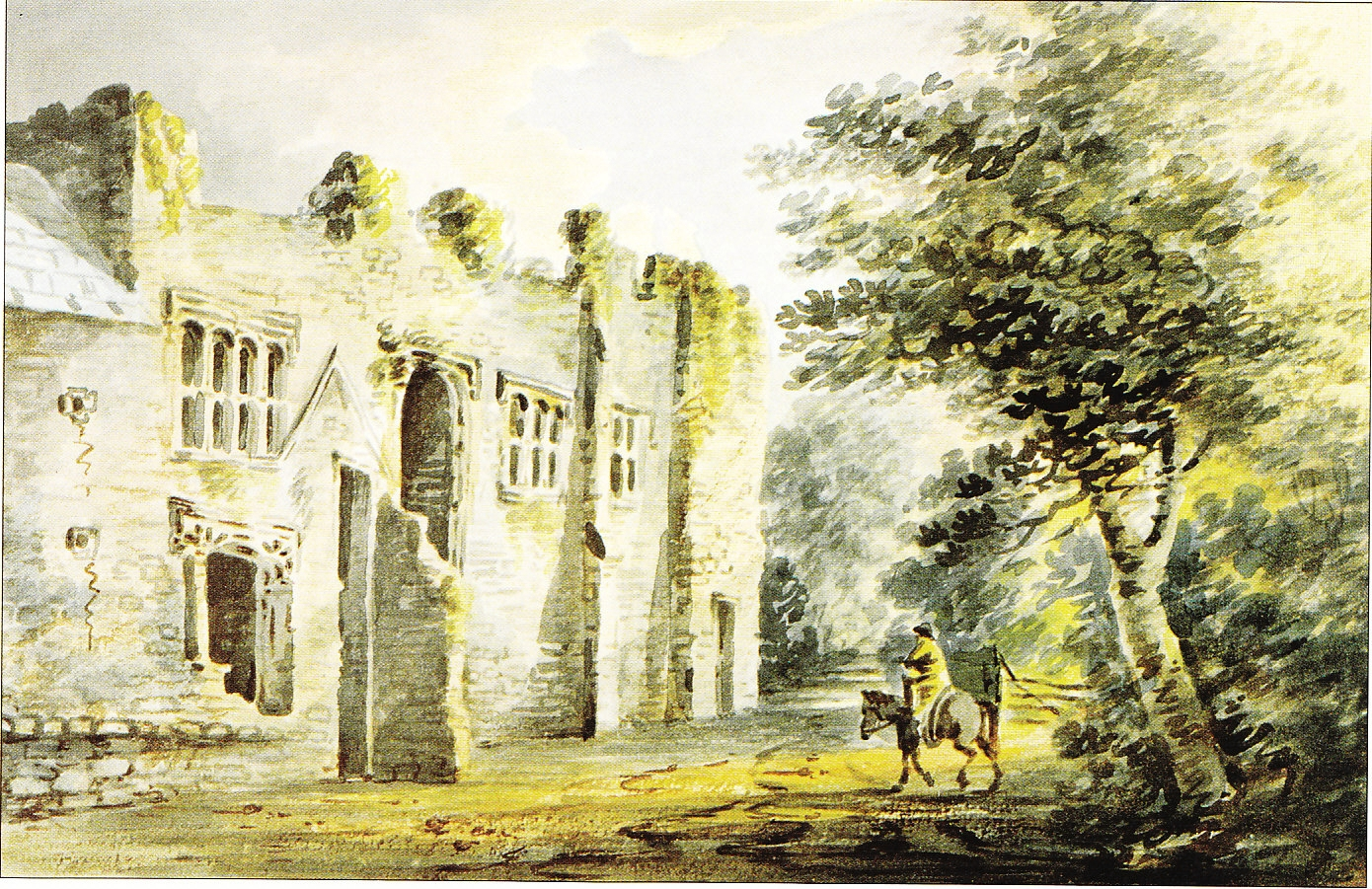
Watercolour of Colcombe Castle, 1795

Sir William Pole, 4th Baronet (1678 – 31 December 1741), of Colcombe Castle, near Colyton and Shute, near Honiton, Devon, was an English landowner and Tory politician who sat in the English and British House of Commons between 1701 and 1734.

== Biography ==
Pole was the eldest son of Sir John Pole, 3rd Baronet MP, and Anne Morice, the daughter of Sir William Morice MP. He matriculated at New College, Oxford on 7 July 1696, aged 18. He succeeded his father in 1708.

Pole was returned unopposed as a Tory Member of Parliament (MP) for Newport on the Morice interest at the second general election of 1701. He supported, on 26 February 1702, the motion vindicating the Commons' proceedings in impeaching the Whig ministers. He was returned as MP for Camelford at a by-election on 17 January 1704 and became a very active member, frequently acting as a teller for the Tories. He voted for the Tack in 1704. At the 1705 English general election, he retained his seat at Camelford and voted against the Court candidate for the Speaker on 25 October 1705. At the 1708 British general election he was returned unopposed again for Newport on the Morice interest. He was less active in the parliament and became a founder-member of the High Tory ‘Board of Brothers’. He voted against the impeachment of Dr Sacheverell. At the 1710 general election he was returned as MP for Devon. He was appointed Master of the Household in 1712 but lost the resulting by-election in July 1712. He was returned unopposed for Bossiney at the 1713 election. On the accession of George I in 1714 he lost his post in the Household.

Pole was elected MP for Honiton at a by-election on 17 March 1716 and was returned again in a contest at the 1722 general election when he was also returned for Newport. He was defeated at Honiton at the 1727 election but was seated on petition on 15 March 1731. He did not stand in 1734. He voted constitently against the administration.

Pole married Elizabeth Warry, the daughter of Robert Warry of Shute, Devon, 'many years' before he made his will in 1733 in which he recommended and requested that his son never stand for Parliament. He died from ‘gout in his stomach’ on 31 December 1741. He was succeeded by his son, John, and also had a daughter.

Parliament of England
Preceded by Francis Stratford; John Prideaux	Member of Parliament for Newport; 1701–1702; With: John Spark	Succeeded by John Spark; Sir Nicholas Morice
Preceded by Henry Manaton; Dennys Glynn	Member of Parliament for Camelford; 1704–1707; With: Dennys Glynn 1704–1705; Henry Pinnell 1705–1707	Succeeded by Parliament of Great Britain
Parliament of Great Britain
Preceded by Parliament of England	Member of Parliament for Camelford; 1707–1708; With: Henry Pinnell	Succeeded by Richard Munden; John Manley
Preceded by Sir Nicholas Morice; Sir John Pole	Member of Parliament for Newport; 1708–1710; With: Sir Nicholas Morice	Succeeded by Sir Nicholas Morice; George Courtenay
Preceded by Sir William Courtenay; Robert Rolle	Member of Parliament for Devon; 1710–1712; With: John Rolle	Succeeded by John Rolle; Sir William Courtenay
Preceded by Henry Campion; John Manley	Member of Parliament for Bossiney; 1713–1715; With: John Manley 1713–1714; Paul Orchard 1714–1715	Succeeded by Henry Cartwright; Samuel Molyneux
Preceded by Sir William Yonge; Sir William Courtenay	Member of Parliament for Honiton; 1716–1727; With: Sir William Yonge	Succeeded by Sir William Yonge; James Sheppard
Preceded by Sir Nicholas Morice; Humphry Morice	Member of Parliament for Newport; 1722; With: Sir Nicholas Morice	Succeeded by Sir Nicholas Morice; John Morice
Preceded by Sir William Yonge; James Sheppard	Member of Parliament for Honiton; 1731–1734; With: Sir William Yonge	Succeeded by Sir William Yonge; William Courtenay
Political offices
Preceded by Edmund Dunch	Master of the Household; 1712–1714	Succeeded by Edmund Dunch
Baronetage of England
Preceded by John Pole	Baronet of Shute House; 1708–1741	Succeeded by John Pole
