= Nicholas Trefusis =

English politician

Arms of Trefusis: Argent, a chevron between three spindles sable

Nicholas Trefusis (died c. 1648) was an English politician who sat in the House of Commons of England variously between 1628 and 1648.

== Origins ==
Nicholas Trefusis was the last of the line of a branch of the Trefusis family living at Lezant in Cornwall. The Trefusis family originated at the manor of Trefusis in the parish of Mylor, near Falmouth, in Cornwall. The present representative of the Trefusis family is Baron Clinton, of Heanton Satchville, Huish, Devon, the largest private landowner in Devon.

== Career ==
Trefusis was elected as Member of Parliament for Newport in Cornwall in 1628 and held the seat until 1629 when King Charles I decided to rule without parliament. In April 1640 Trefusis was re-elected as MP for Newport for the Short Parliament. In 1646 was elected as MP for Cornwall as a replacement in the Long Parliament for Royalists who had lost their lives, but was excluded in Pride's Purge in 1648. Trefusis made his will in 1647.

== Marriages and children ==
He married and had two daughters.

Parliament of England
Preceded by Sir Henry Hungate; Thomas Williams	Member of Parliament for Newport; 1628–1629; With: Piers Edgcumbe (after William Killigrew chose to represent Penryn instead)	Parliament suspended until 1640
Vacant Parliament suspended since 1629	Member of Parliament for Newport; 1640–1641; With: John Maynard 1640; Paul Speccot 1640	Succeeded by Richard Edgcumbe; John Maynard (Maynard sat for Totnes-seat then vacant)
Preceded by Sir Bevil Grenville; Alexander Carew	Member of Parliament for Cornwall; 1646–1648; With: Hugh Boscawen	Succeeded by Robert Bennet; Francis Langdon; Anthony Rous; John Bawden
