= Humphry Morice =

Humphry Morice may refer to:

- Humphry Morice (Governor of the Bank of England) (c. 1671 – 1731), British merchant
- Humphry Morice (MP for Launceston) (1723–1785), British politician
