= Walter Skinner (MP) =

16th-century English politician

Walter Skinner (born by 1515, living 1554) was an English politician.

Skinner was one of the two members of the parliament of England for Newport, Cornwall in 1545.

Parliament of England
Preceded by ?	Member of Parliament for Newport; 1545–1547; With: Richard Grenville 1545–1547	Succeeded by James Trewynnard; 1547–1552
