= Sir William Morice, 1st Baronet =

English Member of Parliament

Member of Parliament for Newport
- In office 1689-1690

Personal details
- Born: c. 1628
- Died: 7 February 1690 (aged 61–62)
- Spouse(s): Gertrude Bampfylde Elizabeth Reynell (m. 1676)
- Children: William Morice; Mary Morice; Gertrude Morice; Sir Nicholas Morice, 2nd Baronet
- Parent: William Morice (father)
- Relatives: William Morice (grandson)

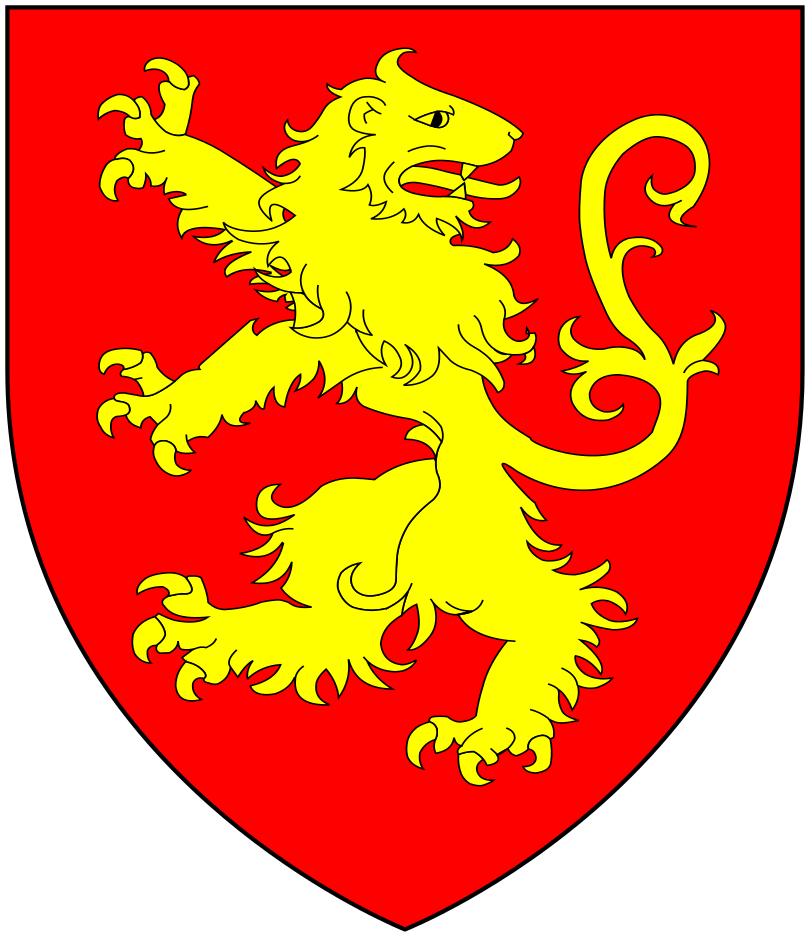
Arms of Morice of Werrington, Devon: Gules, a lion rampant reguardant or

Sir William Morice, 1st Baronet (c. 1628 – 7 February 1690), of Werrington (then in Devon but now in Cornwall), was an English Member of Parliament.

== Origins ==
Morice was the eldest son of Sir William Morice, a Member of Parliament who assisted in the Restoration of King Charles II, and was knighted and appointed Secretary of State for the Northern Department in 1660.

== Career ==
The younger William was created a baronet on 20 April 1661. In 1689, he entered the House of Commons as Member of Parliament (MP) for Newport, in Cornwall, but died a year later.

== Marriages and children ==
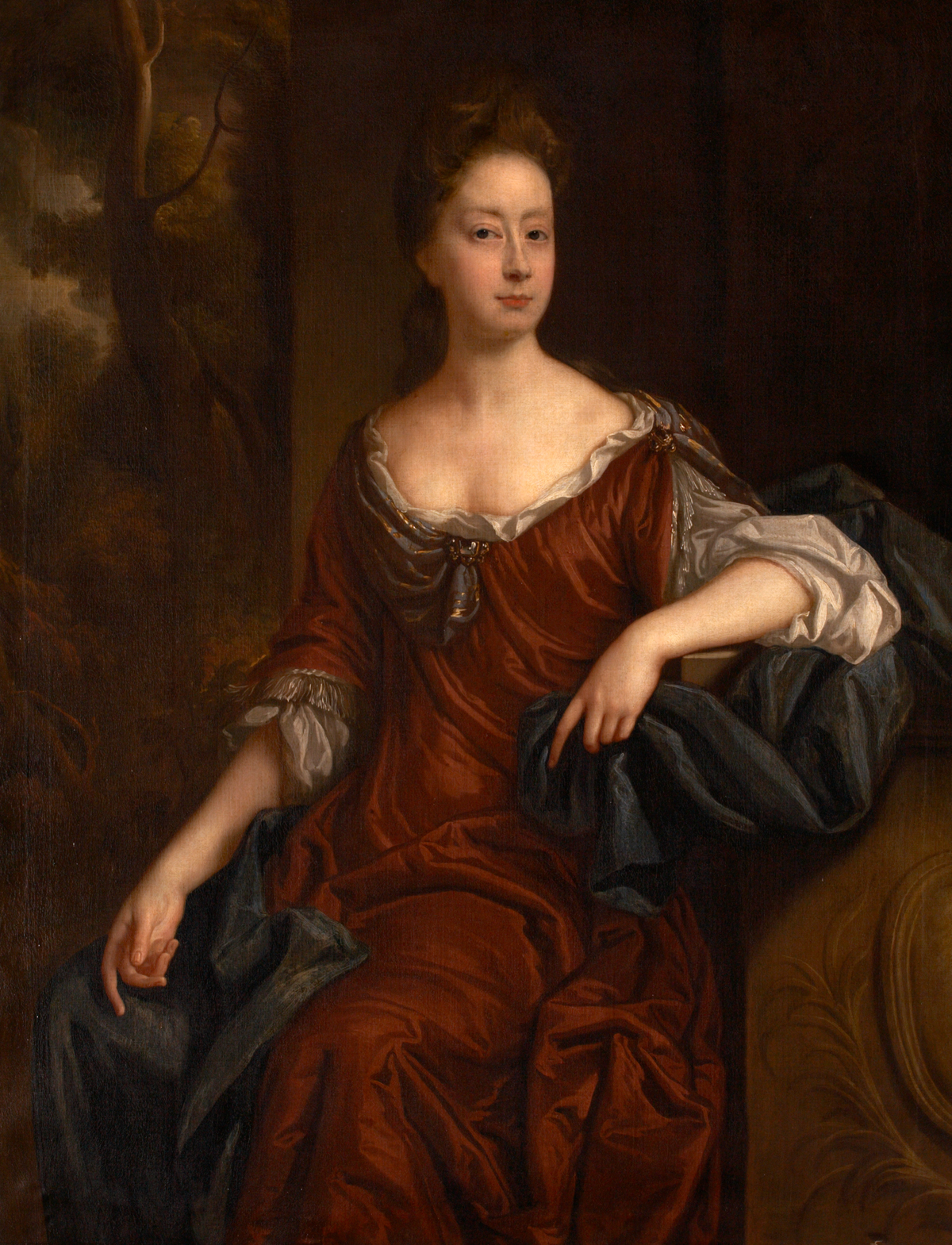
Mary Morice (d. 1698), daughter of Sir William Morice, 1st Baronet (c. 1628–1690) of Werrington, Devon, and 3rd wife of Sir John Carew, 3rd Baronet (1635–1692) of Antony. Painted by John Riley, c. 1682, Collection of Antony House, National Trust

He married twice:

- Firstly to Gertrude Bampfylde, daughter of Sir John Bampfylde, 1st Baronet of Poltimore and North Molton in Devon, by whom he had three children:
  - William Morice (1660–1688) who married Anne Lower, and predeceased his father without issue.
  - Mary Morice, who married (as his 3rd wife) Sir John Carew, 3rd Baronet (1635–1692) of Antony, Cornwall.
  - Gertrude Morice (d. 1679), who married Sir Walter Yonge, 3rd Baronet
- Secondly he married in 1676 Elizabeth Reynell, 4th daughter of Thomas Reynell (d. 1698) of East Ogwell, Devon, MP for Devon in 1656 and MP for Ashburton 1658 and Sheriff of Devon 1677. By her he was the father of:
  - Sir Nicholas Morice, 2nd Baronet (1690–1715).

== Sources ==
- Morice genealogy
- Concise Dictionary of National Biography (1930)

Parliament of England
Preceded by William Morice and John Speccot	Member of Parliament for Newport; 1689–1690 (with John Speccot)	Succeeded by John Morice and Charles Cheyne
Baronetage of England
New creation	Baronet (of Werrington); 1661–1690	Succeeded by Nicholas Morice
