= John Leigh (died 1612) =

English landowner, soldier and politician

Sir John Leigh (1575 – January 1612) was an English landowner, soldier and politician who sat in the House of Commons between 1597 and 1611.

Leigh was the son of John Leigh of Coldrey, Hampshire and his wife Margaret or Margery Saunders, daughter of Thomas Saunders of Uxbridge, Middlesex. His father died on 20 January 1576 when he was a year old and he succeeded to the manors of Coldrey, Chauntsinger near Alton, Medstead, Alresford and Bishops Sutton in Hampshire. He was J.P. for Hampshire from 1592. He served in the army at Cadiz, where he was knighted by the Earl of Essex in 1596. In 1597, he was elected Member of Parliament for Grampound. He went with the Earl of Essex to Ireland in April 1599 as captain of 50 horse, but returned to England in the autumn. He was not involved in the 1601 rebellion. Instead in 1601 he was elected MP for Newport in Cornwall. In 1604 he was elected MP for Helston.

Leigh died of "the stone" at the age 36 "after a lingering sickness".

Leigh married Elizabeth West, daughter of Sir Thomas West, of Testwood, Hampshire and had a son Thomas.

Parliament of England
Preceded by Richard Edgcumbe; Edward Jones	Member of Parliament for Grampound; 1597; With: Robert Newdigate	Succeeded by Sir John Gray; John Astell
Preceded by Morgan Coleman; Edward Lewknor	Member of Parliament for Newport; 1601; With: Tobie Matthew	Succeeded by Sir Robert Killigrew; Sir Edward Seymour
Preceded by William Twysden; Hannibal Vyvyan	Member of Parliament for Helston; 1604–1611; With: John Bogans 1604–1606	Succeeded by Sir Robert Killigrew; Henry Bulstrode
