= Paul Speccot =

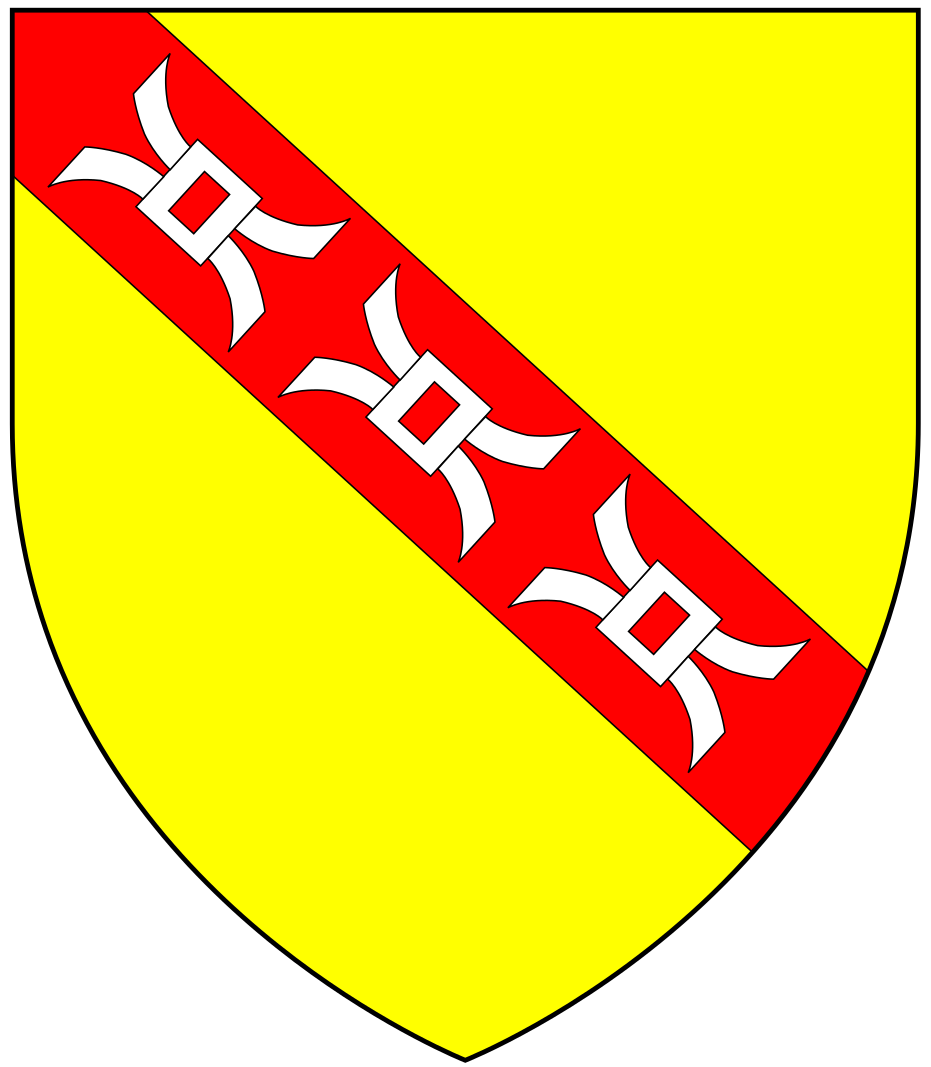
Arms of Speccot: Or, on a bend gules three millrinds argent

Paul Speccot (died 1643) of Penheale in the parish of Egloskerry in Cornwall, was a Member of Parliament successively for Bossiney, East Looe and Newport all in Cornwall, between 1626 and 1640.

== Origins ==
He was the second son of Sir John Speccot (c.1561-1644) of Speccot in the parish of Merton, Devon, and of Penheale in Cornwall, a Member of Parliament for St Mawes in Cornwall from 1604, Sheriff of Cornwall in 1622/3, Sheriff of Devon 1614/15, feudal baron of Great Torrington in Devon and lord of the manor of Holsworthy in Devon. His mother (his father's first wife) was Elizabeth Edgcumbe, daughter of Peter Edgcumbe of Mount Edgcumbe in Cornwall. His elder brother was Peter Speccot (died 1655) of Thornbury and Speccot, MP for Tregony in Cornwall in 1624.

== Career ==
In 1626 Speccot was elected as a Member of Parliament for Bossiney in Cornwall. In 1628 he was elected MP for East Looe in Cornwall. In April 1640 he was elected MP for Newport in Cornwall, in the Short Parliament.

== Marriages ==
Speccot married twice:

- Firstly to Grace Halswell (died 1636), daughter of Robert Halswell of Somerset, by whom he had children:
  - John Speccot (died 1677/8), son and heir, of Penheale, MP for Newport 1661–1678. He was buried in Egloskerry Church, where survives his monument. In 1663/4 he married Honor Eliot (died 1692), daughter of John Eliot of Port Eliot in the parish of St Germans, Cornwall, ancestor of the Earl of St Germans. He had three sons and one daughter:
    - Paul Speccot (died 1671/2), who died young.
    - John Speccot (died 1705), MP for Newport 1685–95 and for Cornwalll 1695–1701, who died without children, having married Lady Essex Robartes (died 1689), daughter of John Robartes, 1st Earl of Radnor (1606–1685).
    - Humphrey Speccot (died 1705/6), died unmarried.
    - Dorothy Speccot, wife of John Beaumont.
  - Elizabeth Speccot, wife of Rev. Richard Long. She was the eventual heiress of Penheale on failure of her brother's male descendants.
- Secondly he married Dorothy Wise, daughter of Christopher Wise of Totnes, Devon, who survived him and in 1647 remarried to Henry Wills.

== Death and burial ==
Speccot died in 1643 and was buried at Egloskerry where he left £700 for the curate.

Parliament of England
Preceded by Sir Francis Cottington; Jonathan Prideaux	Member of Parliament for Bossiney; 1626; With: The Lord Lambart	Succeeded by The Lord Lambart; Richard Edgcumbe
Preceded by Sir James Bagge; John Trevor	Member of Parliament for East Looe; 1628–1629; With: William Murray	Parliament suspended until 1640
Preceded by Nicholas Trefusis; John Maynard	Member of Parliament for Newport; 1640; With: Nicholas Trefusis	Succeeded by Richard Edgecumbe; John Maynard
