= Robert Browne (by 1533 – 1565 or later) =

English politician

Robert Browne (by 1533 – 1565 or later), of Launceston, Cornwall, was an English politician.

== Career ==
He was a member (MP) of the parliament of England for Newport, Cornwall in November 1554.
