= Morgan Coleman =

(b.c.1556) of Gray's Inn and St. Mary Aldermanbury, London

Morgan Coleman (or Colman, c.1556 - ?, fl. 1582 - 1622) was an English MP, secretary and historian, who represented the Cornish constituency of Newport Iuxta Launceston in the 1597-1598 Parliament.

== Biography ==
Coleman was born around 1556 in Calais, then an English territory, and was educated at Hart Hall, Oxford, being matriculated in 1582, and Gray's Inn. He married Mirabilia Bourne in February 1585.

Coleman served Sir William Pelham, John Wolley, Lord Willoughby, John Puckering, Thomas Egerton, and Robert Cecil as well as later becoming a member of the Royal Household.

In 1592, Coleman produced several genealogical manuscripts (written and decorated by others) for presentation to Francis Bacon and probably to Lord Burghley and others, apparently to showcase his skills as an antiquarian writer and gain favour.

The next year, Coleman applied to the position of Norroy King of Arms, but the office was given to William Segar.

Coleman was returned as MP for the rotten borough of Newport Iuxta Launceston to the 9th Parliament of Elizabeth I, apparently due to George Carew, at that time the MP for St Germans and a fellow servant of Thomas Egerton. Between 1601 and 1604, Coleman was imprisoned in Fleet Prison for defaulting on his debt, though he remained in Egerton's employment.

He became unpopular at court in 1611 when he suggested reducing the expenditure of the Royal Household which "rendered him hateful to all".

The last record of Coleman is in August 1622 when he was employed as a genealogist by James I. No information on his death or will is known.

Parliament of England
Preceded by Richard Stephens; Emmanuel Chamond	Member of Parliament for Newport Iuxta Launceston; 1597-1598; With: Edward Lewknor	Succeeded by Tobie Matthew; John Leigh
