= William Smith (fl. 1553–54) =

English politician

William Smith (fl. 1553–54) was an English politician.

== Life ==
Due to the popularity of his name, Smith has not been identified.

== Career ==
He was a member (MP) of the parliament of England for Newport, Cornwall October 1553 and Chippenham in April 1554.
