= Piers Edgecumbe =

English politician

Member of Parliament for Newport
- In office 1628-1629; 1662-1667

High Sheriff of Cornwall
- In office 1660

Member of Parliament for Camelford
- In office April 1640 - January 1644

Personal details
- Born: c. 1609
- Died: 6 January 1667 (aged 51)
- Spouse: Mary Glanville (m. 1636)
- Children: Richard Edgcumbe
- Parent: Richard Edgecumbe (father)

Piers Edgecumbe (c. 1609 – 6 January 1667) was an English politician who sat in the House of Commons between 1640 and 1644 and between 1662 and 1667. He supported the Royalist side in the English Civil War.

== Biography ==
Edgecumbe was the son of Sir Richard Edgecumbe and his wife Mary Cottle, daughter of Sir Thomas Cottle of London.

In 1628 Edgecumbe was elected Member of Parliament for Newport until 1629 when King Charles I decided to rule without parliament. In April 1640, Edgecumbe was elected MP for Camelford in the Short Parliament and was returned again for the Long Parliament until he was disabled in January 1644. After the Restoration, Edgecumbe was appointed High Sheriff of Cornwall in 1660 and re-elected MP for Newport in 1662, holding the seat until his death in 1667.

Edgecumbe died at the age of 51 and the inscription on his monument stated he "was a master of languages and sciences; a lover of the King and Church which he endeavoured to support, in the time of the Civil Wars, to the utmost of his power and fortune."

Edgecumbe married Mary Glanville, second daughter of Sir John Glanville of Broad Hinton in 1636, at St. Dunstan's Church, London. Their son was Sir Richard Edgcumbe, MP.

Parliament of England
Preceded by Henry Hungate; Thomas Williams	Member of Parliament for Newport; 1628–1629; With: William Killigrew 1628; Nicholas Trefusis 1628–1629	Parliament suspended until 1640
Vacant Parliament suspended since 1629	Member of Parliament for Camelford; 1640–1644; With: Edward Reade 1640; William Glanville 1640–1644	Succeeded by William Say; Gregory Clement
Preceded by Sir Francis Drake	Member of Parliament for Newport; 1662–1667; With: John Speccot 1661–1668	Succeeded by Nicholas Morice
