= Richard Prideaux =

English politician

Sir Richard Prideaux MP

Member of Parliament for Bodmin
- In office 1640–1640

Personal details
- Born: 1606 Thuborough
- Died: 1667 (aged 61)
- Children: Jonathon Prideaux (1646–1710)
- Parent: Jonathan Prideaux (d. 1637)
- Education: Exeter College, Oxford

Sir Richard Prideaux (1606–1667) was an English politician who sat in the House of Commons in 1640.

Prideaux was the son of Jonathan Prideaux (d. 1637), of Theuborough, now known as Thuborough, in the parish of Sutcombe, Devon. He enrolled at Exeter College, Oxford, on 13 December 1622, aged 16. He lived at Theuborough. In April 1640, he was elected Member of Parliament for Bodmin in the Short Parliament. He fought as a Royalist in the English Civil War, and was compounded for his estate £426 in 1649. At the Stuart Restoration in 1660, he was appointed Vice-Warden of the Stannaries and surveyor-general of the Duchy of Cornwall.

Prideaux died at the age of 61.

Parliament of England
Vacant Parliament suspended since 1629	Member of Parliament for Bodmin; 1640 (April); With: Sir Richard Wynn	Succeeded by John Arundell; Anthony Nicholl
