= Humphry Morice (governor of the Bank of England) =

British merchant (c.1671–1731)

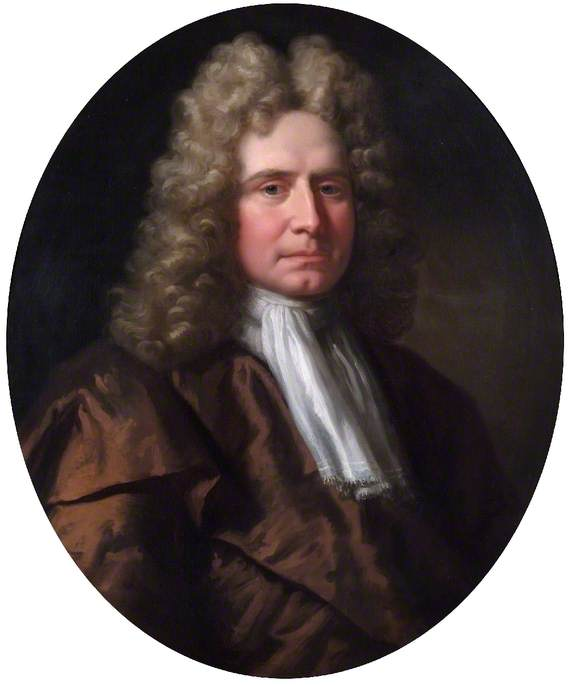
A painting of Humphry Morice by Godfrey Kneller

Humphry Morice (c. 1671 – 16 November 1731) was an English merchant, politician and slave trader who served as the governor of the Bank of England. He inherited his father's trading business around the age of eighteen, and learned finance and speculation from an uncle. Placed in Parliament through a cousin's interest in 1713, his Whig politics ultimately provoked a breach with his Tory cousin, and he had to be given another seat in 1722 by Robert Walpole's administration. He rose to be Deputy Governor and then Governor of the Bank of England in 1727, but unknown to his contemporaries, his fortune was largely fictitious and he was embezzling from the Bank and his daughters' trust fund. He died suddenly in 1731, perhaps having poisoned himself to forestall the discovery of his frauds, and left behind enormous debts.

== Antecedents and trade ==
Humphry was the only son of Humphry Morice (c. 1640–1696), a London merchant trading extensively in Africa, America, Holland and Russia, and his wife Alice, the daughter of Sir Thomas Trollope, 1st Baronet. Because of the early death of his mother, the young Humphry was raised at Werrington, the seat of his uncle Sir William Morice, 1st Baronet. He succeeded his father in his mercantile business in 1689. His father's will left him in the guardianship of his two uncles, John and Nicholas. The latter was a skilled financial speculator, who involved and trained Humphry in that business. On 26 June 1704, Humphry married Judith Sandes (d. 1720), the daughter of a London merchant, by whom he had three daughters who survived him; Elizabeth, later married her stepbrother Paggen Hale, while Judith married George Lee.

Morice's mercantile business was extensive: he was one of four creditors for £18,000 of another merchant gone bankrupt in 1707, and he owned over £4,000 of Bank of England stock in 1710, making him eligible to become a director of the institution. Morice did, in fact, become a director in 1716, and continued to hold that office, He was also involved with the launch of the South Sea Company, acting as a commissioner for subscriptions in 1711. Morice several times testified on trade subjects before Parliament: in 1707 on losses in the West Indian trade due to the lack of convoys, and in 1710 and 1713 in favour of dismantling the Royal African Company's monopoly on West African trade. In light of his activity and wealth, he not unnaturally wished to enter Parliament.

In 1715, Morice commissioned the merchantman Whydah Gally, and the following year appointed Dutch buccaneer Lawrence Prince as its captain. The ship was designed to participate in the triangular trade between Europe, Africa and the Americas, and participated in her maiden voyage in 1716. The next year, the Whydah Gally was navigating the Windward Passage between Cuba and Hispaniola when she was attacked and captured by pirates led by Samuel Bellamy, who made the ship his flagship. After numerous attacks on merchantmen, Bellamy sailed her to Cape Cod where she wrecked on the shoals of Wellfleet on 26 April 1717. The governor of Massachusetts Bay, Samuel Shute, commissioned cartographer Cyprian Southack to recover anything of value from the wreck of the Whydah Gally; but, as Southack expressed with great exasperation in a number of letters to Shute, continuing storms and intense hostility from the local settlements prevented the recovery of anything valuable.

== Parliamentary career ==
Humphry's cousin Sir Nicholas had succeeded to the Werrington estate baronetcy in 1690, and with it a very strong electoral interest the boroughs of Launceston and Newport. Humphry asked Nicholas to put him into Parliament in 1710, but as all his seats were already promised, Humphry did not enter the House of Commons until 1713, sitting with Nicholas for Newport.

Unlike the Tory Nicholas, Humphry leaned towards the Whigs, and voted in 1714 against the expulsion of Sir Richard Steele from Parliament for advocating the Hanoverian succession in a pamphlet. His recorded Parliamentary activity shows a continued interest in the African trade. Humphry "appeared in a most splendid manner at court" to celebrate the birthday of the new Prince of Wales in late 1714, considerably irritating his cousin. Nonetheless, Nicholas again put Humphry in for Newport at the 1715 election.

The bond between the two was violently strained in 1716, when Humphry, after giving Nicholas to understand that he opposed the Septennial Act, voted for it instead. Humphry followed Robert Walpole into opposition to the government the following year, and for the time being, both he and Nicholas were opponents of the sitting ministry. However, on Walpole's return to the cabinet in 1720, he recruited Humphry to whip the London Whigs for crucial votes. Nicholas ran out of patience, and rather brusquely informed Humphry to look to Walpole for a seat, as he would not be returning him for Newport at the next election.

Walpole was, in fact, willing to do so, and arranged through Lord Falmouth to have Morice returned for Grampound in 1722, and again in 1727. Meanwhile, Morice's wife had died in 1720, and on 5 June 1722, he married Catherine, daughter of Peter Paggen of Wandsworth, Surrey, and widow of William Hale. They had two sons, Humphry (1723–1785) and Nicholas (d. 1748).

== Embezzlement and death ==
Morice served as Deputy Governor of the Bank of England from 1725 to 1726, and as Governor from 1727 to 1729. During this period, he defrauded the bank of £29,000 by presenting fictitious bills of exchange for discounting by the Bank. He died suddenly on 16 November 1731, possibly of gout, but he was widely believed to have poisoned himself to forestall exposure. After his death, the enormous extent of his defalcations was revealed: he had not only swindled the Bank, but abstracted money from a trust fund left for his daughters by their maternal uncle, and still left debts of nearly £150,000. The Bank took action against his widow to attempt to recover its losses, ultimately settling for £12,000 after forty-three years of litigation.

== See also ==
- DNB article at Wikisource

Parliament of Great Britain
Preceded by Sir Nicholas Morice; George Courtenay	Member of Parliament for Newport; 1713–1722; With: Sir Nicholas Morice	Succeeded by Sir Nicholas Morice; Sir William Pole
Preceded by Hon. John West; Richard West	Member of Parliament for Grampound; 1722–1731; With: Marquess of Hartington 1722–1727; Philip Hawkins 1727–1731	Succeeded by Philip Hawkins; Isaac le Heup
