= Richard Edgcumbe (died 1639) =

English politician

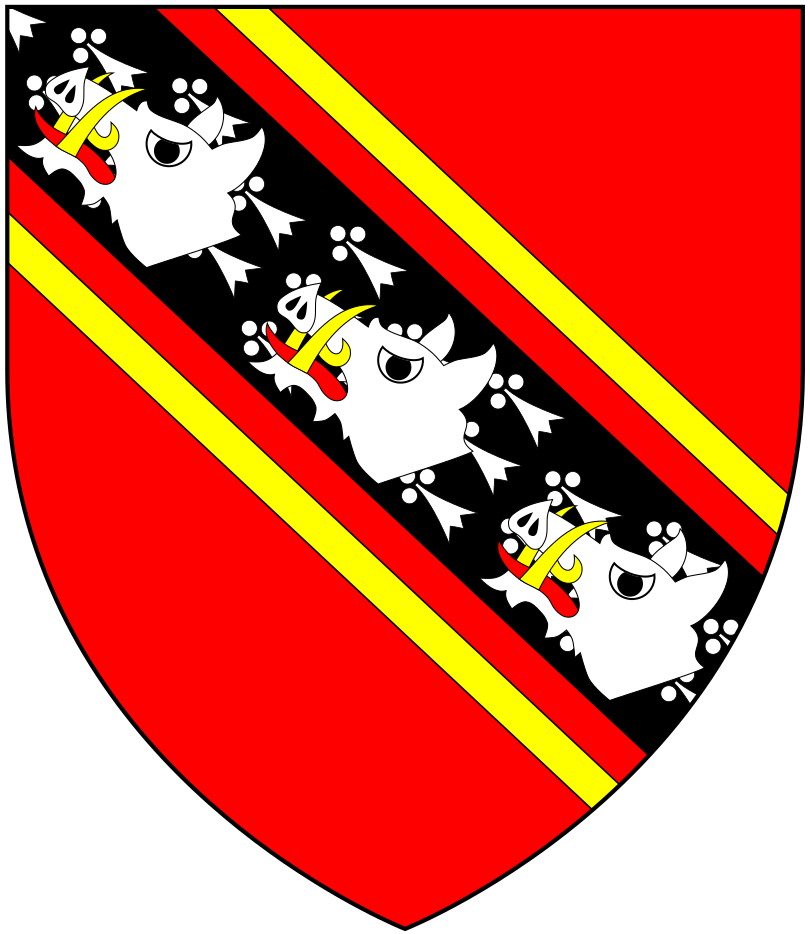
- Arms of Edgcumbe: Gules, on a bend ermines cotised or three boar's heads couped argent

Member of Parliament for Bossiney
- In office 1628-1629

Member of Parliament for Grampound
- In office 1593; 1624

Member of Parliament for Bodmin
- In office 1614

Member of Parliament for Totnes
- In office 1589

Member of Parliament for Liskeard
- In office 1586

Personal details
- Born: c. 1570
- Died: 23 March 1639 (aged 68–69)
- Spouse(s): Anne Carey (m. 1602) Mary Coteele (m. 1608)
- Children: 3, including Piers
- Parent: Peter Edgcumbe (father)

Sir Richard Edgcumbe (circa 1570 – 23 March 1639) of Mount Edgcumbe and of Cotehele in the parish of Calstock, both in Cornwall, was an English politician who sat in the House of Commons at various times between 1586 and 1629.

== Origins ==
He was the eldest son and heir of Peter Edgcumbe of Mount Edgcumbe and Cotehele, Lord Lieutenant of Cornwall and a Member of Parliament by his wife Margaret Luttrell, a daughter of Sir Andrew Luttrell, feudal baron of Dunster, of Dunster Castle in Somerset.

== Career ==
He was a student of Middle Temple in 1585. In 1586, Edgcumbe was elected Member of Parliament (MP) for Liskeard while his father was steward of the town. In 1589, he was elected MP for Totnes. He was elected MP for Grampound in 1593. He was knighted in 1603 and succeeded to the estates on the death of his father in 1608. In 1614, he was elected MP for Bodmin in the Addled Parliament. He was elected MP for Grampound again in 1624 for the Happy Parliament. In 1628, he was elected MP for Bossiney and sat until 1629, when King Charles decided to rule without parliament for eleven years.

== Marriages and children ==
He married twice:

- Firstly, in 1602, to Anne Carey, a daughter of Sir George Carey (c. 1541-1616) of Cockington in the parish of Tor Mohun in Devon, Lord Deputy of Ireland, without issue;
- Secondly, in 1608, he married Mary Coteele, daughter of Sir Thomas Coteele of London, by whom he had three sons including:
  - Piers Edgcumbe.

== Death and burial ==
Edgcumbe died on 23 March 1639 at the age of about 68.

Parliament of England
Preceded by Peter Edgcumbe; Edward Denny	Member of Parliament for Liskeard; 1586; With: Jonathan Trelawny	Succeeded by Jonathan Trelawny; John Jackson
Preceded by John Giles; Nicholas Hayman	Member of Parliament for Totnes; 1589; With: Simon Kelway	Succeeded by Richard Sparry; Christopher Savery
Preceded by Thomas Cromwell; Richard Sayer	Member of Parliament for Grampound; 1593; With: Edward Jones	Succeeded by Sir John Leigh; Robert Newdigate
Preceded by John Stone; Richard Spray	Member of Parliament for Bodmin; 1614; With: Christopher Spray	Succeeded by Sir John Trevor; James Bagge, junior
Preceded by John Hampden; Sir Robert Carey	Member of Parliament for Grampound; 1624; With: John Mohun	Succeeded by John Mohun; Sir Samuel Rolle
Preceded by The Lord Lambart; Paul Specot	Member of Parliament for Bossiney; 1628–1629; With: The Lord Lambart	Parliament suspended until 1640
