= Richard Edgcumbe (1640–1688) =

English politician

High Sheriff of Cornwall
- In office 1685

Member of Parliament for Cornwall
- In office 1679-1681

Member of Parliament for Launceston
- In office 19 March 1661 - 14 February 1679

Personal details
- Born: 13 February 1640
- Died: 3 April 1688 (aged 48)
- Spouse: Anne Montagu
- Children: 8, including Richard
- Parent: Piers Edgcumbe (father)

Sir Richard Edgcumbe (13 February 1640 – 3 April 1688) was an English politician.

== Biography ==
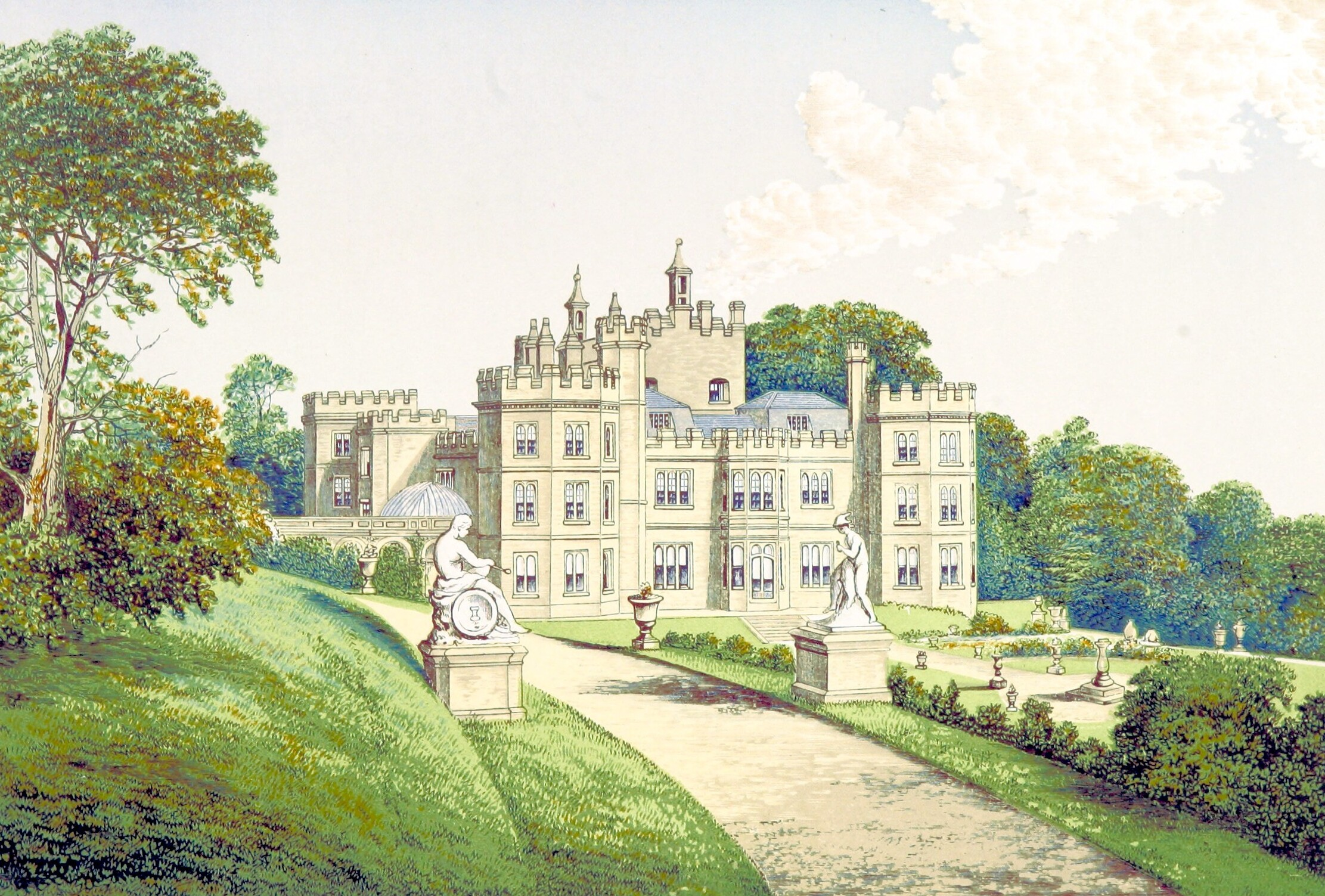
Mount Edgcumbe, 1869

He was the eldest son of Piers Edgcumbe of Mount Edgcumbe House and Cotehele, Calstock, Cornwall, and his wife, Mary, daughter of Sir John Glanville of Broad Hinton, Wiltshire. He was the Member of Parliament for Launceston from 19 March 1661 to 14 February 1679 and MP for Cornwall from 1679 to 1681. He was appointed Knight of the Order of the Bath (KB) in 1661 in order to attend the coronation of Charles II.

He held a number of public appointments, namely Commissioner for Assessment for Cornwall (1663–1680), for Devon (1673–1680) and for Hampshire (1679–1680), Deputy Governor (1670–1672), Assistant Governor (1678–death) and Deputy-Lieutenant of Cornwall (1670–death) and of Devon (1676–death) and Commissioner for Recusants for Cornwall (1675). He was High Sheriff of Cornwall in 1685. He was a Member of the Society of Mines Royal (1669). He was elected a Fellow of the Royal Society in November 1676 but expelled in 1685.

He died aged 48 leaving his 2 sons and 6 daughters. He had married Anne, daughter of Edward Montagu, 1st Earl of Sandwich and Jemima Crewe. Their son Richard Edgcumbe was created Baron Edgcumbe. They also had a daughter Anne who married Henry Pyne, a wealthy landowner of an established County Cork family.

Richard's widow remarried Christopher Montagu and died in 1729. Her mother – the much loved "my lady" of Samuel Pepys – spent her last years at Mount Edgecumbe and is buried there. In his Tangier Journal Pepys records a visit to Lady Edgcumbe on 22 August 1679: "She received me extremely kindly. Visited her house and garden and park, a most beautiful place".
