= Francis Cottington, 1st Baron Cottington =

English lord treasurer

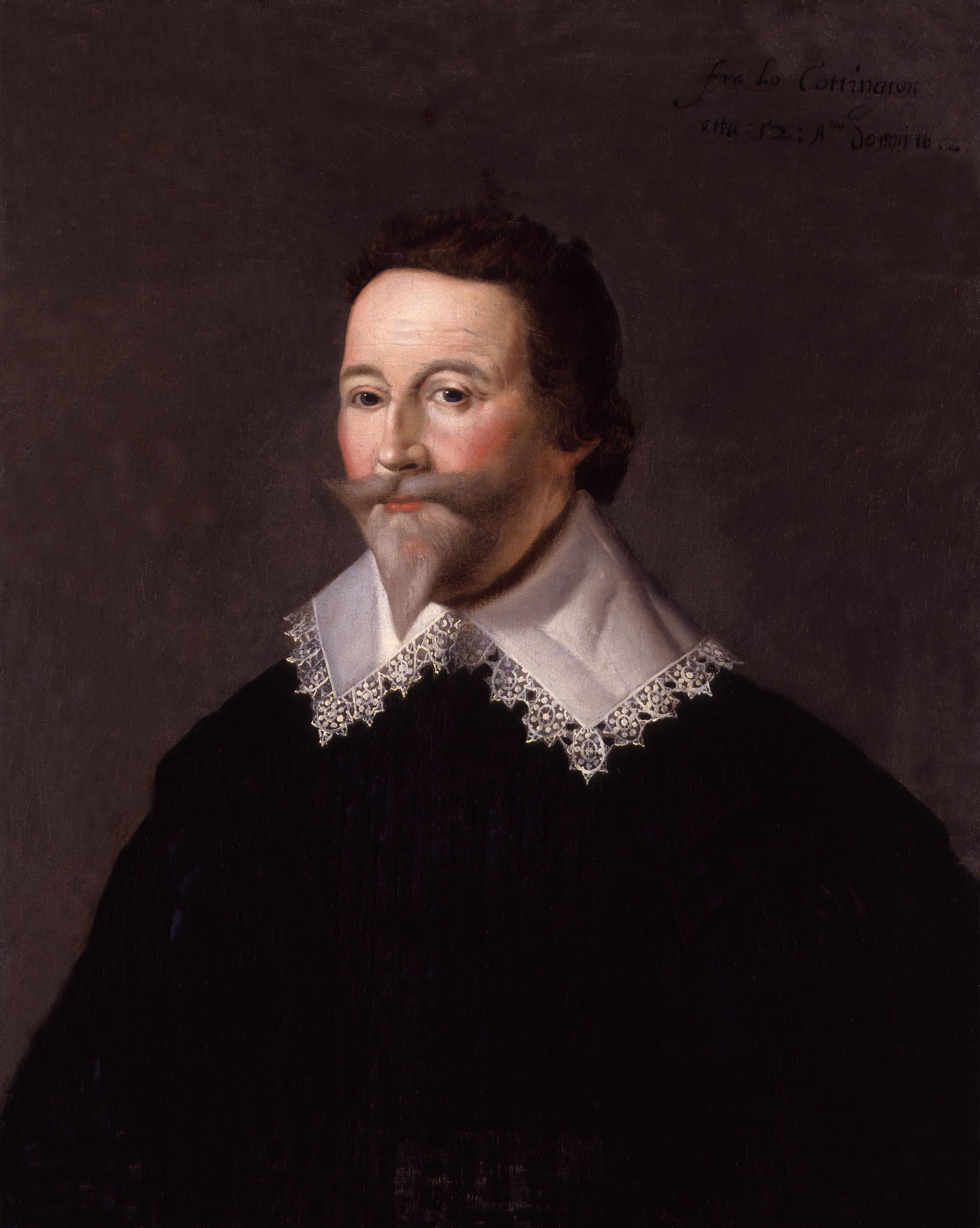
Lord Cottington

Francis Cottington, 1st Baron Cottington (c. 1579 – 1652) was the Lord High Treasurer of England, an ambassador, and the leader of the pro-Spanish, pro-Roman Catholic faction in the court of Charles I.

== Early life ==
He was the fourth son of Philip Cottington of Godmanstone, now Godminster near Bruton in Somerset. According to Hoare, his mother was Jane, daughter of Thomas Biflete, but according to Clarendon, "a Stafford nearly allied to Sir Edward Stafford", through whom he was recommended to Sir Charles Cornwallis, ambassador to the court of Philip III of Spain, becoming a member of his suite and acting as English agent on the latter's recall, from 1609 to 1611.

== Career ==
In 1612 Cottington was appointed English consul at Seville. Returning to England, he was made a clerk of the council in September 1613. His Spanish experience rendered him useful to King James, and his bias in favour of Spain was always marked. He seemed to have promoted the Spanish policy from the first, and pressed on Diego Sarmiento de Acuña, conde de Gondomar, the Spanish ambassador, the proposal for the Spanish in opposition to the French marriage for Prince Charles (later King Charles I).

In 1616 he went as ambassador to Spain, transferring in 1618 the proposal of mediation by James I in the dispute with Frederick V, Elector Palatine.

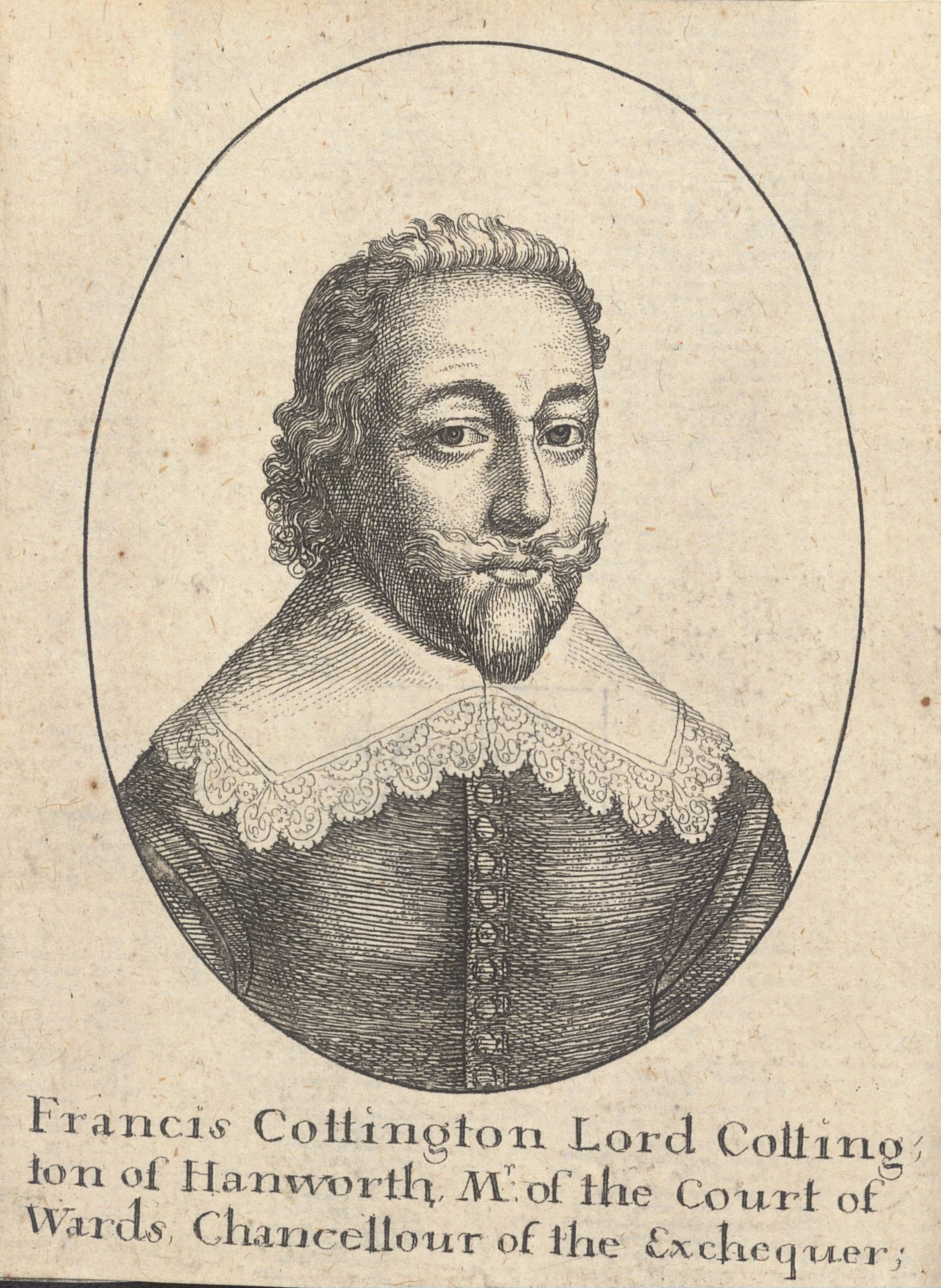
Francis Cottington was created Baron Cottington of Hanworth in Middlesex in 1631.

After his return he was appointed secretary to Prince Charles in October 1622, and was knighted and made a baronet in 1623. He strongly disapproved of the prince's expedition to Spain, as an adventure likely to upset the whole policy of marriage and alliance, but was overruled and chosen to accompany him. His opposition greatly incensed George Villiers, 1st Duke of Buckingham, and still more his perseverance in the Spanish policy after the failure of the expedition, and on Charles I's accession Cottington was through his means dismissed from all his employments and forbidden to appear at court. The duke's assassination, however, enabled him to return.

He was a Roman Catholic at least at heart, becoming a member of that communion in 1623, returning to Protestantism, and again declaring himself a Roman Catholic in 1636, and supporting the cause of the Roman Catholics in England. On 12 November 1628 he was made a privy councillor, and in March 1629 appointed chancellor of the exchequer. In the autumn he was again sent as ambassador to Spain; he signed the peace treaty of Madrid of 5 November 1630 and subsequently a secret agreement arranging for the partition of the Dutch Republic between Spain and England in return for the restoration of the Palatinate. On 10 July 1631 he was created Baron Cottington of Hanworth in Middlesex.

In March 1635 Cottington was appointed master of the Court of Wards and Liveries, and his exactions in this office added greatly to the unpopularity of the government. He was also appointed a commissioner for the Treasury, together with William Laud, and a fierce rivalry sprang up between the two men. However, in their personal encounters Cottington nearly always had the advantage, because he practised great reserve and possessed great powers of self-command, an extraordinary talent for dissembling, and a fund of humour. Laud completely lacked these qualities, and although really possessing much greater influence with Charles, he was often embarrassed and sometimes exposed to ridicule by his opponent.

The aim of Cottington's ambition was the place of lord treasurer, but Laud finally triumphed and secured it for his own nominee, Bishop Juxon, when Cottington became "no more a leader but meddled with his particular duties only." He continued, however, to take a large share in public business and served on the committees for foreign, Irish, and Scottish affairs. In the last, appointed in July 1638, he supported the war, and in May 1640, after the dismissal of the Short Parliament, he declared it his opinion that at such a crisis the king might levy money without the Parliament. His attempts to get funds from the City of London were unsuccessful, and he had recourse instead to a speculation in pepper.

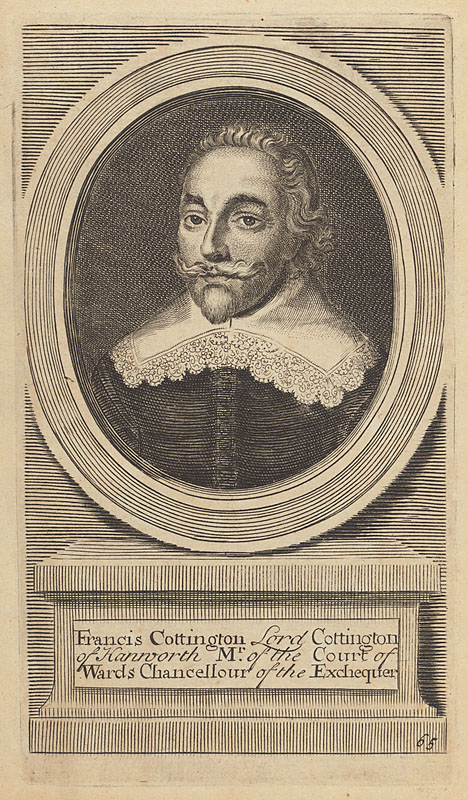
Francis Cottington's title became extinct at his death because all his children predeceased him.

He had been appointed constable of the Tower, and he now prepared the fortress for a siege. In the trial of Strafford in 1641, Cottington denied on oath that he had heard him use the incriminating words about "reducing this kingdom". When the parliamentary opposition became too strong to be any longer defied, Cottington, as one of those who had chiefly incurred their hostility, hastened to retire from the administration, giving up the court of wards in May 1641 and the chancellorship of the exchequer in January 1642. He rejoined the king in 1643, took part in the proceedings of the Oxford Parliament, and was made lord treasurer on 3 October 1643. He signed the surrender of Oxford in July 1646, and being excepted from the indemnity retired abroad.

== Career decline and death ==
Cottington joined Prince Charles at the Hague in 1648, and became one of his counsellors. In 1649, together with Edward Hyde, Cottington went on a mission to Spain to obtain help for the royal cause, having an interview with Cardinal Mazarin at Paris on the way. They met, however, with an extremely ill reception, and Cottington found he had completely lost his popularity at the Spanish court, one cause being his shortcomings and waverings in the matter of religion. He announced his intention of remaining in Spain and of keeping faithful to Roman Catholicism, and took up his residence at Valladolid, where he was maintained by the Jesuits. He died there on 19 June 1652, his body being subsequently buried in Westminster Abbey.

He had amassed a large fortune and built two magnificent houses at Hanworth near Heathrow and Fonthill near Tisbury, Wiltshire. Cottington was evidently a man of considerable ability, but the foreign policy he pursued was opposed to the national interests and futile in itself. According to Clarendon's verdict "he left behind him a greater esteem of his parts than love of his person."

== Personal life ==
He married in 1623 Anne, a daughter of Sir William Meredith and the widow of Sir Robert Brett. Lord and Lady Cottington are buried in Westminster Abbey. All his children predeceased him, and his title became extinct at his death.

== Notes ==
Parliament of England
Preceded by Sir Henry Carey; Edward Carr	Member of Parliament for Camelford; 1624–1625; With: Edward Hare	Succeeded by Sir Henry Hungate; Thomas Coteel
Preceded by Sir Richard Weston; Thomas Bevans	Member of Parliament for Bossiney; 1625; With: Jonathan Prideaux	Succeeded by The Lord Lambert; Paul Speccot
Preceded by Sir Richard Buller; Sir John Hayward	Member of Parliament for Saltash; 1628–1629; With: Sir Richard Buller	Parliament suspended until 1640
Political offices
Preceded by Lord Barrett of Newburgh	Chancellor of the Exchequer; 1629–1642	Succeeded by Sir John Colepeper
Preceded by The Earl of Suffolk	Vice-Admiral of Dorset; 1640–1642	Vacant Title next held by John Arthur
Preceded by The Earl of Suffolk	Lord Lieutenant of Dorset; 1640–1641	Succeeded by The Earl of Salisbury
Preceded by The Earl of Suffolk	Custos Rotulorum of Dorset; 1640–1646; Served alongside: Hon. Denzil Holles; The Earl of Bristol	Vacant English Interregnum Title next held by The Earl of Bristol
In commission The Lord Lyttleton of Mounslow as First Lord Title last held by The Bishop of London	Lord High Treasurer; 1643–1646	In commission Edward Hyde as First Lord Title next held by The Earl of Southampton
Peerage of England
New creation	Baron Cottington; 1631–1652	Extinct
Baronetage of England
New creation	Baronet (of Hanworth); 1623–1652	Extinct
