= Jonathan Prideaux (died 1637) =

English politician (died 1637)

Jonathan Prideaux (died 1637) was an English politician.

== Biography ==
Prideaux was the son of Richard Prideaux of Thuborough and Grace Carminowe. Prideaux inherited a precarious financial situation from his father, which caused a series of legal dealings with creditors and the Court of Chancery during the 1620s. In 1622 he was outlawed over his outstanding debts. On 6 May 1625, Prideaux was elected to the House of Commons of England as a Member of Parliament for Bossiney; his objective was almost certainly to secure temporary relief from his creditors by means of parliamentary privilege. He took no known part in either sitting of the Useless Parliament.

He served as an officer in the Devon militia in 1633. His son, Richard Prideaux, was also a politician.

Parliament of England
Preceded by Sir Richard Weston; Thomas Bevans	Member of Parliament for Bossiney; 1625; With: Sir Francis Cottington	Succeeded by The Lord Lambert; Paul Speccot
