= Newport, Cornwall =

Coordinates: 50.643°N 4.365°W

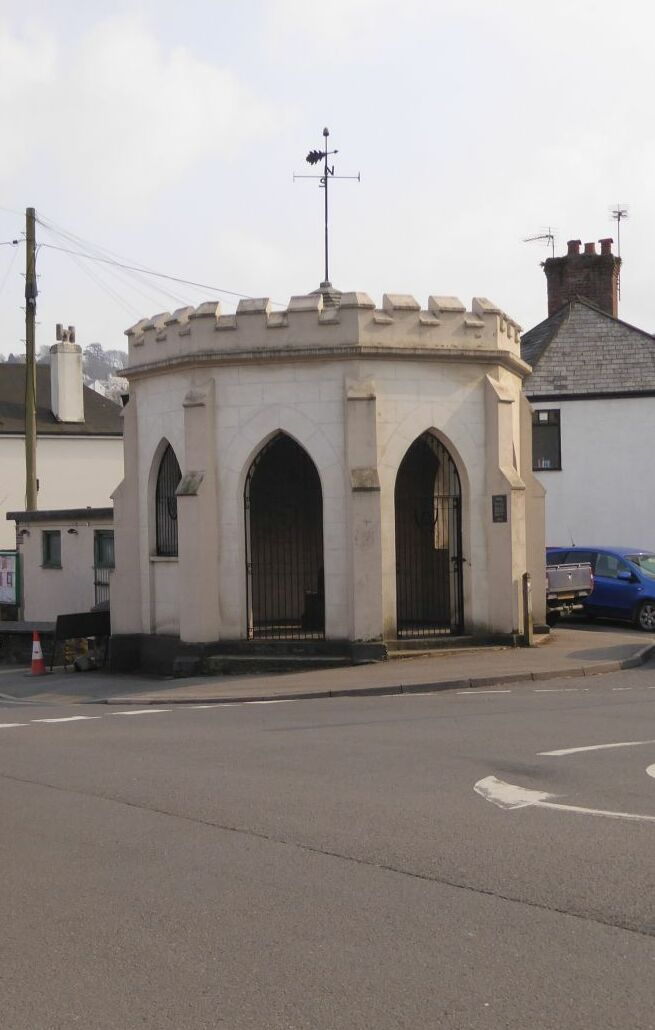
Newport Roundhouse

Newport (Cornish: Porthnowyth) is a suburb of the town of Launceston in Cornwall, England, United Kingdom. Originally a separate settlement, Newport is immediately north of the town from which it is separated by the River Kensey.

Until the early nineteenth century, the Newport constituency elected two Members to the Unreformed House of Commons. However, the constituency was abolished as a rotten borough by the Reform Act 1832. A tucking mill was established in the 15th century by the Flemings at Newport. This was water-powered and continued in use for corn until 1968. Other notable buildings in Newport included the Newport Roundhouse which was completed in 1829.
