= Thomas Herbert (Newport MP) =

British army officer and politician (c.1695–1739)

Thomas Herbert (c.1695–1739) was a British army officer and politician who sat in the House of Commons from 1726 to 1739.

Herbert was the fourth son of Thomas Herbert, 8th Earl of Pembroke, MP, and his first wife Margaret Sawyer, daughter of Sir Robert Sawyer of Highclere Castle. He joined the army and was lieutenant and captain in the 1st Foot Guards in 1719.

Herbert was returned unopposed as Member of Parliament for Newport (Cornwall) on the interest of his first cousin, Sir William Morice at a by-election on 18 February 1726. He was returned unopposed again at the 1727 general election and voted with the Administration on the civil list arrears in 1729 and on the army in 1732. He became a captain and lieutenant colonel in 1730 and became Mayor of Wilton in 1732. At the 1734 general election he was returned again unopposed for Newport and voted with the Government on the repeal of the Septennial Act in 1734 and the Spanish convention in 1739. He was appointed paymaster to the Gibraltar garrison and equerry to the King in 1735 and was appointed Commissioner for Revenue in Ireland in 1737.

Herbert died unmarried on 25 December 1739. His brothers Hon. Nicholas, Robert Sawyer and William Herbert were also MPs.

Parliament of Great Britain
Preceded by Sir Nicholas Morice; John Morice	Member of Parliament for Newport (Cornwall); 1726–1739; With: John Morice; Sir William Morice; Sir John Molesworth	Succeeded by Nicholas Herbert; Sir John Molesworth
