= John Speccot (died 1678) =

English politician (c.1641–1678)

John Speccot (c. 1641 – January 1678) was an English politician.

== Biography ==
Speccot was the only son of Paul Speccot. He was educated at Christ Church, Oxford, matriculating on 3 December 1657, aged 16. Following the Stuart Restoration, he was appointed a justice of the peace for Cornwall. The following year, at the 1661 English general election, he was returned as a Member of Parliament for Newport, presumably while he was still underage. He was appointed to only eight committees in the seventeen years he was in the Commons, including the committee of elections and privileges in three sessions. Speccot opposed the Conventicle Act 1664 and was consequently removed from the commission of the peace for Cornwall in 1670. In 1676 he was listed by Richard Wiseman as being among the Cornish Presbyterians. In 1677, the Earl of Shaftesbury recorded Speccot as being a supporter of the Exclusion Bill. He died the following year and was buried on 10 January 1678 at Egloskerry.

Parliament of England
Preceded by Sir Francis Drake, Bt; Hon. Laurence Hyde	Member of Parliament for Newport with Sir Francis Drake, Bt (1661–1662); Piers Edgcumbe (1662–1667); Nicholas Morice (1667–1678); 1661–1678	Succeeded by Nicholas Morice; Ambrose Manaton
