= Sir Nicholas Morice, 2nd Baronet =

English politician

Member of Parliament for Newport
- In office 1702-1726

Personal details
- Born: 1681
- Died: 27 January 1726 (aged 44–45)
- Party: Tory
- Spouse: Catherine Herbert (m. 1704)
- Children: 3, including William
- Parent: William Morice (father)
- Relatives: William Morice (grandfather)
- Education: Exeter College, Oxford

Sir Nicholas Morice, 2nd Baronet (1681–27 January 1726) of Werrington Park (then in Devon but now in Cornwall) was an English politician who sat in the English and British House of Commons from 1702 to 1726.

== Early life ==
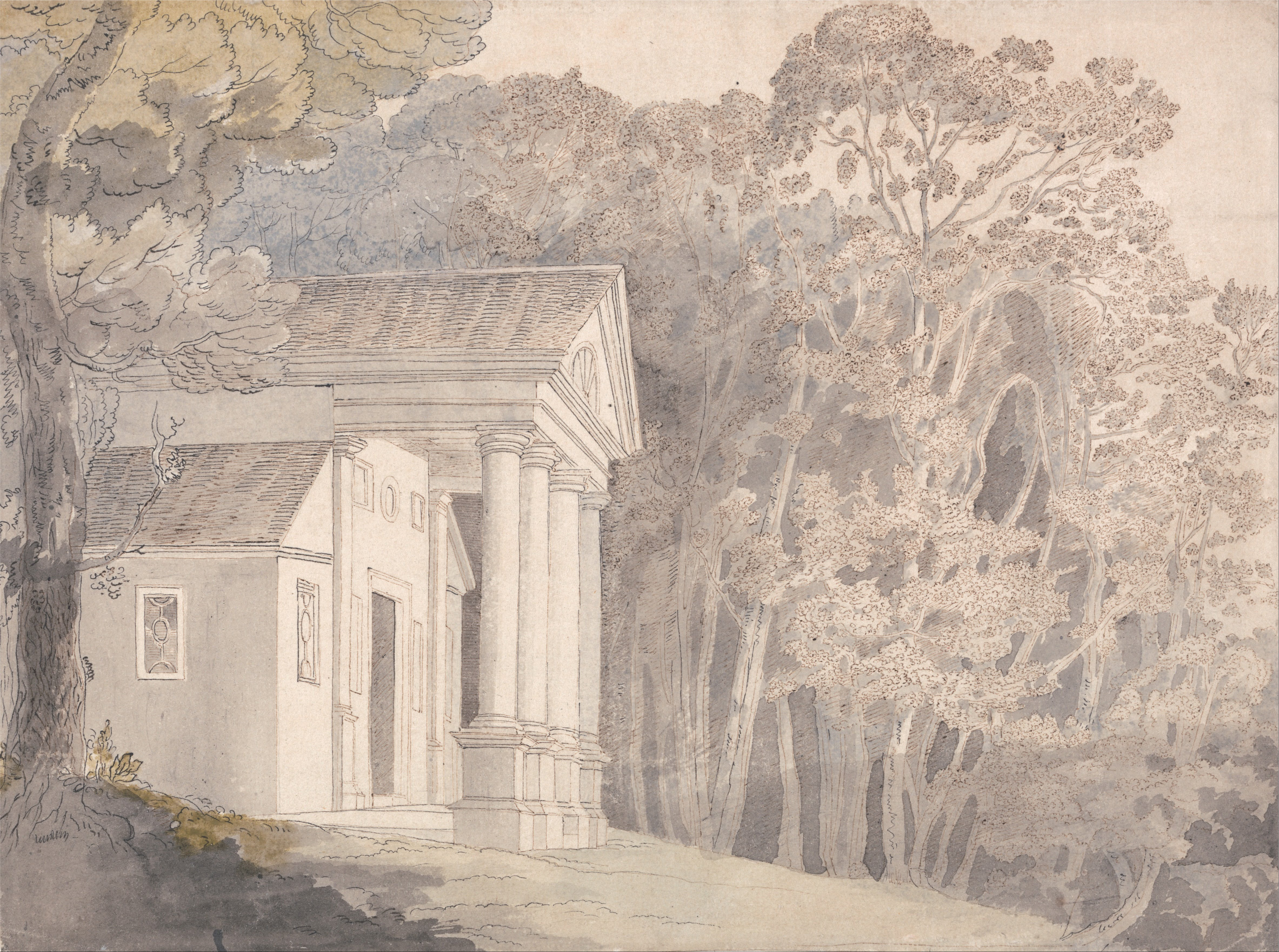
Werrington Park, Cornwall

Morice was the eldest surviving son of Sir William Morice, 1st Baronet, MP for Newport, Cornwall and his second wife Elizabeth Reynell, daughter of Richard Reynell of Ogwell Devon. He succeeded his father in the baronetcy in 1690. He matriculated at Exeter College, Oxford on 14 April 1698, aged 17. By a licence dated 21 March 1704, he married Lady Catherine Herbert, the daughter of Thomas Herbert, 8th Earl of Pembroke.

== Career ==
Morice was returned as Member of Parliament for Newport, at the English general elections of 1702 and 1705 and at the British general elections of 1708, 1710 and 1713. He was returned at the 1715 general election as a Tory and consistently opposed the Administration. He was returned again at the 1722 general election.

== Death and legacy ==
Morice died on 27 January 1726. With his wife, he had a son and two daughters. He was succeeded to the baronetcy and Werrington Park by his son Sir William Morice, 3rd Baronet.

Parliament of England
Preceded by Sir William Pole and John Spark	Member of Parliament for Newport; 1702–1726 with John Spark (1702–1707); Sir William Pole (1708–1710); George Courtenay (1710–1713); Humphry Morice (1717–1722); Sir William Pole (1722); John Morice (1722–1726)	Succeeded by Thomas Herbert and John Morice
Baronetage of England
Preceded by William Morice	Baronet (of Werrington); 1690–1726	Succeeded by William Morice
