= Henry Hungate =

Sir Henry Hungate (1598 – c. 1648) was an English politician who sat in the House of Commons in 1625 and 1626.

Hungate was the son of William Hungate of East Bradenham, Norfolk. He was educated at St Julian's and St Albans, Hertfordshire under Mr Heyward and was admitted at Caius College, Cambridge on 28 November 1613 aged 15. He was admitted at Gray's Inn on 8 February 1615. He was knighted on 20 April 1619. In 1625, he was elected Member of Parliament for Camelford. He was elected MP for Newport in 1626. He was of St Martin-in-the-Fields, London and was probably sequestered as a royalist. His will was proved in 1648.

Parliament of England
Preceded by Sir Francis Cottington; Edward Hare	Member of Parliament for Camelford; 1625; With: Thomas Cotteel	Succeeded by Edward Lyndley; Sir Thomas Monk
Preceded by John Eliot; Ralph Speccot	Member of Parliament for Newport; 1626; With: Thomas Williams	Succeeded by Piers Edgcumbe; Sir William Killigrew
