= Robert Rolle (died 1710) =

British politician

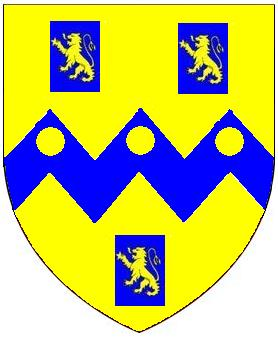
- Arms of Rolle: Or, on a fesse dancetté between three billets azure each charged with a lion rampant of the first three bezants

Member of Parliament for Devon
- In office 1702-1710

Member of Parliament for Callington
- In office 1701-1702

Personal details
- Born: c. 1677 England
- Died: 18 November 1710 (aged 32–33)
- Party: Tory
- Spouse: Elizabeth Duke (m. 1705)
- Relatives: John Rolle (brother); John Rolle (grandfather); Henry Rolle (nephew); John Rolle Walter (nephew); Denys Rolle (nephew)

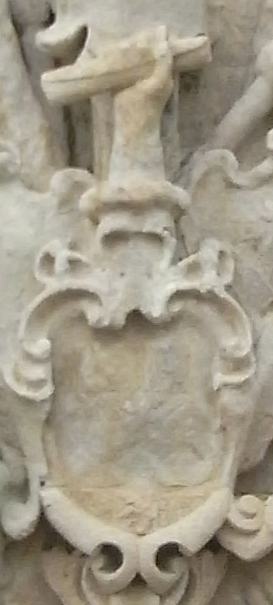
Arms (much worn) and crest of Robert Rolle below the statue of Queen Anne presented by him to the Corporation of Barnstaple in 1708

Robert Rolle (c. 1677 – 18 November 1710) of Stevenstone, in Devon, was an English landowner and Tory politician who sat in the English and British House of Commons between 1701 and 1710.

== Early life ==
Rolle was the eldest son of John Rolle, son and heir apparent of Sir John Rolle of Stevenstone, and his wife Lady Christiana Bruce, daughter of Robert Bruce, 1st Earl of Ailesbury and 2nd Earl of Elgin. Rolle's father died on 22 April 1689 during the lifetime of his father, and his mother married secondly Sir Robert Gayer, KB, of Buckinghamshire. Thus he was heir to his grandfather Sir John Rolle on his death in 1706. The Rolle family was one of the richest and most powerful in Devon and owned several dozen manors, their most ancient holding being Stevenstone near Great Torrington in the north of the county, whilst Bicton in the east was the centre of another large block of territory.

== Career ==
Rolle was returned as Member of Parliament for Callington, a pocket borough of the Rolle family, at the two general elections of 1701. At the 1702 English general election he was returned as Tory MP for Devon. He was returned at the 1705 English general election and voted against the Court candidate as Speaker on 25 October 1705.

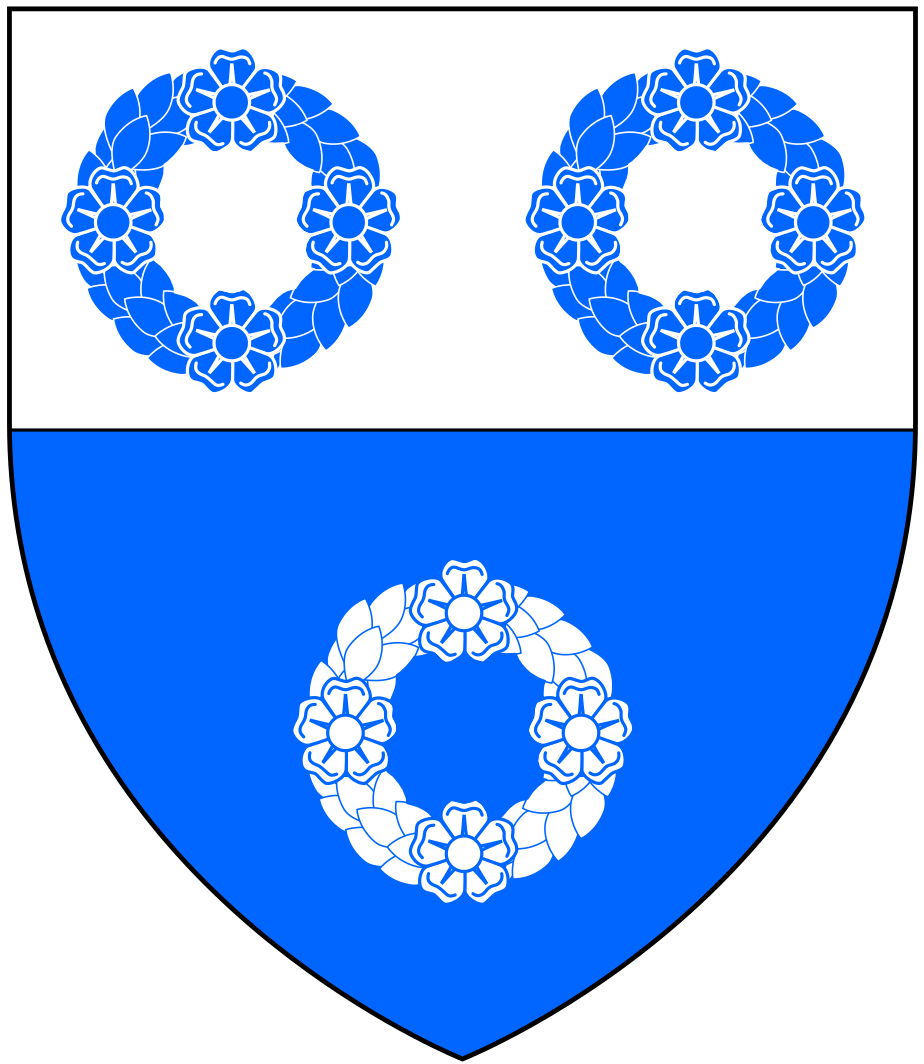
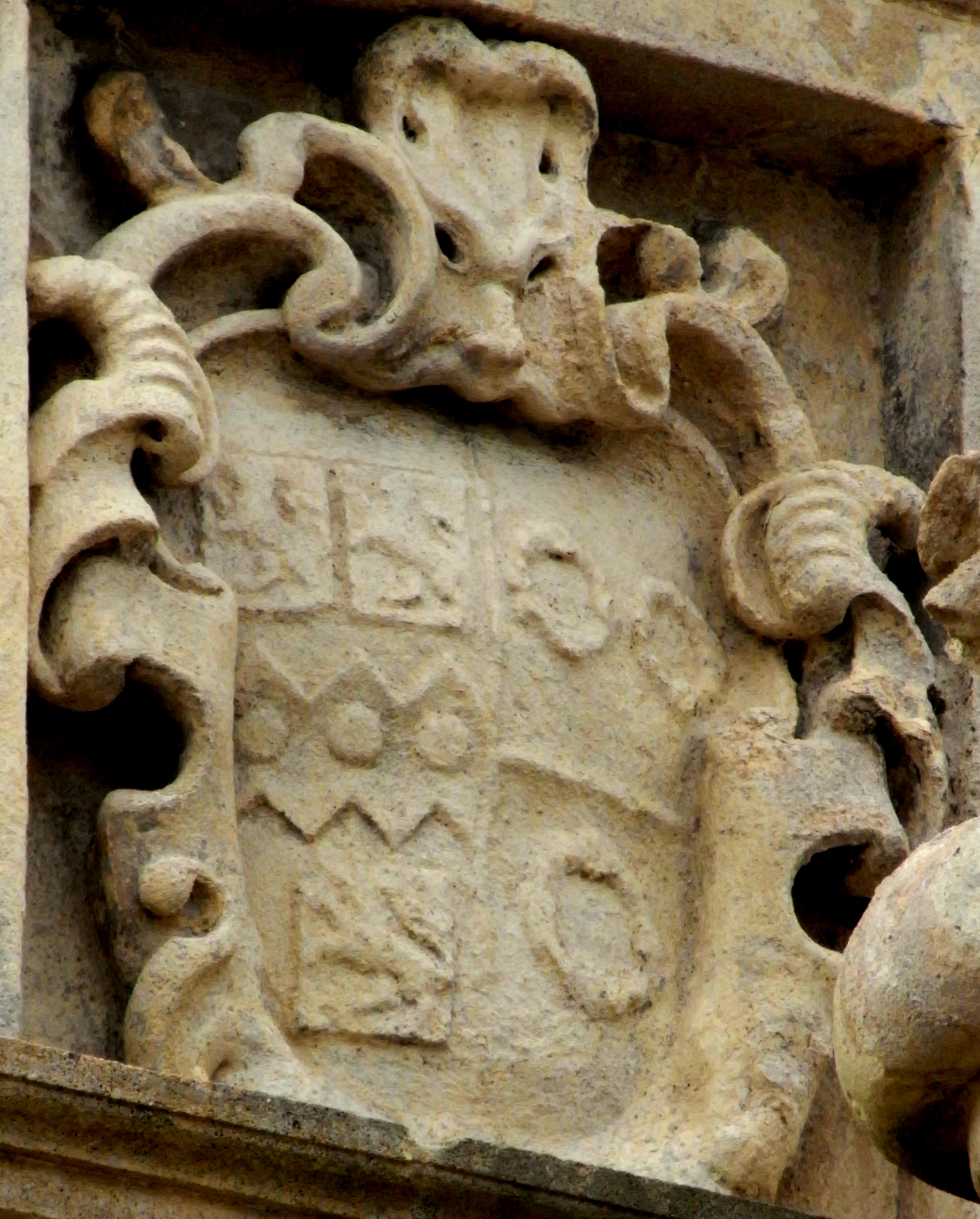
Left: Armorial of Duke family of Otterton: Per fesse argent and azure, three chaplets counterchanged; right: one of two escutcheons of arms of Rolle impaling Duke, on either side of the base of the statue of Queen Anne given to Barnstaple Corporation by Robert Rolle in 1708

Rolle married on 19 March 1705 Elizabeth Duke (died 1716), daughter of Richard Duke (1652–1733), MP, of Otterton, Devon, which manor adjoined the Rolle seat of Bicton. On his marriage Robert received an annual settlement of £1,500 from his grandfather Sir John Rolle.

On his grandfather's death in 1706 Rolle inherited the Rolle estates, including the two principal seats of Stevenstone and Bicton. It was soon discovered that the estate was encumbered by liabilities of about £15,000, comprising debts, legacies and portions. It thus became essential to realise some of the assets, which were however tied-up in trusts and entails. With his two brothers, he petitioned Parliament on 11 February 1708 to obtain a private act of Parliament enabling them to break the trusts in order to make these sales.

Rolle's Estate Act 1709
- Act of Parliament
- Parliament of Great Britain
- Long title: An Act to vest in and enable Trustees to sell some Part of the Estate late of Sir John Rolle Knight of the Bath, deceased, for the Payment of Debts, Legacies, and Portions; and for settling of other Lands to the same Uses.
- Citation: 8 Ann. c. 6 Pr. (Note: This is the citation in The Statutes of the Realm.); 8 Ann. c. 7 Pr. (Note: This is the citation in The Statutes at Large.)
- Territorial extent: Great Britain

Dates
- Royal assent: 13 March 1710
- Commencement: 15 November 1709 (Note: Start of session.)

Status: Current legislation

At the 1708 British general election Rolle was returned again as MP for Devon. After the "Rolle's Estate Bill" was passed in 1710 as the Rolle's Estate Act 1709 (8 Ann. c. 6 Pr.), Rolle was enabled to sell some out-lying parts of the estate and re-invest any surplus proceeds in purchases by the same trust in lands situated more conveniently. As a Tory, he voted against the impeachment of Henry Sacheverell in 1710.

== Death and legacy ==
Rolle died on 18 August 1710 after having become ill at the Exeter Assizes allegedly from a "surfeit of drinking" and died "of convulsion fits". He was buried at Bicton and his heir was his younger brother John Rolle (1679–1730), MP. His nephew Dennis Rolle (died 1797) of Stevenstone, later purchased in 1786 the manors of Otterton and East Budleigh from the heirs of the last male of the Duke family.

== Monument in Barnstaple ==
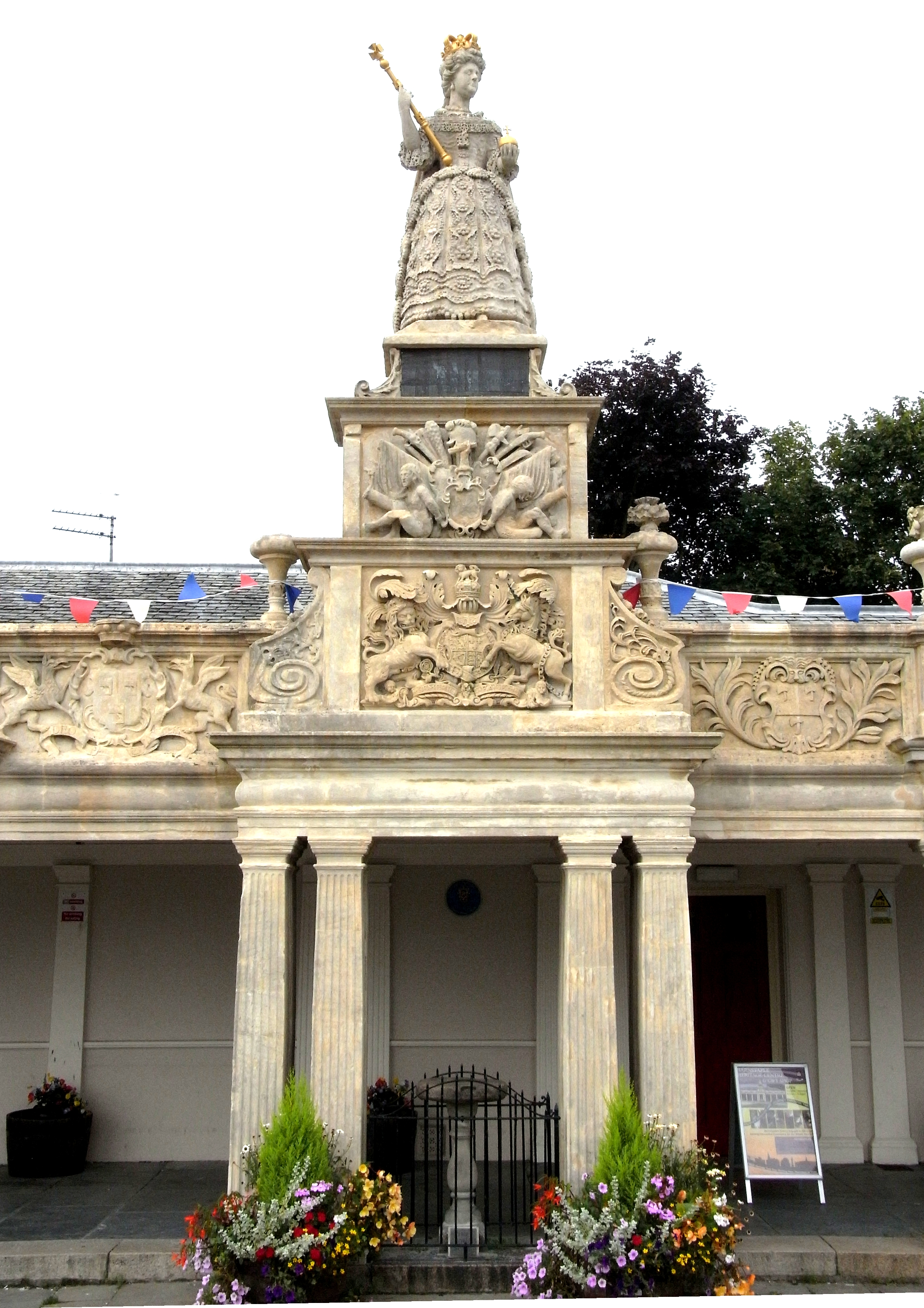
Statue of Queen Anne given by Robert Rolle in 1708 to the Corporation of Barnstaple. Queen Anne's Walk, Barnstaple

In 1708 Robert Rolle donated to the Corporation of Barnstaple, Devon, a large stone statue of Queen Anne, the victorious monarch of the recent Battle of Blenheim in 1704, which was placed atop the newly constructed Mercantile Exchange, which thenceforth bore the name Queen Anne's Walk. Underneath the statue, possibly intended to be free-standing and not on top of this building, is its original base, now seated somewhat incongruously above the Royal Arms. On the base is an escutcheon showing a cartouche with the arms of Rolle, now much worn, above which is the Rolle crest: A cubit arm erect vested or charged with a fess indented cotised azure in the hand a roll of parchment. On either side of the Rolle arms is a seated naked, disheveled and shackled French prisoner of war, behind whom is a centrally placed antique trophy of arms consisting of captured French weapons (two canon, muskets, a club, a halberd and a helmet etc.) and two lowered French standards on either side. The imagery is reminiscent of the sculptures of two French captives atop the central pediment of Blenheim Palace, built for the Duke of Marlborough, the victorious English commander at that battle. The original source for both is imagery from the classical world, as visible for example on Roman coins. On each side of the base of the statue of Queen Anne is an escutcheon showing the arms of Rolle impaling Duke, the arms of his wife. Immediately below the feet of the Queen is a tablet on which is inscribed the following Latin text: "Anna, Intemeratae fidei testimonium Roberti Rolle de Stephenstone in agro Devoniensi Armigeri MDCCVIII" ("Anne, a testament of the undefiled faith of Robert Rolle, Esquire, of Stevenstone in the land of Devonshire, 1708"). The gift of this statue appears to have prompted the Corporation to build the mercantile exchange, financed by a dozen or so of the leading merchants whose arms are sculpted within the frieze, on the quay now known as Queen Anne's Walk, on top of which sits the statue. The inscription was transcribed by the Devon topographer Rev. John Swete in his "Journals".

Imagery for Queen Anne Statue
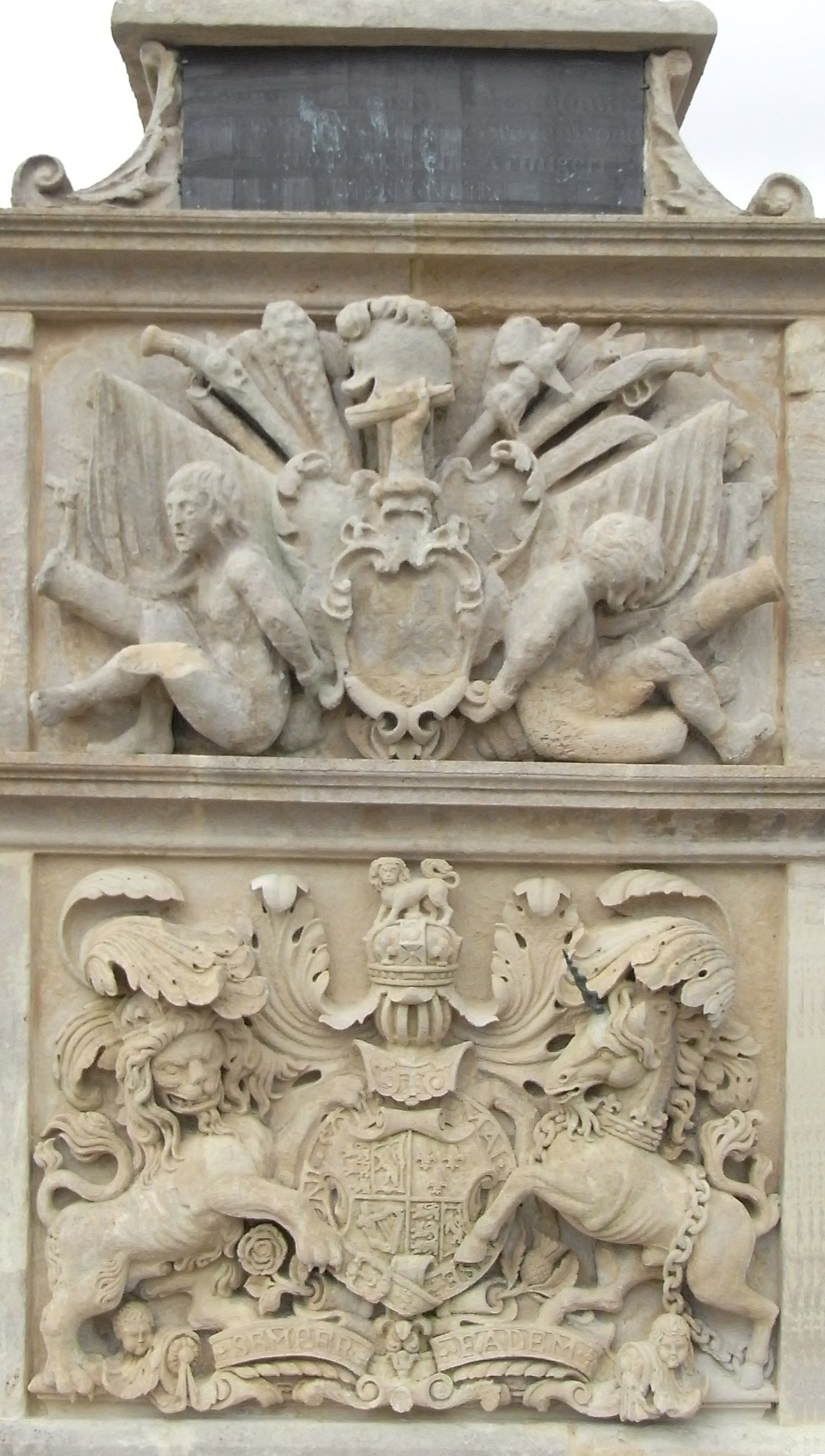
Detail of central panel below statue of Queen Anne

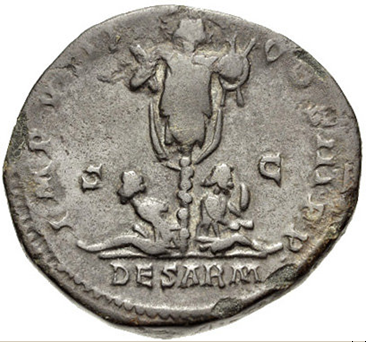
Reverse of Roman coin struck c.AD 177 showing bound Sarmatian captives seated adorsed either side of a vexillum draped with spoils. A well-known and commonly used image from the ancient world which inspired the sculpture on the base of Rolle's statue of Queen Anne, on which the Roman vexillum is replaced by the Rolle cartouche and crest

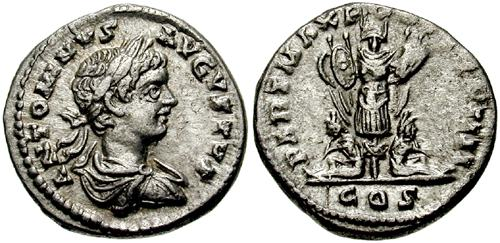
Roman coin of the Emperor Caracalla struck 201 AD, showing similar imagery

== Bibliography ==
- Vivian, Lt.Col. J.L., The Visitations of the County of Devon, Exeter, 1895, pp. 652–656, Rolle of Stevenstone

Parliament of England
Preceded by Sir William Coryton; Francis Fulford	Member of Parliament for Callington; 1701 –1702; With: Sir William Coryton 1701; Samuel Rolle 1701-1702	Succeeded by Samuel Rolle; John Acland
Preceded by Sir William Courtenay, Bt; Sir John Pole, Bt	Member of Parliament for Devon; 1702–1707; With: Sir William Courtenay, Bt	Succeeded by Parliament of Great Britain
Parliament of Great Britain
Preceded by Parliament of England	Member of Parliament for Devon; 1707– 1710; With: Sir William Courtenay, Bt	Succeeded by Sir William Pole; John Rolle
