= Sir John Pole, 3rd Baronet =

English politician

Member of Parliament for Lyme Regis
- In office 1685–1689 Serving with Sir Winston Churchill; John Burridge
- Preceded by: Thomas Moore
- Succeeded by: Henry Henley

Member of Parliament for Bossiney
- In office 1698 – January 1701 Serving with John Tregagle (1673–1712)
- Preceded by: George Booth
- Succeeded by: Francis Robartes

Member of Parliament for Devon
- In office December 1701 – 1702 Serving with Sir William Courtenay
- Preceded by: Samuel Rolle
- Succeeded by: Robert Rolle (died 1710)

Member of Parliament for Devon
- In office July 1702 – 1705 Serving with Sir Henry Seymour
- Preceded by: Samuel Rolle
- Succeeded by: Robert Rolle (died 1710)

Member of Parliament for Newport
- In office 1707–1708 Serving with Sir Nicholas Morice
- Preceded by: John Spark
- Succeeded by: Sir William Pole

Personal details
- Born: 17 June 1649
- Died: 13 March 1708
- Spouse: Anne Pole (née Maurice)
- Children: 3 sons, 1 daughter (including William
- Parents: Sir Courtenay Pole, 2nd Baronet (father); Urith Pole (née Shapcote) (mother)

Sir John Pole, 3rd Baronet (17 June 1649 – 13 March 1708) was an English peer and politician.

== Family ==
He was the first son of Sir Courtenay Pole, 2nd Baronet and Urith, the daughter of Thomas Shapcote. He married circa. 1666 Anne, the daughter of Sir William Maurice. They had 3 sons and 1 daughter. He succeeded his father as baronet circa. April 1695.

== Parliamentary career ==
He was elected in 1688 as MP for Lyme Regis and though he supported William III of England, he later opposed transferring the crown and was defeated in the 1690 election. He returned to parliament as MP for Bossiney in 1698, aligned with the Country Party.

He served on a grand jury in Devon that opposed dissolving the 1701 parliament and was later elected to the Devon county as a Tory in December 1701 till 1702. He later represented East Looe from 1702 till 1705 and Newport from 21 January 1707 until his death on 13 March 1708. He was buried near his estate in Colyton, Devon.
