= William Morice (secretary of state) =

English politician and theologian

Sir William Morice
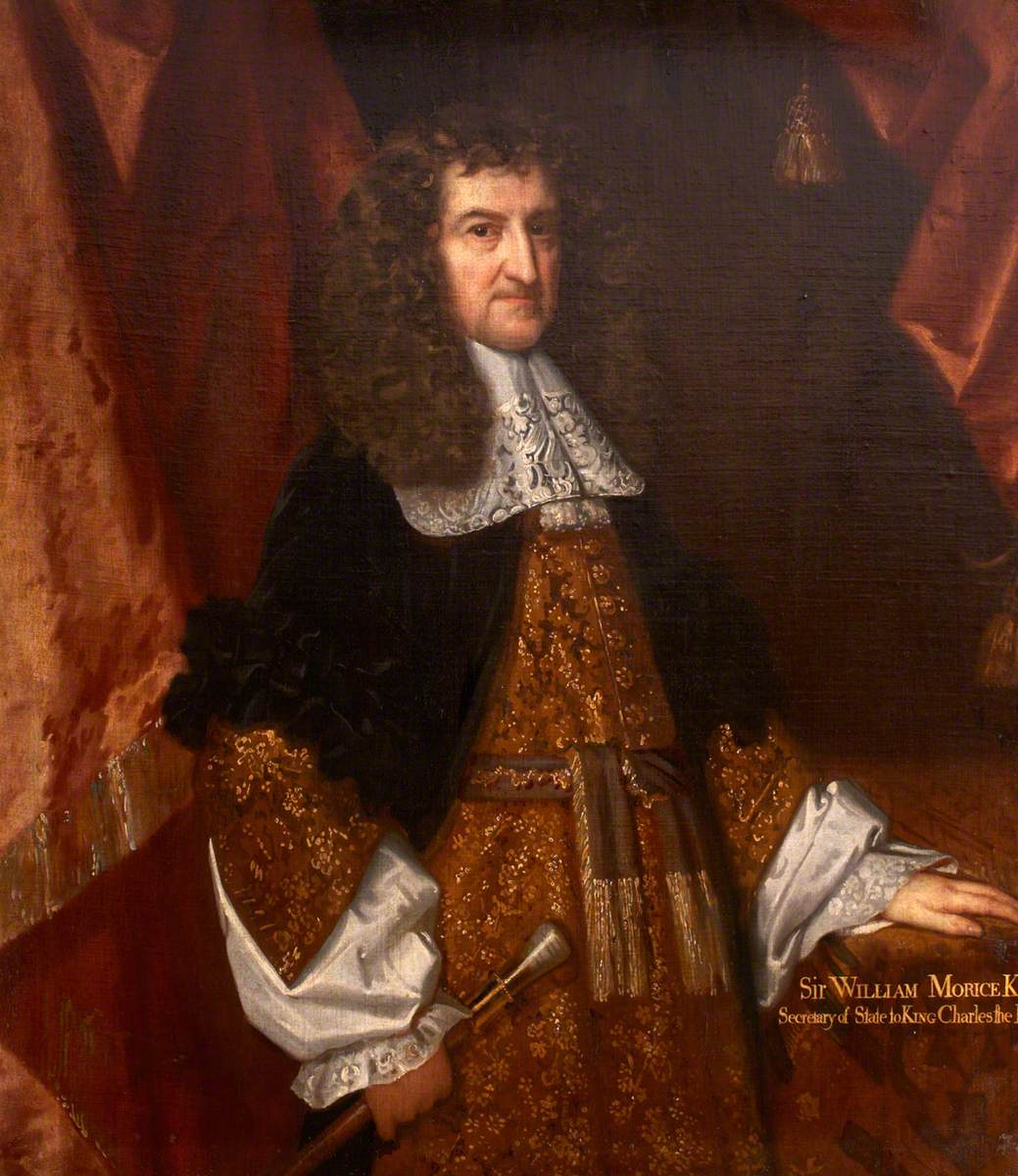
- Portrait of Sir William Morice by Jacob Huysmans

Secretary of State for the Northern Department
- In office 27 May 1660 – 29 September 1668
- Monarch: Charles II
- Succeeded by: Sir John Trevor

Personal details
- Born: 6 November 1602
- Died: 12 December 1676 (aged 74)
- Spouse: Elizabeth Prideaux
- Children: William
- Relatives: Nicholas Morice (grandson)
- Education: Exeter College, Oxford

Sir William Morice (6 November 1602 – 12 December 1676) of Werrington in Devon, was an English statesman and theologian. He served as Secretary of State for the Northern Department and a Lord of the Treasury from June 1660 to September 1668.

== Life ==
Morice was educated at Exeter College, Oxford. He was elected Member of Parliament for Devon to fill a vacancy in 1648, but was excluded in Pride's Purge in December of that year, probably before he had taken his seat. Nevertheless, he was appointed High Sheriff of Devon in 1651, and returned to Parliament as MP for Devon in the First Protectorate Parliament elected in 1654. He subsequently represented Devon again in the Second Protectorate Parliament, Newport (Cornwall) in the Third Protectorate Parliament.

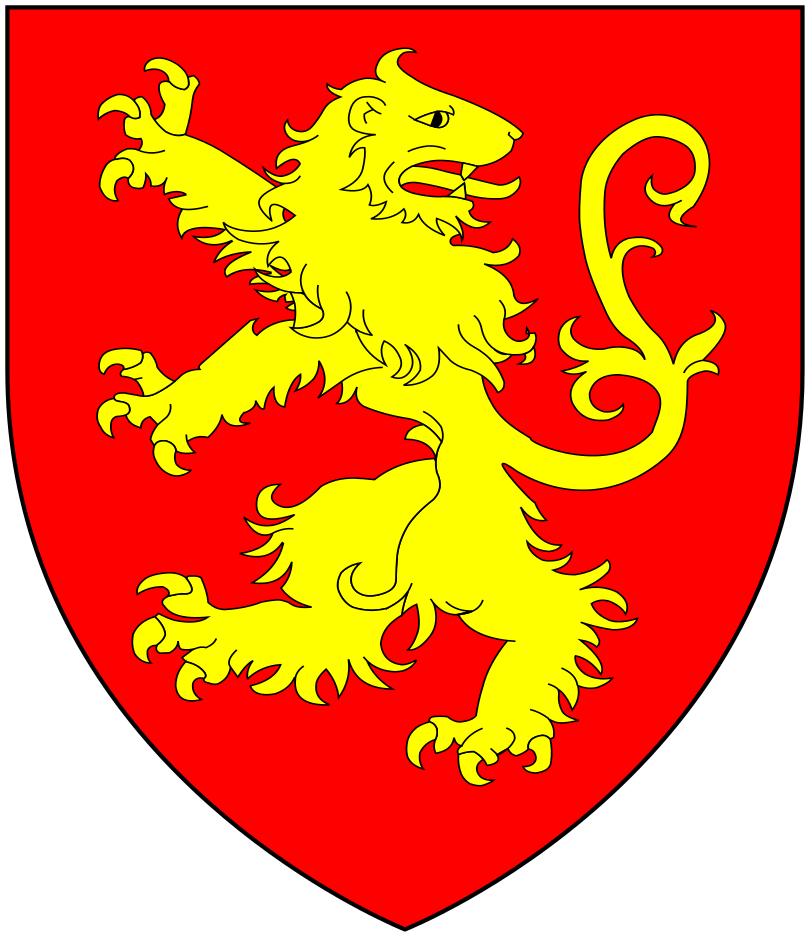
Arms of Morice of Werrington, Devon: Gules, a lion rampant reguardant or

A relation of General Monck, Morice assisted in the Restoration and was knighted in 1660. He was also made a Privy Counsellor and appointed Secretary of State for the Northern Department, an office he held until he resigned in 1668; he was apparently an undistinguished minister, but justified his tenure of office by his usefulness in the House of Commons. In the Convention Parliament of 1660 he was re-elected for Newport but was also elected for Plymouth, which he chose to represent, and was that city's MP until his death 16 years later.

In 1657, during the Commonwealth, he published a treatise on the administration of the sacrament to all church members.

=== Marriage and children ===
Morice married Elizabeth Prideaux, a daughter of Humphrey Prideaux (abt 1573–1617) of Soldon, and Honor Fortescue, by whom he had children including

- Sir William Morice, 1st Baronet (c.1628–1690), eldest son and heir, MP, created a baronet in 1661.
- John Morice (c. 1630–1705), MP.
- Nicholas Morice (c.1640–1712), MP.
- Anne (b. c.1653), who married Sir John Pole, 3rd Baronet
- Thomasine, who married Sir Walter Moyle

== Notes ==
Parliament of England
Preceded by John Maynard; Edmund Fowell	Member of Parliament for Plymouth; 1660–1677; With: Samuel Trelawny 1660–1666; Sir Gilbert Talbot 1666–1677	Succeeded by Sir Gilbert Talbot; John Sparke
Political offices
New office	Secretary of State for the Northern Department; 1660–1668	Succeeded by Sir John Trevor
Military offices
Unknown	Governor of Plymouth; 1660–1661	Succeeded by The Earl of Bath
