= James Trewynnard =

16th-century English politician

James Trewynnard (c. 1505 – 1572 or later), of Budock, Cornwall, was an English politician.

He was a member (MP) of the parliament of England for Liskeard in 1529, Newport, Cornwall in 1547 and Penryn in November 1554.
