= Sir William Morice, 3rd Baronet =

English Tory politician (c. 1707–1750)

Member of Parliament for Launceston
- In office 1734-1750

Member of Parliament for Newport
- In office 1727-1734

Personal details
- Born: c. 1707
- Died: 24 January 1750 (aged 42–43)
- Party: Tory
- Spouse(s): Lucy Wharton (m. 1731; div. 1738) Anna Bury (m. 1741)
- Parent: Nicholas Morice (father)
- Relatives: Thomas Herbert (grandfather)
- Education: Corpus Christi College, Oxford

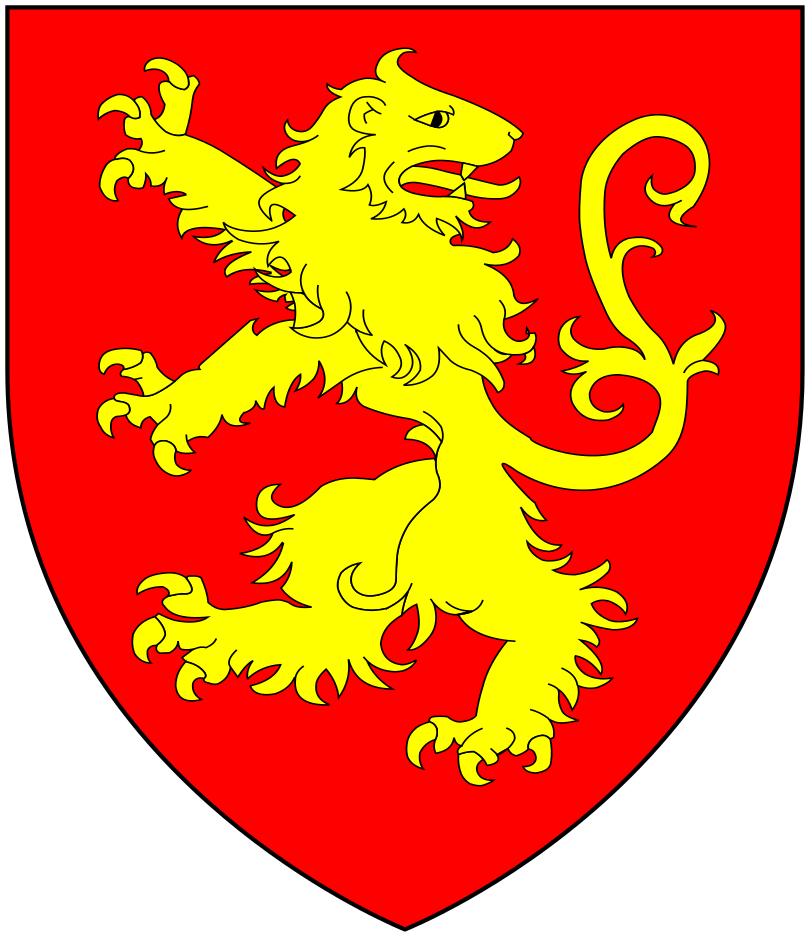
Arms of Morice of Werrington, Devon: Gules, a lion rampant reguardant or

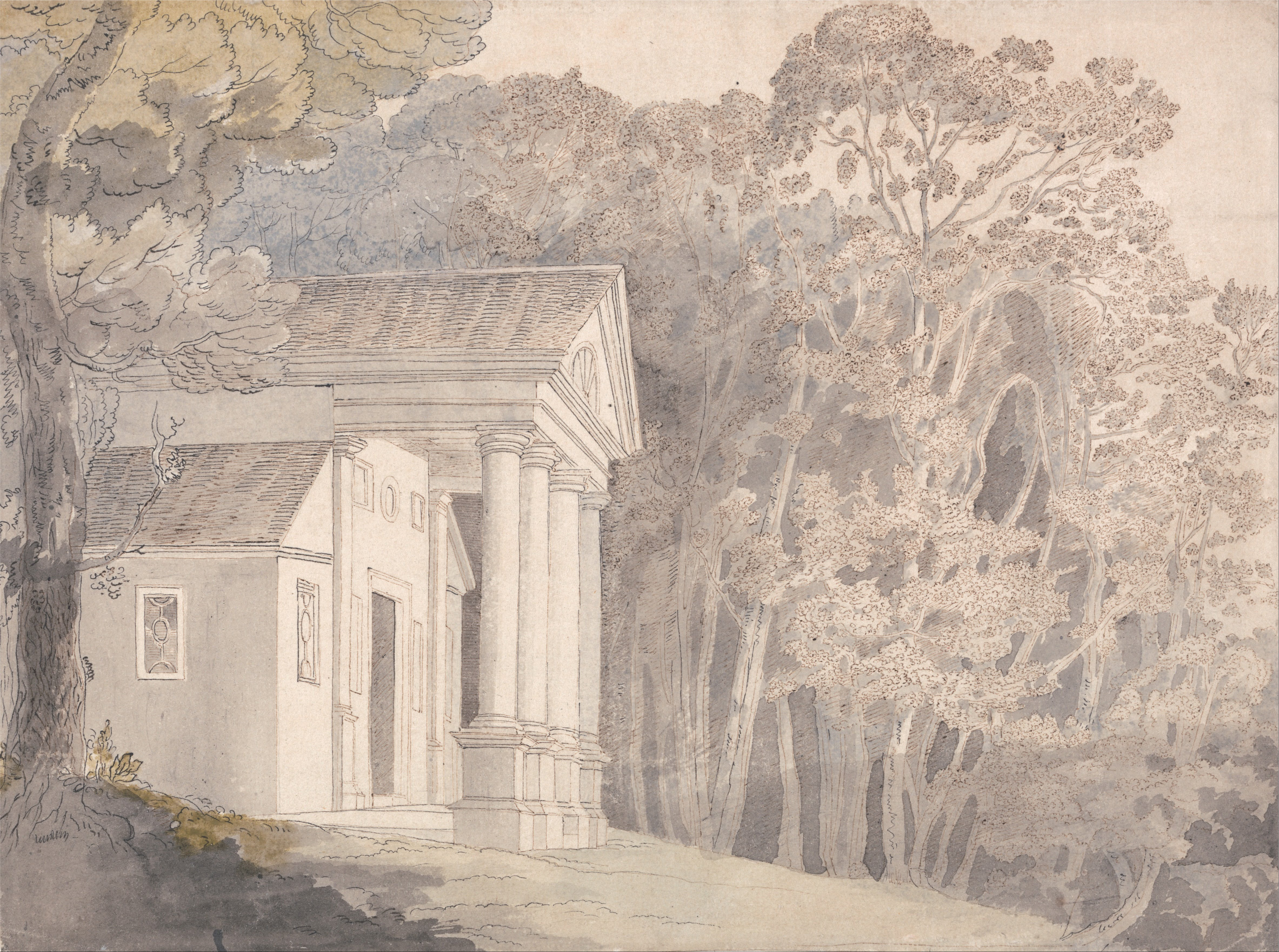
Werrington Park, Cornwall

Sir William Morice, 3rd Baronet (c. 1707 – 24 January 1750) of Werrington Park (then in Devon but now in Cornwall) was an English Tory politician who sat in the House of Commons from 1727 to 1750.

== Biography ==
Morice was the only son of Sir Nicholas Morice, 2nd Baronet and his wife Lady Catherine Herbert, the daughter of Thomas Herbert, 8th Earl of Pembroke. He was educated at Salisbury School, and matriculated at Corpus Christi College, Oxford on 24 August 1724, aged 17. In 1726 he succeeded his father to the baronetcy and Werrington.

Morice was returned unopposed as Member of Parliament (MP) for Newport at the 1727 British general election. He was sometime Recorder of Launceston and at the 1734 British general election he was returned in a contest as MP for Launceston. He contributed to the election fund raised by the Cornish Tories in 1741 and was returned unopposed for Launceston at the 1741 British general election. He voted regularly with the Opposition with the exception of the vote on the Bossiney election petition in December that year when he voted with the Government. As an injured husband himself, he was persuaded in this case by Lord Abergavenny whose wife had been seduced by one of the opposition candidates, Richard Liddell. In 1744 Morice came into conflict with the Duke of Bedford over hunting rights near Werrington. He was returned unopposed again at the 1747 British general election. Bedford purchased an estate at Newport, and in 1748 began unsuccessfully to attack Morice in his boroughs.

Morice married Lady Lucy Wharton, the daughter of Thomas Wharton, 1st Marquess of Wharton, on 8 September 1731. They were divorced in 1738 and he married secondly in 1741, Anna Bury, the daughter of Thomas Bury of Berrynarbor, Devon. He died on 17 January 1750 without issue and the baronetcy became extinct. Werrington was sold in 1775 to Hugh Percy, 1st Duke of Northumberland.

Parliament of England
Preceded by John Morice; Thomas Herbert	Member of Parliament for Newport; 1727–1734; With: Thomas Herbert	Succeeded by Thomas Herbert; Sir John Molesworth
Preceded by Arthur Tremayne; Hon. John King	Member of Parliament for Launceston; 1734–1750; With: Hon. John King	Succeeded by Hon. John King; Sir William Irby
Baronetage of England
Preceded by Nicholas Morice	Baronet (of Werrington); 1726–1750	Extinct
