= Thomas Roper (MP) =

16th-century English politician

Thomas Roper (1533/34–1598) was an English politician.

He was the eldest son of William Roper of St Dunstan's, Canterbury and Eltham, Kent and educated at Lincoln's Inn.

He was a member (MP) of the parliament of England for New Shoreham in October 1553 and for Newport, Cornwall in 1558.

He married Lucy, the daughter of Sir Anthony Browne of Cowdray, Sussex, with whom he had 5 sons and 5 daughters.
