= Newport (Cornwall) (constituency) =

Former parliamentary constituency in the United Kingdom

Newport
- Former borough constituency for the House of Commons

1529–1832
- Seats: Two
- Created from: Dunheved
- Replaced by: Launceston

Newport was a rotten borough situated in Cornwall. It is now the suburb of Newport within the town of Launceston, which was itself also a parliamentary borough at the same period. It is also referred to as Newport iuxta Launceston, to distinguish it from other constituencies named Newport.

== History ==
From 1529 until it was abolished by the Reform Act 1832, Newport returned two Members of Parliament. Until the early 18th century, the right to vote was held by all inhabitants paying scot and lot, but subsequently it was converted to a burgage franchise, meaning that the right to vote was tied to ownership of certain properties within the borough, which could be bought and sold at will. This reduced the number of qualified voters: under the scot and lot qualification around 70 people had had the right to vote, but by 1831 the number was only about 12.

The borough had a population of 595 in 1831. The Lord of the manor, owning extensive property within the borough and with the effective power of choosing both members of parliament, was the Duke of Northumberland.

By the Reform Act 1832, Newport was abolished as a separate borough, but the boundaries of Launceston were extended to include Newport. As Launceston's representation was halved by the same measure, the combined borough was thereafter represented by a single MP whereas previously there had been four members.

== Members of Parliament ==
=== 1529–1629 ===
- Constituency created 1529

Parliament	First member	Second member
Parliament of 1529	Simon Mountford	William Harris
Parliament of 1536	?	
Parliament of 1539	?	
Parliament of 1542	?	
Parliament of 1545	Richard Grenville	Walter Skinner
Parliament of 1547	Reginald Mohun	James Trewynnard
First Parliament of 1553	Henry Killigrew	Francis Roscarrock
Second Parliament of 1553	William Smith	John Gayer
Parliament of Apr 1554	Roger Tavernor	Thomas Prideaux
Parliament of Nov 1554	Robert Monson	Robert Browne
Parliament of 1554/5	William Stourton	Robert Monson
Parliament of 1558	Thomas Hungate	Thomas Roper
Parliament of 1559	(Richard) Grenville	Thomas Hickes
Parliament of 1563-1567	George Basset	Ayshton Ayleworth
Parliament of 1571	Edward Holte	Robert Colshill
Parliament of 1572-1581	George Basset	William Marbury
Parliament of 1584-1585	Robert Mordaunt	Walter Covert
Parliament of 1586-1587	John Osborne	Edward Winter
Parliament of 1588-1589	William Cavendish	Daniel Rogers
Parliament of 1593	Richard Stephens	Emanuel Chamond
Parliament of 1597-1598	Morgan Coleman	Edward Lewknor
Parliament of 1601	Tobie Matthew	Sir John Leigh
Parliament of 1604-1611	Sir Robert Killigrew	Sir Edward Seymour
Addled Parliament (1614)	Thomas Trevor	Sir Thomas Cheek
Parliament of 1621-1622	Sir Robert Killigrew	Sir Edward Barrett
Happy Parliament (1624-1625)	Sir John Eliot	Richard Estcourt
Useless Parliament (1625)	Sir John Eliot	Ralph Speccot
Parliament of 1625-1626	Sir Henry Hungate	Thomas Williams, junior
Parliament of 1628-1629	Piers Edgcumbe	Sir William Killigrew; Nicholas Trefusis
No Parliament summoned 1629-1640

=== 1640–1832 ===
Year	First member	First party	Second member	Second party
April 1640	Nicholas Trefusis	Parliamentarian	John Maynard	Parliamentarian
1640	Nicholas Trefusis	Parliamentarian	Paul Speccot	
November 1640	Richard Edgcumbe	Royalist	John Maynard	Parliamentarian
December 1640	Richard Edgcumbe	Royalist	Seat left vacant after Maynard chose to sit for Totnes	
January 1644	Edgcumbe disabled from sitting - seat vacant		Seat left vacant after Maynard chose to sit for Totnes	
1647	Sir Philip Perceval (died November 1647)		Nicholas Leach (died May 1647)	
1648	William Prynne		Alexander Pym	
December 1648	Prynne excluded in Pride's Purge - seat vacant		Pym not recorded as sitting after Pride's Purge	
1653	Newport was unrepresented in the Barebones Parliament and the First and Second Parliaments of the Protectorate			
January 1659	Sir John Glanville		William Morice	
May 1659	Not represented in the restored Rump			
April 1660	Sir Francis Drake		William Morice	
August 1660	Sir Francis Drake		Hon. Laurence Hyde	
1661	Sir Francis Drake		John Speccot	
1662	Piers Edgcumbe		John Speccot	
1667	Nicholas Morice		John Speccot	
1678	Nicholas Morice		Ambrose Manaton	
February 1679	John Coryton	Tory	Ambrose Manaton	
September 1679	William Coryton		Ambrose Manaton	
1681	William Morice		Ambrose Manaton	
1685	William Morice		John Speccot	Tory
1689	Sir William Morice		John Speccot	Tory
February 1690	The Viscount Newhaven		John Speccot	Tory
December 1690	John Morice		John Speccot	Tory
1695	John Morice		The Viscount Newhaven	
1698	John Morice		John Granville	
1699	Francis Stratford		John Granville	
January 1701	Francis Stratford		John Prideaux	
December 1701	William Pole		John Spark	
1702	Sir Nicholas Morice		John Spark	
1707	Sir Nicholas Morice		Sir John Pole	
1708	Sir Nicholas Morice		Sir William Pole	
1710	Sir Nicholas Morice		George Courtenay	
1713	Sir Nicholas Morice		Humphry Morice	Whig
April 1722	Sir Nicholas Morice		Sir William Pole	
December 1722	Sir Nicholas Morice		John Morice	
1726	Thomas Herbert		John Morice	
1727	Thomas Herbert		Sir William Morice	
1734	Thomas Herbert		Sir John Molesworth	
1740	Nicholas Herbert		Sir John Molesworth	
1741	Nicholas Herbert		Thomas Bury	
1754	John Lee		Edward Bacon	
1756	John Lee		Richard Bull	
1761	William de Grey		Richard Bull	
1770	Richard Henry Alexander Bennet		Richard Bull	
October 1774	Humphry Morice	Whig	Richard Bull	
December 1774	John Frederick		Richard Bull	
1780	Viscount Maitland	Whig	John Coghill	Tory
1784	Sir John Riggs-Miller		John Coghill	Tory
1785	Sir John Riggs-Miller		William Mitford	Tory
1790	Viscount Feilding		Charles Rainsford	
1796	William Northey	Tory	Joseph Richardson	
1803	William Northey	Tory	Edward Morris	Whig
1812	William Northey	Tory	Jonathan Raine	Tory
1826	Lord Charles Greatheed Bertie Percy	Tory	Jonathan Raine	Tory
1829	William Vesey-Fitzgerald	Tory	Jonathan Raine	Tory
July 1830	John Doherty	Tory	Jonathan Raine	Tory
December 1830	Sir Henry Hardinge	Tory	Jonathan Raine	Tory
1831	Sir Henry Hardinge	Tory	Viscount Grimston	Tory
1832	constituency abolished			
