= Zelman (surname) =

Zelman is a surname, and may refer to:

People

- Alberto Zelman (1874–1927), Australian musician and conductor
- Daniel Zelman (born 1967), American actor, screenwriter and television producer
- Kathleen Zelman, American nutritionist, dietitian and writer

== See also ==
- Zelman, given name
- Selman
- Zellmann
