= Jay Ansill =

American composer and musician

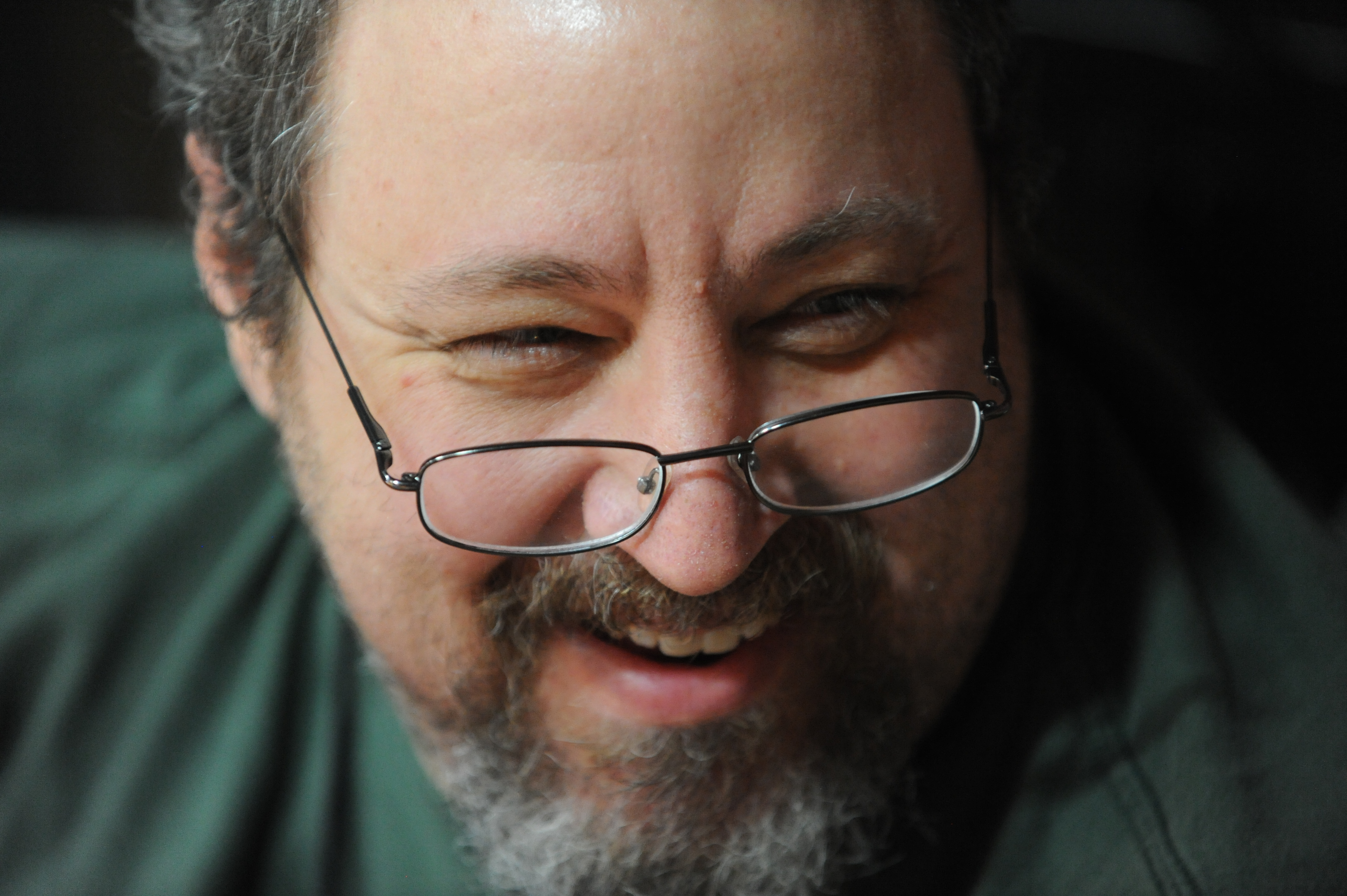

Jay Ansill (born 1961) is an American composer and folk musician, known primarily as a Celtic harpist and fiddler. Ansill has released several solo albums including Origami, A Lost World (an adaptation of poems by Robert Graves), and three privately released tributes to The Incredible String Band. Ansill has worked as a collaborator with Robin Williamson, Tony Trischka, Maria del Mar Bonet, Anthony Green Rodney Anonymous (of the Dead Milkmen), Marah, and Honeychurch.

Ansill is also an accomplished practitioner of Origami and has written two books on the subject; Mythical Beings and Lifestyle Origami. The two books were published as a single volume in 2004 as The Origami Sourcebook.

== Biography ==
Ansill was born in 1961 and raised in Cheltenham Township, Pennsylvania. He became interested in folk music while at Cheltenham High School and before long he was playing mandolin and fiddle at square dances and Irish Ceilis. While still in high school, he formed the Schuylkill Valley Nature Boys, a band that played all kinds of folk music and became well known in Philadelphia in the early 1980s for a station ID they recorded for WXPN FM.

As his range of abilities as a musician widened, Ansill developed an interest in composition. While never formally studying music, he has closely studied several composers with whom he felt an affinity, most notably David Amram, and has developed a unique approach to writing new music. Much of Ansill's writing centers on the Celtic harp, although recently he has been writing and arranging for strings and has written a woodwind quintet.

This music is firmly rooted in the traditional music of the United States and the British Isles, but combines elements of classical music, jazz and rock. It is music that is very modern, yet it strikes directly at the ancient heart of music. The emotional power and stylistic adventurousness of Ansill's music also owes a great deal to the literature of the twentieth century, particularly the work of Laura Riding, Robert Graves and James Joyce. Ansill was nominated twice as Best Folk Instrumentalist by the Philadelphia Music Foundation and in 1990 his album Origami, a collection of original compositions, was voted Best Folk Recording. He was also nominated for two Barrymore Awards in the same year for theatrical scores for productions of The Grapes of Wrath and Charlotte's Web at the Arden Theatre in Philadelphia. Ansill is a regular collaborator with Mabou Mines theater company.

The Folk Harp Journal says that "He has created a new language for the Celtic harp."

== Personal life ==
Jay Ansill is married to the painter Claudia Balant (a.k.a., Claude Elizabeth Balant), who has sung on some of his recordings.

== Career ==
In 1994, Ansill released Mind and Body, a collection of new original music that includes settings of poems by Yeats and Graves, as well as some music written for theater, and some music that expands the boundaries of the harp through the use of compelling rhythms and improvisation.

His CD, A Lost World, is a series of settings of poems by Robert Graves (I, Claudius, The White Goddess). This album features excellent performances by a variety of singers and musicians.

In 2004, he was awarded an Independence Foundation grant and spent two months in Mallorca and Barcelona learning traditional music from the region.

In 2007, one of his settings of poetry by Robert Graves (The Secret Land, translated into Catalan by the poet's daughter Lucia Graves) was recorded by Maria del Mar Bonet on her CD Terra Secreta.

In 2009, he composed and performed music for Mabou Mines' production of Lee Breuer's Pataphysics Penyeach

In 2009, Anne Hills performed four songs with the SW Michigan Symphony Orchestra, three of which featured music by Ansill and all of which were orchestrated by him.

In 2012, Jay launched his "Cheese Project", a collection of cover versions of cheesy pop songs from the 1960s and '70s.

In 2014, Jay and Anne performed a series of Jay's arrangements of settings of Graves Poems by Ivor Gurney, as well as a selection of his own settings for string quartet and occasionally Celtic harp in Deia Mallorca for an audience that included many family members and friends of Robert Graves.

In 2016, Jay and Anne Hills released Fragile Gifts, a collection of songs, mostly written by Anne and Jay was released. It features more "classical" arrangements for strings, brass and woodwinds in various combinations.

In 2017, Mabou Mines premier's Lee Breuer's Glass Guignol in NY, for which Jay is the composer.

== Recent activities ==
In 2018, Ansill provided the live music for Lane Savadove's event, Company.

In 2018 Jay Also composed and directed the music for EgoPo Classic Theater's production of John Guare's "Lydie Breeze Trilogy" directed by Lane Savadove.
