= Plympton Erle (constituency) =

Former parliamentary constituency in the UK

- Former borough constituency for the House of Commons

1295–1832
- Seats: Two

Plympton Erle, also spelt Plympton Earle, was a parliamentary borough in Devon. It elected two Members of Parliament (MPs) to the House of Commons from 1295 until 1832, when the borough was abolished by the Great Reform Act.

== Members of Parliament ==
=== 1295–1640 ===
Parliament	First member	Second member
1381	William Burlestone	Thomas Raymond
1386	John Golde	Richard Golde
1388 (Feb)	Ellis Beare	John Boys
1388 (Sep)	Peter Hadley	John Brendon
1390 (Jan)	John Selman I	John Lane
1390 (Nov)		
1391	John Selman I	John Jaycock
1393	Thomas Branscombe	John Jaycock
1394	John Selman I	John Jaycock
1395	Thomas Norris II	John Jaycock
1397 (Jan)	Thomas Norris II	William Selman I
1397 (Sep)		
1399		
1401		
1402	Thomas Topcliffe	...? More
1404 (Jan)		
1404 (Oct)		
1406	John Selman I	Thomas Prous
1407	William Isabel (Note: History of Parliament Online provides no other information on this MP other than "unidentified".)	Richard Hurston
1410		
1411	John Selman I	John Jaybien
1413 (Feb)		
1413 (May)	Thomas Barry	Roger Wyke
1414 (Apr)		
1414 (Nov)	John Selman II	John Serle
1415		
1416 (Mar)		
1416 (Oct)		
1417		
1419		
1420	William Selman II	John Selman II
1421 (May)	William Selman II	John Selman II
1421 (Dec)	William Selman II	John Selman II
1425	John Selman II	
1427	John Selman II	
1431	John Selman II	
1432	John Selman II	
1433	John Selman II	
1435	John Selman II	
1467	Thomas Fitzwilliam	
1510–1523	No names known	
1512	Richard Strode I	?
1515	?	
1523	?	
1529	Thomas Gregory	John Martin alias Honychurch I
1536	?	
1539	?	
1542	?	
1545	Edmund Sture	Adam Ralegh
1547	Thomas Dynham	Edward Darrell
1553 (Mar)	Sir John Pollard	Richard Strode II
1553 (Oct)	?John Foster	Reginald Mohum
1554 (Apr)	John Sparke	John Martin alias Honychurch II
1554 (Nov)	Richard Calmady	William Strowbridge
1555	Sir William Courtenay	Sir Arthur Champernowne
1558	Thomas Southcote	?Christopher Perne
1558–9	Sir Gawain Carew	Richard Strode II
1562–3	Nicholas Ogle	Thomas Percy, died and replaced 1566 by Edmund Wiseman
1571	Robert Guynes	Roger Hill
1572	Peter Osborne	William Strode
1584	John Hele	Hannibal Vyvyan
1586	Richard More	Jasper Cholmley
1588	Richard Grafton II	Edwin Sandys
1593	Edwin Sandys	Richard Southcote
1597	George Southcote	Edward Hancock
1601	Sir William Strode	John Hele
1604	Sir William Strode	Sir Henry Beaumont, replaced by John Hele
1614	Sampson Hele	Sir Warwick Hele
1621–1622	Sir William Strode	Sir Warwick Hele
1624	Sir Francis Drake	John Garret
1625	Sir William Strode	Sir Warwick Hele
1626	Sir William Strode	Sir Thomas Hele
1628–1629	Thomas Hele Bt	Sir James Bragge
1629–1640	No Parliaments summoned	

=== 1640–1832 ===
Year	First member	First party	Second member	Second party
April 1640	Sir Thomas Hele		Sir Richard Strode; Sir Nicholas Slanning (Double return)	
November 1640	Michael Oldisworth (Note: Oldisworth was also elected for Salisbury, which he chose to represent, and never sat for Plympton Erle)	Parliamentarian	Sir Nicholas Slanning (Note: Slanning was also elected for Penryn, which he chose to represent, and never sat for Plympton Erle)	Royalist
1640 (?)	Sir Thomas Hele	Royalist	Hugh Potter	Parliamentarian
January 1644	Hele disabled from sitting – seat vacant		Hugh Potter	Parliamentarian
1646	Christopher Martyn		Hugh Potter	Parliamentarian
December 1648	Christopher Martyn		Potter excluded in Pride's Purge – seat vacant	
1653	Plympton Erle was unrepresented in the Barebones Parliament and the First and Second Parliaments of the Protectorate			
January 1659	Christopher Martyn		Captain Henry Hatsell	
May 1659	Not represented in the restored Rump			
April 1660	Christopher Martyn		Sir William Strode	
1661	Thomas Hele		Sir William Strode	
1666	Sir Edmund Fortescue		Sir William Strode	
1667	Sir Nicholas Slanning		Sir William Strode	
1677	Sir Nicholas Slanning		Sir George Treby	
February 1679	Richard Hillersdon		Sir George Treby	
August 1679	John Pollexfen		Sir George Treby	
1685	Richard Strode		Sir Christopher Wren	
1689	Sir George Treby		John Pollexfen	
March 1690 (Note: The election of 1690 was declared void by the House of Commons, and a writ for a by-election was issued)	Richard Strode		George Parker	
April 1690	Sir George Treby		John Pollexfen	
1692	Sir Thomas Trevor		John Pollexfen	
1695	Sir Thomas Trevor		Courtenay Croker	
1698	Martin Ryder		Courtenay Croker	
1701	Richard Hele		Courtenay Croker	
1702	Richard Edgcumbe (Note: Edgcumbe was re-elected in 1734, but had also been elected for Lostwithiel, which he chose to represent, and did not sit in this Parliament for Plympton Erle)	Whig	Thomas Jervoise (Note: Jervoise was originally declared elected, but on petition (in a dispute over the franchise) his opponent Hele was declared to have been duly elected)	
1703	Richard Edgcumbe	Whig	Richard Hele	
1705	Richard Edgcumbe	Whig	Sir John Cope	
1708	Richard Edgcumbe	Whig	George Treby (Note: Treby was re-elected in 1727, but had also been elected for Dartmouth, which he chose to represent, and did not sit again for Plympton Erle)	
1728	Richard Edgcumbe	Whig	John Fuller	
1734	Richard Edgcumbe	Whig	Thomas Clutterbuck	
1735	Thomas Walker		Thomas Clutterbuck	
1741	Richard Edgcumbe	Whig	Thomas Clutterbuck	
May 1742	The Lord Sundon		Thomas Clutterbuck	
December 1742	The Lord Sundon		Hon. Richard Edgcumbe (Note: Richard Edgcumbe was re-elected in 1747, but had also been elected for Lostwithiel, which he chose to represent, and did not sit again for Plympton Erle)	
July 1747	Hon. George Edgcumbe (Note: George Edgcumbe was also elected for Fowey, which he chose to represent, and never sat for Plympton Erle)		Hon. Richard Edgcumbe	
December 1747	(Sir) William Baker (Note: Knighted November 1760)		George Treby	
1761	(Sir) William Baker		George Hele Treby	
1763	(Sir) William Baker		Paul Henry Ourry	
1768	William Baker		Paul Henry Ourry	
1774	Sir Richard Philipps, Bt		Paul Henry Ourry	
1775	Sir Richard Philipps, Bt		John Durand	
1779	William Fullarton		John Durand	
September 1780	Viscount Cranborne		Sir Ralph Payne	
November 1780	Hon. James Stuart		Sir Ralph Payne	
April 1784	Paul Treby Ourry		John Stephenson	
August 1784	John Pardoe		John Stephenson	
1790	The Earl of Carhampton	Tory	Philip Metcalfe	
1794	William Manning		Philip Metcalfe	
1796	William Adams		William Mitchell	
1799	William Adams		Richard Hankey	
1801	Sylvester Douglas, Lord Glenbervie		Richard Hankey	
1802	Edward Golding		Philip Metcalfe	
1806	Viscount Castlereagh		Sir Stephen Lushington	
1807	Viscount Castlereagh		Hon. William Harbord	
1810	Viscount Castlereagh		Henry Drummond	
October 1812	Ranald George Macdonald		George Duckett	
December 1812	Ranald George Macdonald		William Douglas	
1816	Ranald George Macdonald		Alexander Boswell	Tory
1821	Ranald George Macdonald		William Gill Paxton	Independent
1824	John Henry North	Tory	William Gill Paxton	Independent
June 1826	George Edgcumbe	Tory	Gibbs Antrobus	Tory
December 1826	Sir Charles Wetherell	Ultra-Tory	Gibbs Antrobus	Tory
August 1830	Viscount Valletort	Tory	Gibbs Antrobus	Tory
December 1830	Sir Compton Domvile	Tory	Gibbs Antrobus	Tory
1832	Constituency abolished			

== Elections ==
Elections in Plympton Erle were normally uncontested. The only contest between the Union of England and Scotland in 1707 and the abolition of the borough in 1832 was at the general election of 1802.

General election 1802: Plympton Erle (2 seats)
Party	Candidate	Votes	%	±%
N/A	Edward Golding	12	37.5	
N/A	Philip Metcalfe	12	37.5	
N/A	Captain Palmer	8	25.0	
Majority		4	12.5	
Turnout		32		
