= Richard Strode (died 1581) =

16th-century English politician

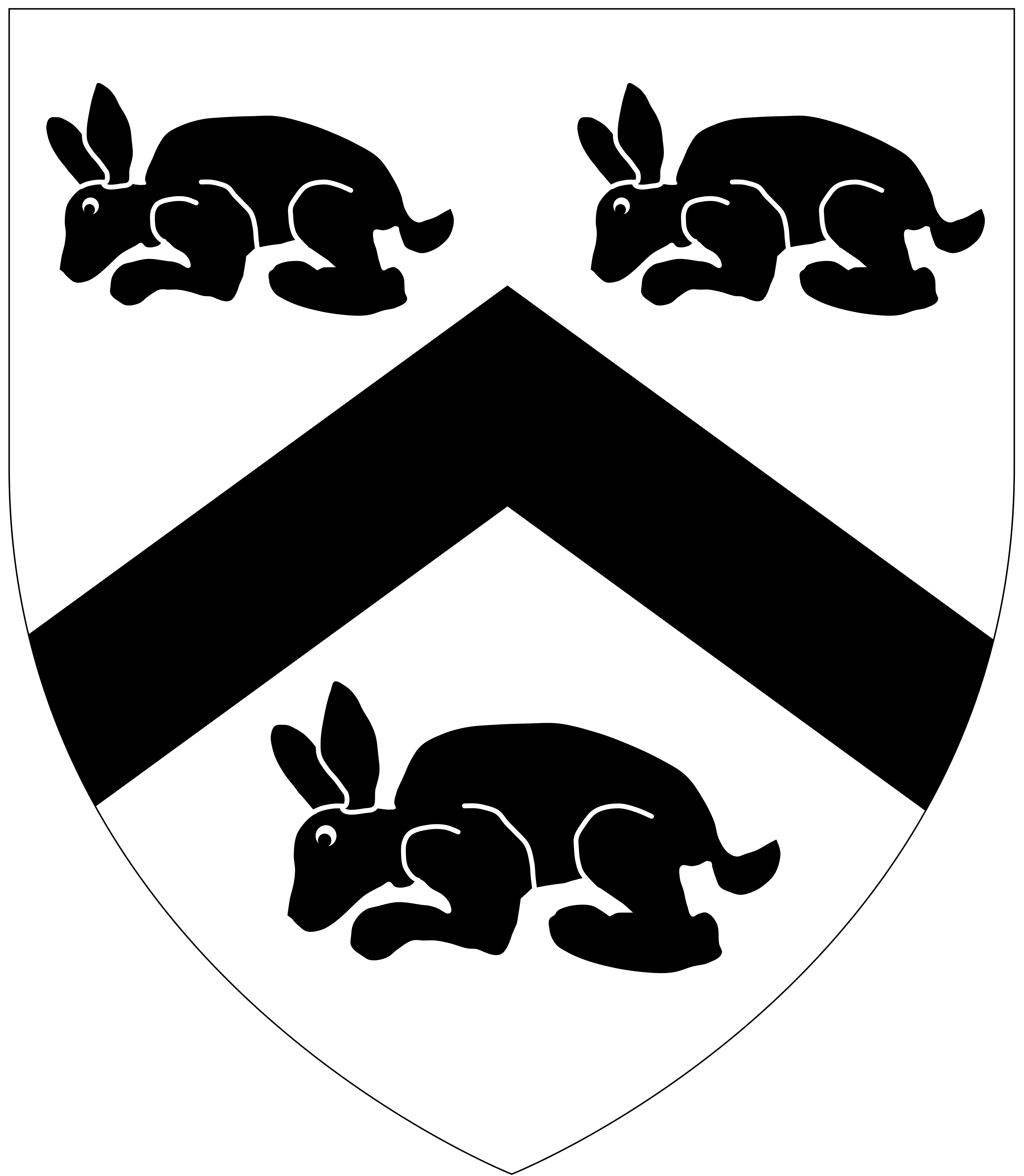
- Arms of Strode of Newnham in Devon: Argent, a chevron between three conies courant sable
- Born: 22 May 1528
- Died: 5 August 1581 (aged 53)
- Occupation: Politician
- Spouse: Frances Cromwell (m. 1560; died 1562)
- Children: William Strode
- Parents: William Strode; Elizabeth Courtenay

Richard Strode (22 May 1528 – 5 August 1581), of Newnham, in the parish of Plympton St Mary in Devon, was an English Member of Parliament for Plympton Erle in 1553 and 1559. He later served as escheator for Devon and Cornwall from 1565–1566.

He was the eldest son of William Strode of Newnham, Devon and Elizabeth, daughter of Philip Courtenay of Molland. He married, on 11 November 1560, Frances (died 7 February 1562), daughter of Gregory Cromwell, 1st Baron Cromwell and Elizabeth Seymour by whom he had a son: William Strode (1562–1637)

Strode died on 5 August 1581, two years after his father, leaving landed property worth over £60 per annum to his son and heir, William, then aged nineteen.

== Notes ==
Parliament of England
Preceded by Thomas Dynham; Edward Darrell	Member of Parliament for Plympton Erle; 1553; With: John Pollard	Succeeded by ?John Foster; Reginald Mohun
Preceded by Thomas Southcote ?Christopher Perne	Member of Parliament for Plympton Erle; 1559; With: Gawain Carew	Succeeded by Nicholas Ogle; Thomas Percy 1563–1566; Edmund Wiseman 1566–1567
