= Selman =

Selman may refer to:

== People with the surname ==
- Alan Selman (1941–2021), American mathematician
- Bart Selman, American computer scientist
- Bill Selman (born 1939), American ice hockey coach
- Courtenay Selman (born 1945), Barbadian cricketer
- David Selman (1878–1937), American film director
- Hafız Selman İzbeli, Turkish militiawoman
- Jim Selman (born 1942), American consultant, coach, and author
- JoAnn Dayton-Selman, American politician
- John Selman (disambiguation), multiple people
- Joshua Selman (born 1980), Nigerian televangelist
- Manuel Selman (born 1989), Chilean surfer
- Matt Selman (born 1971), American writer and producer
- Matty Selman, American lyricist
- Nick Selman (born 1995), English cricketer
- Redžep Selman (born 1986), Macedonian triple jumper
- Robert L. Selman (born 1942), American psychologist
- Rubén Selman (born 1963), Chilean football referee
- Sam Selman (born 1990), American baseball pitcher
- Shakera Selman (born 1989), West Indian cricketer
- William Selman (disambiguation), multiple people

== People with the first name ==
- Selman Ada (born 1953), Turkish composer, conductor and pianist
- Selman Akbulut (born 1949), Turkish mathematician
- Selman Kadria (1906–1938), Albanian land worker, folk singer and independence fighter in Kosovo
- Selman Kaygusuz (born 1963), Turkish wrestler
- Selman Mesbeh (born 1980), Qatari footballer
- Selman Reis (fl. 16th century), Ottoman admiral and former corsair
- Selman Riza (1908–1988), Albanian linguist and Albanologist
- Selman Selmanagić (1905–1986), Bosnian-German architect
- Selman Sevinç (born 1995), Dutch-Turkish footballer
- Selman Stërmasi (1908–1976), Albanian football player and coach
- Selman Uranues, Austrian physician and professor of surgery
- Selman Waksman (1888–1973), Jewish Russian Empire-born American inventor, biochemist and microbiologist

== Places ==
=== United States ===
- Selman, Florida
- Selman, Oklahoma
- Selman City, Texas
- Mount Selman, Texas

=== Elsewhere ===
- Selman, Eğil, Turkey
- Wadi es-Selman, Arabic name of Ayalon Valley, Israel

== See also ==
- Salman (disambiguation)
- Sleman, capital of Sleman Regency, Indonesia
- Selma (disambiguation)
- Zelman
