= Honeychurch =

Honeychurch may refer to:

- Honeychurch (band), an American band
- Honeychurch, Devon, a village in England
- Honeychurch (surname)
