= Holy Moses (disambiguation) =

Holy Moses is a German thrash metal band.

Holy Moses may also refer to:

- Holy Moses (American band), country rock band between 1968 and 1973
- Holy Moses (rocket)
- "Holy Moses", a song by Echo and the Bunnymen from their album Meteorites
- "Border Song", an Elton John song sometimes known as "Holy Moses", particularly the version recorded by Aretha Franklin

== See also ==
- Wholly Moses!, a movie starring Dudley Moore
