= 79th Regiment of Foot (disambiguation) =

The 79th Regiment of Foot was an infantry regiment of the British Army, raised in 1793 and that took part in the battles of Waterloo and Alma.

79th Regiment of Foot may also refer to:

- 79th Regiment of Foot (1745), or Edgcumbe's Regiment, a British Army unit that took part in the Jacobite rising of 1745
- 79th Regiment of Foot (1757), a British Army unit that took part in the Seven Years' War
- 79th Regiment of Foot (Royal Liverpool Volunteers), a British Army unit that saw service in the West Indies during the American Revolution
