= John Honychurch =

John Honychurch may refer to:

- John Martin (died 1545), alias John Honychurch, MP
- John Martin (died ?1592), alias John Honychurch, MP
