= Joseph Warder =

English writer on bees

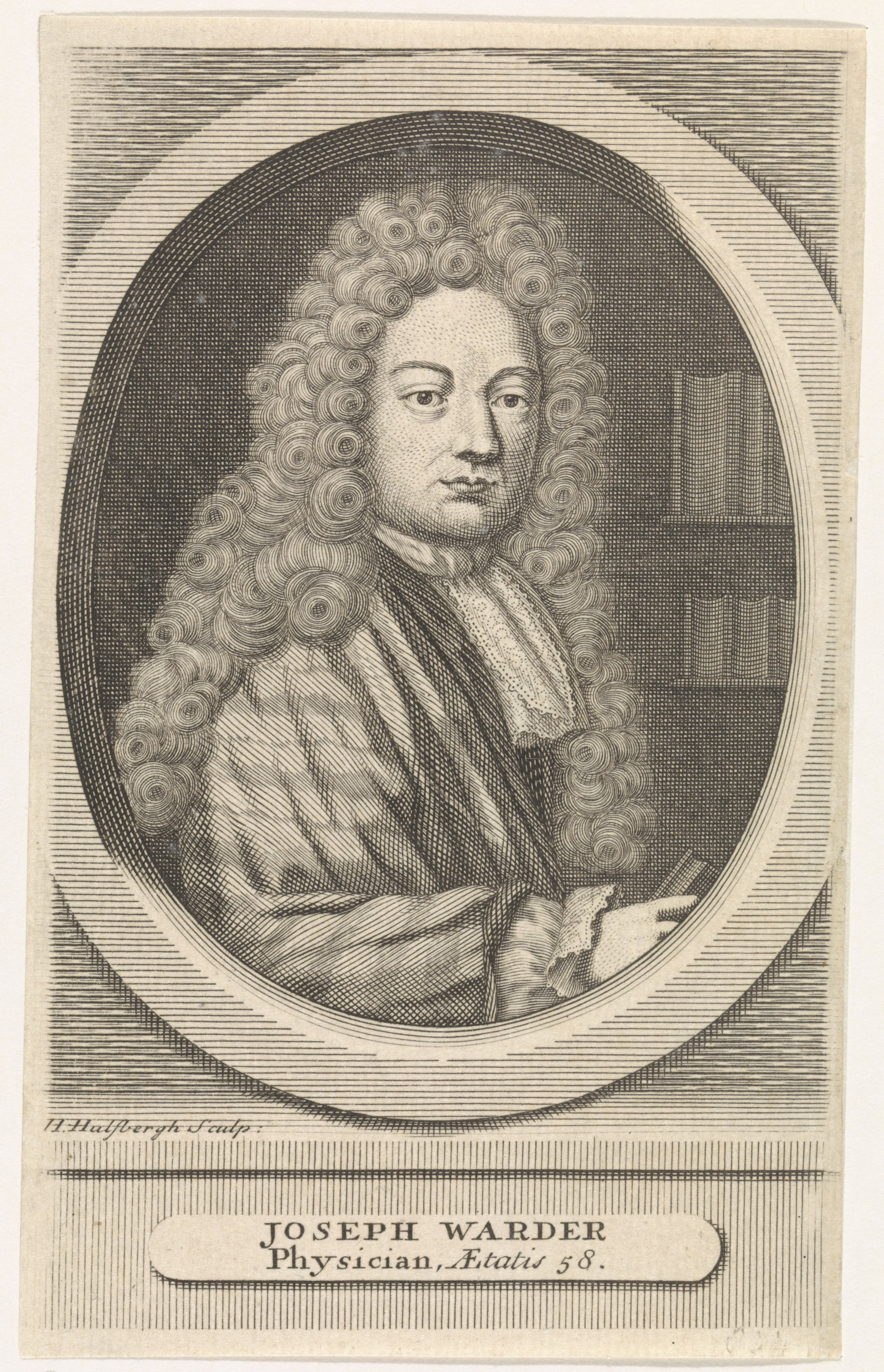
- Occupations: Writer, physician

Joseph Warder (fl. 1688–1718) was an English writer on bees.

== Biography ==
Warder was born before 1655, and took up his residence at Croydon about 1688. He practised there as a physician for over thirty years, and was a leading member of the independent congregation, the pastor of which, Richard Conder, was his son-in-law. Warder made an especial study of the habits of bees, and in 1693 he embodied the results of many years of observation in a treatise entitled "The True Amazons, or the Monarchy of Bees" (London, 8vo; the second edition of 1713 contains a dedication to Queen Anne). The work, which was considerably in advance of any former treatise and contained many curious particulars concerning the habits of bees as well as practical instructions for their management, went through nine editions, the last of which appeared in 1765 (London, 8vo). It remained the standard work on the subject until it was superseded by John Thorley's "Mελισσηλογία, or the Female Monarchy" (London, 1744, 8vo). A portrait of Warder, engraved by Henry Hulsberg, was prefixed to his book on bees.
