= John Selman (disambiguation) =

John Selman (1839-1896), was an outlaw and sometimes lawman of the Old West.

John Selman may also refer to:

- John Selman (died 1426), MP for Plympton Erle 1390-1411
- John Selman (fl. 1414–1435), MP for Plympton Erle 1414-1435
- John Selman (1744-1817), American privateer
