= Thomas Gregory =

Thomas Gregory may refer to:

== Thomas Gregory ==
- Thomas Watt Gregory (1861–1933), American attorney and United States Attorney General
- Thomas Gregory (MP), in 1581 MP for Plympton Erle
- Thomas Montgomery Gregory (1887–1971), dramatist, educator, social philosopher and activist

== Tom Gregory ==
- Tom Gregory (radio and TV announcer) (1927–2006), American radio and television announcer and news anchor
- Tom Gregory (producer) (born 1960), American entertainer and commentator
- Tom Gregory (singer) (born 1995), English singer songwriter
- Tom Gregory (swimmer) (born 1976), British swimmer and writer
