= William Selman =

William Selman may refer to two MPs for Plympton Erle:

- William Selman I
- William Selman II
