= Serle (surname) =

Serle is a surname, and may refer to:

- Ambrose Serle (1742–1812), British diarist
- John Serle (disambiguation), multiple people
- Percival Serle (1871–1951), Australian biographer
- Rebecca Serle, American writer
- William Serle (1912–1992), Scottish ornithologist, physician, and minister

== See also ==
- Mount Serle, South Australia
- Searle (surname)
