= Honychurch =

Honychurch is a surname. Notable people with the surname include:

- John Honychurch (disambiguation), multiple people
- Lennox Honychurch (born 1952), Dominican historian and politician
- William Honychurch (by 1489–1530/1531), English politician

== See also ==
- Honeychurch (surname)
