= Zelman =

See also Zelman (surname)

Zelman is a Jewish given name, cf. Zalman. Notable people with the name include:

- Zelman Cowen (1919–2011), former Governor-General of Australia
- Zelman Kleinstein (1910–?), chess master
- Zelman Passov (1905–1940), Soviet foreign intelligence official

== See also ==
- Zelman Symphony, Melbourne, Australia
- Selman
- Zellmann
