= Roger Hill (died 1608) =

English politician

Roger Hill (December 1545 – 1608) was an English politician.

He was a member (MP) of the parliament of England for Plympton Erle in 1571 and for Taunton in 1572.
