= John Searle (disambiguation) =

John Searle (1932–2025) was an American philosopher.

John Searle may also refer to:

- John Searle (businessman) (1901–1978), American heir, businessman and philanthropist
- John Preston Searle (1854-1922), American minister and educator
- John W. Searle (1905–1969), Australian minister and educator

== See also ==
- John Searles, American writer and book critic
- John Serle (disambiguation)
