= Colen Campbell =

Scottish architect and architectural writer

- Born: 15 June 1676; Brodie, Scotland
- Died: 13 September 1729 (aged 53); London, England
- Resting place: Westminster Abbey
- Occupation: Architect
- Buildings: Mereworth Castle; Stourhead; Houghton Hall; Burlington House; Wanstead House

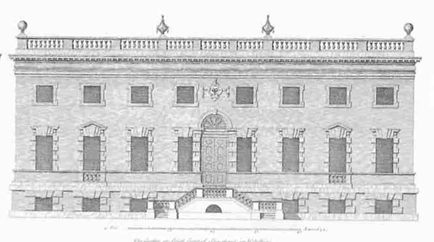
Palladian revival: Stourhead House, south facade, designed by Campbell and completed in 1720; a print from Vitruvius Britannicus

Colen Campbell (15 June 1676 – 13 September 1729) was a Scottish architect and writer best known for Vitruvius Britannicus, three volumes of high-quality engravings showing the great houses of the time.

== Early life ==
A descendant of the Campbells of Cawdor Castle, he is believed to be the Colinus Campbell who graduated from the University of Edinburgh in July 1695. He initially trained as a lawyer, being admitted to the Faculty of Advocates on 29 July 1702.

He travelled in Italy between 1695 and 1702, and is believed to be the Colinus Campbell who signed the visitor's book at the University of Padua in 1697. He is believed to have trained in and studied architecture under James Smith,

He invested in the Royal African Company, a major slave-trading business, selling a share with a book value of £1,000 (equivalent to £178,700 in 2025) in May 1720.

== Vitruvius Britannicus ==
=== Volumes by Campbell ===
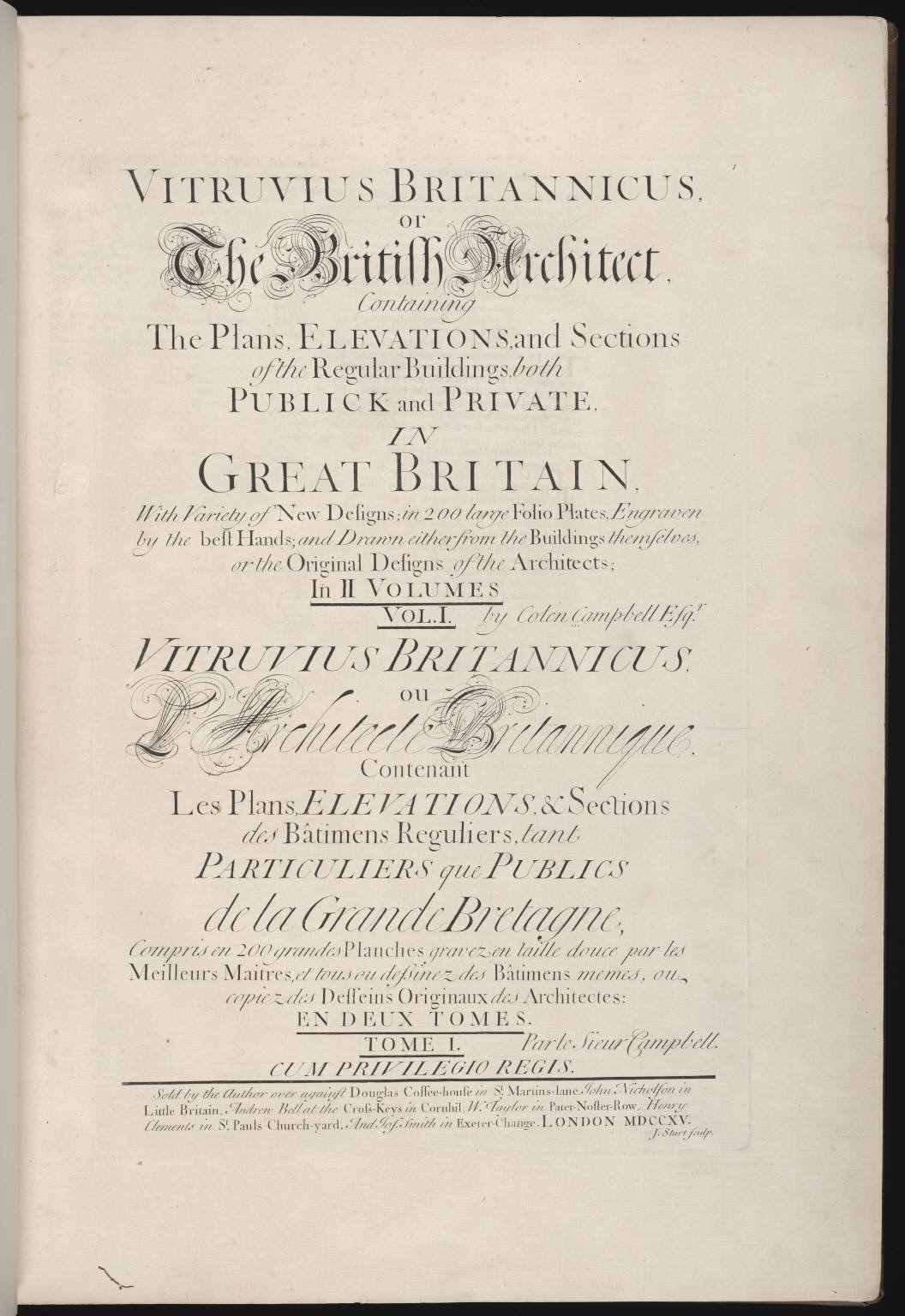
Title page of Campbell's Vitruvius Britannicus; or, The British architect, 1715–1725

Campbell's major published work, Vitruvius Britannicus, or the British Architect... appeared in three volumes between 1715 and 1725. This was the first architectural work to originate in England since John Shute's Elizabethan First Groundes. In the empirical vein, it was not a treatise but basically a catalogue of design, containing engravings of English buildings by Inigo Jones and Sir Christopher Wren, as well as by Campbell and other prominent architects of the era.

In the introduction that he appended and in the brief descriptions, Campbell emphasised the "excesses" of Baroque style and declared British independence from foreigners, while he dedicated the volume to the Hanoverian George I. The third volume (1725) has several grand layouts of gardens and parks, with straight allées, for courts and patterned parterres and radiating rides through wooded plantations, in a Baroque manner that was rapidly becoming old-fashioned.

Buildings were shown in plan, section and elevation, and some in a bird's-eye perspective. The drawings and designs contained in the book were under way before Campbell was drawn into the speculative scheme. The success of the volumes was instrumental in popularising neo-Palladian architecture in Great Britain and America during the 18th century. For example, Plate 16 of Vitruvius Britannicus, a rendering of Somerset House in London, was an inspiration for the American architect Peter Harrison when he designed the Brick Market in Newport, Rhode Island, in 1761.

Campbell was influenced as a young man by James Smith (c. 1645–1731), the pre-eminent Scots architect of his day, and an early neo-Palladian whom Campbell called "the most experienced architect" of Scotland (Vitruvius Britannicus, ii).

The somewhat promotional volume, with its excellently rendered engravings, came at a propitious moment at the beginning of a boom in country house and villa building among the Whig oligarchy. Campbell was quickly taken up by Lord Burlington, who replaced James Gibbs with Campbell at Burlington House in London and set out to place himself at the centre of English neo-Palladian architecture. In 1718, Campbell was appointed deputy to the amateur gentleman who had replaced Wren as Surveyor General of the Royal Board of Works, an appointment that Burlington is certain to have pressed, but a short-lived one. When Benson, the new Surveyor was turned out of office, Campbell went with him.

=== Later volumes by other authors ===
Later volumes published under the name 'Vitruvius Brittanicus' are not connected to Colen Campbell's work. In 1739 a volume was issued by Badeslade and Rocque, described as 'Volume 4'. However, this had little in common with Campbell, comprising mainly topographical perspective views of houses (54 plates). Between 1765 and 1771, Woolfe and Gandon published their 'Volumes 4 & 5' (79 and 75 plates). They discounted Badeslade's volume, believing their work to be a more correct continuation of Campbell, hence their numbering. The plates are mostly plans and elevations of buildings in the Palladian style from after 1750. The various Volumes are fully described in Harris.

== Major commissions ==
- Wanstead House, Essex, c. 1713/4–20 (illustrated left). In the first volume of Vitruvius Britannicus, the most influential designs were two alternatives for a palatial Wanstead House, Essex, for the merchant-banker Sir Richard Child, of which the second design was already under way when the volume was published. (Campbell claimed that Wanstead House had Great Britain's first classical portico, but this accolade probably belongs to The Vyne, Hampshire.)
- Burlington House, London, 1717. Remodelled the front and provided an entrance gateway for Richard Boyle, 3rd Earl of Burlington (Remodelled in 1868 and the gateway demolished.)
- Stourhead, Wiltshire, 1721–24, as a seat for the London-based banker Henry Hoare. Wings were added in the later 18th century, and Campbell's portico was not executed (though to his design) until 1841. The famous landscape garden round a lake, somewhat apart from the house, was developed after Campbell's death, by Henry Flitcroft.
- Pembroke House, Whitehall, London, for Henry Herbert, 9th Earl of Pembroke, 1723, a London house in a prominent location for the heir of Jones' Wilton House. It was rebuilt in 1757 and demolished in 1913. Lord Herbert (as he then was) was inspired by it to design the similar Marble Hill House at Twickenham for Henrietta Howard, Countess of Suffolk, the mistress of the future George II. (Marble Hill was a 5-bay palladian villa with central pediment, raised on a high basement, with clumped screens of trees and formal turfed terraces descending to the Thames, illustrated right, that manifest the earliest stages of the English landscape garden.)
- Houghton Hall, Norfolk, begun 1722, for Sir Robert Walpole, the Whig prime minister. Here Campbell was replaced by Gibbs, who capped the end pavilions with octagonal domes, and by William Kent, who designed the interiors.
- Mereworth Castle, Kent, 1722–25. Campbell's most overtly palladian design, based on Villa La Rotonda, capped with a dome with no drum, through which 24 chimney flues pass to the lantern.
- Waverley Abbey House, Surrey, c. 1723–25, for John Aislabie (largely altered).
- Nos 76 and 78 Brook Street, London W1, 1725–26. No. 76, which survives, was Campbell's own house, the designs for its interiors published in his Five Orders of architecture, (1729). It carries a blue plaque commemorating him.
- Compton Place, Eastbourne, Sussex, 1726 onwards, south front and extensive internal rebuilding for Sir Spencer Compton
- Plumptre House, Nottingham, 1724–30. Remodelled for John Plumptre MP.
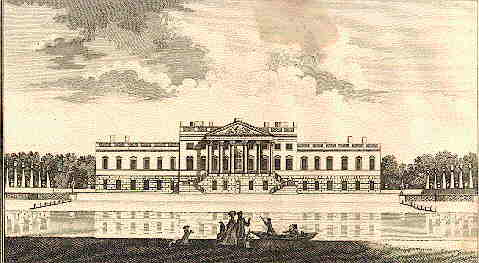
Wanstead House, as built, illustrated in Nathaniel Spencer, The Complete English traveller, London 1771

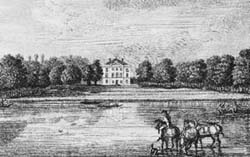
Marble Hill House, Twickenham

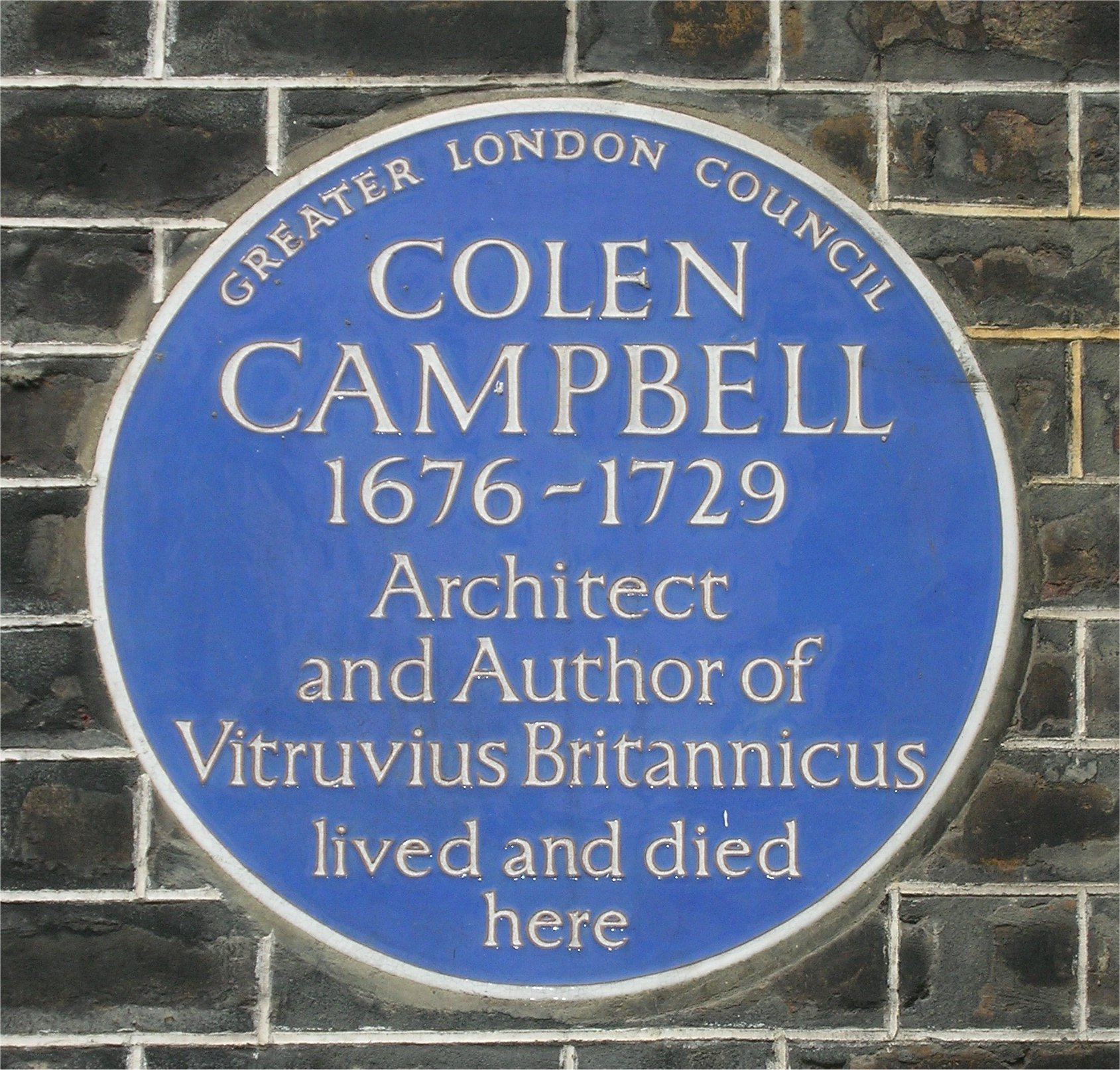
Blue plaque on 76 Brook Street, London W1

== List of architectural works ==
Campbell's architectural works include:

- Shawfield Mansion, Glasgow (1712) demolished 1792
- Wanstead House, Essex (1714–15) demolished 1822
- Hedworth House, Chester-le-Street (1726)
- Hotham House, Beverley (1716–17) demolished c.1766
- Burlington House, London, south front, and west wing (1717) subsequently extended and several occasions
- Burlington (Ten Acre Close) Estate, London, layout (1717–18)
- Burlington House, Great Gate and Street Wall (1718)
- Rolls House, Chancery Lane, London (1718), demolished 1895–96
- Ebberston Hall, Ebberston, Yorkshire, including cascade (1718)
- 34 Great Burlington Street, London (1718–19)
- 33 Great Burlington Street, London (1719–20)
- 32 Great Burlington Street, London (c.1720); this was Campbell's own house
- 31 Great Burlington Street, London (1719–24) rebuilt
- Burlington Girls' Charity School, Boyle Street, London (1719–21)
- Wimbledon Manor House, Surrey, for Sir Theodore Janssen (1720); completion uncertain
- Newby Park, (now Baldersby Park), near Topcliffe, Yorkshire (1720–21)
- Houghton Hall, Norfolk; one of several architects to work on the building (1721–22)
- Stourhead, Wiltshire; the portico part of Campbell's design was only added in 1840 (1721–24); interiors destroyed by fire 1902
- Mereworth Castle, Kent (1722–23)
- Pembroke Lodge, Whitehall, London; executed Henry Herbert, 9th Earl of Pembroke's design (c.1724), demolished 1756
- Plumptre House, Nottingham, (1724)
- Hall Barn, Buckinghamshire, garden buildings: Great Room (only partially survives), Temple of Venus, Obelisk & Doric Pavilion (1724)
- Waverley Abbey House, Surrey (c.1725), extended 1770, damaged by fire and rebuilt 1833
- Greenwich Hospital, Greenwich, London; additions to Queen Mary block and Queen Anne block (1726–29)
- Compton Place, Eastbourne, remodelled house (1726–29)
- 76 Brook Street, London, internal alterations (c.1726); became Campbell's new home
- Hackney House, Hackney, London (c.1727), demolished before 1842
- Althorp, Northamptonshire, new stables, loggia gate (c.1729–33)
- Studley Royal Park, Yorkshire, the stables (c.1729) built after his death by Roger Morris
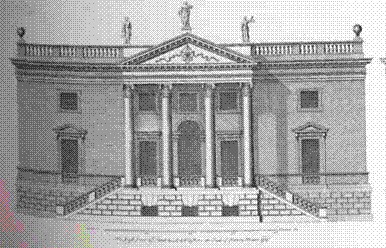
Design for Stourhead in Wiltshire, Vitruvius Britannicus vol. 3, 1725

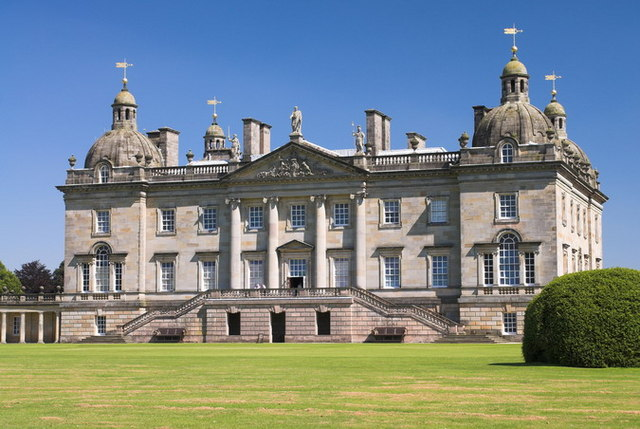
Houghton Hall in Norfolk; James Gibbs added the domes to Campbell's design

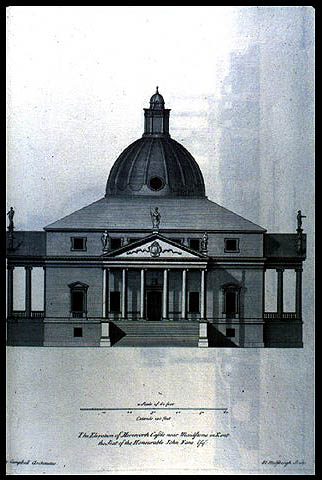
Mereworth Castle in Kent, Vitruvius Britannicus vol 2, 1720

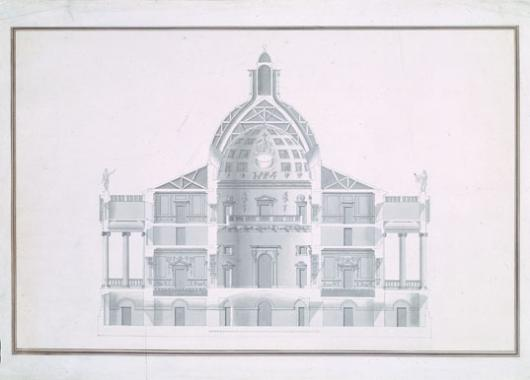
Cross-section, Mereworth Castle, Vitruvius Britannicus vol 2, 1720

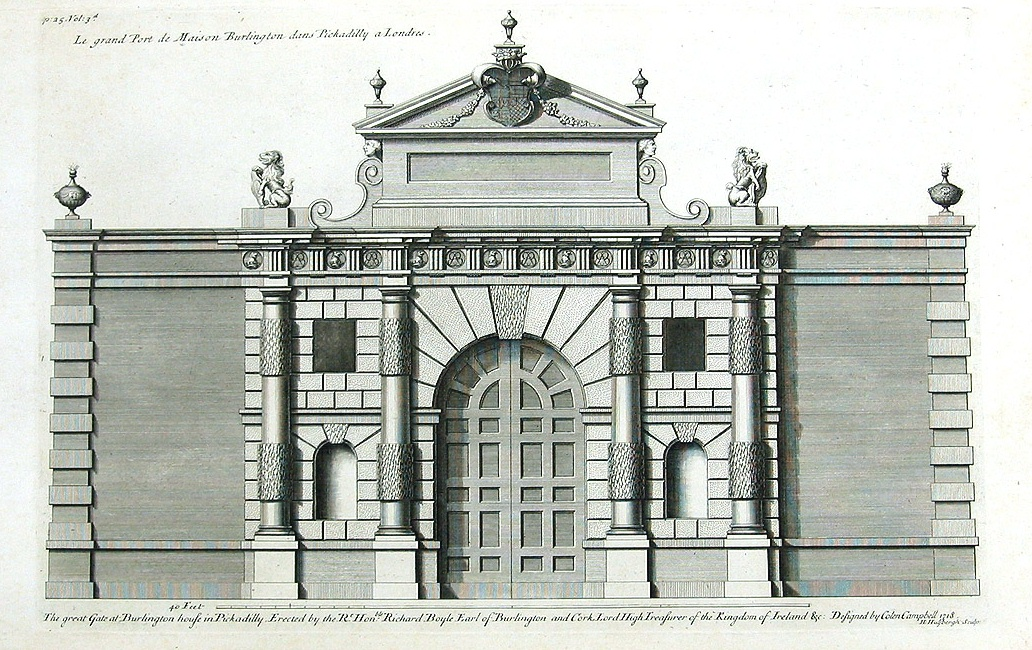
Gate, Burlington House, London, Vitruvius Britannicus vol 2, 1720 (demolished)

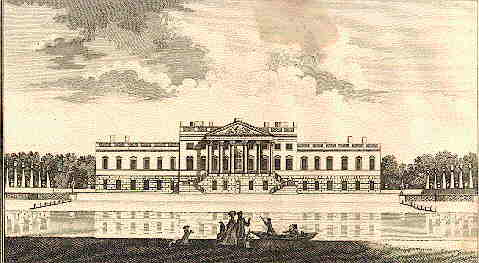
Wanstead House in Essex (demolished)

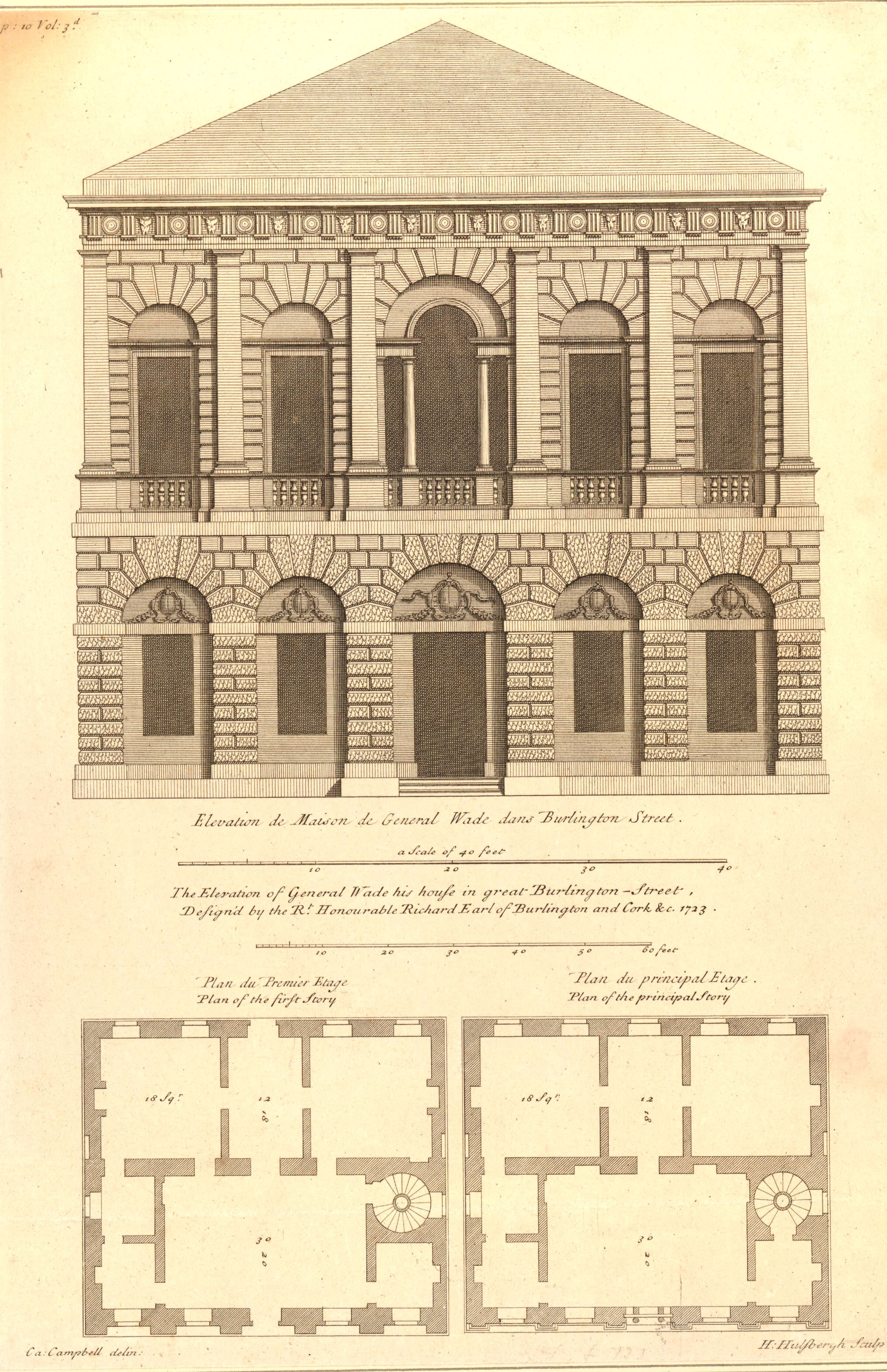
The Elevation of General Wade, his house in great Burlington Street, London, Vitruvius Britannicus, vol. 3, 1723. Engraving by Henry Hulsbergh
