= John Sparke (died 1566) =

Member of the Parliament of England

John Sparke (died 1566) was an English politician who sat in the House of Commons in 1554.

Sparke was originally from Nantwich, Cheshire, and settled at Plympton St. Maurice. He was collector of the subsidy for Plympton Erle in 1523. In 1554, he was elected Member of Parliament for Plympton Erle. He was mayor of Plympton Erle later in the same year.

Sparke died in 1566 and was buried in the church of Plympton St Maurice on 11 July 1566.

Sparke married Jane Moore of Devon and had four sons. She was buried on 29 December 1583.

Parliament of England
Preceded by John Foster; Reginald Mohun	Member of Parliament for Plympton Erle; 1554; With: John Martin alias Honychurch	Succeeded by Richard Calmady; William Strowbridge
