= Barbara Keith =

American folk-rock singer-songwriter (born 1946)

- Born: Barbara Allen Keith; 1946 (age 79–80); Deerfield, Massachusetts, U.S.
- Genres: Folk-rock, country rock
- Occupations: Singer-songwriter, guitarist
- Instruments: Vocals, guitar
- Years active: c.1967–1973, 1998–present
- Website: stonecoyotes.com

Barbara Allen Keith (born 1946) is an American folk-rock singer-songwriter who recorded two solo albums in the late 1960s and early 1970s. She re-emerged in the 1990s with her family band, The Stone Coyotes, who have released 12 albums and continue to perform.

== Early life and career ==
Born in Deerfield, Massachusetts, she performed at the Cafe Wha? in Greenwich Village before making her first recordings in 1968 as a singer with the band Kangaroo. The other band members were multi-instrumentalist John Hall, guitarist Teddy Speleos, and drummer/vocalist N. D. Smart (previously of the Remains). They released a self-titled album on MGM Records, on which Keith wrote two songs, "Daydream Stallion" and "The Only Thing I Had". The band split up in early 1969. Hall moved on to form the band Orleans before becoming a politician; Smart later formed Mountain with Leslie West; and Speleos formed the band Holy Moses with singer-songwriter Billy Batson.

== Solo career ==
Keith recorded her debut self-titled solo album at A & R Studios in New York in October 1969. Produced by Peter Asher, it was released on the Verve Forecast label, but was a commercial failure. Reviewer Richie Unterberger described the album as "slightly above-average late-'60s singer/songwriter music, with a strong country-rock flavor", and compared her singing style to that of Marianne Faithfull.

Her second album, also self-titled, was recorded with leading session musicians including Lowell George, Spooner Oldham, Pete Kleinow, Lee Sklar and others, and was released by Reprise Records in 1972. The producer was Larry Marks, whose songwriting partner Doug Tibbles married Keith in 1973. The album contained a cover of Bob Dylan's "All Along the Watchtower" – released as a single – along with self-penned songs including "Free the People", also issued as a single and later recorded by Delaney and Bonnie, Barbra Streisand, Sherbet and others; "The Bramble and the Rose", covered by Patty Loveless; and "Detroit or Buffalo", recorded by Melanie. Reviewer Ronnie Lankford described the album as "a fine effort highlighted by great writing and solid production", performed by "an expressive, soulful singer". Keith later said: "Somehow, even though there were some great studio musicians on that album... it didn't feel like ME completely yet, and so we gave back the album advance money and quit." As a result, Warner/Reprise failed to promote the record and it was quickly withdrawn.

Keith and Tibbles continued to write and perform together, while withdrawing from the music scene into family life in Massachusetts. Their song "A Stone's Throw Away" from her second solo album was recorded by The Dillards in 1975, and by Valerie Carter in 1977. "Pride of Franklin County" was recorded by Tanya Tucker in 1976.

== The Stone Coyotes ==
In the 1990s, Barbara Keith and Doug Tibbles formed The Stone Coyotes, with Tibbles' son (Keith's stepson) John Tibbles, and began playing occasional gigs and recording. Keith plays electric guitar and sings, Doug Tibbles plays drums, and John plays bass. When playing at the Troubadour in Los Angeles, they were seen by writer Elmore Leonard, who used them as the model for the band in his 1999 novel Be Cool. The band continued to perform and record for many years. Doug Tibbles died on April 12, 2023.

== Discography ==
=== Albums ===
==== Kangaroo ====
The band Kangaroo released one self-titled album on MGM Records in 1968.

1. "Such a Long Long Time" (Hall) (2:15)
2. "You're Trying to Be a Woman" (Hall) (2:19)
3. "Daydream Stallion" (Keith) (3:56)
4. "Make Some Room in Your Life" (Hall) (2:42)
5. "Frog Giggin" (Smart) (4:23)
6. "You Can't Do This to Me" (Hall) (3:47)
7. "If You Got Some Love in Mind" (Hall) (2:42)
8. "I Never Tell me Twice" (Hall) (2:25)
9. "Tweed's Chicken Inn" (Smart) (3:03)
10. "Happy Man" (Speleos) (3:07)
11. "The Only Thing I Had" (Keith) (4:05)
12. "Maybe Tomorrow" (Hall) (2:15)

==== Barbara Keith ====
1969, Verve Records; produced by Peter Asher. All tracks written by Keith except where stated.

1. "Ferris Wheel"
2. "Walk a Little Closer" (Gutcheon)
3. "To See the Morning Gone"
4. "Stranger Song"
5. "Midnight Vow"
6. "My Easy Days"
7. "Ones who Really Care"
8. "Lullaby"
9. "As if you Were my Own"
10. "Tie Me Down"
11. "Blue Eyed Boy"
12. "Big Black Deep"

==== Barbara Keith ====
1972, Reprise Records All tracks written by Keith except where stated.

1. "All Along the Watchtower" (Bob Dylan) (3:23)
2. "Rolling Water" (3:09)
3. "The Bramble and the Rose" (2:49)
4. "Burn the Midnight Oil No More" (3:03)
5. "Free the People" (3:49)
6. "Detroit or Buffalo" (4:29)
7. "The Road I Took to You" (3:17)
8. "Shining All Along" (3:04)
9. "Rainy Nights Are All the Same" (3:21)
10. "A Stone's Throw Away" (Keith, Tibbles) (4:43)
