= Thomas Barry (English politician) =

English politician

Thomas Barry was an English politician who was MP for Plympton Erle in May 1413 and married Isabel.
