= Richard More (died 1595) =

English politician

Richard More (died 1595) was an English politician.

More was an MP for Grantham in 1589 and Plympton Erle in 1586.
