= Thomas Walker (died 1748) =

British Whig politician

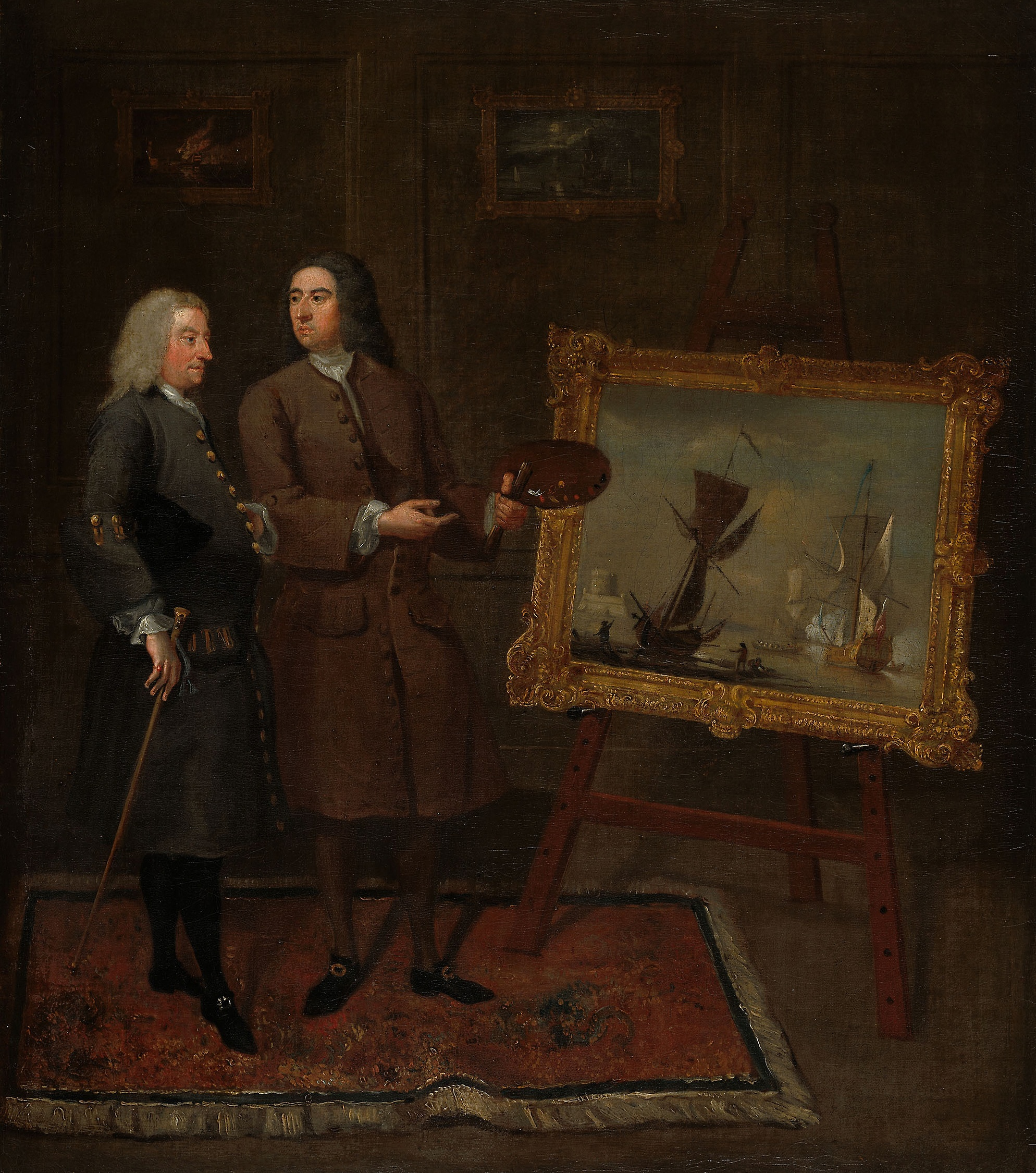
Thomas Walker and Peter Monamy. Painting by Gawen Hamilton.

Thomas Walker (c. 1664–1748), of Wimbledon, Surrey, was a British Whig politician who sat in the House of Commons between 1733 and 1747.

Walker was probably the son of Edward Walker of St Sepulchre's, London, and his wife Susanna Winchurst. He became immensely wealthy, probably as a money lender.

In November 1714, Walker was appointed Commissioner of Customs. He changed the post for that of Surveyor General of crown lands in October 1731, as the latter post did not disqualify him from sitting in the House of Commons. He went first into Parliament at the age of 69. He was returned unopposed as Member of Parliament for West Looe as a government nominee at a by-election on 26 January 1733. He made his only known speech in 1733, when as a former commissioner of customs he defended the then commissioners against attacks on them by the Opposition. He did not stand at the 1734 British general election but was returned unopposed as MP for Plympton Erle at a by-election on 21 February 1735. At the 1741 British general election he was returned unopposed as MP for Helston. He did not stand in 1747.

Walker bought the Old Park estate in Wimbledon in 1738 and probably lived at Westside House. He died unmarried on 22 October 1748, aged 84 and was buried in the churchyard of St Mary's Wimbledon. Horace Walpole called him "a kind of toad-eater to Sir Robert Walpole and Lord Godolphin". He went frequently to the races at Newmarket, and was considered a notorious usurer.

Parliament of Great Britain
Preceded by Edward Trelawny; John Willes	Member of Parliament for West Looe; 1733–1734; With: John Willes	Succeeded by Edward Trelawny; John Willes
Preceded by Richard Edgcumbe; Thomas Clutterbuck	Member of Parliament for Plympton Erle; 1735–1741; With: Thomas Clutterbuck	Succeeded by Richard Edgcumbe; Thomas Clutterbuck
Preceded by John Evelyn; John Harris	Member of Parliament for Helston; 1741 –1747; With: Francis Godolphin	Succeeded by Francis Godolphin (Sir) John Evelyn
