= John Serle =

John Serle may refer to:

- John Serle (MP for Plympton Erle), 1414–1449, MP for Plympton Erle
- John Serle (died c. 1456), MP for Portsmouth

== See also ==
- John Searle (1932–2025), American philosopher
- John Searle (disambiguation)
