= John Fuller (died 1744) =

British diplomat and politician

John Fuller (c. 1679–1744) of Great Yarmouth, Norfolk was a British diplomat and politician who sat in the House of Commons from 1728 to 1734

Fuller was the second, but eldest surviving son of Samuel Fuller, MP, merchant and mayor of Yarmouth, and his wife Rose Huntington, daughter of Richard Huntington, MP. He was educated at Colchester and Yarmouth, and was admitted at Caius College, Cambridge on 14 May 1695, aged 15. In about 1718, he was appointed Consul at Leghorn. In 1721, his father died, and in 1722 he resigned his post at Leghorn and returned to England.

Fuller stood at Yarmouth at the 1727 British general election challenging the Townshend-Walpole interest, but was unsuccessful. He was apparently bought off with a government seat at Plympton Erle where he was returned as Member of Parliament at a by-election on 29 February 1728. He voted against the Administration in all recorded divisions. He did not stand again at the 1734 British general election.

Fuller was probably unmarried and died on 22 March 1744.

Parliament of Great Britain
Preceded by Richard Edgcumbe; George Treby	Member of Parliament for Plympton Erle; 1728–1734; With: Richard Edgcumbe	Succeeded by Richard Edgcumbe; Thomas Clutterbuck
