= Edmund Sture =

16th-century English politician

Edmund Sture (1509/10 – 22 February 1560), of Bradley in North Huish, Devon and the Middle Temple, London, was an English politician.

He was a member (MP) of the Parliament of England for Plympton Erle in 1545, for Totnes in 1547, for Dartmouth in April 1554 and Exeter in 1555.
