= Richard Edgcumbe, 1st Baron Edgcumbe =

British Army officer and politician (1680–1758)

The Right Honourable The Lord Edgecumbe
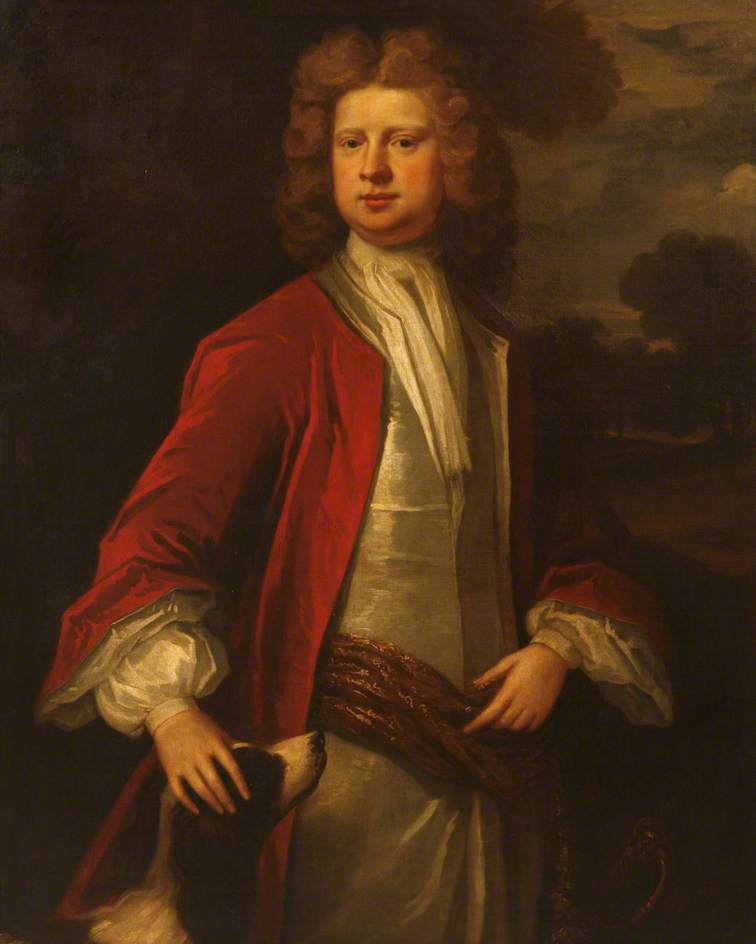
- Portrait of Edgcumbe
- Born: 23 April 1680
- Died: 22 November 1758 (aged 78)
- Occupation: Politician
- Spouse: Matilda Furnese
- Children: 3, including Richard and George
- Parent(s): Sir Richard Edgcumbe; Lady Anne Montagu

Major-General Richard Edgcumbe, 1st Baron Edgcumbe, PC (23 April 1680 – 22 November 1758) was a British Army officer and Whig politician who sat in the English and British House of Commons from 1701 until 1742 when he was raised to the peerage as Baron Edgcumbe. He is memorialised by Edgecombe County, North Carolina.

== Early life ==
He was the son of Sir Richard Edgcumbe and Lady Anne Montagu, daughter of Edward Montagu, 1st Earl of Sandwich.

== Career ==
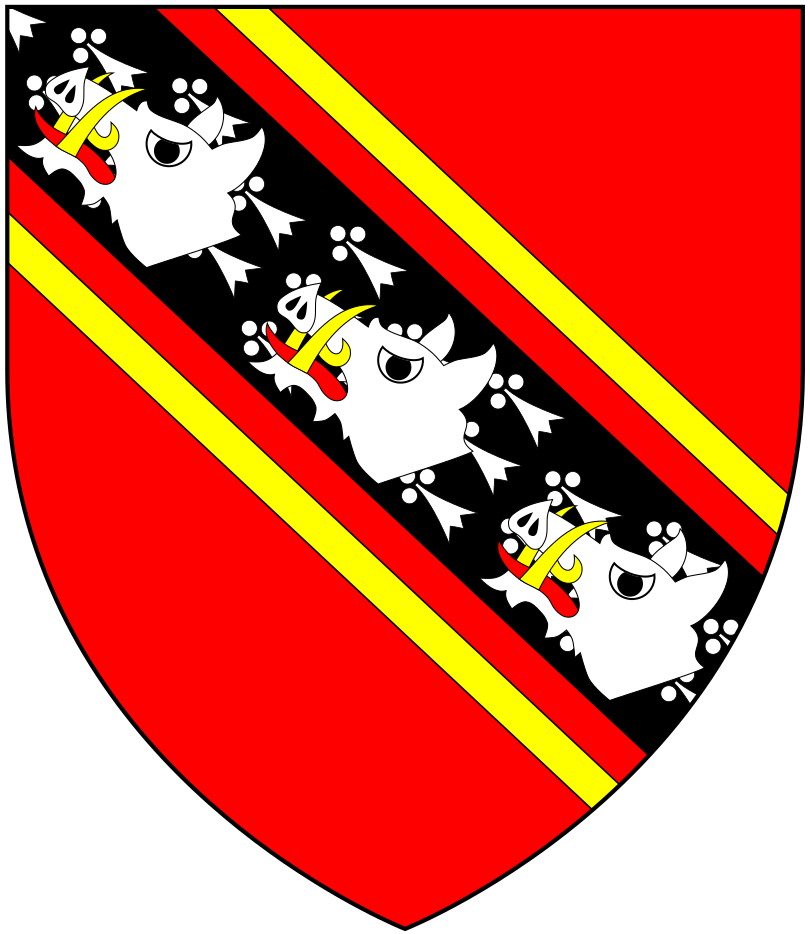
Arms of Edgcumbe: Gules, on a bend ermines cotised or three boar's heads couped argent

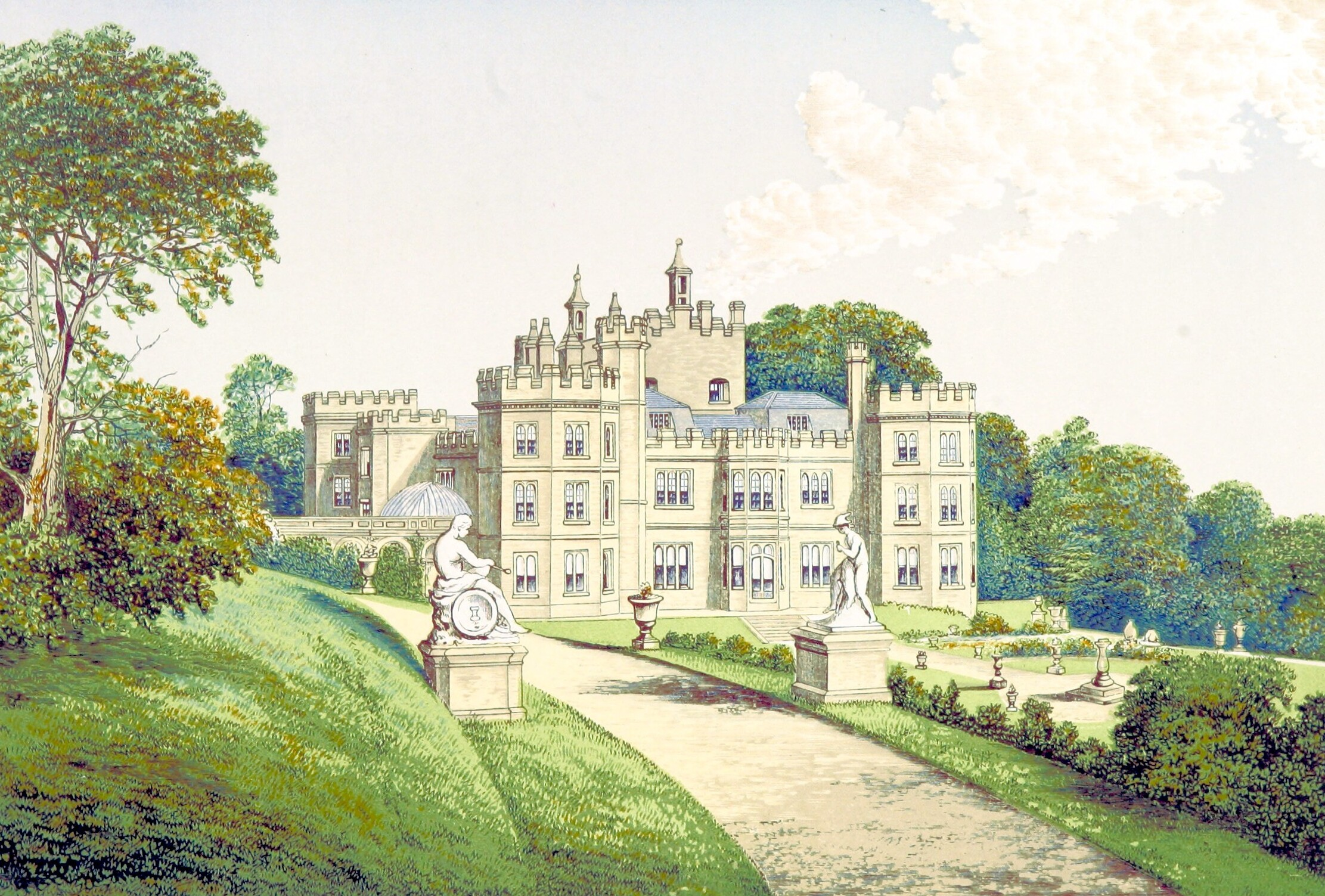
Mount Edgcumbe House, Devon, 1869

In 1694, at the age of 14, Edgcumbe succeeded his brother, Piers Edgcumbe, in the family estates. He was admitted at Trinity College, Cambridge in 1697 and travelled abroad in 1699.

Edgcumbe was returned unopposed as MP for Cornwall at a by-election on 25 June 1701 but never took his seat as Parliament had been prorogued. At the general election later in 1701, he was returned unopposed as MP for St Germans. Edgcumbe was elected MP for Plympton Erle at the 1702 English general election, probably on the Treby interest. He was re-elected at the 1705 English general election in a contest, and voted for the Court candidate as Speaker on 25 October 1705. Edgcumbe was returned as a Whig at the 1708 British general election, and was several times a teller for the Whigs. Although absent from the vote on the impeachment of Dr Sacheverell, he was attacked by the mob supporting Dr Sacheverell in Cornwall. Edgcumbe was returned again at the 1710 British general election but his behaviour in parliament appears contradictory. He was however to be one of the leaders of the great Whig procession through the City of London, which was banned by the government. Edgcumbe voted for the motion ‘No Peace Without Spain’ on 7 December 1712 and divided against the French commerce bill on 18 June 1713. He was returned again at the 1713 British general election, and voted against the expulsion of Richard Steele.

At the 1715 British general election, Edgecombe was returned unopposed as MP for Plympton Erle. He was appointed lord of the treasury in 1716. Edgcumbe surrendered the post when he went into opposition with Walpole in 1717, but was re-instated in 1720. He was returned again for Plympton Erle at the 1722 British general election. Edgcumbe held his post at the Treasury until 1724 when he was appointed Vice-Treasurer of Ireland, a post he held until 1742. He was returned again at the 1727 British general election, and was appointed a Privy Councillor for Ireland on 28 November 1727. At the 1734 British general election, Edgcumbe was returned as MP for Plympton Erle and Lostwithiel and chose to sit for Lostwithiel. He was Lord Warden of the Stannaries from 1734 to 1747. Edgcumbe was elected again for Plympton Erle at the 1741 general election and sat until he was raised to the peerage in 1742 and vacated his seat in the House of Commons. Edgcumbe was a faithful follower of Sir Robert Walpole, in whose interests he managed the elections for the Cornish boroughs, and his elevation to the peerage was designed to prevent him from giving evidence about Walpole's expenditure of the secret service money. In 1742, Edgcumbe was appointed Lord Lieutenant of Cornwall and Chancellor of the Duchy of Lancaster, which posts he held for the rest of his life. He became colonel of the British Army's 79th Regiment of Foot in 1745 and became major general in 1755. He was appointed Chief Justice in Eyre, north of Trent in January 1758.

== Marriage and children ==
Edgcumbe married Matilda Furnese (died 1721), a daughter of Sir Henry Furnese, 1st Baronet (c. 1658 – 1712), of Waldershare in Kent, by whom he had four children, including:

- Henry Edgcumbe, eldest son, died in infancy,
- Richard Edgcumbe, 2nd Baron Edgcumbe (1716–1761), eldest surviving son and heir, who died unmarried;
- George Edgcumbe, 3rd Baron Edgcumbe, 1st Earl of Mount Edgcumbe (1720–1795), who succeeded his brother and was created Earl of Mount Edgcumbe in 1789.

== Notes ==
Parliament of England
| Preceded by Hugh Boscawen; John Speccot | Member of Parliament for Cornwall; 1701; With: John Speccot | Succeeded by John Granville; James Buller |
| Preceded by Henry Fleming; Daniel Eliot | Member of Parliament for St Germans; 1701–1702; With: Henry Fleming | Succeeded by Henry Fleming; John Anstis |
| Preceded by Courtenay Croker; Richard Hele | Member of Parliament for Plympton Erle; 1702–1707; With: Thomas Jervoise 1702–1703; Richard Hele 1703–1705; Sir John Cope 1705–1707 | Succeeded by Parliament of Great Britain |
Parliament of Great Britain
| Preceded by Parliament of England | Member of Parliament for Plympton Erle; 1707–1734; With: Sir John Cope 1707–1708; George Treby 1708–1728; John Fuller 1728–1734 | Succeeded by Thomas Clutterbuck |
| Preceded by Anthony Cracherode; Edward Walpole | Member of Parliament for Lostwithiel; 1734–1741; With: Philip Lloyd 1734–1735; The Lord Ducie 1735–1736; Sir John Crosse, Bt 1736–1741 | Succeeded by Sir John Crosse, Bt; Sir Robert Salusbury Cotton, Bt |
| Preceded by Thomas Clutterbuck; Thomas Walker | Member of Parliament for Plympton Erle; 1741–1742; With: Thomas Clutterbuck | Succeeded by Thomas Clutterbuck; The Lord Sundon |
Honorary titles
| Vacant Title last held by The Earl of Radnor | Custos Rotulorum of Cornwall; 1726–1758 | Succeeded by The Lord Edgcumbe |
| Vacant Title last held by The Earl of Radnor | Lord Lieutenant of Cornwall; 1742–1758 | Succeeded by The Lord Edgcumbe |
Court offices
| Preceded by The Viscount Falmouth | Lord Warden of the Stannaries; 1734–1737 | Vacant Title next held by Thomas Pitt |
Political offices
| Preceded by The Earl of Cholmondeley | Chancellor of the Duchy of Lancaster; 1743–1758 | Succeeded by The Earl of Kinnoull |
Legal offices
| Preceded by The Duke of Somerset | Justice in Eyre north of the Trent; 1758 | Succeeded by The Lord Sandys |
Peerage of Great Britain
| New title | Baron Edgcumbe; 1742–1758 | Succeeded by Richard Edgcumbe |
