= John Plumptre (younger) =

British politician (1711–1791)

John Plumptre (10 February 1711 – 23 February 1791), British politician, was the first son of John Plumptre and Arabella Molyneux.

He married twice:

- Margaret Bridges (d. 8 Jan. 1756) on 12 Sep 1750, daughter of Sir Brook Bridges, 2nd Baronet, sister of Sir Brook Bridges, 3rd Baronet.
- Mary Glover, on 14 Sep 1758, daughter of Philips Glover of Wispington, Lincolnshire.

He entered Parliament as Member of Parliament (MP) for Member for Penryn in 1758.

He was appointed Commissioner of Stamps in 1739, and held this position until November 1753.

He lived at Plumptre House, Nottingham.

Parliament of Great Britain
Preceded by Richard Edgcumbet	Member of Parliament for Penryn; 1758-1761	Succeeded by Sir Edward Turner
Preceded by Sir Willoughby Aston	Member of Parliament for Nottingham; 1761-1774	Succeeded by Sir Charles Sedley
