= Richard Edgcumbe, 2nd Baron Edgcumbe =

British nobleman and politician

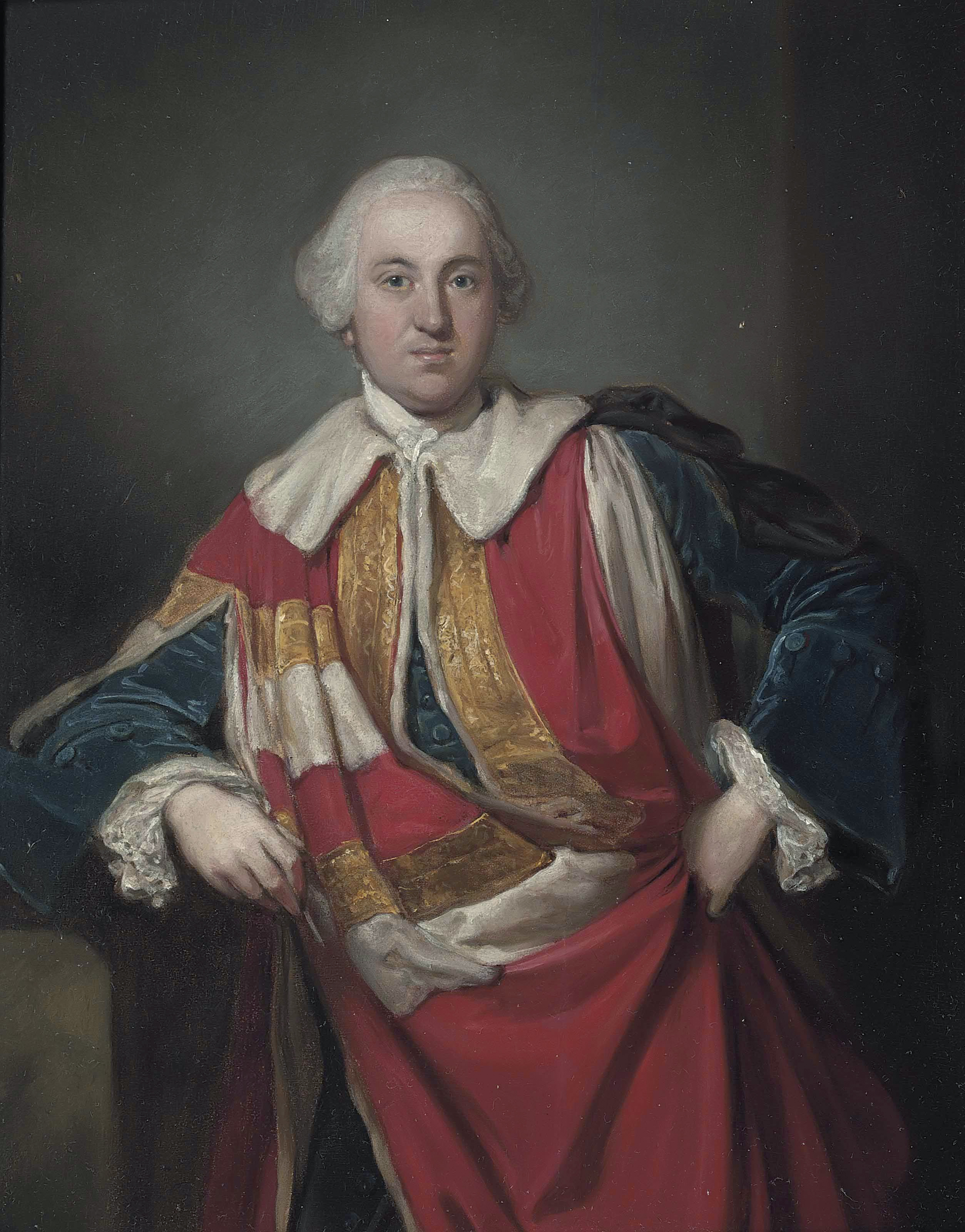
- Richard, 2nd Baron Edgcumbe, by Joshua Reynolds

Lord Lieutenant of Cornwall
- In office 1759-1761

Comptroller of the Household
- In office 1756-1761

Member of Parliament for Penryn
- In office 1754-1758

Member of Parliament for Lostwithiel
- In office 1747-1754

Member of Parliament for Plympton Erle
- In office 1742-1747

Personal details
- Born: 2 August 1716
- Died: 10 May 1761 (aged 44)
- Parent: Richard Edgcumbe (father)
- Relatives: George Edgcumbe (brother); Richard Edgcumbe (nephew)

Richard Edgcumbe, 2nd Baron Edgcumbe PC (2 August 1716 – 10 May 1761) was a British nobleman and politician.

== Biography ==
The eldest surviving son of Richard Edgcumbe, 1st Baron Edgcumbe and his wife Matilda Furnese, he was educated at Eton from 1725 to 1732. Through his father's interest in Devon and Cornwall, he was returned as Member of Parliament for Plympton Erle at a by-election in 1742 as a Government supporter.

He was given a secret service pension of £500 a year by Henry Pelham to provide for him. Meanwhile, he was made a capital burgess of Lostwithiel in 1743 and served as mayor the next year. He switched his seat to Lostwithiel in 1747. Dissatisfied with subsisting on Government charity, he unsuccessfully made an application to Pelham for employment, rather than a pension, in 1752. He was eventually made a member of the Board of Trade in 1754, when he was returned for Penryn and the next year, a Lord of the Admiralty instead, serving for a year. In 1756, he was appointed Comptroller of the Household and was again mayor of Lostwithiel, being appointed to the Privy Council on 19 November. Succeeding his father in 1758, he was appointed Lord Lieutenant of Cornwall in 1759 and recorder of Plympton Erle.

Edgcumbe was a heavy gambler, losing "daily twenty guineas" at White's. 'Dick' Edgcumbe, as he was usually known, was a close friend of Horace Walpole, George Selwyn, and Gilly Williams. In 1746 Colonel Charles Russell wrote of Edgcumbe and his friends: 'I never sup with them because they keep bad hours'.

Edgcumbe was Reis Effendi (Secretary) of the all-male Turkish Club, better known as the Divan Club. Formed in January,1744, and surviving for only twenty-eight months, this association was a dining club comprising ten gentlemen who had made a voyage to Turkey. Other members of the Club included John Montagu, 4th Earl of Sandwich (Edgcumbe's exact contemporary at Eton College) and Francis Dashwood, 11th Baron le Despencer. He was also a member of the Society of Dilettanti.

He had three or four natural children with his mistress of 9 years known by the nickname 'the Kitten'. The identity of the mother (who died in June 1745), and of the children, is not known.

Anne Franks Day, by Sir Joshua Reynolds (Carnegie Museum of Art)

He had five children by his mistress Anne Franks Day (later Lady Fenoulhet) all of whom he acknowledged at their baptism as his natural children:

- Henrietta Edgcumbe De Lavalette (née Edgcumbe) (1752-1827), married Charles De Prades De Lavalette of Castelsarrasin (1738-?)
- Richard Franks Day Edgcumbe (1754-1779), surveyor, married Peggy Bosgrove of Somerset (1753-1845)
- Anne de Fitte de Carros (née Edgcumbe) (1755-?), married Captain Arnaud Marie Geneviève Casimir de Fitte de Garies of Clermont-Ferrand (1745-1806)
- Lydia Vigoreux de La Ville Bague (née Edgcumbe) (1757-1814) married Francois Henry Vigoreux de La Ville Bague of Ile Maurice domaine de La Villebague (1756-1800)
- William Edgcumbe (1760-1760?)

Richard Edgcumbe's daughter Henrietta by Joshua Reynolds (Museum of Fine Arts, Boston)

Jean-Henri Müntz dedicated his volume 'Encaustic, or, Count Caylus's method of painting in the manner of the ancients : to which is added a sure and easy method for fixing of crayons' of 1760 to Richard Edgcumbe.

He suffered from dropsy and died in 1761. He was succeeded by his brother.

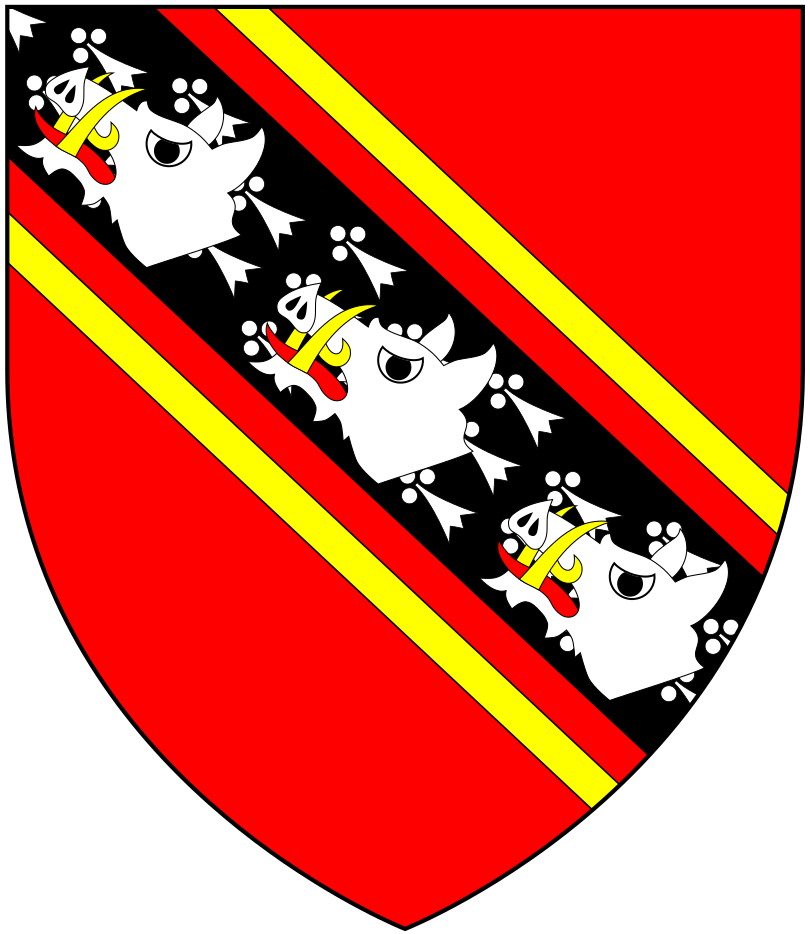
Arms of Edgcumbe, Earls of Mount Edgcumbe: Gules, on a bend ermines cotised or three boar's heads couped argent

Parliament of Great Britain
Preceded by Thomas Clutterbuck; The Lord Sundon	Member of Parliament for Plympton Erle; 1742–1747; With: The Lord Sundon 1742–1747; George Edgcumbe 1747	Succeeded by George Treby; William Baker
Preceded by Sir John Crosse; Sir Robert Cotton	Member of Parliament for Lostwithiel; 1747–1754; With: James Edward Colleton	Succeeded by James Edward Colleton; Thomas Clarke
Preceded by George Boscawen; Henry Seymour Conway	Member of Parliament for Penryn; 1754–1758; With: George Boscawen	Succeeded by George Boscawen; John Plumptre
Political offices
Preceded by Lord Hobart	Comptroller of the Household; 1756–1761	Succeeded by The Earl of Powis
Honorary titles
Preceded by The 1st Lord Edgcumbe	Lord Lieutenant of Cornwall; 1759–1761	Succeeded by The 3rd Lord Edgcumbe
Peerage of Great Britain
Preceded by Richard Edgcumbe	Baron Edgcumbe; 1758–1761	Succeeded by George Edgcumbe
