= Plumptre House, Nottingham =

Plumptre House
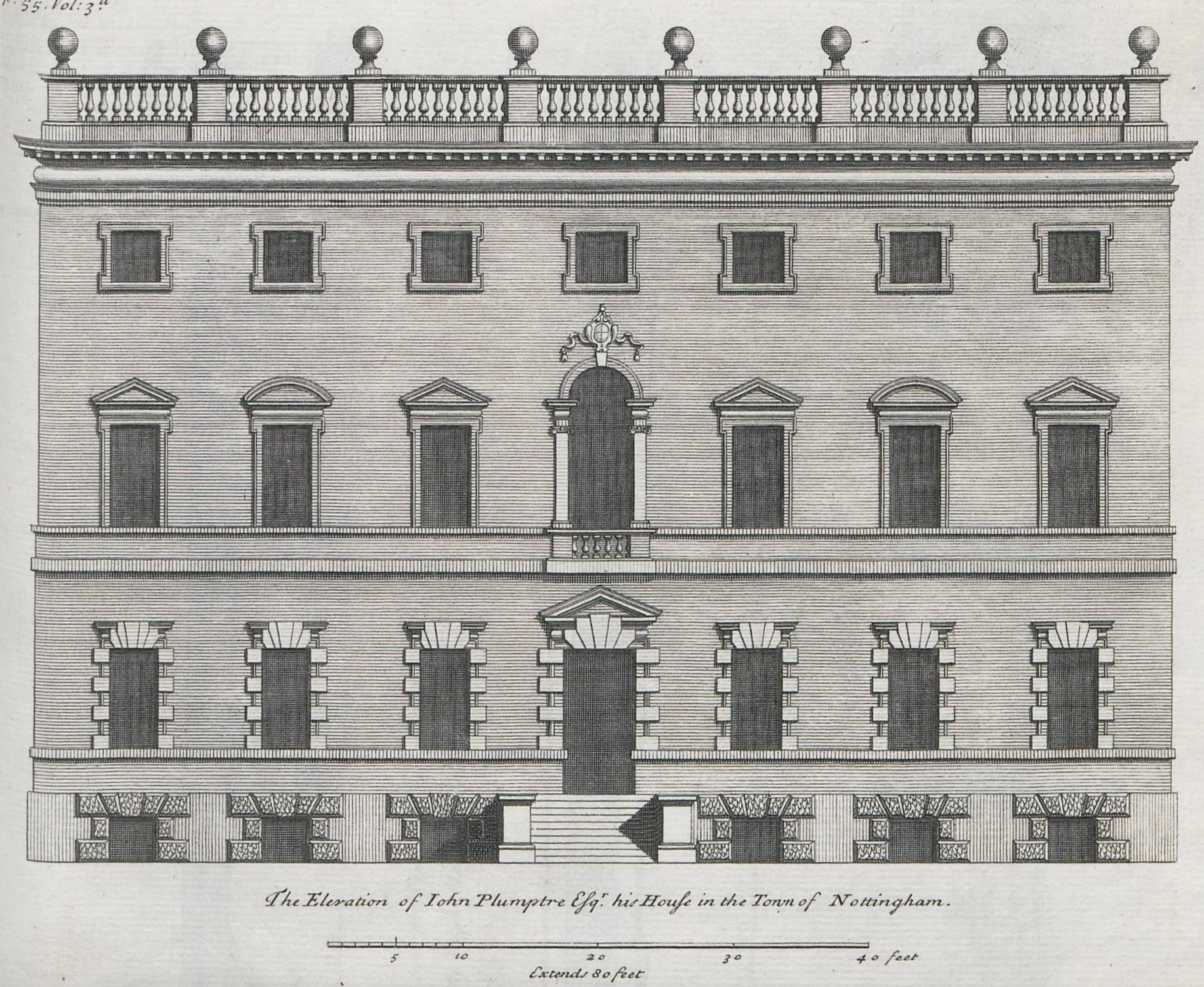
- Plumptre House pictured in Vitruvius Britannicus

- Location within Nottingham

General information
- Location: Nottingham, England
- Coordinates: 52°57′6.4″N 1°08′34.3″W
- Construction started: 1724
- Completed: 1730
- Demolished: 1860

Design and construction
- Architect: Colen Campbell

Plumptre House, Nottingham (also known as Plumtre House) was the home of the Plumptre family from the thirteenth century until 1791.

The house was located on the corner of what is now Keyes Walk and Stoney Street in Nottingham, adjacent to the churchyard of St Mary's Church. The family had occupied the site since at least the thirteenth century. John Plumptre (b. 1679) inherited the house from his father Henry in 1693. The house was remodelled between 1724 and 1730 to the designs of Colen Campbell.

The last of the Plumptre family to live in the house was John Plumptre (1711-1791), MP for Nottingham. Following Plumptre's death in 1791, the house was lived in by William Wilson, an Alderman of Nottingham.

It was sold in 1841 by C.N. Wright.

From mid 1840's until 1853 the house was occupied by Mrs Anna Eliza Treffrey, a widow with three daughters who ran a girls' school there. 'Women can do anything under God' was Mrs Treffrey's catchphrase. Among the pupils was Margaret Morrow who became an educational powerhouse, reformer and philanthropist in Belfast, known latterly as Margaret Byers LL D.

The property was purchased on 21 February 1853 for £8,410 (equivalent to £923,900 in 2025) by Richard Birkin. The house was let for six years to the Nottingham School of Design. It subsequently moved to Commerce Square, where it became the Nottingham School of Art.

The building was demolished in 1860 as the site was cleared for the construction of a lace warehouse.
