= Anne, Lady Fenoulhet =

English beauty and society hostess (c1725-1790)

Anne, Lady Fenoulhet (née Franks Day)
- Anne, Lady Fenoulhet by Sir Joshua Reynolds, Carnegie Museum of Art
- Born: Anne Franks Day; Circa 1725; Near Plymouth, Devon England
- Died: August 1790; Abbaye Royale de St Anstroberte, Montreuil-sur-Mer
- Occupations: Socialite and Celebrity
- Spouse: Sir Peter Fenoulhet (1706-1774)
- Partner: Richard Edgcumbe (1716-1761)

Anne, Lady Fenoulhet (c.1725 in Plymouth - 1790 Montreuil-sur-Mer), née Anne (sometimes 'Nancy') Franks Day was an 18th Century socialite, alleged courtesan, mistress to Richard Edgcumbe, 2nd Baron Edgcumbe, and the subject of one of Sir Joshua Reynolds' best known portraits.

== Early life ==
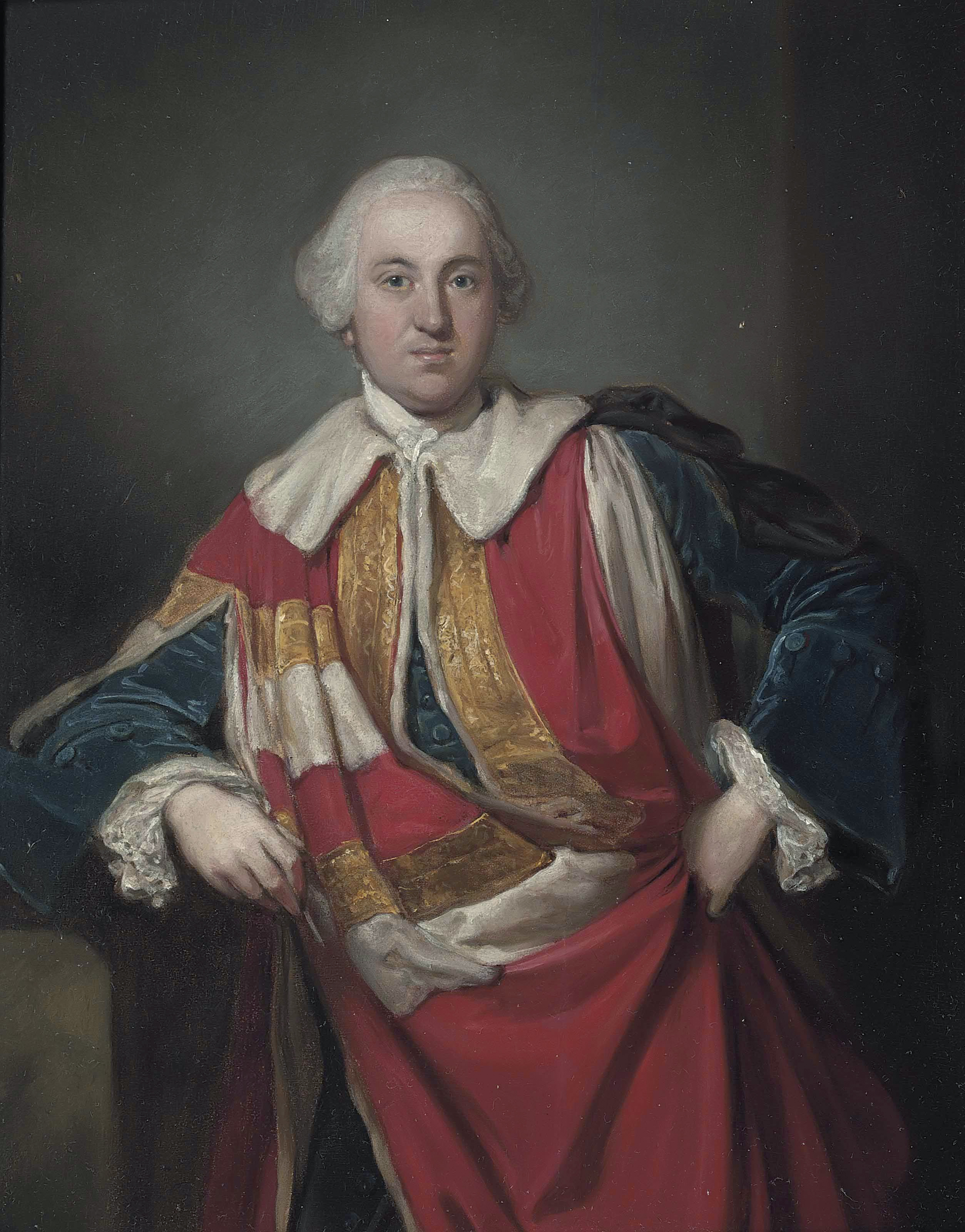
Richard Edgcumbe, by Sir Joshua Reynolds (Christie's)

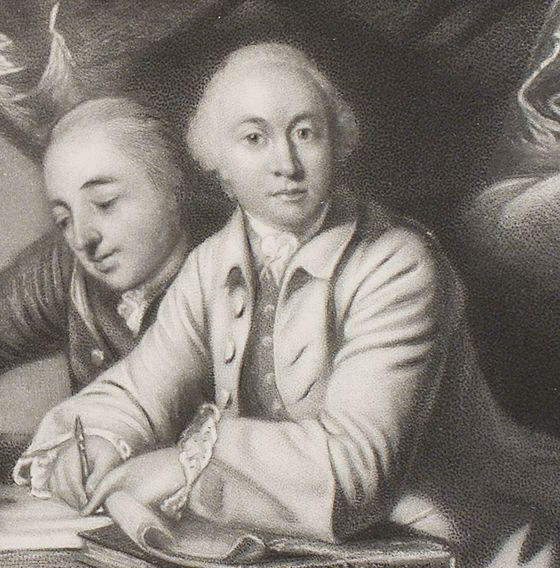
Richard Edgcumbe detail from a mezzotint by James Scott after Sir Joshua Reynolds (National Portrait Gallery, London)

Details of Anne Fenoulhet's early life are scarce; the main source is a scurrilous article published in the “Histories of the Tête-à-Tête” in the Town and Country Magazine, or Universal Repository of Knowledge, Instruction, and Entertainment in November 1770 in which she is called 'Nancy':

Nancy was born in Devonshire, near Plymouth, of parents, whose honesty did them more honour than their pedigree. As she had no prospects beyond the rank of servitude, she contented herself with the situation which fortune seemed to have allotted her. But in this she was mistaken: [Lord Edgcumbe] had frequently noticed her, in riding by her father's hovel, and felt as frequently a strong penchant for her. When she was about eighteen, he found means to have a conference with her, in which her pride and ambition were so elated, that she eloped from her father, and took up her abode at Mount Edgcumbe. His lordship behaved in a generous manner to her, as well as to her relations, placing her father in a very considerable farm, and providing for her brothers in the navy.

This account may fit an Anne Day who was baptised September 7, 1725 in Ashprington, Devon, daughter of John and Ann Day and sister to Elizabeth, John, Joan and William.

Richard ('Dick') Edgcumbe's position compelled him to take a seat in Parliament but he had little interest in politics. He was instead a rake, a wit, a patron of the arts, and above all a gambler. ‘Edgcumbe who thinks nothing important that is not to be decided by dice’, his friend Horace Walpole wrote to Richard Bentley, and ‘What parts, genius, and agreeableness, thrown away at a hazard table’ Walpole penned of him to George Montagu. Edgcumbe had a mistress known as 'the Kitten' prior to Anne Day, he wrote of her to Walpole in the following terms '...by this time you begin to laugh at me; and well you may, for who would have thought that I, [who] never cared for any past sixteen, and who shuddered at the thought of a wrinkled belly, should be mad for love of a little whore, after eight years acquaintance, and three or four children?' 'The Kitten' died in June 1745 and her name is apparently unrecorded.

Henrietta De Lavalette as a child by Joshua Reynolds, Museum of Fine Arts, Boston

Anne Day was Richard Edgcumbe's mistress (in 18th Century parlance 'in high keeping') by October 1746 when Walpole was asked by a mutual friend if he had written verses for 'Nanny' Day ('Nanny' was her nickname). Baptismal records show Anne and Richard had five children together, all of whom he acknowledged at their baptism as his natural children:

- Henrietta Edgcumbe De Lavalette (née Edgcumbe) (1752-1827), married Charles De Prades De Lavalette of Castelsarrasin (1738-?)
- Richard Franks Day Edgcombe (1754-1779), surveyor, married Peggy Bosgrove of Somerset (1753-1845)
- Anne de Fitte de Carros (née Edgcumbe) (1755-?), married Captain Arnaud Marie Geneviève Casimir de Fitte de Garies of Clermont-Ferrand (1745-1806)
- Lydia Vigoreux de La Ville Bague (née Edgcumbe) (1757-1814) married Francois Henry Vigoreux de La Ville Bague of Ile Maurice, Domaine de La Villebague (1756-1800)
- William Edgcumbe (1760-1760?)

In 1752, Anne Day's relationship with Edgcumbe was the subject of a published satire 'an Epistle from the Hon R._ E._ to his dear Nanny'.

The Edgcumbe family were major patrons of Sir Joshua Reynolds and he produced portraits of many family members in the 1750s and 1760s. These included portraits of Anne and her daughter Henrietta. Joshua Reynolds's appointment books show that Anne and her daughter sat for him between January 1759 and January 1760 in the family home in Dover Street, Mayfair.

In 1758, Richard Edgcumbe succeeded his father as Baron Edgcumbe. He died on 10 May 1761. In his will he made substantial financial provision for Anne and her four surviving children and appointed Horace Walpole as her trustee.

Anne's relationship with the Edgcumbe family appears to have remained good for she appointed Richard Edgcumbe, the Second Earl Mount Edgcumbe, and her lover's nephew, as her executor.

== Marriage to Sir Peter Fenoulhet ==
The Town and Country Magazine takes up the story:

Miss Day now repaired to the metropolis, where she constantly refined: she had presently many suitors, and among the rest Peter [Fenoulhet] Esq; then an [Ensign] of the Yeomen of the Guard. She was advised by many of her friends to accept his hand, as it would place her upon a respectable footing, and at length, with reluctance, she yielded to their intreaties.

When Anne and Sir Peter Fenoulhet met, he was a 56-year-old widower from Exeter, and a Huguenot, and she was a single mother in her late 30s. They married in St George's, Hanover Square on 22 July 1762 and she declared that she was a 'spinster of this parish [St George's] and upwards of twenty-one years old'. The marriage did not last. The Town and Country Magazine says that the couple split because Sir Peter 'made a discovery' about his bride. Anne's will says that she walked out on him. Either way, she relocated to Calais, France, with at least two of her daughters where the Town and Country Magazine says 'she [passed] her time very agreeably, and much to her satisfaction, among the French and Irish officers' (which is likely a slur).

== Exile and Death in France ==
Anne spent her final years in the Abbaye Royale de St Anstroberte in Montreuil-sur-Mer. Her will shows that she lived in some comfort. The inventory of her personal possessions runs to several pages and includes diamond earrings, rings, hairpins, a cross and a miniature of a nobleman surrounded by diamonds. It also includes her portrait 'in a white bonnet' painted by Joshua Reynolds (now in Pittsburgh in the Carnegie Museum of Art).

== Anne Fenoulhet in the fine and decorative arts ==
The Town and Country article on Lady Fenoulhet from 1770 opens by saying:

Nancy Day, whose face may be seen under a bonnet at every print-shop in town, inscribed with the title of lady [Fenoulhet], was then in her prime; she was tall, genteel, and elegant in her person, vivacious and communicative.

In his unpublished dissertation 'Blind Items: Anonymity, Notoriety, and the Making of Eighteenth-Century Celebrity', Kevin Bourque writes (at page 95):

The face of Nancy Day, woman-of-pleasure and mistress of Lord Mount Edgcumbe, was papered across shop windows and covetously placed in watches soon after being painted by Reynolds. Then, after she landed the title of Lady Fenoulhet, she was reissued and replastered...

This is certainly true. Anne Fenoulhet was a celebrity in 1760s London and her portrait was reproduced in engravings and on snuff boxes, etuis and mirrors. She was a Georgian pin-up girl - with every image taken from Joshua Reynolds's original.

== Portraits of Lady Fenoulhet ==
Anne Day, after Joshua Reynolds, mezzotint published by John Bowles, circa 1760 (National Portrait Gallery, London, NPG D1942)

Portrait of Lady Fenoulhet after Reynolds (Mannings 498), by Richard Purcell (British Museum )

Anne Franks (née Day), Lady Fenoulhet by Richard Purcell after Sir Joshua Reynolds (National Portrait Gallery, London )

Patch Box enameled with Lady Fenoulhet's image after Joshua Reynolds (ex coll Gerald Poynton Mander, Compton, Wolverhampton (1885-1951))

Staffordshire Enamel Etui, circa 1760, with portrait of Lady Fenoulhet after Reynolds

Hidden portrait of Lady Fenoulhet inside a Staffordshire enamel snuff box, circa 1760 (ex coll Nellie Ionides )

'Glass Picture' based on Richard Purcell's portrait of Lady Fenoulhet (From The Connoisseur Volume LXXXVII, edited by C. Reginald Grundy)

Watch-paper with a portrait of Miss Day after Reynolds (Mannings 498) by John June (British Museum )
