= Thomas Clutterbuck =

British politician

Thomas Clutterbuck PC (1697 – 23 November 1742) was a British politician who sat in the British House of Commons from 1722 to 1742 and in the Parliament of Ireland from 1725 to 1742.

Clutterbuck was the eldest son of Thomas Clutterbuck of Ingatestone, Essex and his wife Bridgett Exton, daughter of Sir Thomas Exton, LLD, one of the Six Clerks in Chancery. He matriculated at Christ Church, Oxford on 20 October 1713, aged 16 and was admitted at Middle Temple in 1713. He married Henrietta Cuffe Tollemache, daughter of Lord Huntingtower ion 1 May 1731.

Clutterbuck was returned as Member of Parliament for Liskeard at the 1722 British general election. He was returned again at the 1727 British general election. At the 1734 British general election he was returned again as MP for Plympton Erle He was returned again at the 1741 British general election. From 1724 to 1730 he was Chief Secretary to the Lord Carteret as Lord Lieutenant of Ireland and was also Member of the Parliament of Ireland for Lisburn from 1725 to 1742 He was Lord of the Admiralty from 1732 to 1741, Lord of the Treasury from 1741 to 1742, and Treasurer of the navy from 1742. He was made a Privy Councillor on 24 June 1742.

Clutterbuck died on 23 November 1742 leaving a son and three daughters.

Political offices
Preceded by Edward Hopkins	Chief Secretary for Ireland; 1724–1730	Succeeded by Walter Carey
Preceded by Arthur Onslow	Treasurer of the Navy; 1742	Succeeded by Charles Wager
Parliament of Great Britain
Preceded by Edward Eliot; John Lansdell	Member of Parliament for Liskeard; 1722–1734; With: John Lansdell 1722–27; Sir John Cope 1727–34	Succeeded by Richard Eliot; George Dennis
Preceded by Richard Edgcumbe; John Fuller	Member of Parliament for Plympton Erle; 1734–1742; With: Richard Edgcumbe 1734–1735, 1741–1742; Thomas Walker 1735–1741; The Lord Sundon 1742	Succeeded by The Lord Sundon; Hon. Richard Edgcumbe
Parliament of Ireland
Preceded by Brent Spencer; Edmond Francis Stafford	Member of Parliament for Lisburn; 1725–1742; With: Brent Spencer 1725–36; Nicholas Price 1736–42	Succeeded by Nicholas Price; Edward Smyth
