= The Stone Coyotes =

American musical group

- VIII, the eighth album by The Stone Coyotes

Background information
- Origin: Massachusetts, United States
- Genres: Rock, country rock
- Years active: 1998 - present
- Labels: Red Cat Records
- Members: Barbara Keith and John Tibbles
- Past members: Doug Tibbles
- Website: stonecoyotes.com

The Stone Coyotes are an American band that debuted with their first album in 1998. They hail from Massachusetts but tour primarily in Texas as that is where they receive their most radio airplay.

== Background ==
Barbara Keith founded the family-revolved band in Massachusetts with her family. Doug Tibbles was her husband, and his son John Tibbles is her stepson. Barbara Keith is mainly the guitarist, and also writes most of their songs. Doug started playing drums for the band shortly before the trio was formed, when Keith was signed with Warner Brothers. John learned to play the bass guitar at eleven and started playing in the band when he was eighteen.

Douglas Tibbles died on April 12, 2023, at the age of 83.

== Be Cool ==
Be Cool is a New York Times bestselling crime novel written by Elmore Leonard. The novel, published in 1999, is the sequel to Get Shorty (1990), and was made into a major motion picture in 2005. Barbara Keith was a major influence to this novel, especially its plot. The song "Odessa" was written for the book. Five of her songs are mentioned in the actual text.

== Discography ==
- Church of the Falling Rain (1998) Red Cat Records
- Situation out of Control (2000) Red Cat Records
- Born to Howl (2001) Red Cat Records
- Ride Away from the World (2003) Red Cat Records
- Rise from the Ashes (2003) Red Cat Records
- Fire it Up (2005) Red Cat Records
- Dreams of Glory (2006) Red Cat Records
- VIII (2008) Red Cat Records
- A Rude Awakening (2009) Red Cat Records
- My Turn (2010) Red Cat Records
- I Couldn't Find You (2011) Red Cat Records
- A Wild Bird Flying (2012) Red Cat Records
- Rock Another Day (2014) Red Cat Records
- Sally in the Doorway (2017)
- Hit The Ground Running (2019) EP
- Rough and Tumble (2021) EP
