= Edward Darrell (died 1573) =

16th-century English politician

Edward Darrell (by 1523 – 25 June 1573), of Newtimber, Sussex, was an English politician.

He was a member (MP) of the parliament of England for Plympton Erle in 1547.
