= Thomas Percy (fl. 1563) =

English politician

Thomas Percy (fl. 1563) was an English politician.

Percy was a member of the parliament of England for Plympton Erle in 1563.
