= Zellmann =

Zellmanl is a German surname. Notable people with the surname include:

- Jochen Zellmann (1943–2016), German painter
- Peter Zellmann (born 1947), Austrian educational scientist and director of the Institute for Leisure and Tourism Research (IFT) in Vienna
- Poul Zellmann, German swimmer
- Richard Zellmann, United States Army major general

== See also ==
- Zelman
