= Kathleen Zelman =

American nutritionist, dietitian and communications expert

Kathleen Manning Zelman, MPH, RD, LD, is an American nutritionist, dietitian, and communications expert who served as WebMD's director of nutrition for 17 years and is currently the owner of No Nonsense Nutrition, LLC.

== Biography ==
Zelman received her B.S. in Foods and Nutrition in 1975 from Montclair State University. After completing her dietetic internship at Perth Amboy General Hospital in Perth Amboy, NJ, she then worked as a pediatric dietitian at New London General Hospital in New London, CT (1976), and Rhode Island Hospital (1977 – 1980) in Providence, RI. She obtained a master's degree, in Public Health (1982) at Tulane University School of Public Health and Tropical Medicine in New Orleans, LA. From 1980-1984, she served as assistant professor of foods and nutrition at St. Mary's Dominican College in New Orleans, LA. In 1985, she worked as dietetic internship director at Alton Ochsner Medical Foundation, also in New Orleans, LA, until 1993. She started her career at WebMD in 2003.

Zelman was a spokesperson for the Louisiana, Georgia, and American Dietetic Associations (now the Academy of Nutrition and Dietetics) for various years from 1985–2003. After moving to Atlanta, GA, in 1993, she has worked as a nutrition consultant to media, food industry, publishers, chefs, restaurants and communication groups. As a member of the Georgia Dietetic Association, she has been both a delegate to the American Dietetic Association and trustee for the Georgia Dietetic Foundation from 1999 – 2003. She was on the board of directors of the Academy of Nutrition and Dietetics from 2009 to 2012.

Zelman has been on the professional advisory boards of the Egg Nutrition Center (2006 – date), National Dairy Council (2003 – 2010), General Mills, Inc. (2004 – 2008), Nickelodeon's “Go Healthy!” Advisory Board (2006 – 2010), Neogenis Labs (2010 – 2011), and hunger charity Share Our Strength’s National Advisory Board (2009 – date). Zelman also advised Jamba Juice via the Healthy Living Council from 2013 – 2015. She has also served as a James Beard Foundation Award judge since 2009.

In 2001, Zelman began work in media training and speaks at international meetings for the salmon, almond, egg, dairy, and fish oil industries. In the 2002-2003 academic year, Zelman taught as an adjunct faculty member in the Food and Nutrition department at Georgia State University. Starting in 2003, she began working with WebMD, where she contributes weekly features and columns and develops recipes for WebMD online and WebMD Magazine, and oversaw WebMD's Weight Loss Clinic and serves as nutrition expert for the company. Zelman is also serves as the nutrition expert for United Healthcare, where she writes articles, blogs and conducts monthly webinars since 2009.

In addition to weekly features on WebMD and United Healthcare, Zelman has contributed to Atlanta Journal-Constitution, Times Picayune, Sports Life Magazine, Nutrition Today, Nutrients, and eatright.org and Food & Nutrition Magazine (both of the Academy of Nutrition and Dietetics), along with numerous other nutrition industry publications. She has made print and television appearances including CNN, Good Morning America, NBC Nightly News, Wall St. Journal and New York Times.

== Awards ==
- Academy of Nutrition and Dietetics Media Excellence Award (2007)
- American Society for Nutrition Nutrition Science Media Award (2011)
- Montclair State University College of Education and Human Services Distinguished Alumni Award (2014)
- Academy of Nutrition and Dietetics Lenna Frances Cooper Memorial Award (2016 recipient)
