= 79th Regiment of Foot (1745) =

- Active: 1745–1746
- Country: Kingdom of Great Britain
- Branch: British Army
- Type: Infantry
- Garrison/HQ: Cornwall
- Engagements: Jacobite rising of 1745

Commanders
- Colonel of the Regiment: Richard Edgcumbe, 1st Baron Edgcumbe

The 79th Regiment of Foot, or Edgcumbe's Regiment, was a regiment in the British Army from 1745 to 1746.

== History ==
In response to the Jacobite rising of 1745, the regiment was raised in Cornwall by Richard Edgcumbe, 1st Baron Edgcumbe. The new regiment received the rank 79th.

The 79th Foot was declared "half-complete" on 3 December. As of 1 February 1746, it mustered 649 NCOs and privates for an authorized strength of 780.

It never left Cornwall, except a short duty of garrison in Plymouth.

The regiment was ordered to be disbanded on 10 June 1745 and the process was probably completed by the end of the month.

== Uniform ==
The actual uniform of the Regiment is unknown, but most of the regiment raised by noblemen in 1745 had blue coats with red facings.
