= Thomas Gregory (MP) =

16th-century English politician

Thomas Gregory (1502–1536/40) was an English politician.

Gregory was a Member of the Parliament of England for Plympton Erle in 1529.
