= Honeychurch (surname) =

Honeychurch is a surname. Notable people with the surname include:

- Cara Honeychurch, Australian ten-pin bowling player
- Klint Honeychurch, American video game designer
- Lucy Honeychurch, fictional character in E. M. Forster's 1908 novel A Room with a View
- Marlyse Honeychurch, victim of the Bear Brook murders
- Mitch Honeychurch (born 1995), Australian rules footballer

== See also ==
- Honychurch
