= William Selman I =

Member of the Parliament of England

William Selman was an English politician who was MP for Plympton Erle in January 1397. History of Parliament Online suggests that he was a brother of John Selman.
