= John Martin (died c. 1592) =

English politician

John Martin alias Honychurch (1525?–1592?) was an English politician.

Martin was an MP for Plympton Erle (UK Parliament constituency) in April 1554.
