= Henry Hulsbergh =

Dutch engraver

Henry or Hendrick Hulsbergh or Hulsberg (died 1729) was a Dutch engraver of maps and architecture who worked in London from at least 1709 onwards.

== Life ==
Born in Amsterdam, Hulsbergh was in London by 1709. He was mainly employed engraving large architectural compositions such as Colen Campbell's Vitruvius Britannicus, Kip's Britannia Illustrata, and Christopher Wren's Designs for St. Paul's Cathedral. He also engraved portraits, including one of Georg Andreas Ruperti, pastor of the Dutch Church in London in 1709. Hulsberg was warden of the Lutheran Church in the Savoy Hospital, and was supported by the congregation and the brethren of a Dutch club during two years of continued illness and disability. He died in May 1729 of a paralytic fit, and was buried in the Savoy.

== Locations ==
- Bramham Park

== Engravings ==
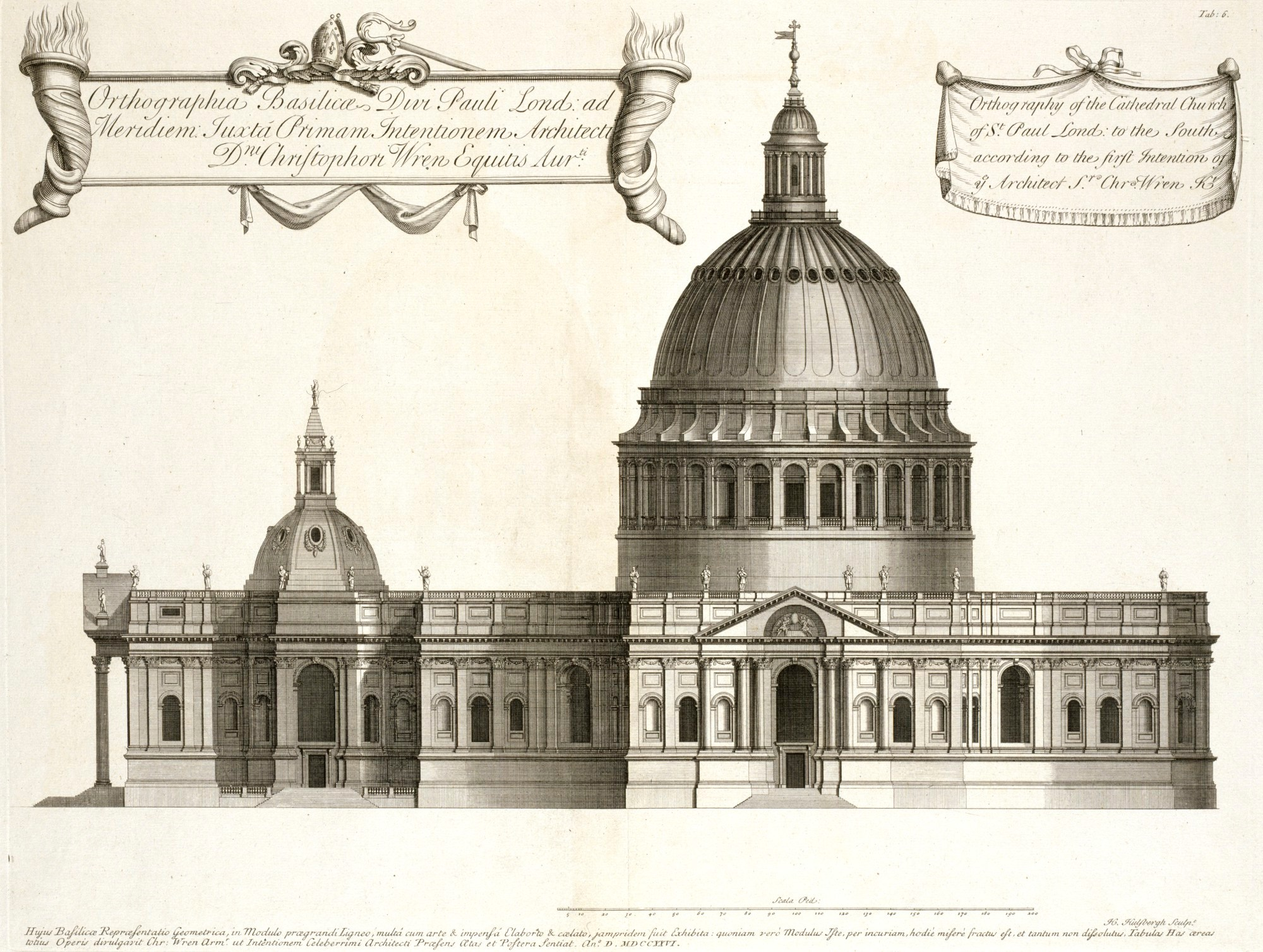
South elevation of the Great Model of St. Paul's Cathedral

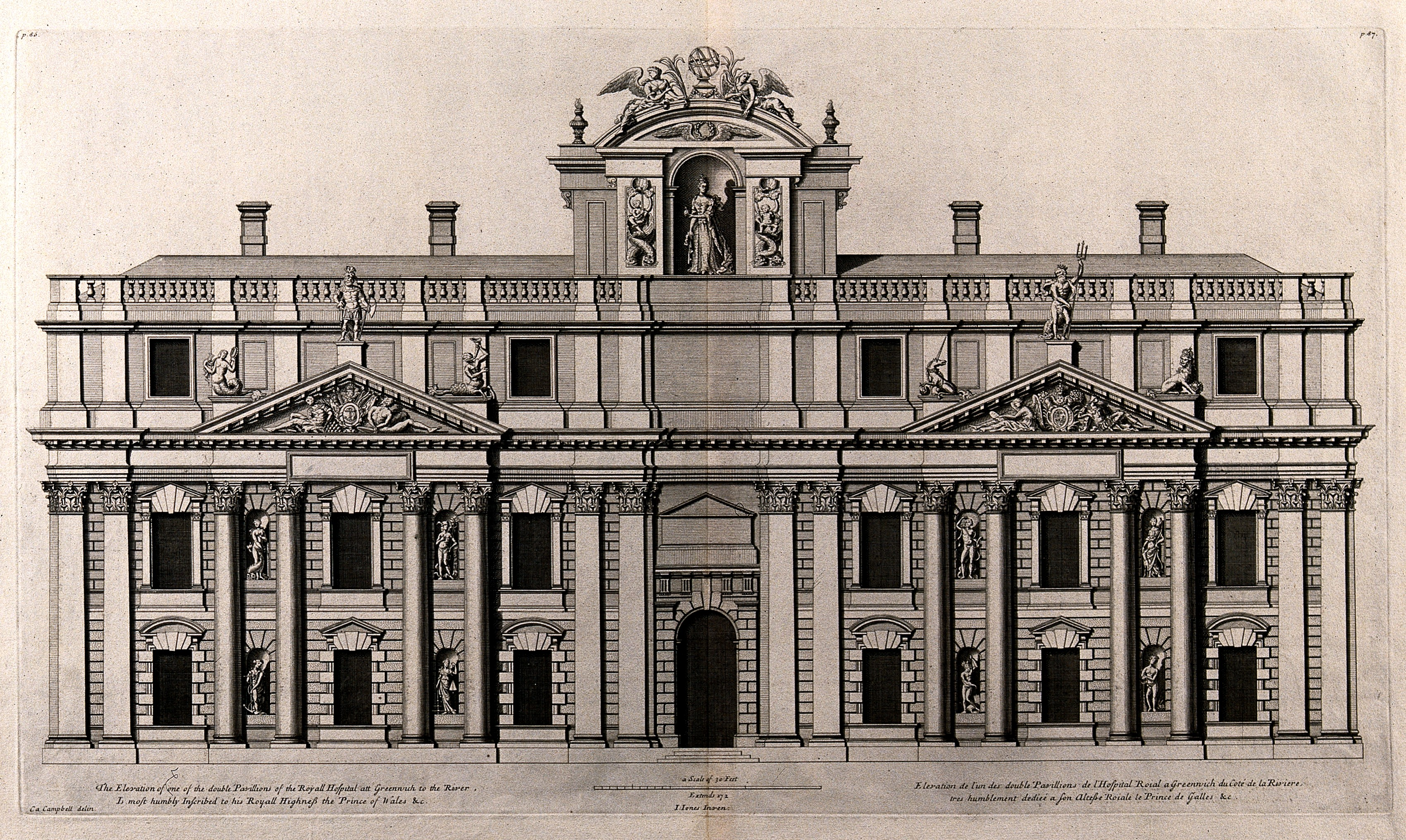
Facade of the Royal Naval Hospital, Greenwich
