= Ceili =

Ceili was an Irish priest in the mid-eleventh century. He was Bishop of Ardagh and died in 1048.
