= John Martin (died 1545) =

English politician

John Martin alias Honychurch (by 1502 – 16 November 1545) was an English politician.

He was a Member of Parliament for Plympton Erle in 1529.
