= Honeychurch (band) =

Band in Bucks County, Pennsylvania

Honeychurch was an American band from Bucks County, Pennsylvania, United States. Music journals such as The Big Takeover and No Depression have described Honeychurch's music as a mix of indie rock, alternative country, and slowcore, with strong influences from 1960s and 1970s psychedelic and folk rock . Honeychurch released three studio albums: Calling Me Home (2001), Makes Me Feel Better (2004), and Will You Be There With Me (2012). There was also a single released called September Songs (2015) with tracks: "Side of a Mountain" & "Constellations". Source: Honeychurch.bandcamp.com

== Background ==
The band was originally the solo project of Virginia-born Shilough Hopwood (singer, multi-instrumentalist, and songwriter). Shilough is the son of Teddy Speleos of the 1960's band Holy Moses. (Source: Facebook)

Shilough wrote most of the tracks on the band's 2004 release, Makes Me Feel Better. Larissa Hopwood joined in 1999. She played bass and sang both lead and harmony vocals. Lead guitarist Tim Kratz joined Honeychurch in 2001, and with his presence, the live band took shape. Kratz's playing combined slide guitar and B-Bender techniques and is often mistaken for pedal steel. Drummer Greg Millward joined Honeychurch in 2004, replacing Stefan Baker. A native of Doncaster, England, Millward started playing drums in the brass bands which are traditional in Northern England, and also played in Thumper and other groups in England before joining Honeychurch in 2004. Since 2008, Alex Yaker (frontman for the band Roomtone) played piano with Honeychurch both at live shows and in the studio, and Ivan Funk joined the band on pedal steel in 2012. Shilough died in September 2023.

Honeychurch's albums were released with the help of independent record store Siren Records in Doylestown, Pennsylvania. The band was named one of Philadelphia Weekly's Top 5 of the Moment in March 2001 and they've continued to garner significant attention in the Philadelphia area. In 2012, Big Takeover editor Jack Rabid named "Will You Be There With Me" the number 5 best record of the year.

== Discography ==
=== Studio albums ===
- Calling Me Home (2001)
- Makes Me Feel Better (2004)
- Will You Be There With Me (2012)

=== Compilation albums ===
- Early Times, 2001 - 2004 (2008)
