= John Selman (fl. 1414–1435) =

English politician

John Selman (fl. 1414–1435) of Plympton Erle and Portworthy, Devon, was an English politician.

== Family ==
Selman was the (probably illegitimate) son of another Plympton Erle MP, John Selman I.

== Career ==
He was a Member (MP) of the Parliament of England for Plympton Erle in November 1414, 1420, May 1421, December 1421, 1425, 1427, 1431, 1432, 1433 and 1435.
