= Selman Uranues =

Austrian surgeon

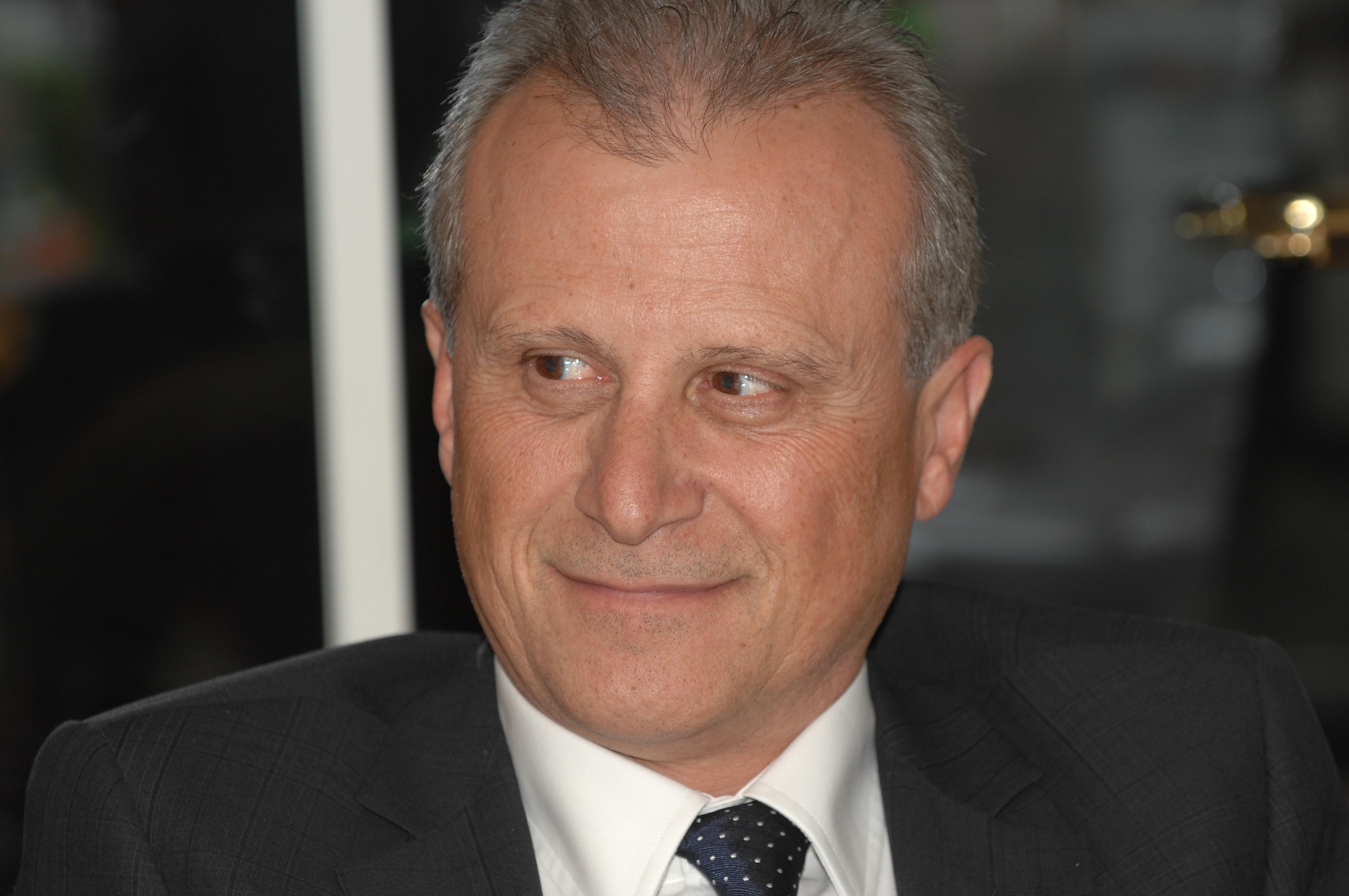
- Selman Uranues
- Known for: Minimally invasive surgery, spleen-, gastrointestinal-, acute surgery, visceral traumatology
- Scientific career
- Fields: Surgery
- Workplaces: Medical University of Graz

Selman Uranues is an Austrian physician and professor of surgery at the Medical University of Graz. He is known for his work in the fields of minimally invasive surgery, spleen-, gastrointestinal- and acute surgery and visceral traumatology.

== Biography ==
Selman Uranues received his degree in 1981 from the Medical University of Graz and board certification in surgery in 1988. Upon acceptance of his postgraduate thesis he advanced to the rank of lecturer in general surgery at the same institution in 1990, and then to professor of surgery in 1996. In that same year, he was named director of the Section for Surgical Research. and the University of the Witwatersrand, Chris Hani Baragwanath Hospital, Johannesburg, South Africa.

== Career ==
Uranues’s career combines academic work and clinical surgical practice, with research in minimally invasive, laparoscopic, and needleoscopic surgery. His work has examined reduced-port surgical techniques and the use of virtual reality and robotics in surgical procedures. He has held visiting professorships at institutions including the University of Pennsylvania, Penn State University, the University of Southern California, Charles University in Prague, the University of Newcastle, the University of the Witwatersrand, and Shanghai Jiao Tong University.

He coordinated the 2007 merger of the European Trauma Society and the European Association for Trauma and Emergency Surgery to form the European Society for Trauma and Emergency Surgery (ESTES), serving as its first president from 2008 to 2009. Within the European Association for Endoscopic Surgery, he chaired the Education and Training Committee and the Scientific Program Committee and presided over its 2013 congress in Vienna. He served as president of the International Association for Trauma Surgery and Intensive Care from 2011 to 2013 and of the Austrian Society for Surgical Research from 1993 to 1994. He also serves on the Board of Directors of the World Coalition for Trauma Care.

He is the fellow of American College of Surgeons, which named him an honorary fellow in 2018, and the American Surgical Association, which elected him an international honorary member in 2019. He has also received a Lifetime Achievement Award from the International Association for Trauma Surgery and Intensive Care.

=== Research and scientific contributions ===
Uranues’s research focuses on minimally invasive surgery, abdominal trauma, and acute care surgery. His publications address laparoscopic techniques for abdominal access, pancreatic and splenic surgery, and the diagnosis and treatment of traumatic abdominal injuries.

His research on laparoscopic abdominal access examined open trocar insertion and access-related complications, including in obese patients. He has also co-authored studies on laparoscopic distal pancreatectomy with splenic preservation and the use of laparoscopy to diagnose and treat abdominal trauma in hemodynamically stable patients. This work examined the detection of diaphragmatic and intestinal injuries and the potential to reduce unnecessary laparotomies.

Other studies have assessed outcomes following laparoscopic adhesiolysis and incisional hernia repair, including complications, recurrence, and quality of life. Uranues has also published reviews of laparoscopic splenic surgery and the use of laparoscopy in blunt abdominal trauma. His work on trauma care and surgical education has examined differences in trauma management practices and the organization of acute care surgery in Europe.

In addition to journal articles, Uranues has co-edited medical textbooks on trauma and emergency surgery, including Head, Thoracic, Abdominal and Vascular Injuries and General Trauma Care and Related Aspects, published in Springer’s European Manual of Medicine series. He also co-edited Prophylactic Surgery, which examines preventive surgical procedures and their clinical and ethical considerations.

== Honors and awards ==
- 1990 Science Prize of the Steirische Ärztekammer
- 1991 Science Prize of the Steirische Ärztekammer
- 2008 3rd place of "ebiz e-government award 2008 Steiermark" for the project "Virtual surgery techniques in surgery", Graz
- 2012 Innovation prize of the Familie Klee Stiftung, Frankfurt, Germany
- 2014 Honorary doctorate from the University of Bucharest
- 2014 Visiting Professor Shanghai Jiao Tong University. Affiliated First People's Hospital

== Publications ==
=== Books ===
- with Hans-Jörg Oestern, Otmar Trentz: Head, thoracic, abdominal and vascular injuries. Band 1, Springer, Heidelberg u. a. 2011.
- with Hans-Jörg Oestern, Otmar Trentz: General Trauma Care and Related Aspects. Band 2, Springer, Heidelberg u.a. 2014.
- with Hans-Jörg Oestern, Otmar Trentz: Bone and Joint Injuries. Band 3, Springer, Heidelberg u. a. 2014.
