= John Serle (MP for Plympton Erle) =

Member of the Parliament of England

John Serle (fl. 1414–1449) of Plympton, Devon, was an English Member of Parliament for Plympton Erle in November 1414, 1431, 1432, 1433, 1435, 1437, 1442 and February 1449.
