= William Selman II =

English Member of Parliament (fl. 1420–1429)

William Selman was an English politician who was MP for Plympton Erle in 1420, May 1421, December 1421, 1425 and 1429. His wife Joan Beauchamp may have been the mother of Robert Chalons.
