= John Selman (died 1426) =

English politician

John Selman (died 1426), of Plympton Erle and Newnham, Devon, was an English politician.

== Family ==
He had an illegitimate son who was also MP for Plympton Erle, John Selman.

== Career ==
He was a member (MP) of the parliament of England for Plympton Erle in January 1390, 1391, 1394, 1406 and 1411.
