= Holy Moses (American band) =

American rock band

- Origin: Woodstock, New York, U.S.
- Genres: Country rock
- Years active: 1968–1972
- Label: RCA Victor
- Past members: Billy Batson; Teddy Speleos; David Vittek; Marty David; Chris Parker

Holy Moses was an American rock band based in Woodstock, New York. They released one album on RCA Victor Records in 1971.

== Background ==
Speleos (born Theodore Andrew Speleos, 1951) was a virtuoso guitarist who had previously replaced a young Roy Buchanan, in rock and roll band the British Walkers in Washington, D.C.. The band developed an enthusiastic live following. He was there for the release of one of their many singles in 1968.

Speleos & John Hall formed a new band, Kangaroo, with folk singer Barbara Keith and drummer N.D. Smart previously of The Remains. Discovered in NYC the group released several singles and a self-titled album on MGM Records. Teddy’s style on electric guitar was often compared with Jimi Hendrix. In his autobiography Born To Run, Bruce Springsteen wrote that he and Steve Van Zant used to see Speleos playing at the Cafe Wha? in Greenwich Village, and would "sit there slack-jawed at his sound, technique and nonchalance... ".

The band split up in early 1969.John Hall moved on to form the band Orleans and later served as a U.S. State Senator; Smart later formed Mountain with Leslie West; and Keith began a solo career. Speleos moved to Woodstock, New York where a new band, Holy Moses came together.

== Formation and career ==
Holy Moses at first was David Vittik (rhythm guitar, vocals), Marty David (bass, sax) and Teddy Speleos (lead guitar, backup vocals). Chris Parker was recruited (drums). They lived in Woodstock, New York when they converged with singer, songwriter and pianist Billy Batson. Batson was a California native who had recorded for Decca Records in 1966, performed in clubs in California and Greenwich Village, and had several of his songs recorded by duo Hedge and Donna. Batson's songs gave a new focus to the band, and they performed regularly in the Catskills. They rejected a management offer by Albert Grossman, but were seen by Michael Jeffery, who was looking for a new band to manage after the death of his client, Jimi Hendrix. Jeffery was impressed by Speleos' guitar style, and gave him one of Hendrix's guitars. The band won a contract with RCA Victor, and in 1970 recorded their album, Holy Moses!!, at the Electric Lady Studios in New York City. All the songs were written by Batson, and the album was produced by Mike Esposito of the Blues Magoos and Kim King of Lothar and the Hand People.

Released in 1971, Holy Moses!! is said to have "all the ingredients of a bonafide classic.," But the band split up instead of touring. Esposito later described the band as "unusually unstable". Jeffery was killed in an airplane crash in 1973; Speleos' guitars were stolen; and he moved back to Virginia to focus on his young family.

== Later activities ==
Parker joined Paul Butterfield's Better Days; Speleos reportedly later spent some time in a monastery; Marty David became a session musician. Batson was later a member of The Hypstrz, with Ernest Batson, Randy Weiss, and John Haga. They released an album, Hypstrization!, on Voxx Records in 1980.

David Vittek died in 2012. Billy Batson died on September 5, 2017. Teddy Speleos died May 6, 2026.
