= Newnham (Old) =

Historic estate in Devon, England

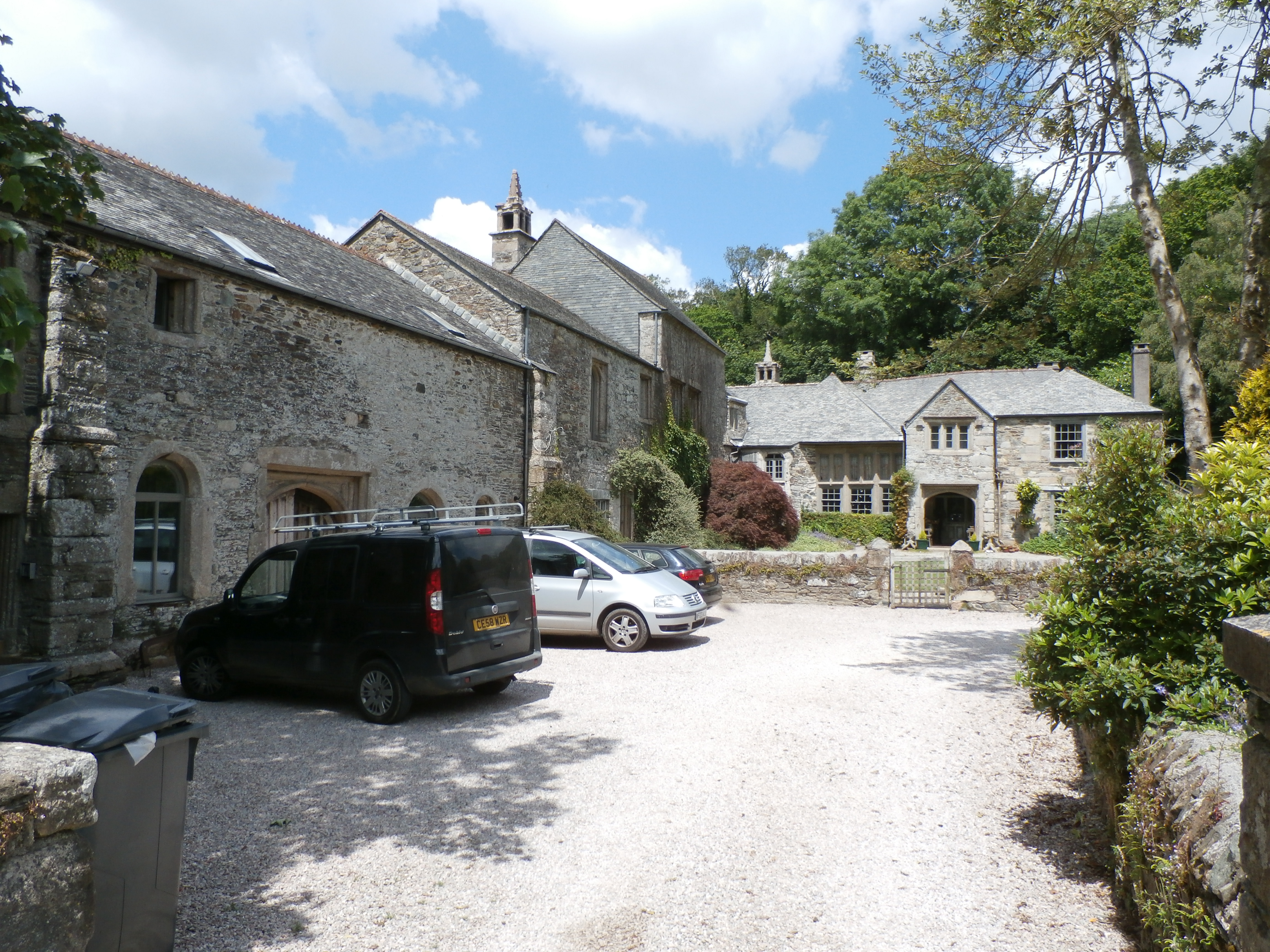
Old Newnham in 2014, looking northward

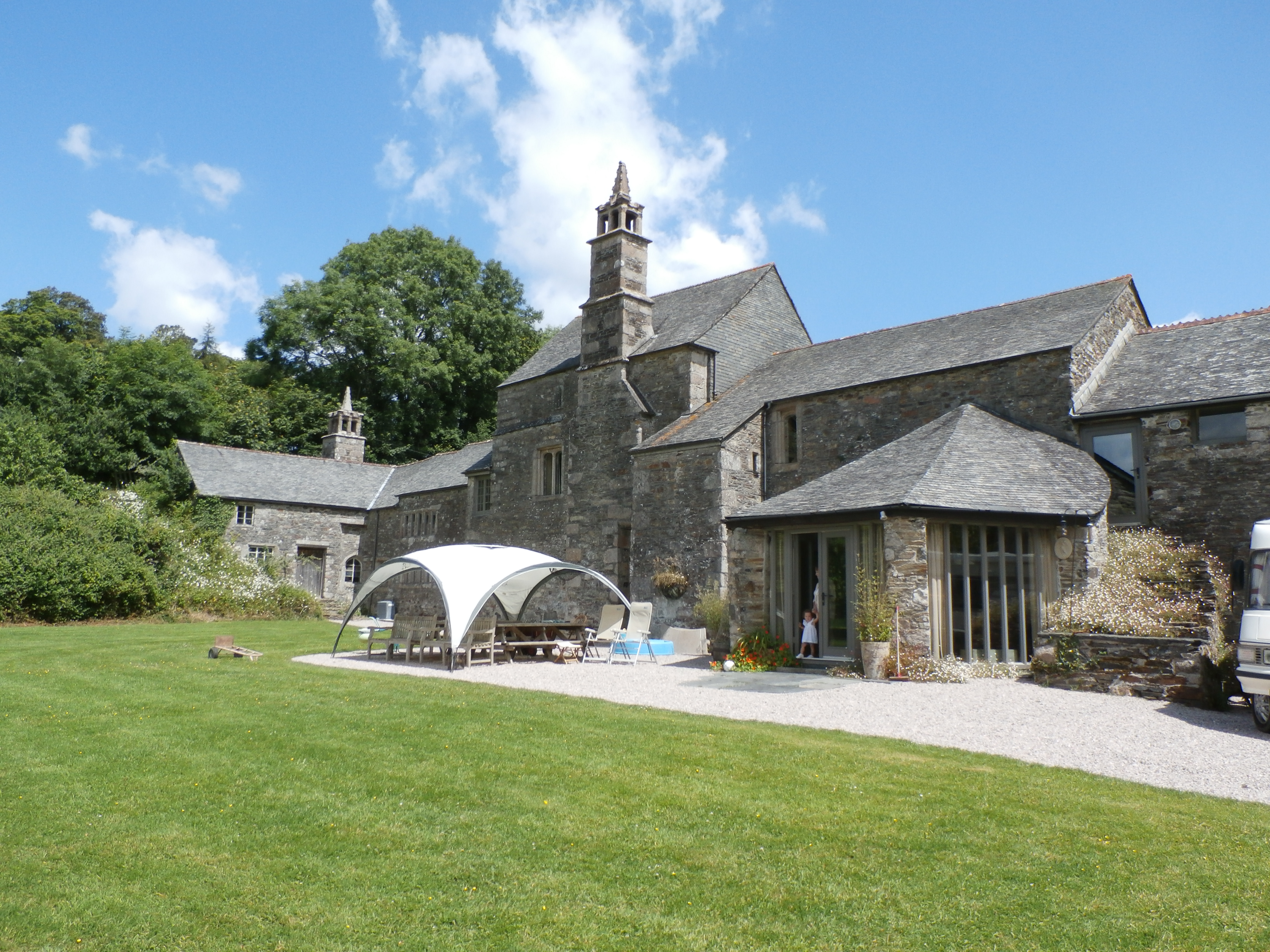
Old Newnham, west wing, looking north-eastward

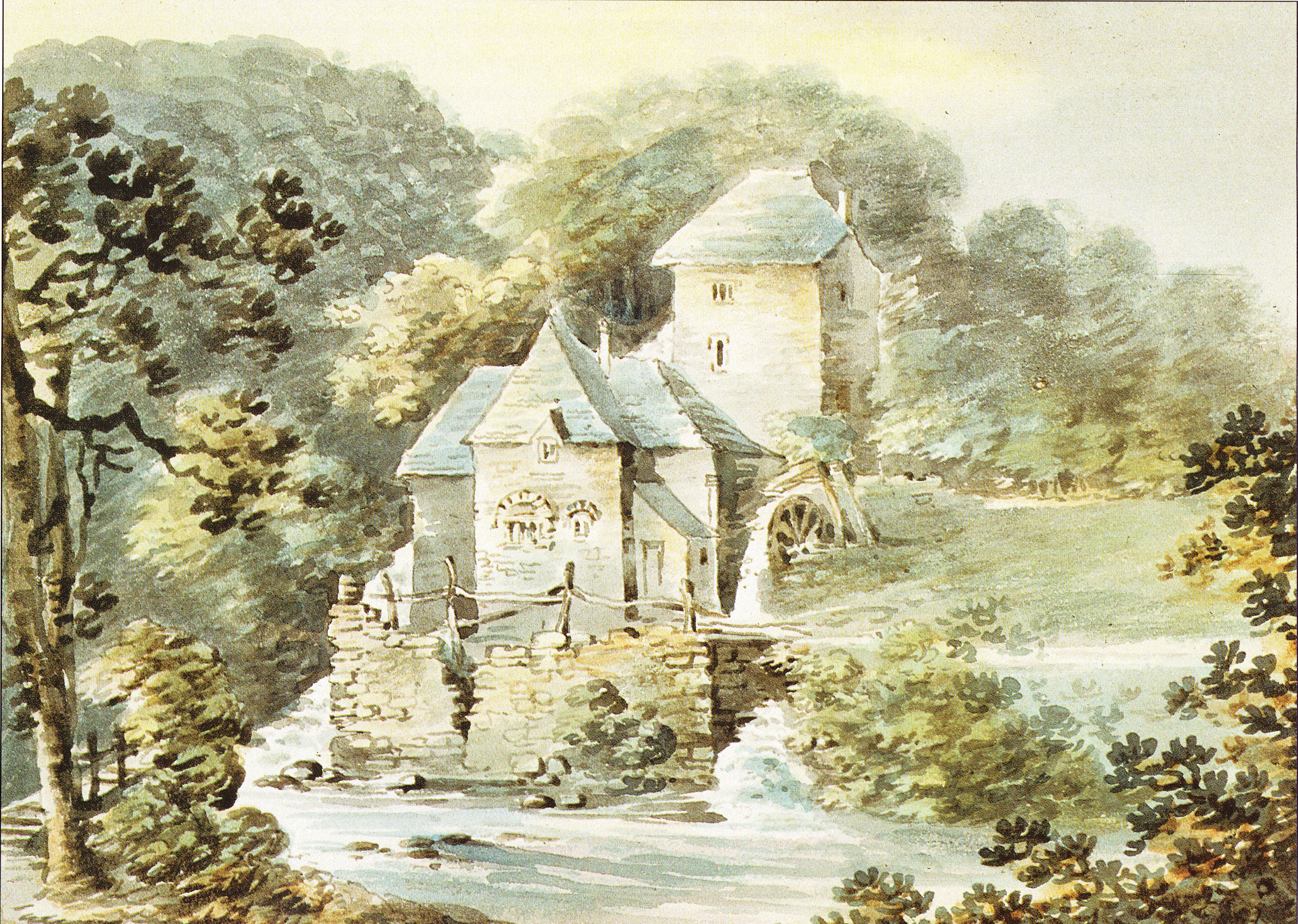
"Nuneham Mills", one of three 1797 watercolours by Rev. John Swete (d.1821) of the mill attached to the manor of Newnham. Devon Record Office 564M/F13/65

Newnham (since circa 1718 Old Newnham) in the parish of Plympton St Mary in Devon is a historic estate long held by the Devonshire gentry family of Strode. The ancient mansion house is situated 1 mile north-east of St Mary's Church, beside the Smallhanger Brook, a tributary of the Tory Brook, itself flowing into the River Plym. The house was abandoned by the Strode family in about 1700 when they built a new mansion on the site of Loughtor Manor House, about 1/3 mile to the north-east of Old Newnham.

Monuments to the Strode family survive in St Mary's Church, Plympton, including the canopied stone effigy of Richard Strode (d.1464), showing a recumbent knight clad in armour. The mural monument of William II Strode (d.1637) and his family shows him kneeling with his two wives on either side and ten children below. The kneeling effigy mural monument to his daughter Ursula Strode, the wife of Sir John III Chichester of Hall, North Devon, survives in Bishop's Tawton Church. A notable member of this family and William II Strode's second son was the parliamentarian Sir William Strode (1594–1645), one of the Five Members whom King Charles I attempted to arrest in the House of Commons in 1642. In 1538 following the Dissolution of the Monasteries the Strode family purchased the demesne lands of Plympton Priory the second wealthiest monastery in Devon, and thus greatly expanded their estate. The parliamentary rotten borough of Plympton Erle (abolished following the Reform Act 1832) was controlled by the Strode family and the Treby family of Plympton House, and thus several Members of Parliament for the borough were members of these two families or were nominated by them.

== Descent of estate ==
=== de Plympton ===
According to the Devon historian Sir William Pole (d.1635) the descent of the estate of Newnham was as follows:

- Simon de Plimton, in residence during the reign of King Edward I (1272–1307)
- John de Plimton, in residence in 1314

=== de Newenham ===
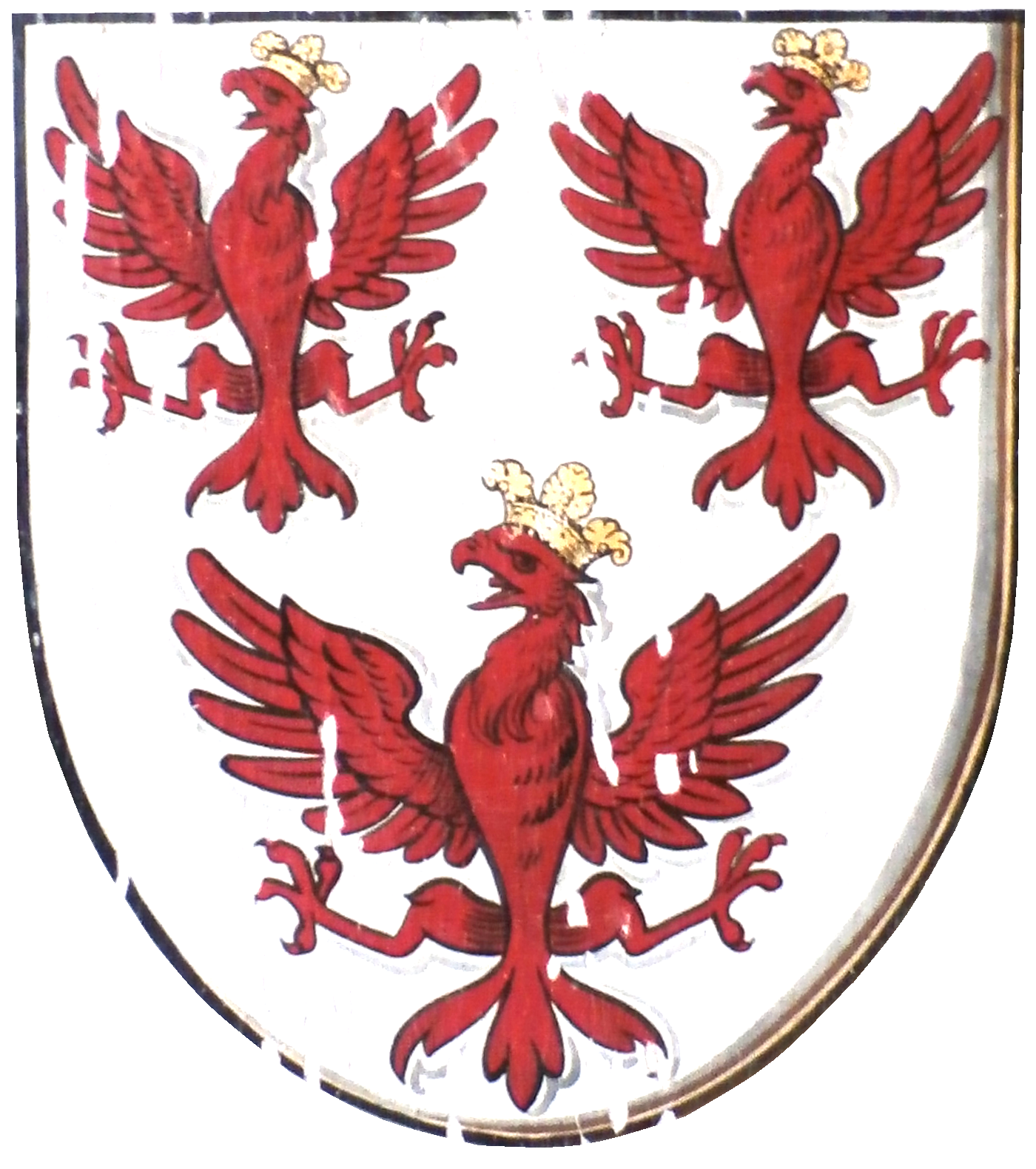
Arms of de Newnham: Argent, three eagles displayed gules crowned or

- Simon de Newenham (son of John de Plimton), who took the surname de Newenham. He married Cicely de Doddescombe, one of the five daughters and co-heiress of John de Doddescombe (fl. temp. King Edward III (1327–1377)) of Doddescombe Leigh and Compton Pole.
- John de Newenham (son)
- Simon de Newenham (son)
- Melior de Newenham (daughter and heiress), who married John Strode of Strode in the parish of Ermington in Devon, to which family thus passed the estate of Newnham.

=== Strode ===
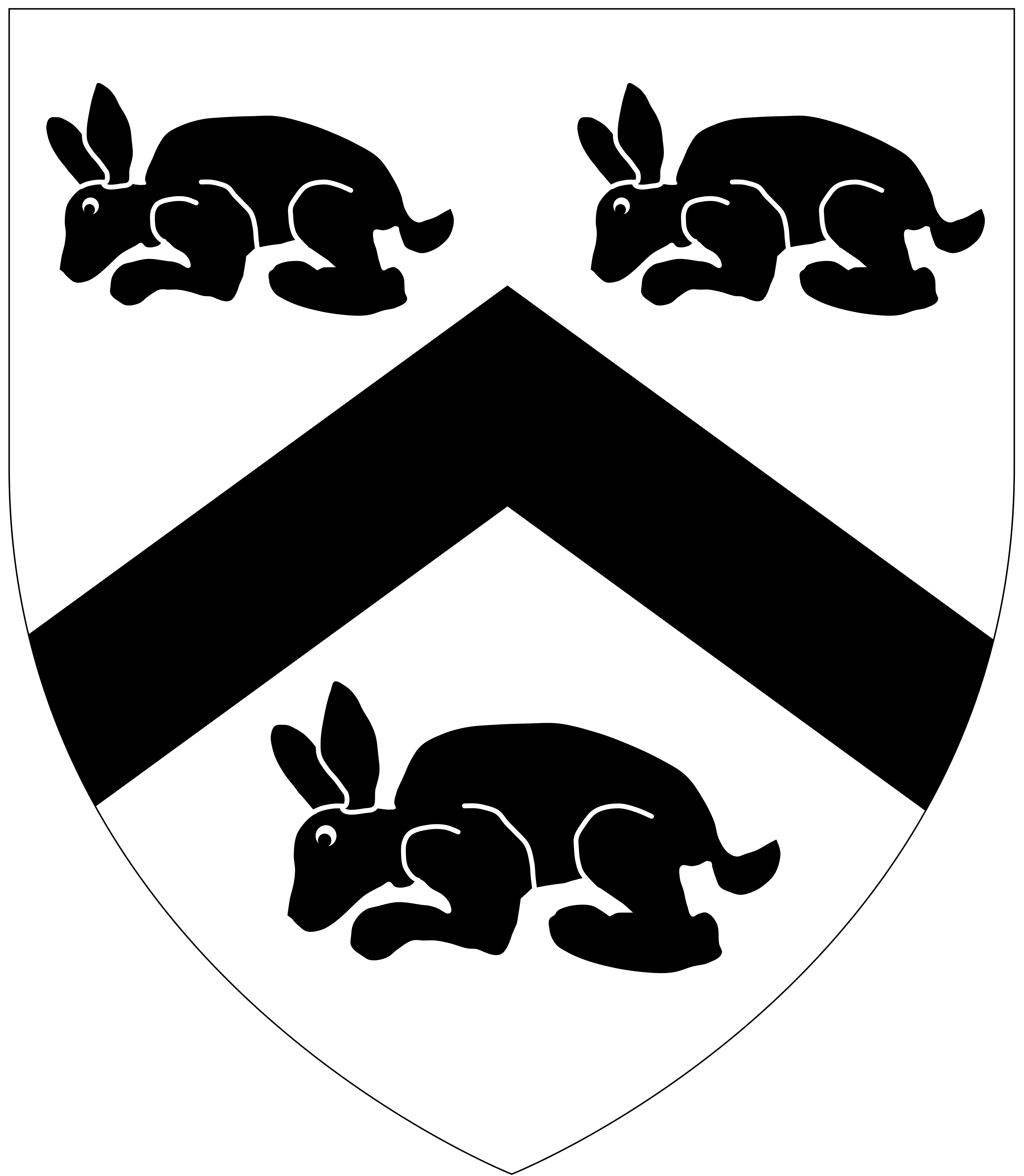
Arms of Strode: Argent, a chevron between three conies courant sable. Detail from mural monument to Sir William IV Strode (1562–1637) in St Mary's Church, Plympton

The de Strode family originated at the estate of Strode in the parish of Ermington in Devon, from which they took their surname. Today's Strode Farmhouse incorporates traces of the ancient former mansion house of the Strodes.

==== Strode of Strode ====
The ancestry of the Strode family of Strode is recorded by Pole as follows:

- Adam de Strode was in residence during the reign of King Henry III (1216–1272) and was one of the gentlemen of Devon summoned by royal herald to attend King Edward I (1272–1307) in his Scottish wars.
- Roger de Strode
- Richard I de Strode
- William I de Strode
- John I de Strode
- Reginald de Strode, who married Florence
- John II de Strode (son), who during the reign of King Henry IV (1399–1413) married Melior de Newnham, heiress of Newnham. The Strodes thenceforth made Newnham their principal residence, although they were still in possession of the estate of Strode in the early 17th century.

==== Strode of Newnham ====
The descent of the Strode family of Newnham is as follows:

===== John II de Strode =====
John II de Strode, who during the reign of King Henry IV (1399–1413) married Melior de Newnham, daughter and heiress of Simon de Newenham.

===== John III Strode =====
John III Strode (son) who married Joane Burley, daughter of a certain Burley of Clanacombe

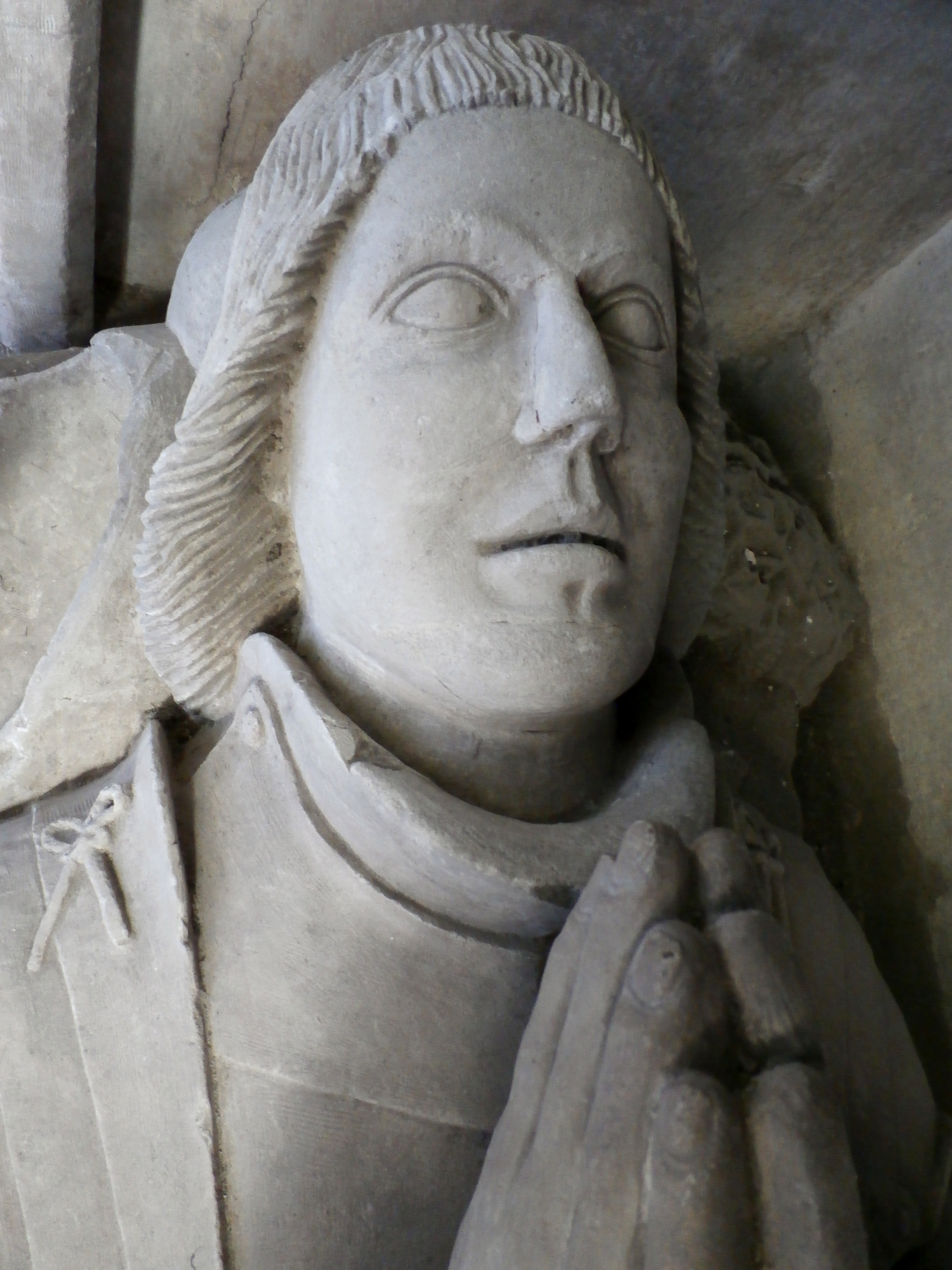
Effigy of Richard II Strode (d.1464) of Newnham, detail from his canopied monument in St Mary's Church, Plympton

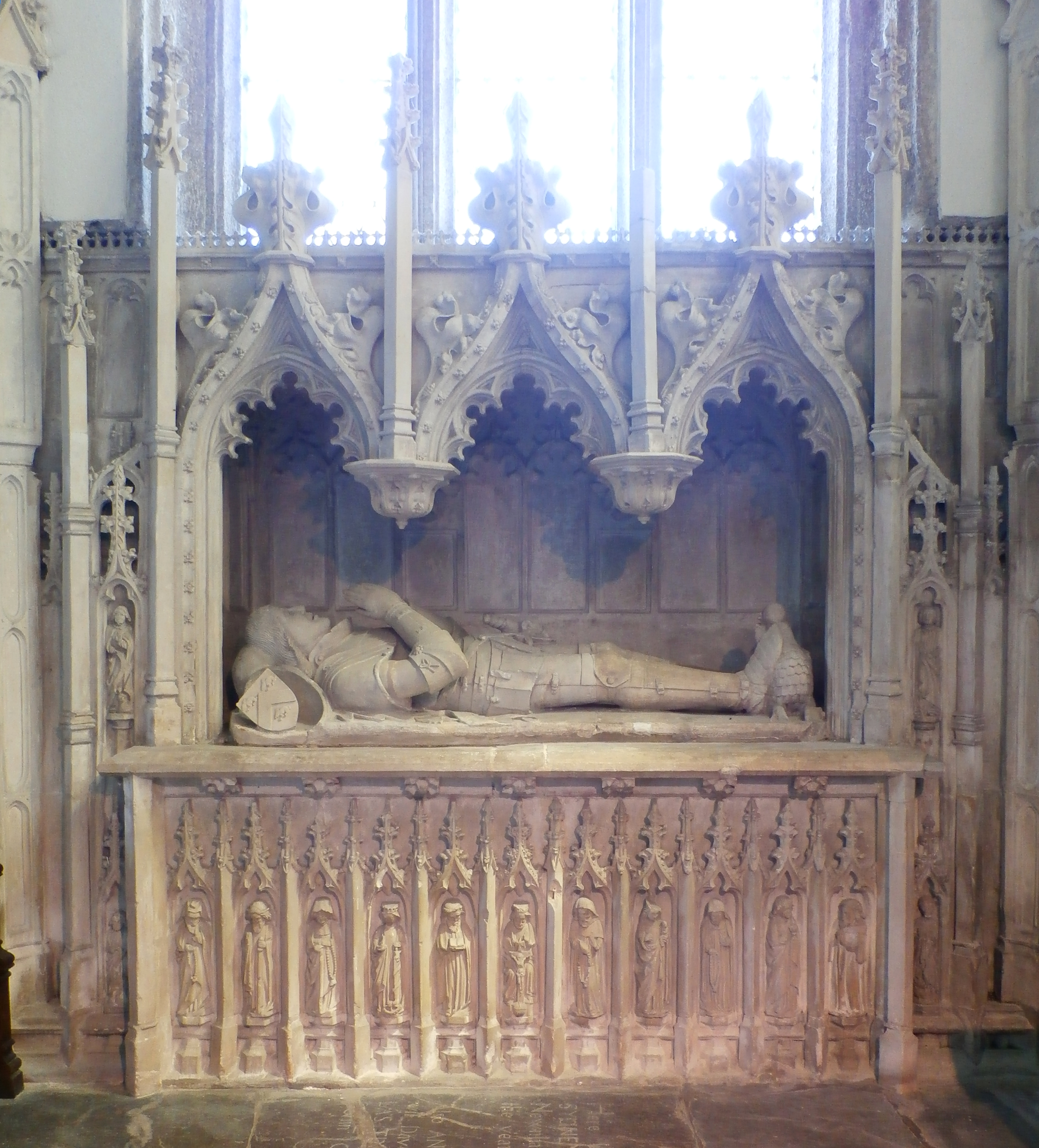
Monument to Richard II Strode (d.1464) of Newnham. St Mary's Church, Plympton

===== Richard II Strode (d.1464) =====
Richard II Strode (d.1464) (son), who married Margaret Fortescue, a daughter of Sir Henry Fortescue (fl. 1426), Lord Chief Justice of the Common Pleas in Ireland, who had married as his first wife Jane Bozun, daughter of Edmond Bozun of Wood in the parish of Woodleigh, Devon, and Wood became the residence of his son and heir John Fortescue, and passed to his male descendants for three generations and then to Fortescue cousins. Sir Henry was a younger son of the Fortescue family whose earliest known seat in Devon was Wympstone in the parish of Modbury, later Earls Fortescue seated at Castle Hill, Filleigh. Richard II Strode's canopied effigy survives in St Mary's Church, Plympton, against the north chancel aisle of the north aisle chapel.

===== William II Strode (d.1518) =====
William II Strode (d.1518) (eldest son), who married three times without progeny

===== Richard III Strode =====
Richard III Strode (brother), who married Joan Pennalls, daughter of Ellis Pennalls of Plympton. Possibly identical in person to Richard Strode (floruit 1512) who was MP for Plympton Erle in 1512 and was responsible for having instigated Strode's case, one of the earliest and most important English legal cases dealing with parliamentary privilege.

===== Richard IV Strode (d.1552) =====
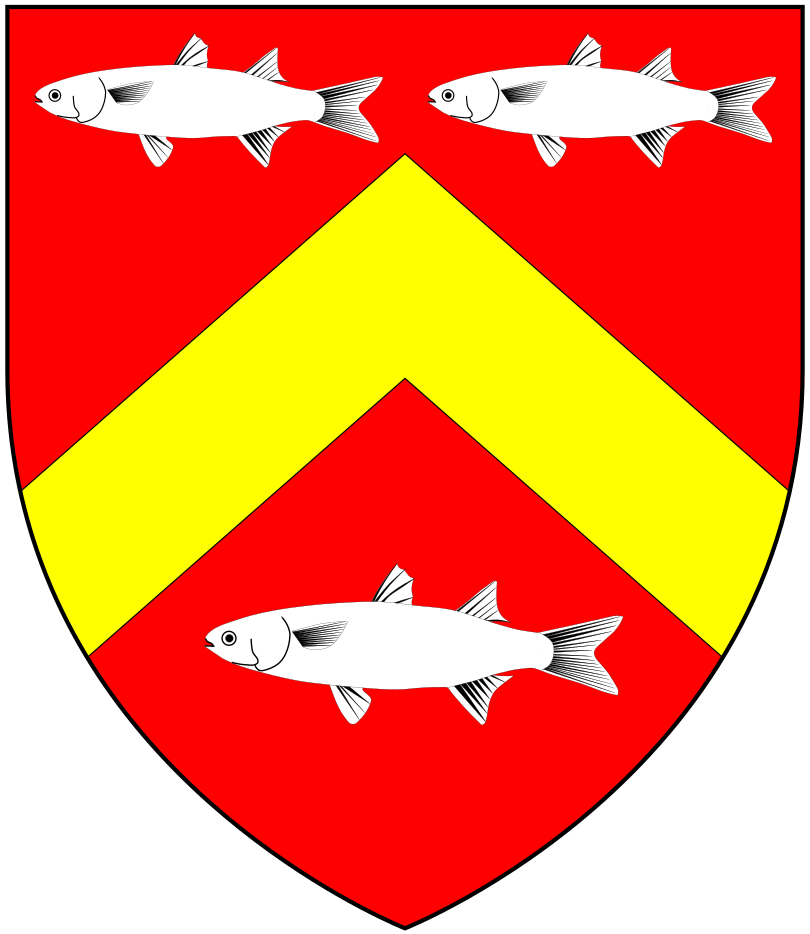
Canting arms of Militon: Gules, a chevron or between three millets hauriant argent

Richard IV Strode (d.1552)(son), who married Agnes Milliton, daughter of John Milliton of Meavy, about 6 miles north of Newnham. Meavy was later one of the residences of Sir William IV Strode (1562–1637), and later became the seat of the latter's 2nd son William Strode (1594–1645), MP. In 1538 following the Dissolution of the Monasteries Richard IV purchased the demesne lands of Plympton Priory the second wealthiest monastery in Devon, and thus greatly expanded his estate.

===== William III Strode (1512-1579) =====
William III Strode (1512–1579) (son), married his neighbour Elizabeth Courtenay, daughter and heiress of Philip Courtenay of Loughtor, a younger son of Sir Philip Courtenay (d.1488) of Molland in North Devon. Thus Loughtor passed into the possession of the Strode family. The mansion house of the estate of Loughtor was situated within the parish of Plympton St Mary, on a hill about 1/3 mile north-east of Newnham, and to this site the Strode family later moved its residence, where in about 1700 a new mansion house was built near or on the site of Loughtor House and named "Newnham Park", which survives today. The Courtenay family of Molland were a junior branch of the Courtenay family of Powderham, itself a junior branch of the Courtenay Earls of Devon, feudal barons of Plympton and feudal barons of Okehampton, seated at Tiverton Castle. The canopied effigy of William Courtenay of Loughtor survives, in a mutilated state, in St Mary's Church, Plympton. The 6th son of William III Strode (1512–1579) was Rev. Sampson Strode (born 1552), rector of Dittisham, whose great-great-grandson was Richard Strode (1750–1790) of Boterford, who inherited the ancient estates of the senior Strodes on the failure of the male line of Strode of Newnham, following the death in 1767 of William Strode of Newnham. The 4th son was Philip Strode (d.1605) who married Wilmot Houghton, daughter of William Houghton of Houghton Towers, Lancaster, and was the father of William Strode (1602–1644), Doctor of Divinity and Public Orator of Oxford University, one of the Worthies of Devon of John Prince (d.1723), who called him "this reverend divine, this rare poet, this charming orator".

===== Richard V Strode (d.1581) =====
Richard V Strode (d.1581) (son), who married Frances Cromwell, first cousin of King Edward VI (1547–1553). Frances was a daughter of Gregory Cromwell, 1st Baron Cromwell (c. 1520 – 1551) (only son of Thomas Cromwell, 1st Earl of Essex (c.1485 – 1540), chief minister of King Henry VIII) by his wife Elizabeth Seymour, sister of Queen Jane Seymour and sister of Edward Seymour, 1st Duke of Somerset (c. 1500-1552) uncle and Lord Protector of King Edward VI.

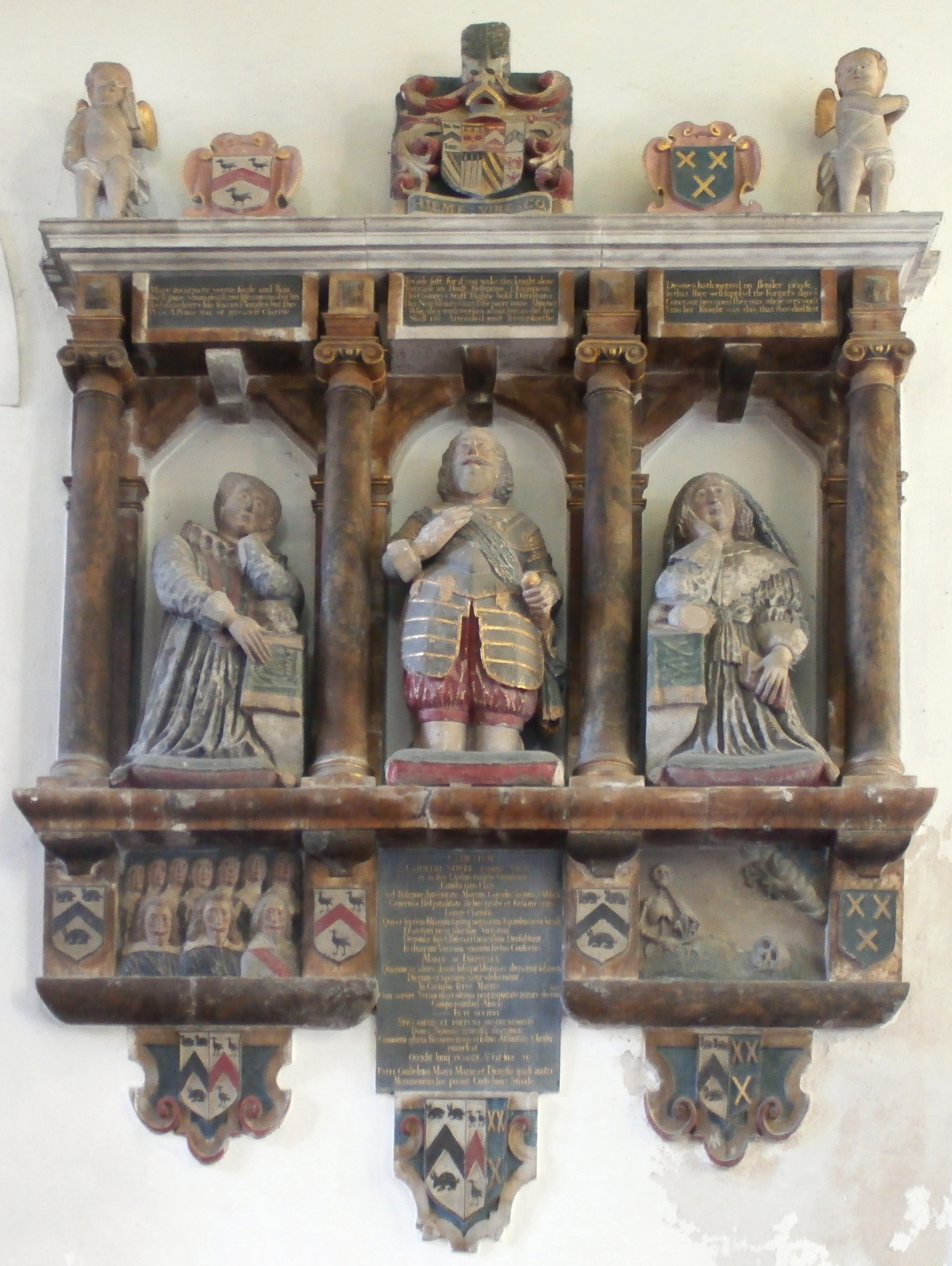
Mural monument to Sir William IV Strode (d.1637), his 2 wives and 10 children, St Mary's Church, Plympton

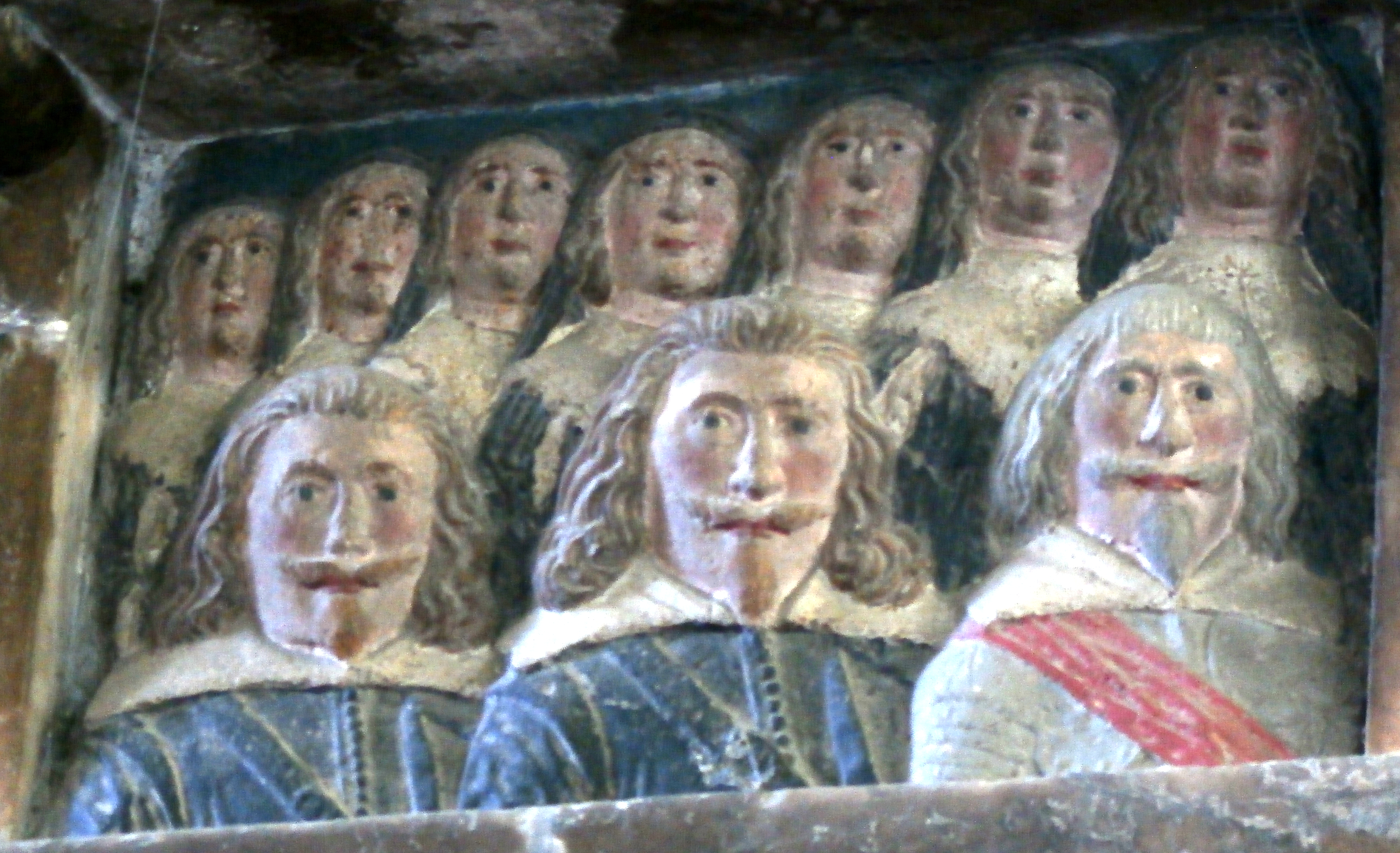
Relief sculpted panel depicting the progeny of Sir William IV Strode (d.1637) of Newnham, detail from the latter's mural monument in St Mary's Church, Plympton. The eldest son (right) is Sir Richard VI Strode (1584–1669) and the 2nd son (middle) is William Strode (1594–1645), MP, one of the Five Members, who erected the monument

===== Sir William IV Strode (1562-1637) =====
Sir William IV Strode (1562–1637) (son), whose mural monument survives in St Mary's Church, Plympton. He was MP for Devon in 1597 and 1624, for Plympton Erle in 1601, 1604, 1621 and 1625, and for Plymouth in 1614, was High Sheriff of Devon from 1593 to 1594 and was Deputy Lieutenant of Devon from 1599. His 2nd son was William Strode (1594–1645), MP, one of the Five Members whose impeachment and attempted unconstitutional arrest by King Charles I in the House of Commons in 1642 sparked the Civil War.

===== Sir Richard VI Strode (1584-1669) =====
Sir Richard VI Strode (1584–1669) (eldest son), also resident at Chalmington in Dorset, who served as MP for Bere Alston in 1604, Bridport in 1626 and for Plympton Erle in 1640. He was a puritan and during the Civil War a parliamentarian who raised a force of 3,000 dragoons.

===== William V Strode (1614-1676) =====
William V Strode (1614–1676) (son), twice MP for Plympton Erle, in 1660 and 1661-1676.

===== Richard VII Strode (1638-1707) =====
Richard VII Strode (1638–1707) (eldest son from 1st marriage), MP for Plympton Erle. He died unmarried. Together with his near neighbour Sir George Treby (d.1700) of Plympton House, Lord Chief Justice of the Common Pleas, also an MP for Plympton Erle, he financed the building of Plympton Guildhall which he gave to the Borough of Plympton.

===== William Strode (d.1718) =====
William Strode (d.1718) (half-brother), died without progeny.

===== Sidney II Strode (1684-1721) =====
Sidney II Strode (1684–1721), (nephew, son of Sidney I Strode (1655–1712), younger brother of William Strode (d.1718)), who abandoned Old Newnham and moved his residence to the manor of Loughtor, 1/3 mile to the north-east, where he rebuilt the manor house and called it "Newnham Park" He married Ann Trevanion, daughter of Sir Nicholas Trevanion, by whom he had a son William Strode (1718–1767) who died without progeny, when the heir to Newnham became his distant cousin Richard Strode (1750–1790) of Boterford, North Huish, Devon, descended from William Strode (d.1579) of Newnham by his wife Elizabeth Courtenay, heiress of Loughtor.

For further descents of this family up to 2014 see Newnham Park

==== Let to tenants ====
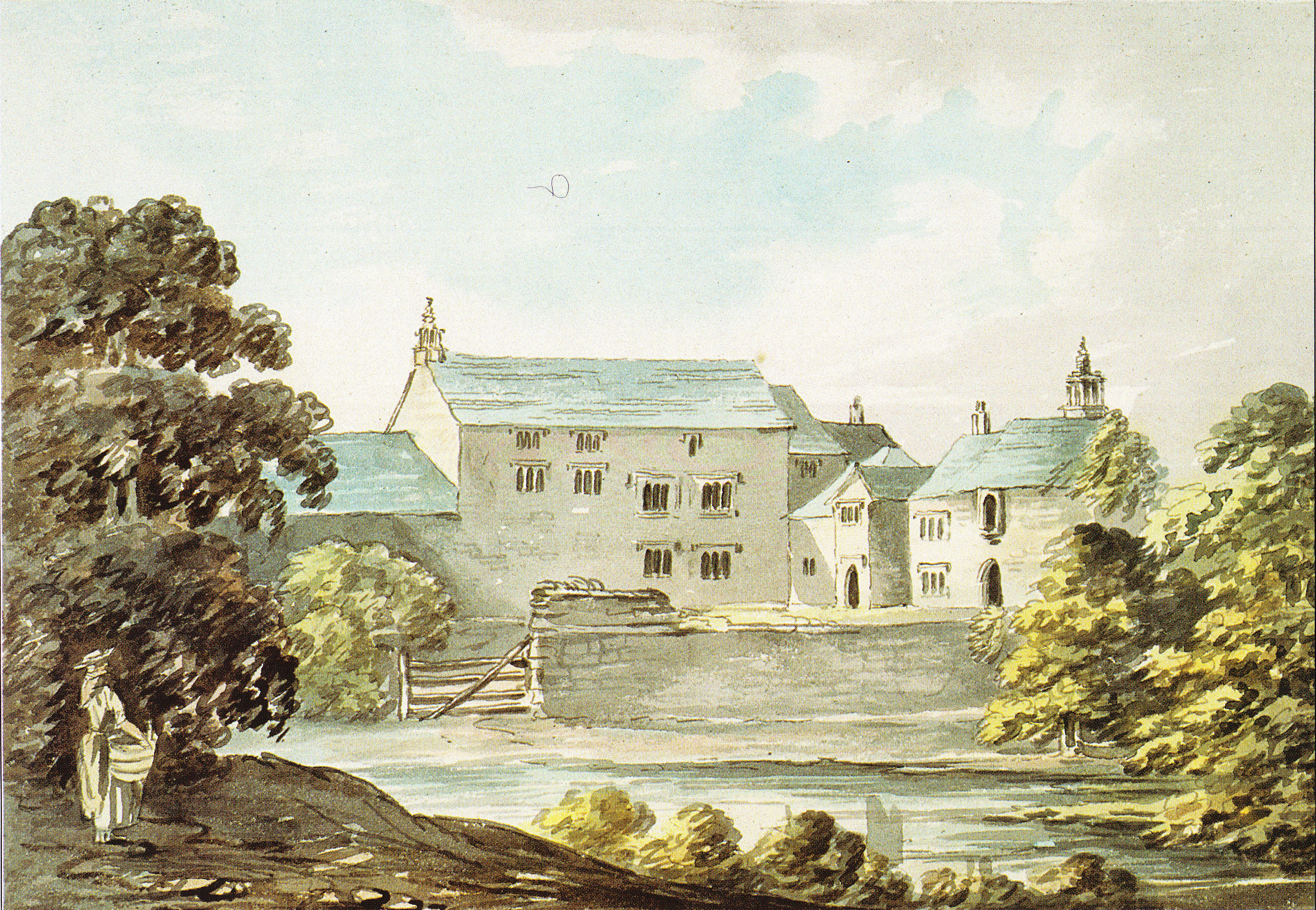
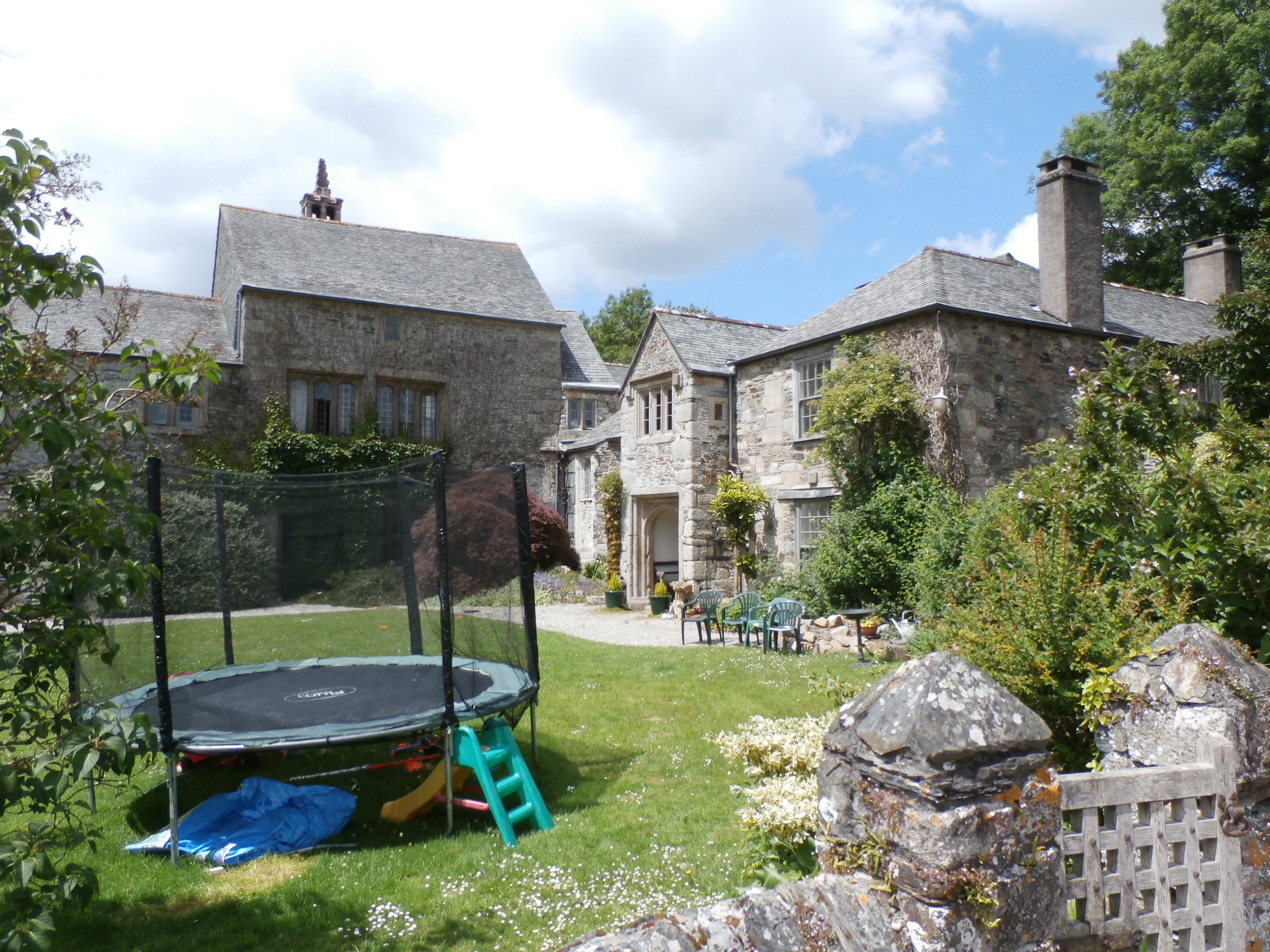
Left:"Nuneham Old House", 1797 watercolour by Rev John Swete (1752–1821), view looking north-west; right: the same view in 2014

Following the removal of Sidney II Strode (1684–1721) to Loughtor ("Newnham Park"), Old Newnham was let to tenants. In 1797 Rev John Swete visited Old Newnham, which he painted in watercolour, and made the following entry in his travel journal, having just visited Newnham Park:

"Reluctantly therefore quitting a scenery so very picturesque I returned by the mill to the public road on which I had rode but a short way when from a rising of a hill I had a prospect of an old mansion in a bottom on the left, its appearance was exceedingly antique, of the architecture which subsisted two or three centuries past. In a guess that I made as to this edifice being Old Newnham, I found from the information gained from a labourer, that I was right...This mansion, the remains of which even now were respectable...The pile of buildings was large and apparently constructed at different periods. It was now inhabited, and had been for a considerable time, by a farmer who rented part of the demesne and much of it seem'd in a state of dilapidation. Having from within a gate of the courtyard taken hastily the foregoing sketch, I proceeded toward Cornwood..."

=== Old Newnham in 2014 ===
In 2014 Old Newnham House, having been converted into two residences, is in multiple ownership. The landed estate however forms part of the 1,550 acre estate of Newnham Park, formerly Loughtor. Part of the land now forms the Newnham Industrial Estate, a few hundred yards to the west of Old Newnham House. In 2014 Newnham Park mansion house and estate are still owned by a descendant of the Strode family, via female lines, in the person of David Michael Strode Cobbald (born 1961), who operates the estate as a clay-pigeon shooting ground and benefits from various mineral mines on the estate.

== Sources ==
- Vivian, Lt.Col. J.L., (Ed.) The Visitations of the County of Devon: Comprising the Heralds' Visitations of 1531, 1564 & 1620, Exeter, 1895, pp. 718–20, pedigree of Strode of Newnham
- Pole, Sir William (d.1635), Collections Towards a Description of the County of Devon, Sir John-William de la Pole (ed.), London, 1791, pp. 329–10, Newenham & Loughtorre
- Risdon, Tristram (d.1640), Survey of Devon, 1811 edition, London, 1811, with 1810 Additions, pp. 197–8, 395, Newnham & Loughter
- Pevsner, Nikolaus & Cherry, Bridget, The Buildings of England: Devon, London, 2004, pp. 582–4, Old Newnham & Newnham Park
- Burke's Genealogical and Heraldic History of the Landed Gentry, 15th Edition, ed. Pirie-Gordon, H., London, 1937, pp. 2172–3, Strode of Newnham Park
- Gray, Todd & Rowe, Margery (Eds.), Travels in Georgian Devon: The Illustrated Journals of The Reverend John Swete, 1789-1800, 4 vols., Tiverton, 1999, vil 4, pp. 17–20
