= Newnham Park =

Historic estate in Devon, England

Coordinates: 50.4035°N 4.0338°W

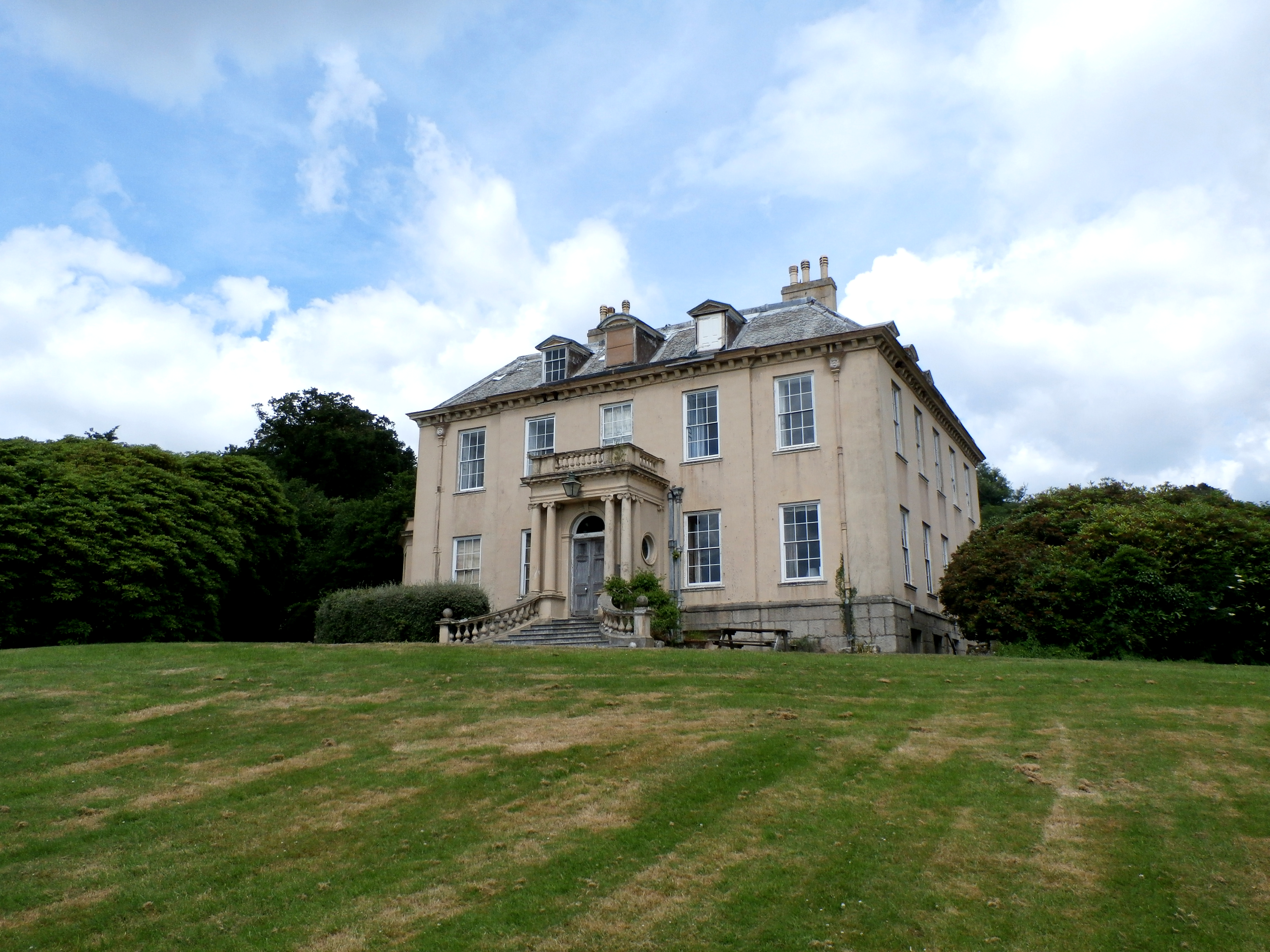
Newnham Park, built circa 1720, viewed in 2014

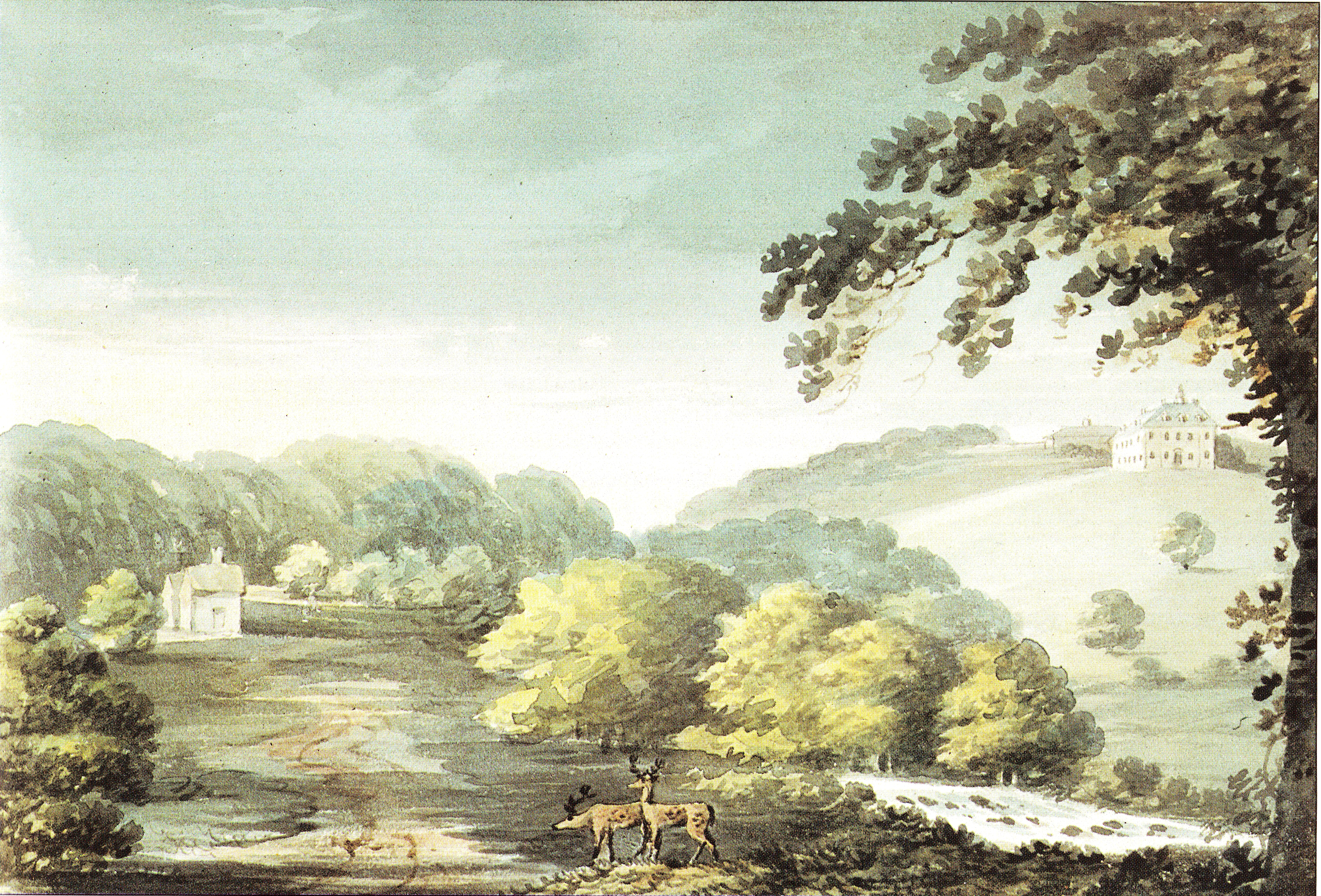
"Nuneham, seat of ... Stroud Esq.", 1797 watercolour of Newnham Park (mansion house far right) by Rev John Swete (1789-1800). Devon Record Office 564M/F13/73

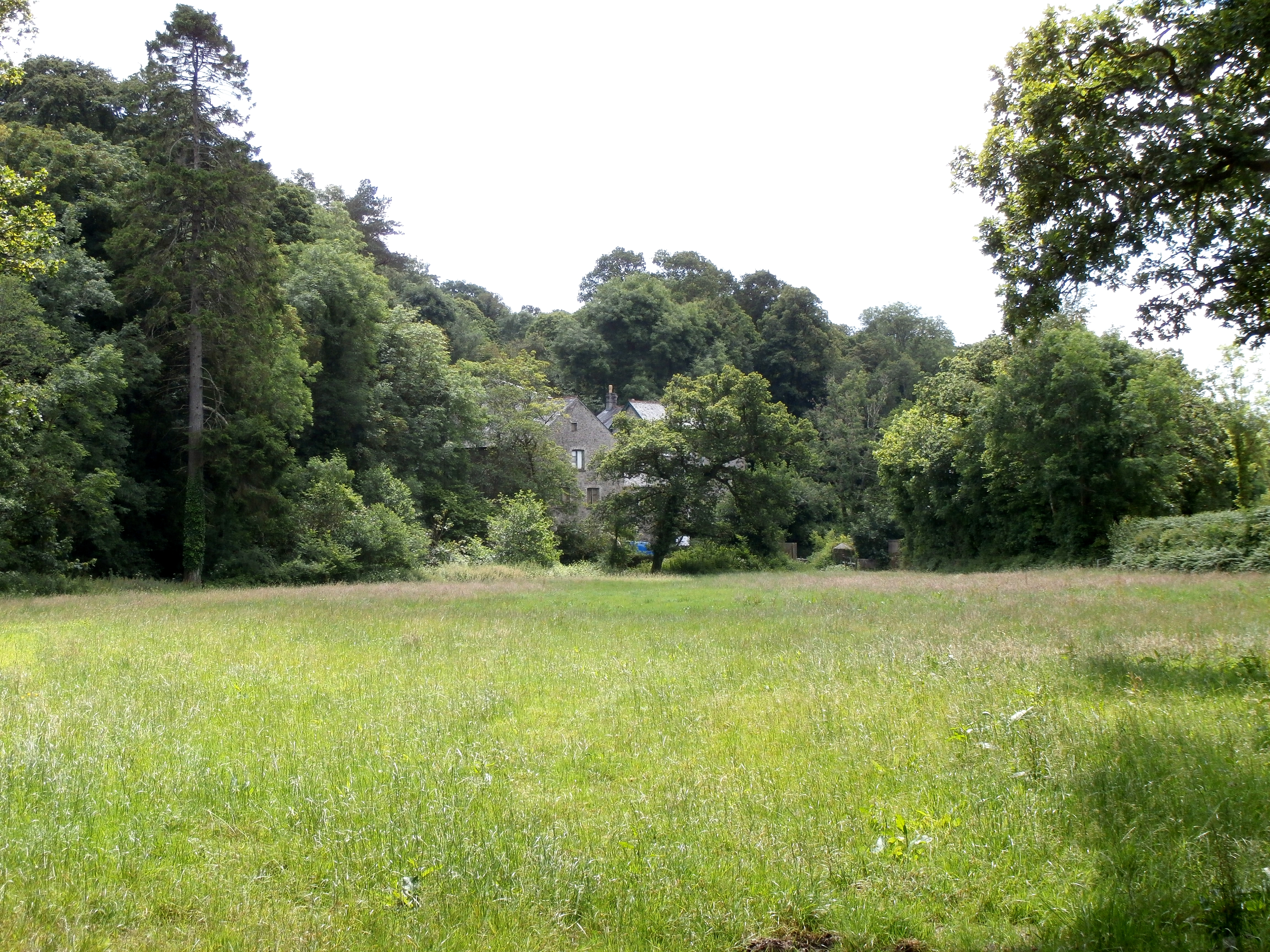
Setting of Loughtor Mill, viewed from within the Newnham Park parkland

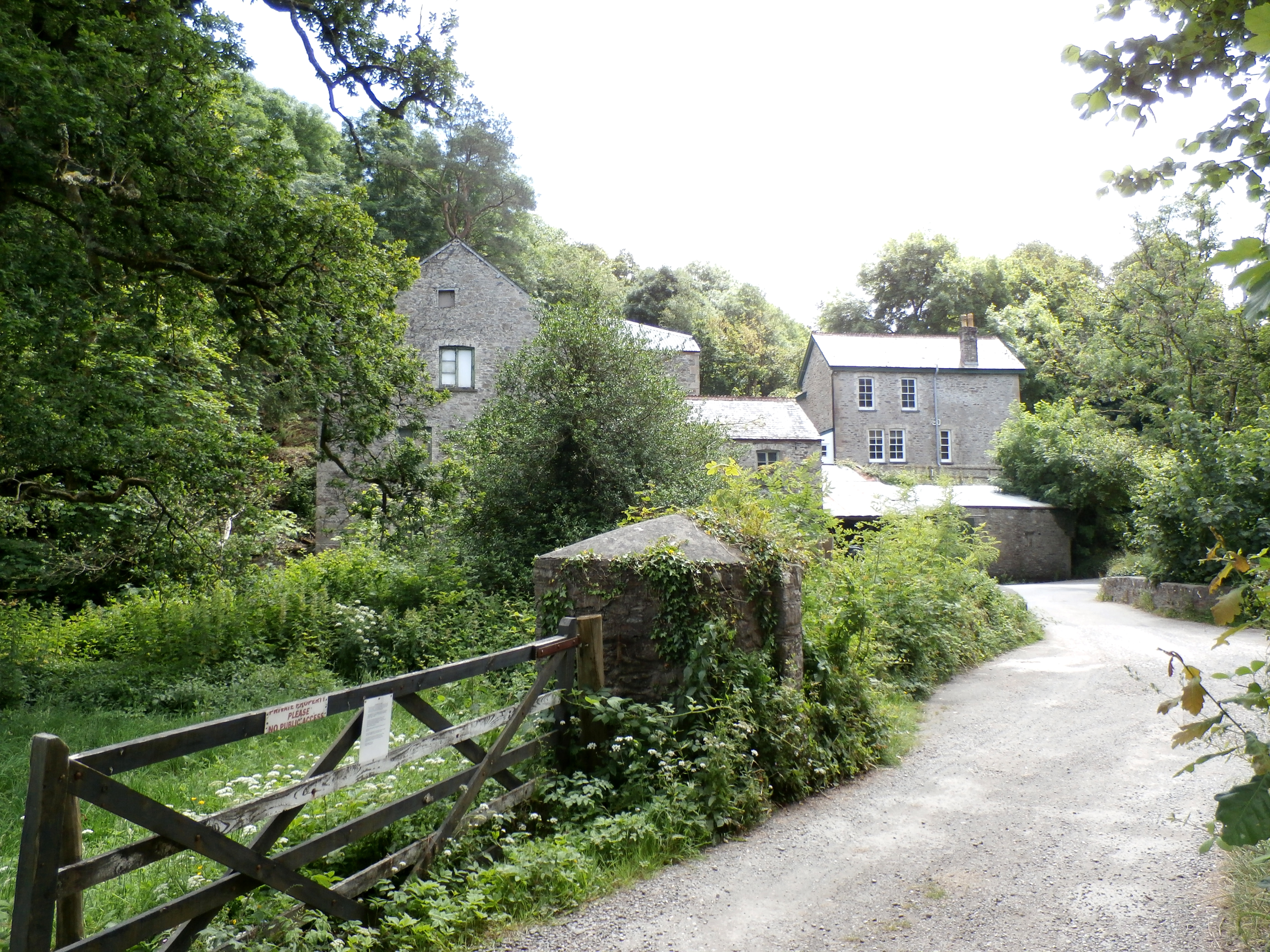
Loughtor Mill, on the Newnham Park estate, in 2014 occupied by a motor repair garage

Newnham Park (before circa 1718 Loughtor) is an historic estate in the civil parish of Sparkwell, Devon, UK. It was known as Loughtor until about 1700 when the ancient Strode family, long seated at Newnham, about 1 mile south-east of the manor house of Loughtor, abandoned Newnham and moved their residence to Loughtor (which they had inherited by a marriage in the 16th century) where they built a new mansion house which they renamed "Newnham Park". In 2014 the mansion house with an estate of about 1,550 acres is still owned by a descendant (via various female lines) of the Courtenay and Strode families which held the estate from the 15th century, and which were well established in the county of Devon long before that time. In 2014 part of the estate is operated as a commercial clay-pigeon shooting ground.

== Descent ==
Sir William Pole (d.1635) relates the early holders of Loughtorre as follows:

=== Le Abbé ===
The first recorded holders of Loughtor was the family of Le Abbé (alias Le Abbe, le Abby)

- William Le Abbé of Radford (alias Redford), in the parish of Plymstock, recorded as having held Loughtor in 1242
- Robert Le Abbé
- Henry Le Abbé, of Alsemston
- Walter Le Abbé, whose descendants adopted the surname de Radford

=== de Radford ===
The de Radford family (formerly known as Le Abbé) continued to hold Loughtor, apparently until the 15th century, when the next known holder was William Courtenay, a younger son of Sir Philip Courtenay (d.1488) of Molland in North Devon.

=== Courtenay ===
Arms of Courtenay of Molland: Or, three torteaux a label of three points azure each point charged with three plates

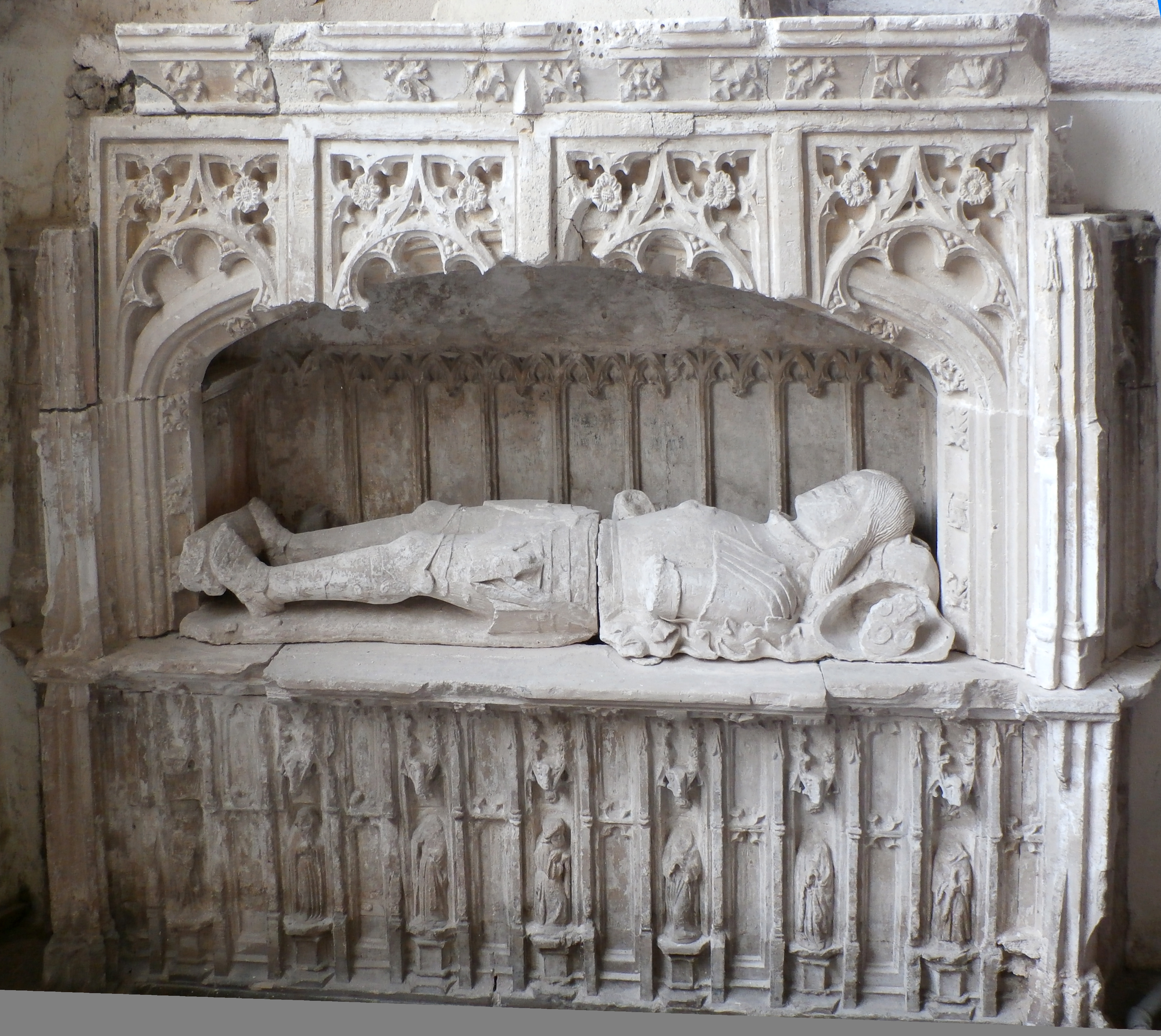
15th century monument to William Courtenay of Loughtor, St Mary's Church, Plympton

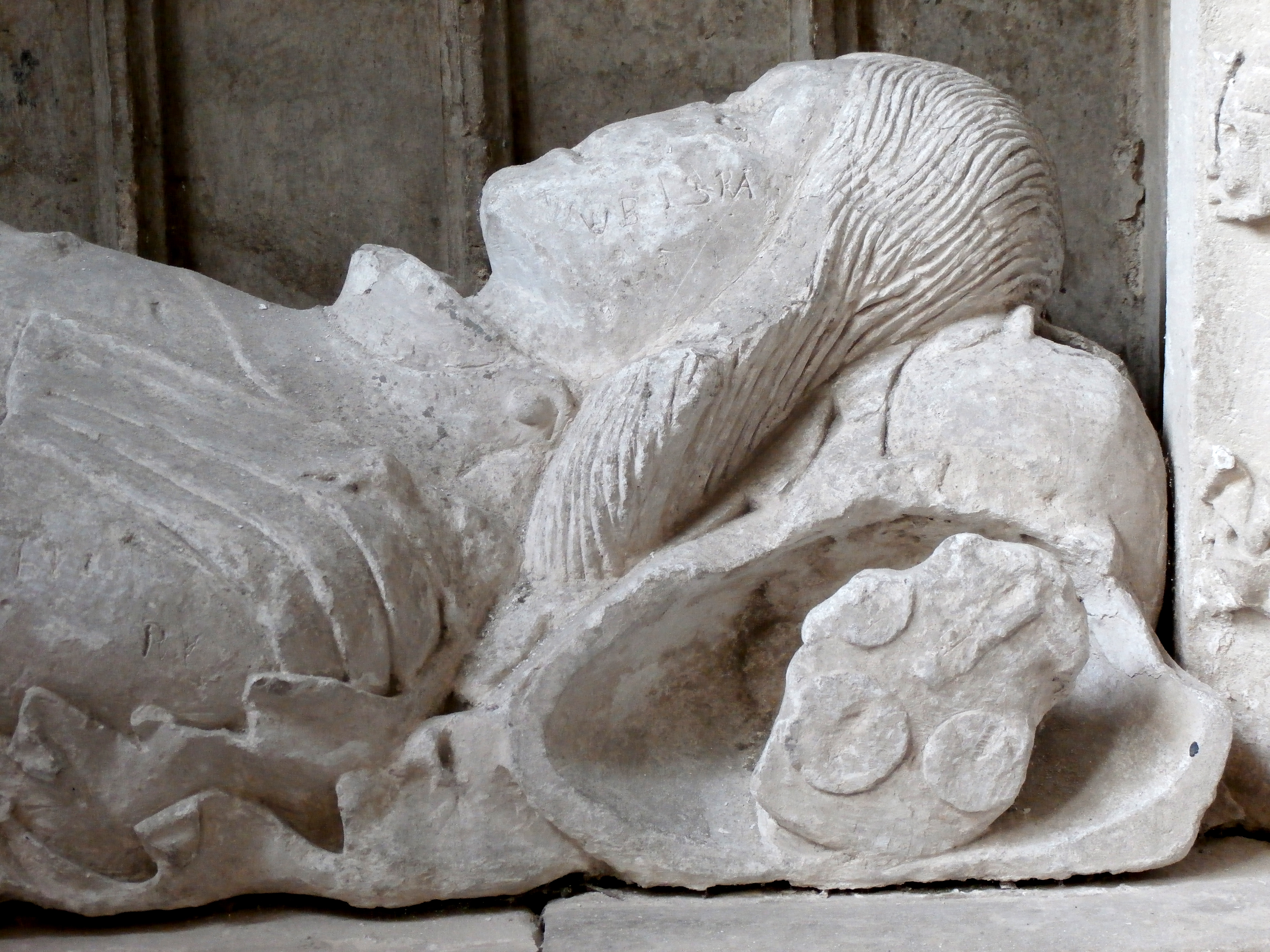
William Courtenay of Loughtor, with mutilated escutcheon within his helm on which rests his head showing arms of Courtenay of Molland: Or, three torteaux a label of three points azure each point charged with three plates. Detail from his 15th century monument in St Mary's Church, Plympton

The next recorded holder following the de Radford tenure was a younger son of the Courtenay family of Molland in North Devon. It is not clear how this family acquired Loughtor, but the feudal barony of Plympton had certainly been held by Hugh Courtenay, 2nd Earl of Devon (1303-1377), seated at Tiverton Castle and Okehampton Castle, from whom the Courtenay family of Molland was descended.

- William Courtenay, a younger son of Sir Philip Courtenay (d.1488) of Molland in North Devon. His monument survives in St Mary's Church, Plympton, against the south wall of the south chancel aisle, consisting of a stone effigy of a recumbent knight on a chest tomb within a canopied niche.
- Sir Philip Courtenay (son), who according to Vivian (p. 251) died without progeny, but according to Pole (p. 330) had a daughter Elizabeth.
- Elizabeth Courtenay. According to Pole (p. 330) she was a daughter of Sir Philip Courtenay of Loughtor, William's son. However, according to Vivian (p. 251) she was the daughter of Philip Courtenay, William's elder brother, by his wife Jane Fowell (d.1523), daughter of Richard Fowell of Fowelscombe in the parish of Ugborough, which former mansion house is today a ruin. Jane Fowell survived her husband and remarried (as his first wife) to Humphrey Prideaux (1487-1550) of Thuborough in the parish of Sutcombe. Elizabeth Courtenay, heiress of Loughtor, married William Strode (1512-1579) of Newnham.

=== Strode ===
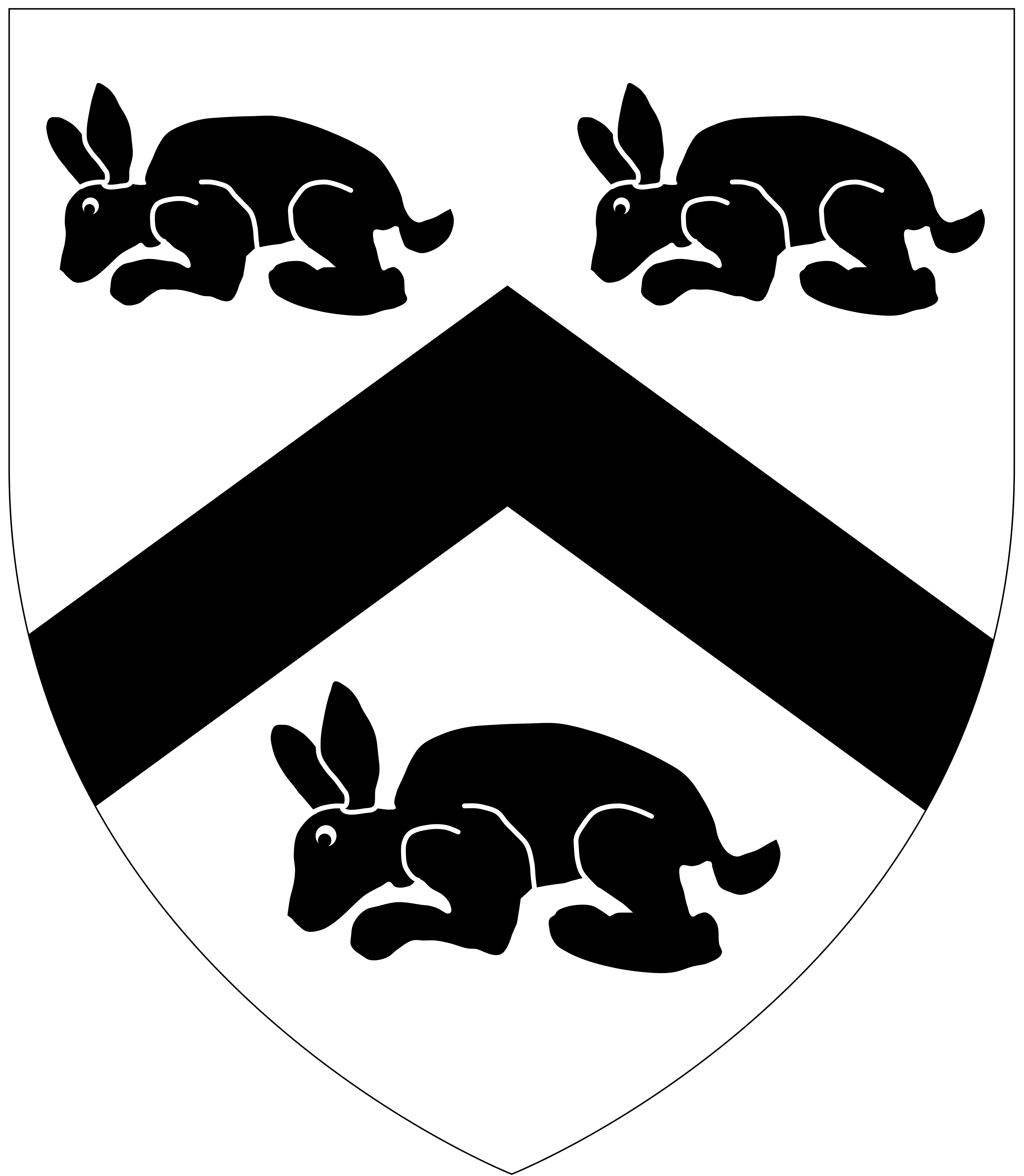
Arms of Strode: Argent, a chevron between three conies courant sable. Detail from mural monument to Sir William IV Strode (1562-1637) in St Mary's Church, Plympton

- William III Strode (1512-1579) of Newnham, who married Elizabeth Courtenay, heiress of Loughtor. He had by Elizabeth several sons and daughters, the eldest son and heir having been Richard V Strode (d.1581). The 6th son however was Rev. Sampson Strode (born 1552), rector of Dittisham, whose great-great-grandson was Richard Strode (1750-1790) of Boterford, who inherited the ancient estates of the senior Strodes on the failure of the male line of Strode of Newnham, following the death in 1767 of William Strode of Newnham. The 4th son was Philip Strode (d.1605) who married Wilmot Houghton, daughter of William Houghton of Houghton Towers, Lancaster, and was the father of William Strode (1602-1644), Doctor of Divinity and Public Orator of Oxford University, one of the Worthies of Devon of John Prince (d.1723), who called him "this reverend divine, this rare poet, this charming orator".

For the descent of Loughtor in the Strode family until 1718 see Newnham (Old).

Until 1718 it is not clear what use, if any, was made by the Strode family of the old manor house of the Courtenays at Loughtor, as they appear to have continued to reside chiefly at "Old Newnham". The first of the Strodes to live at Loughtor was:

- Sidney II Strode (1684-1721). He was the nephew and heir of William Strode (d.1718) of Newnham who died without progeny. Sidney II was the son of Sidney I Strode (1655-1712), who had died before his elder brother and thus did not himself inherit. Sidney II thus inherited the Strode estates aged 34, only 3 years before his own death in 1721, but during that short time abandoned Old Newnham and moved his residence to the manor of Loughtor, 1/3 mile to the north-east, where he rebuilt the manor house and called it "Newnham Park" He married Ann Trevanion, daughter of Sir Nicholas Trevanion, by whom he had a son William Strode (1718-1767)
- William Strode (1718-1767) (son), who died without progeny, when the heir to Newnham Park and the other estates became his distant cousin Richard Strode (1750-1790) of Boterford. descended from William Strode (d.1579) of Newnham by his wife Elizabeth Courtenay, heiress of Loughtor.
- Richard Strode (1750-1790) of Boterford, North Huish, Devon, (cousin), descended from William Strode (d.1579) of Newnham by his wife Elizabeth Courtenay, heiress of Loughtor. He resided at Newnham Park and in 1788 sold his family's former seat of Boterford and another estate at Whitecombe to Thomas Palk. He married Admonition Lear, daughter of Thomas Lear of Sandwell in the parish of Harberton. A prominent branch of this family was founded by Sir Peter Lear, 1st Baronet (died c. 1684) of Lindridge.
- William Strode (d.1802) (eldest son and heir), died unmarried. One of his younger brothers was Capt. Thomas Lear Strode (1787-1817), 43rd Regiment of Foot, whose mural monument survives in St Mary's Church, Plympton.
- Rev. Richard Strode (1779-1819) (brother), who married Harriet Rogers, daughter of Sir Frederick Rogers, 5th Baronet (1746–1797), MP, of Wisdome, Devon. All four of his daughters died young, and his mural monument survives in St Mary's Church, Plympton.
- George Sidney Strode (1780-1857) (brother), Sheriff of Devon in 1825. He married Dorothea Bird Symons (d.1862), daughter of William Symons of Chaddle Wood, Plympton.
- George Sidney Strode (1829-1874) (son), OBE, Provincial Grandmaster of the Freemasons. He married but died without progeny.
- Dorothea Georgina Admonition Strode (1823-1896) (eldest sister)

=== Lowe (Strode) ===
- George Sydney Strode Lowe (nephew). He was the son of Dorothea's younger sister Florence Strode by her husband Admiral Arthur Lowe (1814-1882) of Burford, Shropshire. In 1897 in accordance with the bequest he changed his name by royal licence to Strode and adopted the arms of Strode. He married Anna Fielding Boyd, daughter of Thomson Boyd of Edinburgh, by whom he left two daughters and co-heiresses:
  - Anna Strode, who in 1912 married Henry Grigg (d.1935) of Cann House, Tamerton Foliot
  - Eileen Strode (1893-1950), who in 1932 married Col. Edward Valle-Pope (1898-1968), and left a daughter Judith Eileen Strode Valle-Pope (born 1934).

=== Cobbold ===
In 1955 Judith Eileen Strode Valle-Pope (born 1934) married Michael Maurice Cobbold (1931-2002), descended from an old Suffolk brewing dynasty, a professional soldier, engineer, publisher, preserver of ancient buildings and sheep-farmer. In 1969 Judith Cobbold (née Valle-Pope) inherited Newnham Park with its 1,550 acre estate, and with her husband developed the estate as a corporate entertainment business including shooting, archery, carriage-driving and off-road vehicles and moto-cross. Her son David Michael Strode Cobbold (born 1961) is the owner of Newnham Park in 2014.

== Sources ==
- Vivian, Lt.Col. J.L., (Ed.) The Visitations of the County of Devon: Comprising the Heralds' Visitations of 1531, 1564 & 1620, Exeter, 1895, pp. 718–20, pedigree of Strode of Newnham
- Pole, Sir William (d.1635), Collections Towards a Description of the County of Devon, Sir John-William de la Pole (ed.), London, 1791, pp. 329–10, Newenham & Loughtorre
- Risdon, Tristram (d.1640), Survey of Devon, 1811 edition, London, 1811, with 1810 Additions, pp. 197–8, 395, Newnham & Loughter
- Pevsner, Nikolaus & Cherry, Bridget, The Buildings of England: Devon, London, 2004, pp. 582–4, Old Newnham & Newnham Park
- Burke's Genealogical and Heraldic History of the Landed Gentry, 15th Edition, ed. Pirie-Gordon, H., London, 1937, pp. 2172–3, Strode of Newnham Park
- Gray, Todd & Rowe, Margery (Eds.), Travels in Georgian Devon: The Illustrated Journals of The Reverend John Swete, 1789–1800, 4 vols., Tiverton, 1999, vil 4, pp. 17–20
