= William Strode (poet) =

English poet

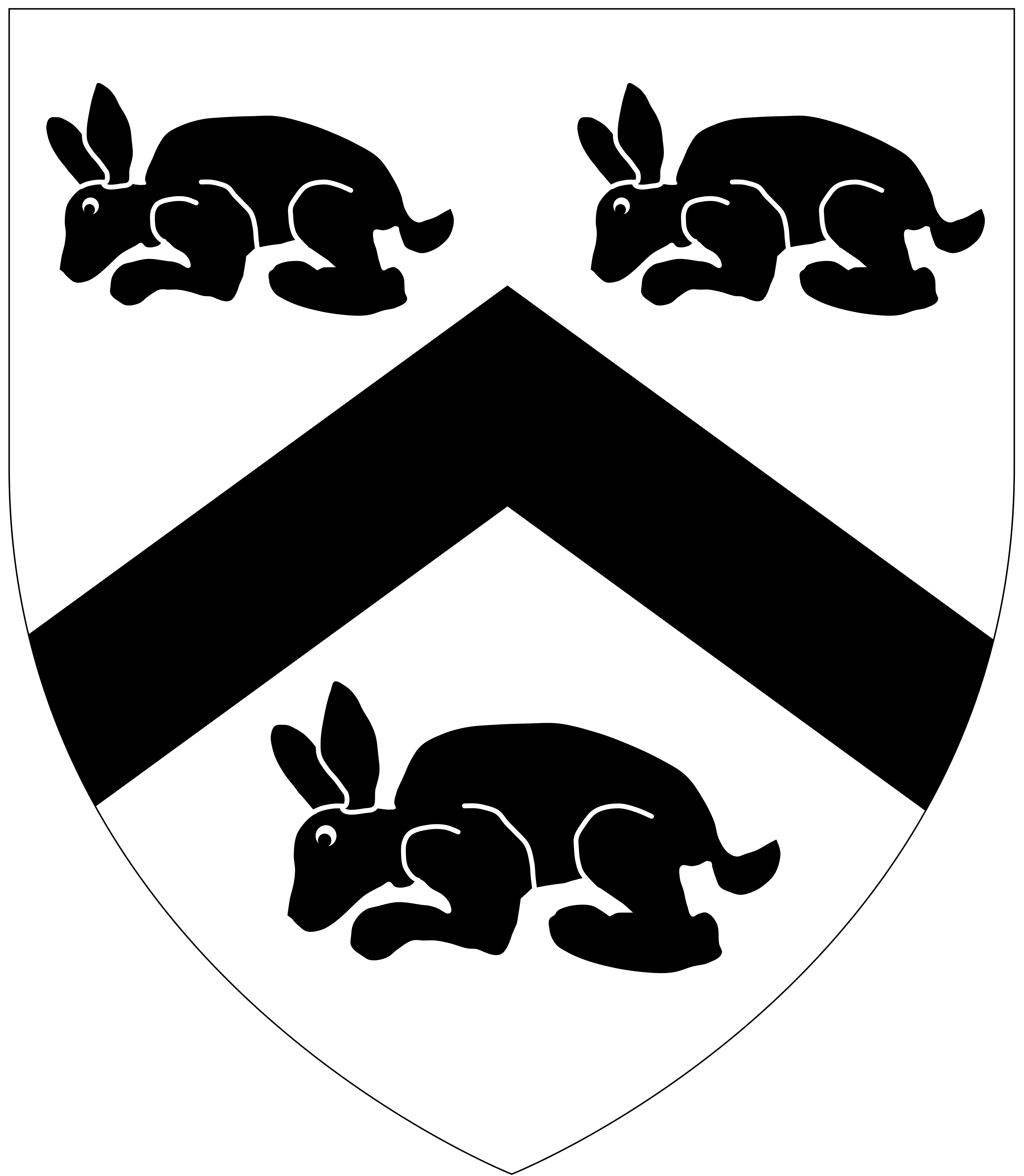
Arms of Strode: Argent, a chevron between three conies courant sable

William Strode (c. 1602 – 1645) was an English poet, Doctor of Divinity and Public Orator of Oxford University, one of the Worthies of Devon of John Prince (d.1723).

== Origins ==
He was born in Devon and baptised on 11 January 1602/3 (probably at the age of one) at Shaugh Prior, about 4 miles north of Newnham, the ancient seat of the Strode family. He was the only son of Philip Strode (d.1605) by his wife Wilmot Hoghton, daughter of William Hoghton (alias Houghton) of Hoghton Tower, Lancaster. Philip Strode was the 4th son of William III Strode (1512–1579) of Newnham, Plympton St Mary, Devon, by his wife Elizabeth Courtenay, daughter and heiress of Philip Courtenay of Loughtor, a younger son of Sir Philip Courtenay (d.1488) of Molland in North Devon.

== Education ==
He was educated at Westminster School and Christ Church, Oxford. He began writing English and Latin verse at an early age; his first published work was a Latin poem in the collection Annae Funebria Sacra (1619). He remained at Christ Church for the rest of his life, taking his B.A. in 1621 and his M.A. three years later.

== Career ==
It is not known when he took deacon's orders, but in 1628 he was ordained priest, and gained a reputation as a preacher; he also became chaplain to his friend Bishop Corbett, formerly been dean of Christ Church. When Corbett was translated from Oxford to the see of Norwich in 1632, they continued friends; Strode preached at an episcopal visitation in Norfolk the following year, and produced a Latin version of the bishop's epitaph on his mother for use on her monument. In 1629 he was made public orator of the university, a post he held till his death; he was also made proctor for 1629 under the newly introduced rotational system.

When in 1635 Charles I visited Woodstock Palace, near Oxford, Strode in his capacity of orator made a speech in the king's honour; as a result he was promised the next Christ Church canonry not linked to a specific chair that should fall vacant. The discovery of an autograph copy of the oration in the National Archives, Kew, was announced in an Oxford doctoral thesis in 2017. In 1636 the king returned, this time on a visit to the university, and on his arrival was again welcomed by the orator. Strode also wrote one of three plays performed before the king and court on that occasion, which was described by a member of the audience as the worst play he had ever seen except for one at Cambridge. Strode had no experience as a dramatist, but had been commissioned by Archbishop Laud, chancellor of the university, to write an attack on Puritanism which vilified Burton, Bastwick, and Prynne, whom Laud was planning to arrest. The vitriolic tone of the attack was unusual for Strode, who was not only a tolerant and fair-minded man, but also in regular contact with his strongly Puritan family in Devon (his namesake the Parliamentarian was one of his cousins). However, 'The Townes new Teacher', written about this time, shows his new hostility to a movement whose narrow-minded intolerance he was finding increasingly disturbing: the poem has been called the best example of anti-Puritan satire.

In 1638 he obtained the promised canonry, and the first of several benefices in the gift of the dean and chapter; he also became Doctor of Divinity. The canonry gave him at last the right to marry, though he did not do so till July 1642, when he married into a family with his own royalist and Laudian views. His wife Mary was the daughter of Doctor John Simpson, Prebend of Canterbury; the Simpsons were connected by marriage to Bishop Skinner, one of several bishops impeached and imprisoned in 1641. By this time the political situation had become difficult; Laud had been arrested and impeached, and Strode was called to account before a Parliamentary Committee for the adulatory expressions he had applied to the Archbishop, though he was dismissed without any penalty. Nevertheless, the terms in which he had addressed Laud were produced in Laud's trial as 'proof' that the Archbishop had assumed papal power.

The outbreak of war in August 1642 found Strode deeply divided from his family. It is unsurprising to find many of his Devon relations fighting against the king: they were related to Thomas Bamfylde (later to be Speaker in Richard Cromwell's Parliament) and by marriage to John Pym, and were known as 'notoriously disaffected', according to Clarendon. While his cousins – or their husbands – were on the battlefield, Strode remained in Oxford carrying out his normal duties, though when the King made the city his headquarters and Christ Church his residence, life must have become difficult. Two sermons he preached before the King at that time were published by royal command. Apart from the birth of his daughter Jane in 1643, little more is known about his life in the final years. That he left no will suggests his death came suddenly and unexpectedly; he died in Oxford on 10 March 1645 and was buried in the Divinity Chapel of Christ Church Cathedral there. The widow moved to Bedfordshire, but Strode's papers seem to have remained in Oxford, where eventually some came into the possession of Richard Davis, the famous Oxford bookseller. The holograph owned by William Fulman was left by him to his college, and is now known as Corpus Christi College MS 325. The fate of the fair copy is unknown.

Although he was one of the most popular poets of his time – according to Beal, Strode's 'I saw faire Cloris walke alone' was probably the most popular poem of the century – his poetical works remained uncollected until Bertram Dobell published an edition in 1907; this, being based on unreliable manuscripts, was inaccurate and incomplete and has been generally ignored by scholars. In 1953 a heavily corrected manuscript temporarily deposited in the Bodleian Library by Corpus Christi College, Oxford, was recognised by a librarian as a Strode holograph; she was also able to demonstrate that insertions in the manuscript by a later owner, the antiquarian William Fulman, relate to another Strode manuscript now lost. This manuscript was a fair copy of the English poems, apparently prepared with publication in mind. The discovery of the holograph made possible the preparation of a new edition by Margaret Forey, which was submitted as an Oxford B.Litt. thesis in 1966. Although this edition remains unpublished, it was used by Peter Beal as the basis of the canon accepted in his Index of English Literary Manuscripts (which lists over 1250 manuscript entries of a Strode poem). Subsequent published work on Strode has revealed him to be the author also of a popular poem long considered one of Carew's most perfect lyrics.

Strode's love poetry and elegies are typical of their age, but he also wrote comical and satirical verse; there is evidence that his ballads set to popular tunes were actually sung. In addition to lyrical charm, he possessed an attractive sense of humour. Some poems are based on Oxford events of his day; others vividly portray details of everyday seventeenth century life. The variety of his poetry is demonstrated by the fact that some of his poems have been assumed to be by Carew, while others have been attributed to a very different writer, Richard Corbett.

== Sources used ==
- Strode, William,'Sermon concerning Death and the Resurrection', 1644
- Strode, William,'Sermon concerning swearing',1644
- Strode, William, 'The Floating Island', 1655
- Strode, William, 'Sermon at a Visitation held at Lin, Norfolk, 24 June 1633', 1660
- The Poetical Works of William Strode', edited by Bertram Dobell (1907)
- M.C.Crum, "William Fulman and an Autograph Manuscript of the Poet Strode", 'The Bodleian Library Record, Vol.4, No.6, December 1953
- M.Forey, 'A Critical Edition of the Poetical Works of William Strode, excluding "The Floating Island", Oxford University B.Litt. thesis 1966
- M.Forey, "Manuscript Evidence and the Author of 'Aske me no more':William Strode, not Thomas Carew", 'English Manuscript Studies 1100–1700', ed. Peter Beal and A.S.G.Edwards, 2005
- Adam Smyth, '"Art Reflexive": The Poetry, Sermons, and Drama of William Strode (1601?–645)', 'Studies in Philology', Vol.103, No.4, Fall 2006
- M.Forey, "William Strode's 'The Floating Island': Play and Political Propaganda", 'The Seventeenth Century', Vol.27, No.2, Summer 2012
- Callum Seddon, 'Witness William Strode': Manuscript Contexts, Circulation and Reception', University of Oxford D.Phil. thesis, 2017

== Further source ==
- Prince, John, (1643–1723) The Worthies of Devon, 1810 edition, pp. 730–735, biography of Strode, William, Doctor of Divinity
