= William Strode =

English politician

William Strode MP
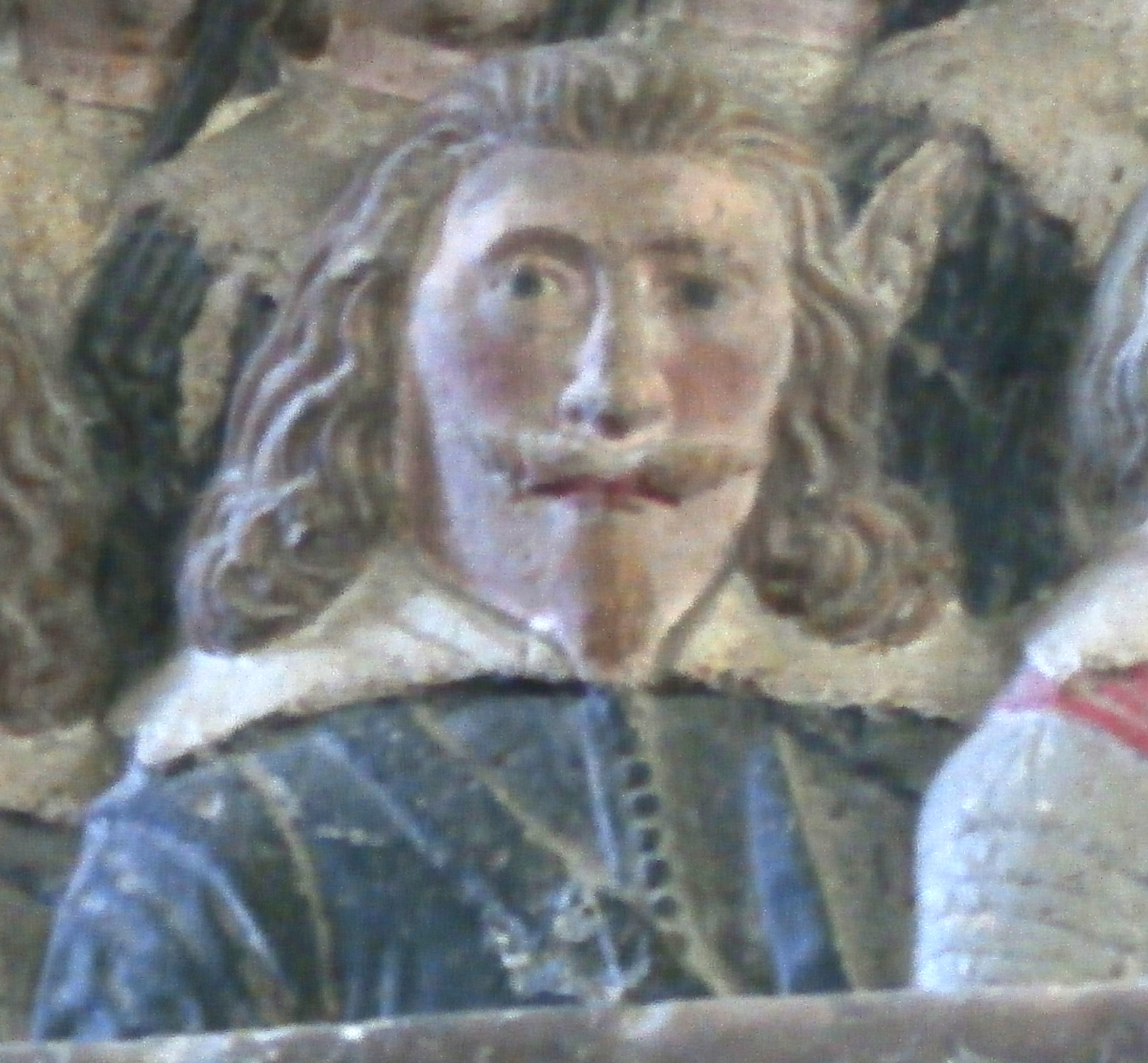
- Relief sculpture of Strode

Member of Parliament for Bere Alston
- In office April 1640 – 1641
- Preceded by: Parliament reestablished
- Succeeded by: Francis Drake
- In office June 1625 – 1629
- Preceded by: Thomas Cheek
- Succeeded by: Parliament dissolved

Personal details
- Born: Before 6 November 1594
- Died: 9 September 1645 (aged 50)
- Education: Exeter College, Oxford

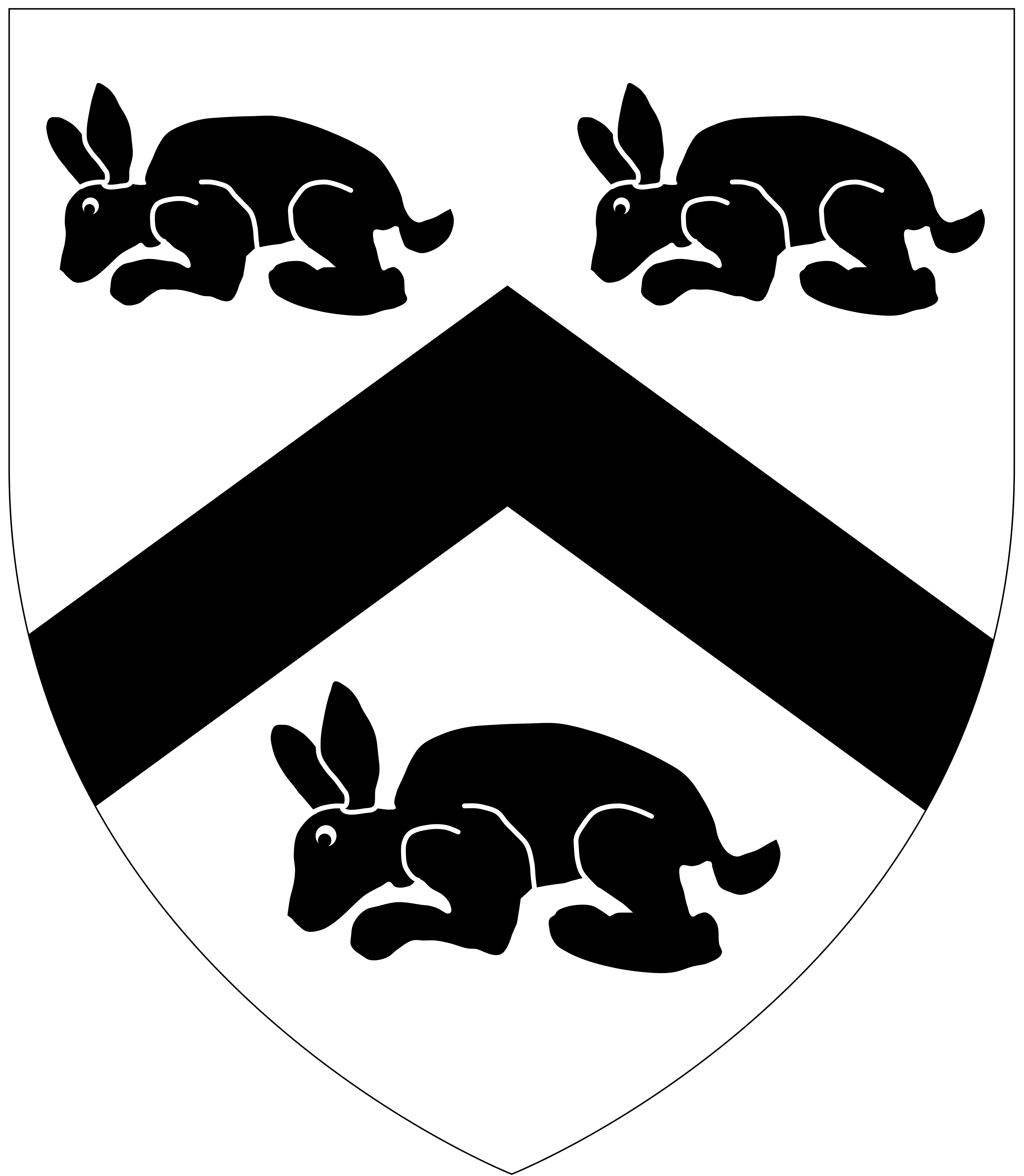
Arms of Strode: Argent, a chevron between three conies courant sable

William Strode (before 6 November 1594 – 9 September 1645) was an English politician who sat in the House of Commons variously between 1624 and 1645. He was one of the Five Members whose impeachment and attempted unconstitutional arrest by King Charles I in the House of Commons in 1642 sparked the Civil War, during which he fought on the Parliamentarian side.

== Origins ==
Strode was the second son of Sir William Strode (d. 1637), MP, of Newnham, Plympton St Mary, Devon, by his first wife Mary Southcote, daughter of Thomas Southcote of Bovey Tracey in Devon.

== Education ==
He was admitted as a student of the Inner Temple in 1614, matriculated at Exeter College, Oxford, in 1617, and took the degree of BA in 1619.

== Career ==
In 1624, Strode was elected Member of Parliament for Bere Alston, and was re-elected MP for Bere Alston in 1625, 1626 and 1628. He opposed Charles I from the start, and took a leading part in the disorderly scene of 2 March 1629, when the speaker, Sir John Finch, was held down in the chair after refusing to put the resolution of Sir John Eliot against arbitrary taxation and innovations in religion (see Denzil Holles). Strode was prosecuted before the star chamber, but refused "to answer anything done in the House of Parliament but in that House." On 7 May a fresh warrant was issued, and a month later, to prevent his release on bail, he was sent by Charles with two of his fellow members to the Tower. Refusing to give a bond for his good behaviour, he was sentenced to imprisonment during the king's pleasure, and was kept in confinement in various prisons for eleven years. During those eleven years, King Charles ruled without parliament.

In January 1640, in accordance with the king's new policy of moderation, Strode was released and on 13 April took his seat as MP for Bere Alston in the Short Parliament. He was re-elected for the Long Parliament, which met on 3 November 1640. He was the first to propose parliamentary control over ministerial appointments, the militia, and its own duration, He supported the Grand Remonstrance of 7 November 1641. He zealously pursued the prosecution of Strafford, and actually proposed that all who appeared as the prisoner's counsel should be charged as conspirators in the same treason. As a result, he was included among the Five Members impeached by Charles of high treason on 3 January 1642.

Strode opposed all suggestions of compromise with Charles and urged on the preparations for war. He was present at the Battle of Edgehill on 23 October 1642. He was as relentless in the prosecution of Laud as he had been in that of Strafford. It was he who carried up the message from the Commons to the Lords on 28 November 1644 which desired them to hasten on the ordinance for the archbishop's execution. Strode did not long survive his victim. He is mentioned as having been elected a member of the Westminster Assembly on 31 January 1645. He died on 9 September the same year, and by order of parliament was accorded a public funeral in Westminster Abbey. The body was exhumed after the Restoration and thrown into a pit in the churchyard of St Margaret's, Westminster, with about twenty other rebels.

== Identification ==
The identity of the W. Strode imprisoned in 1628 and of the W. Strode impeached in 1642 has been questioned, but is now established. On the other hand, he is to be distinguished from Colonel William Strode of Barrington, also parliamentarian and Member of Parliament, who died in 1666; and from William Strode (1602–1645), the orator, poet and dramatist.

== Notes ==
Parliament of England
Preceded by Thomas Jermyn; Sir Thomas Cheek	Member of Parliament for Bere Alston; 1624–1629; With: Thomas Jermyn 1624; Sir Thomas Cheek 1625; Thomas Wise 1626–1628	Parliament suspended until 1640
Vacant Parliament suspended since 1629	Member of Parliament for Bere Alston; 1640–1645; With: John Harris 1640; Sir Thomas Cheek 1640; Hugh Pollard; Charles Pym	Succeeded by Sir Francis Drake, 2nd Baronet; Charles Pym
