= Five Members =

MPs that Charles I attempted to arrest in 1642

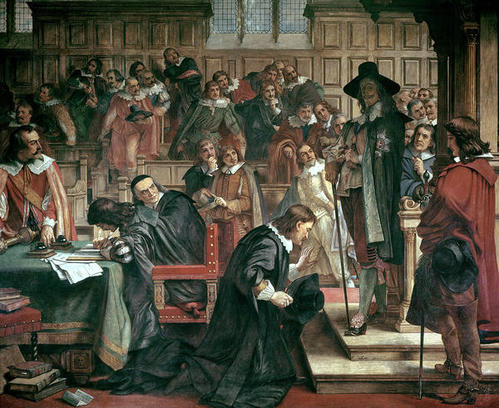
Lenthall kneels to Charles during the attempted arrest of the Five Members. Victorian painting by Charles West Cope

The Five Members were Members of Parliament whom King Charles I attempted to arrest on 4 January 1642. King Charles I entered the English House of Commons, accompanied by armed soldiers, during a sitting of the Long Parliament, although the Five Members were no longer in the House at the time. The Five Members were:

- John Hampden (c. 1594–1643), member for Buckinghamshire
- Arthur Haselrig (1601–1661), member for Leicestershire
- Denzil Holles (1599–1680), member for Dorchester
- John Pym (1584–1643), member for Tavistock
- William Strode (1598–1645), member for Bere Alston

Charles' attempt to coerce Parliament by force failed, turned many against him, and was one of the events leading directly to the outbreak of civil war later in 1642.

== Background ==
The relationship between the House of Commons and Charles I of England had become increasingly fraught during 1641. The king believed that Puritans, encouraged by five vociferous Members of the House of Commons – John Pym, John Hampden, Denzil Holles, Arthur Haselrig and William Strode, together with the peer Edward Montagu, Viscount Mandeville (the future Earl of Manchester) – had encouraged the Scots to invade England in the recent Bishops' Wars, and that they were intent on turning the people against him. When rumours reached the court that they were also planning to impeach the queen, Henrietta Maria of France, for alleged involvement in Catholic plots, Charles made accusations of treason against them in the House of Lords. The Commons met to consider the allegations on 3 January 1642, and held them to be a breach of the House's privilege.

== The attempted arrest ==
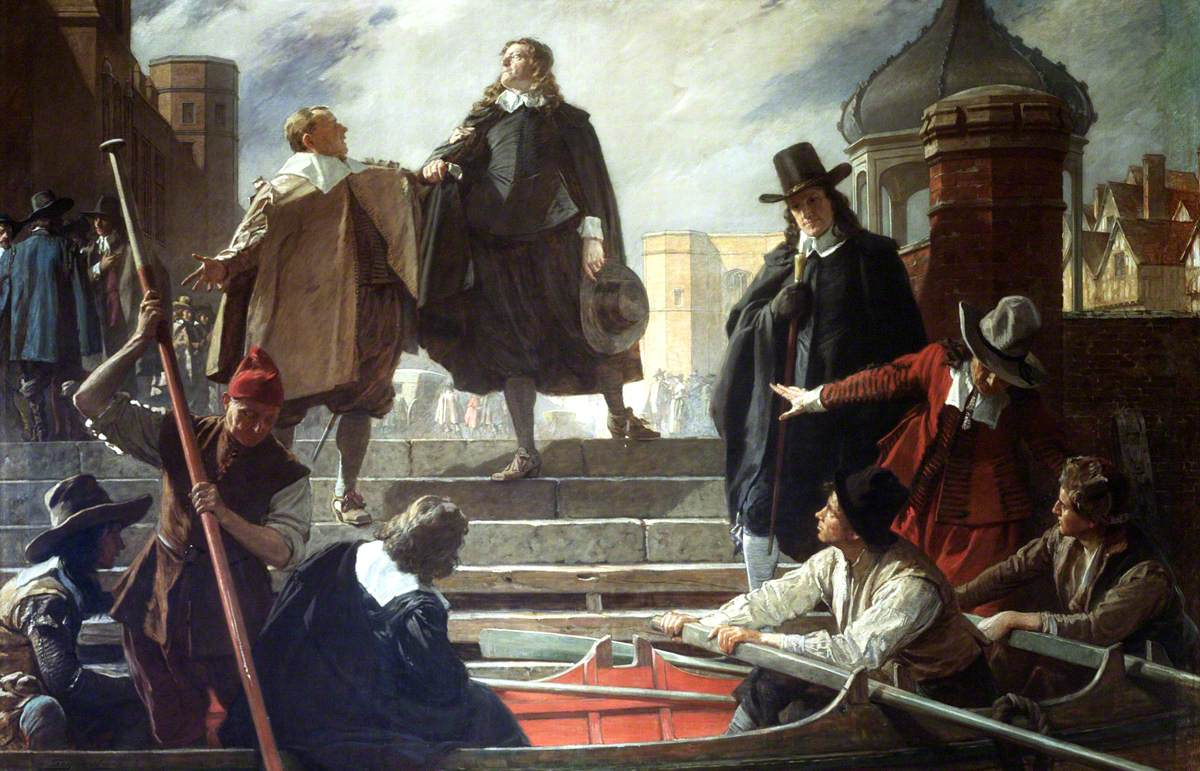
The Flight of the Five Members, 1642, showing the Five Members fleeing Westminster by boat to the City. (John Seymour Lucas, 1915)

Without agreement from the Commons, Charles faced difficulties in having the Five Members taken into custody. He had been considering decisive action for some time, but became hesitant. Both the queen and Lord Digby advised him to go down to the Commons with an armed guard, and to make the arrest in person. It was alleged that the queen exclaimed, "Go you poltroon. Go and pull those rogues out by the ears, or never see my face again"; the king yielded. To ensure there would be no armed resistance, he first sent a message to the Lord Mayor of London forbidding him from sending men to protect Parliament. Then, on 4 January 1642, he set off for the House, accompanied by around four hundred armed men.

The Five Members, who had been expecting the king to strike, took their seats as usual that morning. At about three o'clock, they received word via the French ambassador, Jacques d'Étampes, that Charles was on his way, and they left the House and took a waiting barge to the City of London.

Charles entered the precincts of the House with about eighty men, armed with pistols and swords. They remained in the lobby while Charles entered the Commons chamber accompanied only by his nephew, the Elector Palatine. Roxburghe, one of Charles' retainers, propped the doors open so that the members in the chamber could see the troops making play with their pistols.

Charles removed his hat and walked to the front, saluting some members as he passed. The members stood in silence. Addressing Speaker of the House William Lenthall, he said "Mr Speaker, I must for a time make bold with your chair". Lenthall vacated it. Calling first for one of the members, and then another, he was met with total silence. He asked the speaker where they were. Kneeling, Lenthall responded:

May it please your majesty, I have neither eyes to see nor tongue to speak in this place but as this House is pleased to direct me whose servant I am here; and I humbly beg your majesty's pardon that I cannot give any other answer than this to what your majesty is pleased to demand of me.

This was the first time that a speaker had declared his allegiance to the liberty of Parliament rather than the will of the monarch.

The king responded: "'Tis no matter, I think my eyes are as good as another's." He studied the benches for 'a pretty while' then lamented "all my birds have flown". He left the chair and walked out "in a more discontented and angry passion than he came in", followed by shouts of "Privilege! Privilege!" from the members.

== London in uproar ==
The king issued a proclamation ordering the City of London to surrender the fugitives, and marched in person to the Guildhall to demand that City officers hand them over. However, the City officers declared their support for Parliament, as did the regiments of the Inns of Court.

Returning to Whitehall in his coach, the King drove through a London that was in uproar. Rumours spread that the king's supporters were going to attack the City, and volunteers poured in to offer their services in its defence. Barricades were erected, cannon dragged out, and there were soon six thousand citizens ready to repulse any attack. To many at the time, Charles's act had appeared tyrannical.

== Aftermath ==
On 10 January, Charles suddenly left London for Hampton Court, fearing both for his own life and that of the queen. He was not to return for seven years – and then only for his own trial and execution.

The next day the Five Members came out of their hiding place in the City, and travelled by barge back to Parliament accompanied by a regatta of decorated craft, and cheering citizens. The king had lost the support of the people of London.

On 17 January, the House of Commons issued a lengthy public declaration denouncing Charles' intrusion as "a high breach of the rights and privileges of Parliament, and inconsistent with the liberties and freedoms thereof." It declared the king's order to the City to seize the Five Members to have no basis in law, and announced that any person doing so would be guilty of breach of privilege of Parliament and deemed a public enemy of the Commonwealth. Any person harbouring the five, on the other hand, should have parliamentary protection.

Parliament had already pressed the king to approve a Militia Bill, effectively transferring control of the army from king to Parliament, and Charles once again refused, protesting "By God! Not for an hour! You have asked that of me which was never asked of any king." By March 1642, Parliament issued the bill on its own authority as the Militia Ordinance, pushing the country towards civil war.

== Commemoration ==
Charles' 1642 incursion into the Commons chamber is now commemorated annually at the State Opening of Parliament, an event which formally marks the beginning of each parliamentary session.

The monarch takes the throne in the House of Lords and sends their messenger, Black Rod, to summon the members of the House of Commons to attend. At Black Rod's approach, the doors to the chamber are slammed in the messenger's face, symbolising the rights and independence of the Commons. Black Rod bangs forcefully three times with the end of the ceremonial staff on the closed doors, which are then opened. Black Rod's presence is announced. Black Rod then enters and conveys the monarch's command that "this honourable House... attend upon His [Her] Majesty immediately in the House of Peers."

== Depiction in film ==
A version of the attempted arrest of the Five Members is depicted in the 1970 film Cromwell. However it inaccurately replaces Holles and Strode with Oliver Cromwell and Henry Ireton.

== Bibliography ==
- Field, John (2011). The Story of Parliament in the Palace of Westminster (2nd ed.). London: James & James. ISBN 9780907383871.
- Woolrych, Austin (2002). Britain in Revolution. Oxford University Press. ISBN 0-19-927268-9.
- Hibbert, Christopher (1993). Cavaliers and Roundheads: The English at War 1642-1649. HarperCollins. ISBN 0-246-13632-4.
- Wedgwood, CV (1958). The King's War 1641-1647. Wm Collins & Sons. Page numbers based on the 1974 reprint by Book Club Associates.
- Davies, Godfrey (1959). The Early Stuarts 1603-1660. The Oxford History of England (2nd ed.). Oxford University Press. ISBN 0-19-821704-8.
