= Todd Gray (historian) =

Todd Gray FRHistS, MBE (born 1958) is a historian of the county of Devon, England.

Gray was born and raised in New England, USA and first visited Devon on a school trip in 1973. He undertook a degree in London and then started studying for a PhD at the University of Exeter in 1984. He completed his doctorate in 1988 and has since then been a research fellow at the university. In 1992 he became a Fellow of the Royal Historical Society.

Gray became a British citizen in 2006 and in 2014 he was awarded an MBE for voluntary services to Devon's history. He has been involved on the committees of many local organisations including Devon & Cornwall Notes & Queries (committee), the Devonshire Association (chairman and president), Devon History Society (committee), The Devon and Cornwall Record Society (chairman), Devon Gardens Trust, Devon Family History Society (president), the Centre for South-Western Historical Studies and the Friends of Devon's Archives (chairman).

In 2006, based on a 16th-century document, Gray claimed that the Cornish pasty was in fact invented in Devon as early as 1460 which not only caused consternation in Cornwall, but was remarked upon as far away as China.

As of 2018 Gray had published 48 books, 14 of which are about Exeter. Many of the books have been published through his own company, Mint Press. In November 2018 he was awarded the Honorary Freedom of the City of Exeter at a ceremony in the city's Guildhall.

== List of works ==
- Early Stuart Mariners and Shipping: The Maritime Surveys of Devon and Cornwall 1619-35 (editor, 1990)
- Tudor and Stuart Devon: The Common Estate and Government (co-editor, 1992)
- Harvest Failure in Cornwall and Devon: The Book of Orders and the Corn Surveys of 1623 and 1630-31 (editor, 1992)
- The Garden History of Devon: An Illustrated Guide to Sources (editor, 1995)
- Devon Household Accounts, 1627-59: Part I (editor, 1995)
- Devon Household Accounts, 1627-59: Part II (editor, 1996)
- Devon Documents in Honour of Mrs Margery Rowe (editor, 1996)
- Travels in Georgian Devon: The Illustrated Journals of the Reverend John Swete, 1789-1800 in 4 vols. (editor, 1997-2000)
- The Lost Chronicle of Barnstaple, 1586-1611 (1998)
- Christmas in Devon (2000)
- Exeter: The Travellers' Tales (editor, 2000)
- East Devon: The Travellers' Tales (editor, 2000)
- Cornwall: The Travellers' Tales (editor, 2000)
- The Devon Almanac (2000)
- Exeter Engraved. Volume One: The Secular City (2000)
- Exeter Engraved. Volume Two: The Cathedral, Churches, Chapels and Priories (2001)
- Dartmoor Engraved (2001)
- Victorian Stories Round a Dartmoor Hearth (2001)
- Elizabethan Devon (2001)
- The Curious Sexual Adventure of the Reverend John Prince (2001)
- Victorian News from Totnes (2001)
- Victorian Wild Flowers of Devon (2001)
- The Victorian Under Class of Exeter (2001)
- Devon Country Houses and Gardens Engraved. Volume One: A-La-Ronde to Lifton Park (2001)
- Lost Exeter: Five Centuries of Change (2002)
- Lost Devon: Creation, Change and Destruction Over 500 Years (2003)
- Exeter Unveiled (2003)
- The Essence of Exeter (2004)
- Exeter in the 1940s (2004)
- Exeter Remembers the War: Life on the Home Front (2005)
- The Chronicle of Exeter 1205-1722 (2005)
- Exeter Maps (2006)
- Blackshirts in Devon (2006)
- Exeter News Photographs in the 1940s (2007)
- Devon and the Slave Trade: Documents on African Enslavement, Abolition and Emancipation from 1562 to 1867 (2007)
- Remarkable Women of Devon (2009)
- Looting in Wartime Britain: History that Hurts (2009)
- Lest Devon Forgets: Service, Sacrifice and the Creation of Great War Memorials (2010)
- Devon's Fifty Best Churches (2011)
- Devon's Ancient Bench Ends (2012)
- The Art of the Devon Garden: The Depiction of Plants and Ornamental Landscapes from the Year 1200 (2013)
- How to Swear Like an Elizabethan in Devon (2016)
- Strumpets and Ninnycocks: Name Calling in Devon, 1540-1640 (2016)
- A Gazeteer of Ancient Bench Ends in Cornwall's Parish Churches (2016)
- Devon Parish Taxpayers, 1500-1650. Volume One (2016)
- Devon Parish Taxpayers, 1500-1650. Volume Two (2016)
- Devon Parish Taxpayers, 1500-1650. Volume Three (2016)
- St. Martin's Island: An Introductory History of Forty Two Exeter Buildings (2017)
- Not One of Us: Individuals Set Apart by Choice, Circumstances, Crowds or the Mob in Exeter, 1451-1952 (2018)
- William Birchynshaw's Map of Exeter, 1743 (co-editor, 2019)
- Uncle Tom Cobley and All (2019)
- Devon's Last Slave-Owners (2021)
- The Exeter Cloth Dispatch Book 1763-1765 (editor, 2021)
- Queen Elizabeth II in Exeter (2022)
- Exeter's Lost Buildings: Destruction from 1800 to 1899 (2023)
- Voices of Empire in Exeter, 1575-1996. Part One (2024)
- Voices of Empire in Exeter, 1575-1996. Part Two (2024)
- Devon's Home Front Diaries 1937-1945 (2025)
