= Slanning =

Slanning is a surname. Notable people with the surname include:

- Nicholas Slanning (1606–1643), English soldier
- Slanning baronets
- Sir Nicholas Slanning, 1st Baronet
