= William Strode (1614–1676) =

English politician (1614–1676)

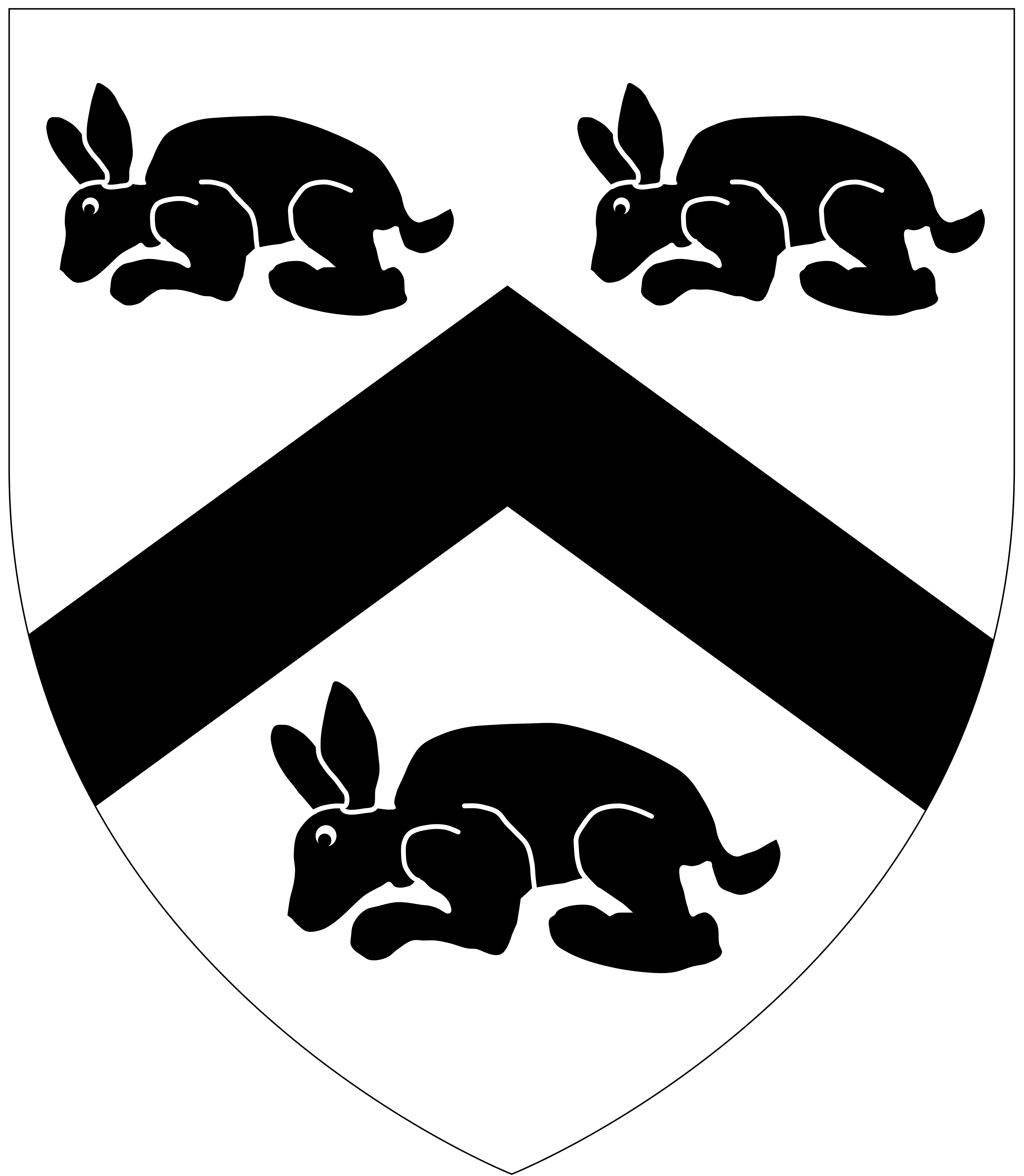
Arms of Strode: Argent, a chevron between three conies courant sable. Detail from mural monument to Sir William IV Strode (1562-1637) in St Mary's Church, Plympton

Sir William Strode (1614 – 13 January 1676) of Newnham, Plympton St Mary, Devon, was a member of the Devonshire gentry and twice served as MP for his family's pocket borough of Plympton Erle, in 1660 and 1661–1676.

== Origins ==
Strode was the eldest son of Sir Richard Strode (d. 1669) of Newnham, Plympton St Mary, Devon and Chalmington, Dorset by his second wife Elizabeth Erle, daughter of Thomas Erle of Charborough, Dorset. He was baptised on 18 December 1614.

== Career ==
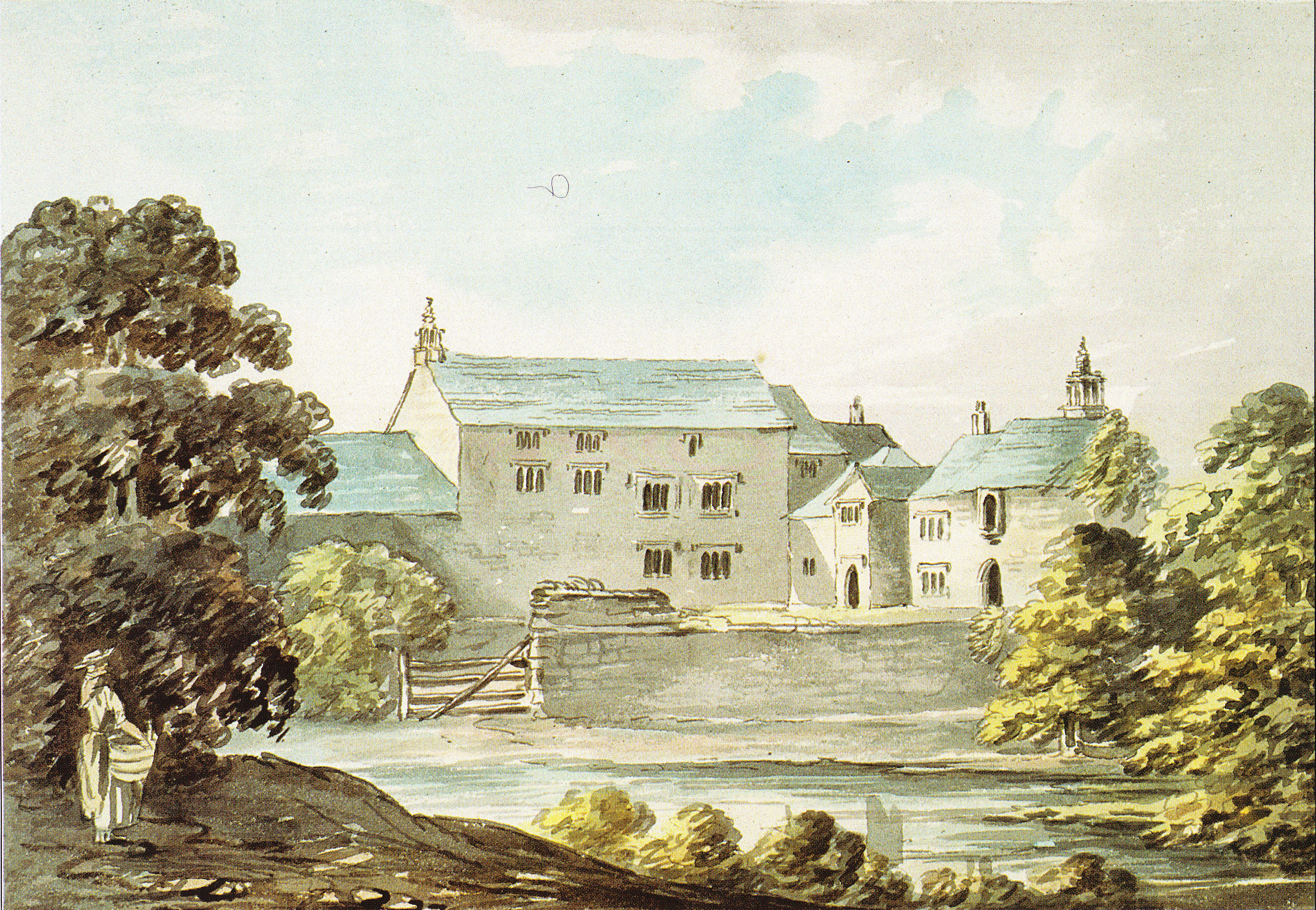
Old Newnham House, Devon. Painted in 1797

He entered Middle Temple in 1632. During the Civil War he kept out of the conflict and in 1644 he went abroad. He was on very bad terms with his father but in about 1654 his father had to make over the estate at Newnham to him.

In April 1660, Strode was elected Member of Parliament for Plympton Erle for the Convention Parliament. He became JP for Devon in July 1660 and became a commissioner for assessment in August 1660. He took little part in parliament but on 6 November 1660 he proposed a message of congratulation to the Queen Mother when she returned from France. He was knighted on 5 December 1660.

In 1661 Strode was re-elected MP for Plympton Erle for the Cavalier Parliament and sat until his death in 1676. He was a commissioner for corporations from 1662 to 1663 and was recorder of Plympton Erle from around 1663 until his death. He was a commissioner for recusants for Devon in 1675.

== Marriages and children ==
Strode married twice:

- Firstly on 25 November 1636 to Anne Button, daughter of Sir William Button of Parkgate, Tawstock, Devon, by whom he had a son and three daughters including:
  - Richard Strode (1638–1707), MP for Plympton Erle. He died unmarried. Together with his near neighbour Sir George Treby (d. 1700) of Plympton House, Lord Chief Justice of the Common Pleas, also an MP for Plympton Erle, he financed the building of Plympton Guildhall which he gave to the Borough of Plympton.
  - Elizabeth Strode (b. 1641), wife of Joseph Maynard (1639–1689), MP.
- Secondly on 19 October 1647 he married Blanche Kekewich (d. 1665), daughter of William Kekewich of Catchfrench, Cornwall by whom he had seven sons and one daughter, including:
  - William Strode (d. 1718), 2nd son, inherited Newnham from his elder half-brother Richard Strode (1638–1707). He died without children.
  - Francis Strode (1654–1675), 3rd son
  - Sidney I Strode (1655–1712), 4th son, married a certain Thomasine by whom he had an eldest son and heir Sidney II Strode (1684–1721), of Newnham, who inherited from his uncle William Strode (d. 1718) the ancient Strode seat of Newnham and built for himself a new seat nearby on the estate at Loughtor, which he named "Newnham Park".
  - John Strode (1662–1663), 5th son, died an infant
  - Charles Strode, 6th son, married a certain Mary and had a daughter Jane Strode (born 1679)
  - Jane Strode (1657–1658), died an infant

== Death and burial ==
He died at the age of 61 and was buried at Plympton St Mary.

Parliament of England
| Vacant Not represented in the restored Rump Title last held by Christopher Martyn; Henry Hatsell | Member of Parliament for Plympton Erle; 1660–1677; With: Christopher Martyn 1660; Thomas Hele; Sir Edmund Fortescue, 1st Baronet; Sir Nicholas Slanning, 1st Baronet | Succeeded by Sir Nicholas Slanning, 1st Baronet; Sir George Treby |
