= Michael Oldisworth =

English politician

- Born: 1591
- Died: 1664 (aged 72–73)
- Education: Magdalen College, Oxford
- Occupation: politician
- Years active: 1624–1629, 1640–1650
- Known for: Member of Parliament
- Notable work: supported Parliamentary side in the English Civil War
- Spouse: Jane Thomas
- Parents: Arnold Oldsworth (father); Lucy Barty (mother)

Michael Oldisworth (1591–1664) was an English politician who sat in the House of Commons variously between 1624 and 1653. He supported the Parliamentary side in the English Civil War.

Oldisworth was the son of Arnold Oldsworth and his wife Lucy Barty daughter of Francis Barty of Antwerp. He was a fellow of Magdalen College, Oxford, and became secretary to the 3rd and 4th Earls of Pembroke. He entered parliament in the interest of the Earls.

In 1624 Oldisworth became Member of Parliament for Old Sarum after Sir Arthur Ingram chose to sit for York instead. He was re-elected MP for Old Sarum in 1625, 1626 and 1628 and sat until 1629 when King Charles decided to rule without parliament for eleven years.

In April 1640, Oldisworth was elected MP for Salisbury in the Short Parliament. In November 1640 he was returned as MP for Salisbury and Plympton Erle and chose to sit for Salisbury. His patron was a puritan and had broken with the King, and Oldisworth continued to support the parliamentarian cause. He was appointed keeper of Windsor Great Park in 1650 and master of the prerogative office. He was satirised by royalist pamphleteers and praised by Herrick.

Oldisworth married Jane Thomas, widow of William Thomas and daughter of Sir John Stradling, 1st Baronet.

Parliament of England
| Preceded by Sir Robert Cotton, 1st Baronet, of Connington; Sir Arthur Ingram | Member of Parliament for Old Sarum; 1628–1629; With: Sir Robert Cotton, 1st Baronet, of Connington 1624; Sir John Stradling 1625; Sir Benjamin Rudyerd 1626; Christopher Keightley 1628–1629 | Parliament suspended until 1640 |
| Vacant Parliament suspended since 1629 | Member of Parliament for Salisbury; 1640–1653; With: Robert Hyde; John Dove | Not represented in Barebones Parliament |
| Preceded by Sir Nicholas Slanning; Sir Thomas Hele, 1st Baronet | Member of Parliament for Plympton Erle; 1640; With: Sir Nicholas Slanning | Succeeded by Hugh Potter; Sir Richard Strode |
