= Nicholas Slanning (disambiguation) =

Nicholas Slanning was an English soldier.

Nicholas Slanning may also refer to:

- Sir Nicholas Slanning, 1st Baronet (1643–1691)
- Nicholas Slanning (died 1583), MP for Plymouth
