= Thomas Alderne =

English merchant

Thomas Alderne (d. 1660) was a London merchant involved in the overseas trade. He lived in Hackney, Middlesex.

Alderne was a puritan and part of the gathered congregation of John Goodwin.

He became a victualler for the Royal Navy working with other London merchants to supply Admiral Robert Blake's fleet following the Battle of the Gabbard in 1653.

Alderne had a business arrangement with Martin Noell and Henry Hatsell, of Plymouth, in the transportation of Royalist prisoners involved in the Penruddock uprising. They were shipped to Barbados, where they were sold goods and chattels for fifteen hundred and fifty pounds of sugar each on 7 May 1656. Later in July of that year he was appointed to a Committee for managing affairs in Jamaica and the West Indies set up by the English Council of State, alongside Noell, Thomas Povey, Tobias Bridge and others.
