= Penruddock uprising =

1655 Royalist uprising in England

Penruddock Uprising
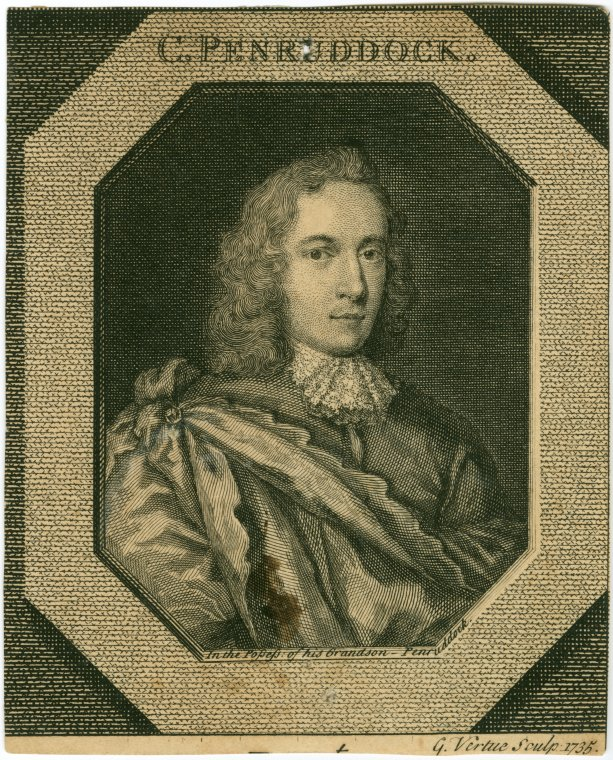
- Colonel John Penruddock
Date	11 to 14 March 1655
Location	West Country
Result	Government victory

Belligerents
Commonwealth of England	Royalists

Commanders and leaders
Captain Unton Croke	Colonel John Penruddock; Sir Joseph Wagstaffe

Strength
60	300 to 400

Casualties and losses
8 wounded	Minimal

The Penruddock Uprising was a Royalist revolt launched on 11 March 1655, intending to restore Charles II to the throne of England. It was led by John Penruddock, a Wiltshire landowner who fought for Charles I in the First English Civil War; intended as one of a number of co-ordinated risings, the others failed to take place and it was easily suppressed.

Often described as planned by the Sealed Knot, a small group of senior Royalist conspirators, the organisers actually belonged to a loose network sometimes referred to as the 'Action Party'. They counted on support from Presbyterian opponents of the Protectorate, disillusioned Leveller radicals and disaffected elements within the New Model Army, including its former commander Thomas Fairfax. These hopes proved unfounded, while the Protectorate was aware of the preparations well in advance.

A series of uprisings was planned throughout England on 8 March, most of which failed to take place. Three days later, Penruddock and Joseph Wagstaffe attacked Salisbury but without support elsewhere retreated into North Devon. On 14 March, a troop of New Model cavalry under Captain Unton Croke attacked the rebels in South Molton, and they quickly surrendered.

Despite its failure, the Rising demonstrated the lack of support for the Protectorate and its reliance on the army. Although Penruddock and 11 others were executed, the majority received minimal punishment, while senior legal officers argued they were not guilty of treason, since it only applied to acts against the king. Shortly after Cromwell instituted the Rule of the Major-Generals, which dramatically increased the unpopularity of the regime.

== Background ==
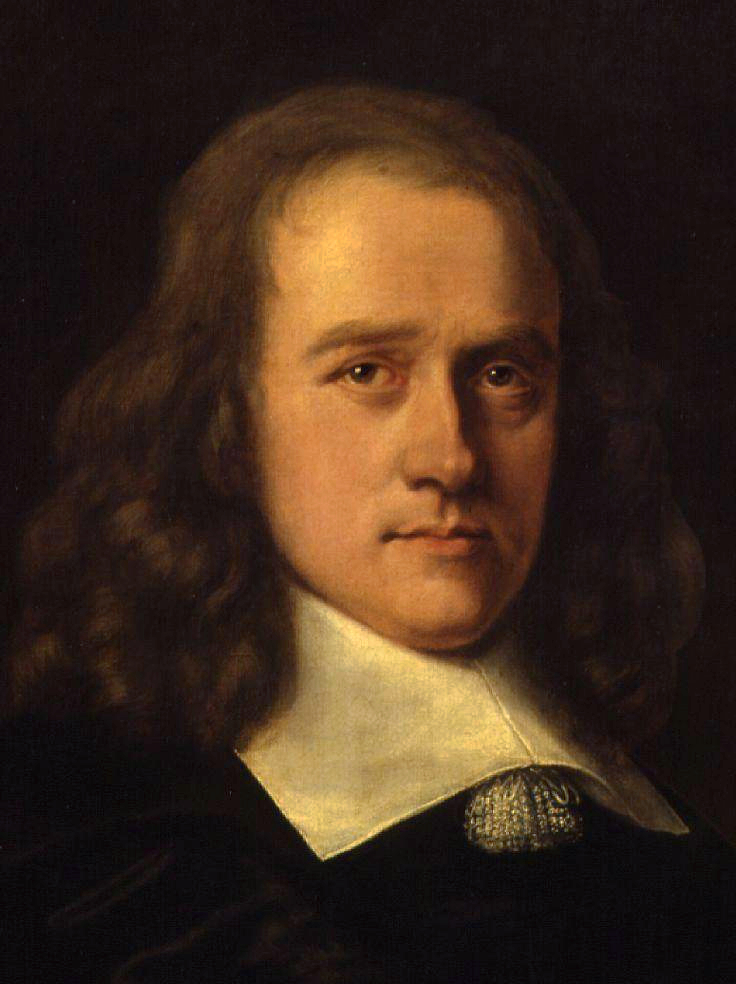
John Thurloe; Cromwell's spymaster who was aware of the proposed uprising several months before

In 1654, plans were made for an English revolt to coincide with Glencairn's rising in Scotland, but an attempt to assassinate Cromwell known as Gerard's conspiracy was a disastrous failure. As a result, a small group of aristocrats known as the Sealed Knot were given responsible for co-ordinating future Royalist activity in England, reporting to senior exiles Edward Hyde and the Earl of Ormond. One of its members, Sir Richard Willis, was later revealed to be a double agent working for Cromwell's spymaster, John Thurloe. Its effectiveness was further undermined by a long-standing personal dispute between Willis and Lord John Belasyse, another of its leaders.

Frustrated by the lack of action, a second group known as the 'Action Party' was established, which consisted of middle-ranking country gentlemen and Royalist veterans of the First English Civil War like Sir Humphrey Bennet and John Penruddock, a Wiltshire landowner. They began planning another revolt to take place in early 1655, claiming support from Thomas Fairfax, former commander of the New Model Army, Leveller radicals like Edward Sexby and John Wildman, and moderate Presbyterians opposed to Cromwell. Hyde and Ormonde were sceptical of such claims and although some like Sexby did participate, the idea of widespread or significant support was largely imaginary, while Willis ensured Thurloe was informed of the details well in advance.

Despite their opposition, the plot was approved by Charles II who sent some of his most trusted advisors to co-ordinate. They included Daniel O'Neill and Nicholas Armorer, who were both arrested on entering England and held in Dover Castle, but escaped with the help of Royalist sympathisers within the garrison. A few days later, they were joined by the Earl of Rochester, a long serving and highly experienced Royalist cavalry leader responsible for raising the north. Targets included the ports of Hull, Newcastle and Carlisle, along with co-ordinated risings in Nottinghamshire, Cheshire and the Royalist heartland in the West Country.

== The rising ==
Rochester was accompanied by Sir Joseph Wagstaffe, a professional soldier of fortune who served under the Parliamentarian leader John Hampden before switching sides in January 1643; when the First English Civil War ended in 1646, he was a major-general in the Royalist Army of the West. Wagstaffe was sent to join Penruddock, while Rochester co-ordinated the northern uprising. Pre-warned, government troops had already secured Hull and Newcastle; on 8 March, fewer than 150 men assembled on Marston Moor outside York and were quickly dispersed by soldiers under Colonel Robert Lilburne, brother of Leveller radical John Lilburne. A number of senior Royalists were captured, including Sir Henry Slingsby, although Rochester and Armorer escaped abroad, as did O'Neill. Another group of 300 assembled at Rufford Abbey in Nottinghamshire but went home when their leaders failed to show up.

Penruddock uprising; key locations

The western revolt was intended to draw troops away from Kent and allow Charles to land at Dover; by 11 March, Penruddock and Wagstaffe were aware the other risings had failed but despite this decided to proceed. Their original objective was Winchester where the local assizes were being held; after learning its garrison had been reinforced, they targeted Salisbury instead. Having assembled around 150 men, they captured the town and took several prisoners, including John Dove, a regime loyalist who was High Sheriff of Wiltshire; Wagstaffe wanted to execute him for refusing to proclaim Charles II but was over-ruled by Penruddock.

Taking Dove with them, the rebels left Salisbury next morning, having doubled their numbers to around 400 by emptying the local jails and marched west through Blandford and Sherborne. They reached Yeovil on the evening of the 12th, where they hoped to be joined by the Marquis of Hertford along with 3,000 to 4,000 recruits. Despite the presence of Hertford's personal chaplain, Humphrey Henchman, they failed to turn up and Penruddock led his small force into Dorset, heading for the Royalist stronghold of Cornwall.

Pursued by troops under John Desborough, appointed 'Major General in the West' by Cromwell, they crossed into Devon on 14 March and stopped for the night in South Molton. Around 10 pm, they were attacked by 60 troopers from the Exeter garrison led by Captain Unton Croke; after a brief skirmish, most of the Royalists surrendered, including Penruddock. Wagstaffe avoided capture and managed to make his way back to the Spanish Netherlands.

Sexby was another who escaped to Flanders where English exiles were given shelter by the Spanish; in the April 1656 Treaty of Brussels, they agreed to provide military backing to restore Charles in return for support against France. The failure of Penruddock's Rising meant attention returned to assassinating Cromwell; Sexby organised an unsuccessful attempt by Miles Sindercombe to blow him up in 1656.

== Aftermath ==
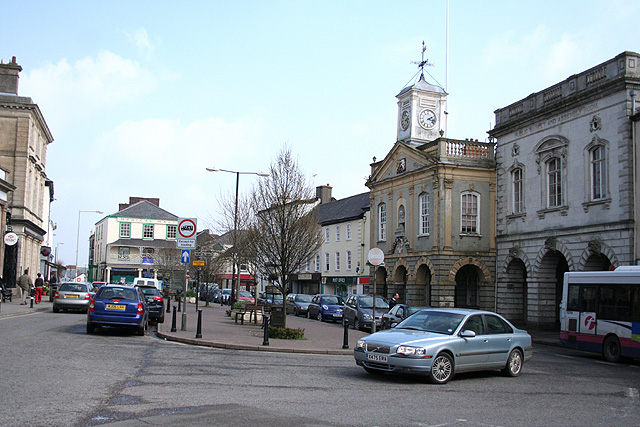
South Molton town centre, where the rebels were trapped on 14 March 1655

Penruddock was tried for high treason in Exeter on 18 April 1655; he argued opposing Cromwell could not be considered treason, an argument supported by other senior legal officers, but was found guilty. Although his wife travelled to London to plead for his life, Cromwell refused to commute his sentence and he was beheaded on 16 May. Thirty-two others received the death sentence, of whom eleven were executed; the remainder were reprieved but transported to Barbados as indentured labourers along with seventy of those captured at South Molton. They were sold on behalf of Martin Noell, a prominent London merchant with extensive interests in the West Indies, Major Thomas Alderne and Captain Henry Hatsell.

Those transported included Marcellus Rivers and Oxenbridge Foyle who in 1659 submitted a petition to Parliament complaining about their treatment by the planters who had bought them. Rivers claimed one man, a Mr. Diamond of Tiverton, had been transported despite being 76 years old and merely having expressed a wish to join the rebels. Although it is unknown whether Foyle returned to England, Rivers returned at The Restoration in 1660 when he petitioned for the exclusion of Martin Noell from the Act of Oblivion extended to Parliamentarians. This proved unsuccessful; despite previous accusations in 1658 of making illegal profits from transporting Royalist prisoners, Noell had protected himself by secretly funding Charles and was knighted in 1662.

One of the most significant outcomes of the revolt was Cromwell's response; England and Wales was divided into eleven regions, each controlled by a senior army officer, with wide-ranging powers. Known as the Rule of the Major-Generals, it proved deeply unpopular and united the regime's opponents against it in a way armed insurrection had failed to achieve.

== Sources ==
- Aylmer, GE (2004). "Noell, Sir Martin". Oxford Dictionary of National Biography (online ed.). Oxford University Press. doi:10.1093/ref:odnb/37814. (Subscription, Wikipedia Library access or UK public library membership required.)
- Durston, Christopher (2004). "Penruddock, John". Oxford Dictionary of National Biography (online ed.). Oxford University Press. doi:10.1093/ref:odnb/21893. (Subscription, Wikipedia Library access or UK public library membership required.)
- Goodwin, Gordon (2004). "Dove, John". Oxford Dictionary of National Biography (online ed.). Oxford University Press. doi:10.1093/ref:odnb/7949. (Subscription, Wikipedia Library access or UK public library membership required.)
- Lay, Paul (2020). Providence Lost: The Rise and Fall of Cromwell's Protectorate. Head of Zeus. ISBN 978-1781852569.
- Little, Patrick (2007). "Major-generals (act. 1655–1657)". Oxford Dictionary of National Biography (online ed.). Oxford University Press. doi:10.1093/ref:odnb/95468. (Subscription, Wikipedia Library access or UK public library membership required.)
- Newman, Peter (1978). The Royalist Army in Northern England, Volume II (PDF) (PHD). University of York.
- Plant, David (25 August 2008). "The Sealed Knot". BCW Project.
- Rivers, Marcellus; Foyle, Oxenbridge (1659). Englands Slavery, Or Barbados Merchandize; Represented in a Petition to ... Parliament by M. Rivers and O. Foyle, Gentlemen, on the Behalf of Themselves and Three-score and Ten More Free-born Englishmen Sold (uncondemned) Into Slavery: Together with Letters Written to Some Honourable Members of Parliament.
- Roberts, Stephen (2009). "Sealed Knot (1653–1659)". Oxford Dictionary of National Biography (online ed.). Oxford University Press. doi:10.1093/ref:odnb/98250. (Subscription, Wikipedia Library access or UK public library membership required.)
- Schomburgk, Robert Hermann (1848). The history of Barbados; comprising a geographical and statistical description of the island; a sketch of the historical events since the settlement; and an account of its geology and natural productions. Longman.
