= Sir Edmund Fortescue, 1st Baronet =

English politician

Sir Edmund Fortescue, 1st Baronet (baptised 22 September 1642 – 30 December 1666) was an English politician, MP for Plympton Erle.

He was the second son of Sir Edmund Fortescue of Fallapit and his wife Jane, daughter of Thomas Southcote.

He was educated at Balliol College, Oxford, matriculating in 1658.

He married Margery, daughter of Henry Sandys, 5th Baron Sandys. They had one son and two daughters:

- Sir Sandys Fortescue, 2nd Baronet (1661–1683)
- Jane Fortescue (1662–1682), married William Coleman
- Sarah Fortescue (1664–1685)

He was knighted and created a baronet on 31 March 1664, and elected MP for Plympton Erle in October 1666. He died on 30 December 1666, and was buried at East Allington.

Parliament of England
Preceded by Thomas Hele; Sir William Strode	Member of Parliament for Plympton Erle; October–December 1666; With: Sir William Strode	Succeeded by Sir Nicholas Slanning, Bt; Sir William Strode
Baronetage of England
New creation	Baronet (of Fallapit); 1664–1666	Succeeded by Sandys Fortescue
