= Thomas Reynell (MP, died 1698) =

English lawyer and politician

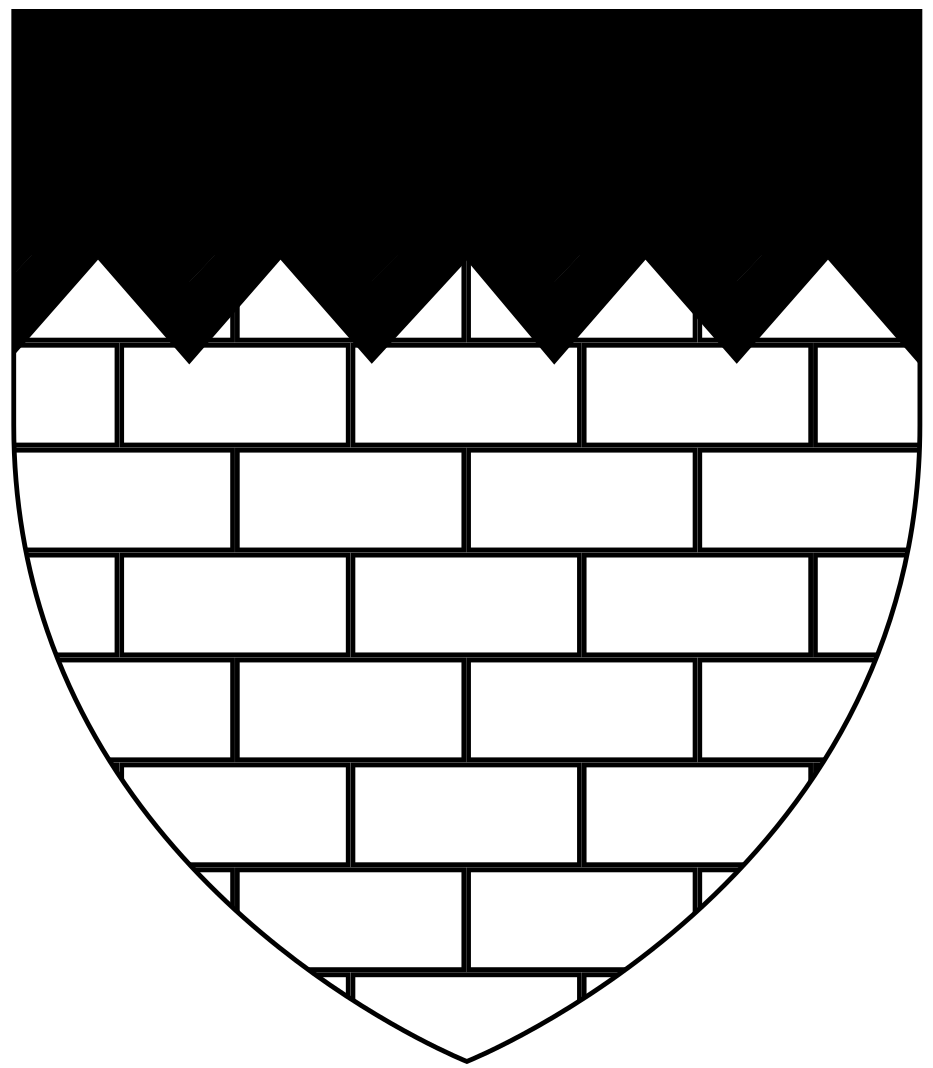
- Arms of Reynell: Argent, masonry sable a chief indented of the second

Member of Parliament for Ashburton
- In office 1659; 1679-1685; 1689-1690

High Sheriff of Devon
- In office 1677-1678

Member of Parliament for Devon
- In office 1654–1656

Personal details
- Born: 13 September 1625 England
- Died: 1698 (aged 72–73)
- Spouse(s): Mary Bennet Elizabeth Gould (m. 1673)
- Children: 10, including Richard
- Relatives: Richard Reynell (brother); Richard Reynell (uncle); Carew Reynell (uncle); Richard Reynell (grandfather)
- Education: Exeter College, Oxford

Thomas Reynell (13 September 1625 – 1698) of East Ogwell, Devon, was an English lawyer and politician who sat in the House of Commons at various times between 1654 and 1689.

== Biography ==
Reynell was the eldest son of Sir Richard Reynell of East Ogwell, Devon and his wife (and cousin) Mary Reynell, daughter of Richard Reynell of Creedy Widger, near Crediton. He was the elder brother of Sir Richard Reynell, 1st Baronet, Lord Chief Justice of Ireland. He was educated at Exeter College, Oxford in 1640 and entered Middle Temple in 1641. In 1647 he was J.P. He succeeded to the family estates on the death of his father in 1648. In 1649 he was called to the bar.

Reynell was JP for Devon again and was commissioner for assessment for Devon in 1652. He was JP for Devon again in 1653 and remained in post until 1660. In 1654, he was elected Member of Parliament for Devon for the First Protectorate Parliament. He was re-elected MP for Devon in 1656 for the Second Protectorate Parliament. He was commissioner for assessment in 1657 and commissioner for militia in 1659. In 1659 he was elected MP for Ashburton in the Third Protectorate Parliament.

Reynell was commissioner for assessment from January 1660 to 1663 and commissioner for militia in March 1660. He did not stand for parliament after the Restoration when he was described as "an arrant Presbyterian and a very dangerous Commonwealthman". He became JP for Devon again in August 1660 until 1676. In 1667 he was commissioner for inquiry into the Newfoundland government. He was commissioner for assessment from 1673 to 1680 and commissioner for recusants for Devon in 1675. From 1677 to 1678 he was High Sheriff of Devon. He was elected MP for Ashburton again for the two parliaments of 1679 and 1681. In May 1685, he was taken into custody prior to the Duke of Monmouth's invasion. He was JP for Devon again from 1687 until his death. In March 1688 he was commissioner for inquiry into recusancy fines for Devon, Dorset and Cornwall and from May to October 1688 he was Deputy Lieutenant. He was alderman for Totnes from April to October 1688. In 1689 he was elected MP for Ashburton again. In 1690 he stepped aside to allow his brother Richard, who had been temporarily removed from his position on the Irish Bench, to hold the seat. He was commissioner for assessment from 1689 to 1690.

Reynell died at the age of 73 and was buried at East Ogwell on 1 March 1698.

Reynell married firstly Mary Bennet, daughter of John Bennet of London and had a son and four daughters. He married secondly by licence dated 25 July 1673, Elizabeth Gould, widow of William Vincent, merchant of Exeter, and daughter of James Gould, merchant of London. They had three sons and two daughters. He was succeeded by Richard his eldest son by the second marriage, who was MP for Ashburton between 1702 and 1734.

Parliament of England
Preceded by George Monck John Carew; Thomas Saunders; Christopher Martyn; James Erisey, Francis Rous Richard Sweet	Member of Parliament for Devon; 1654–1656; With: Sir John Northcote, Bt 1654–1656; Arthur Upton 1654–1656; Robert Rolle 1654–1656; William Morice 1654–1656; John Hale 1654– 1656; Thomas Saunders 1654–1656; Henry Hatsell 1654–1656; William Bastard 1654; William Fry 1654; John Quick 1654; Sir John Yonge 1656; Edmund Fowell 1656; John Doddridge 1656	Succeeded by Sir John Northcote, Bt; Robert Rolle
Preceded by Not represented in Second Protectorate Parliament	Member of Parliament for Ashburton; 1659; With: Sir John Fowell, 2nd Baronet	Succeeded by Not represented in Restored Rump
Preceded by William Stawell; Rawlin Mallock	Member of Parliament for Ashburton; 1679–1685; With: William Stawell; Richard Duke 1679; William Stawell1681	Succeeded by William Stawell; Edward Yarde
Preceded by William Stawell; Edward Yarde	Member of Parliament for Ashburton; 1689–1690; With: Sir Walter Yonge	Succeeded by William Stawell; Sir Richard Reynell
