= Robert Rolle (died 1660) =

English politician

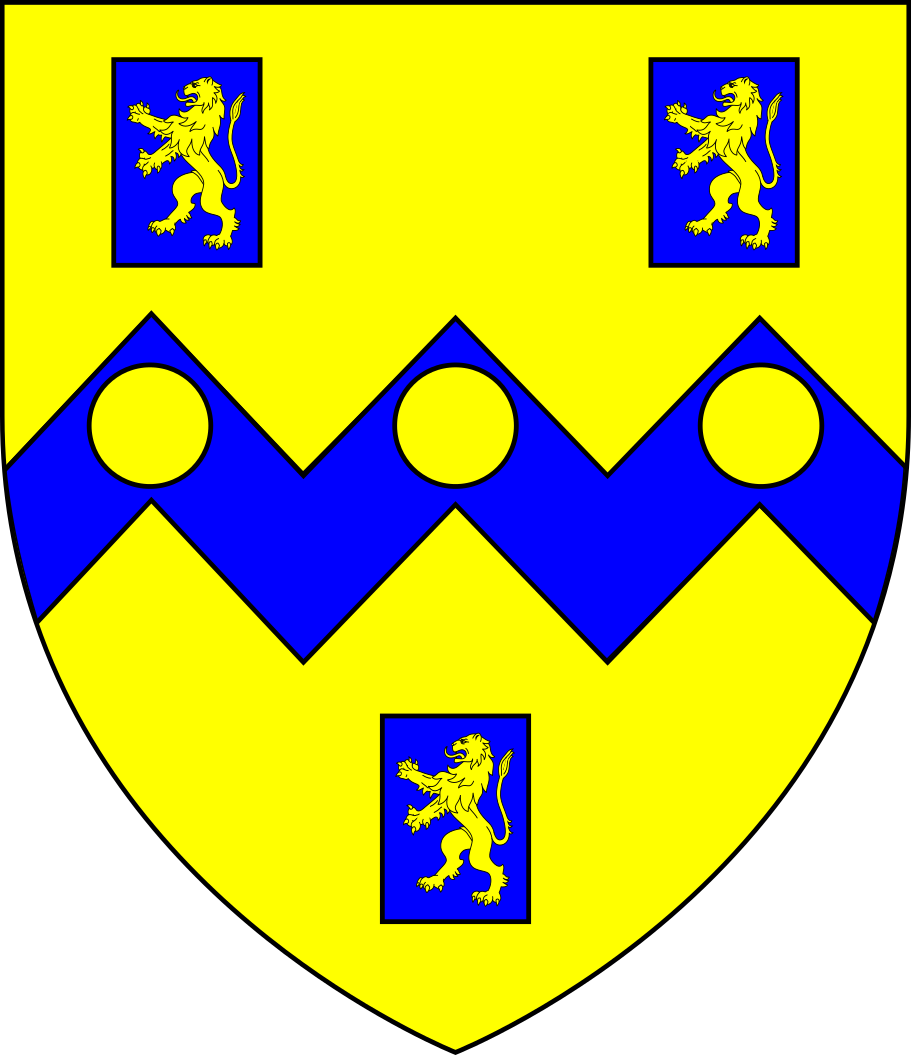
- Arms of Rolle: Or, on a fesse dancetté between three billets azure each charged with a lion rampant of the first three bezants

Member of Parliament for Callington
- In office 1660

Member of Parliament for Devon
- In office 1654–1659

High Sheriff of Devon
- In office 1649-1650

Personal details
- Born: c. 1622
- Died: 1660 (aged 37–38)
- Spouse: Arabella Clinton
- Children: 2
- Parent: Samuel Rolle (father)
- Relatives: Henry Rolle (uncle); John Rolle (uncle); Thomas Wise (grandfather); Margaret Rolle (granddaughter)

Robert Rolle (c. 1622 – 1660) was an English politician who sat in the House of Commons at various times between 1654 and 1660.

== Origins ==
Rolle was the son of Sir Samuel Rolle of Heanton Satchville, Petrockstowe, Devon, and his wife Margaret Wise daughter of Sir Thomas Wise.

== Career ==
He was admitted for his legal training at the Inner Temple in 1640. He was appointed High Sheriff of Devon for 1649–50. In 1654 he was elected Member of Parliament for Devon in the First Protectorate Parliament and was re-elected MP for Devon in 1656 for the Second Protectorate Parliament and in 1659 for the Third Protectorate Parliament. In January 1660 he was appointed a member of the Rump Parliament's final Council of State but does not appear to have attended any meetings, likely due to the Council enforcing an oath abjuring the Stuart family and any Single Person or House of Lords. He was elected MP for the family's pocket borough of Callington in the Convention Parliament in 1660, but died in the same year.

== Marriage and children ==
Rolle married Lady Arabella Clinton, the younger daughter of Theophilus Clinton, 4th Earl of Lincoln and 12th Baron Clinton (d.1667) and had a son and a daughter:

- Samuel Rolle (d.1719) who married Margaret Tuckfield and had issue:
  - Margaret Rolle, 15th Baroness Clinton (d.1781). Margaret inherited the title Baroness Clinton from her cousin Hugh Fortescue, 1st Earl Clinton, 1st Baron Fortescue and 14th Baron Clinton (d.1751). She married firstly Robert Walpole, 2nd Earl of Orford (d.1751), by whom she had issue, and secondly Sewallis Shirley, son of Robert Shirley, 1st Earl Ferrers.
- Bridget Rolle (1648–1721) who married Francis Trefusis and had a son, Samuel Trefusis (1677–1722). After the death of George Walpole, 3rd Earl of Orford in 1791, Samuel's great-grandson Robert Trefusis (1764–1797) established his claim to the Barony of Clinton in 1794.

Parliament of England
Preceded by George Monck John Carew; Thomas Saunders; Christopher Martyn; James Erisey, Francis Rous Richard Sweet	Member of Parliament for Devon; 1654–1659; With: Sir John Northcote, Bt 1654–1659; Arthur Upton 1654–1656; Thomas Reynell 1654–1656; William Morice 1654–1656; John Hale 1654– 1656; Thomas Saunders 1654–1656; Henry Hatsell 1654–1656; William Bastard 1654; William Fry 1654; John Quick 1654; Sir John Yonge 1656; Edmund Fowell 1656; John Doddridge 1656	Succeeded by Not represented in Restored Rump
