= Elisha Crymes =

English politician (c.1614–1690)

Elisha Crymes (c. 1614 – March 1690) was an English politician who sat in the House of Commons at various times between 1646 and 1661.

Crymes was the son of William Crymes, of Buckland Monachorum, Devon. He matriculated at Exeter College, Oxford on 21 November 1634, aged 19. He was at Lincoln's Inn in 1634. In August 1646, he was elected Member of Parliament for Tavistock as a recruiter to the Long Parliament. He was secluded under Pride's Purge in 1648. In 1659 he was elected MP for Bere Alston for the Third Protectorate Parliament. He was elected MP for Tavistock again in April 1660 for the Convention Parliament until his election was declared void on 3 May. In 1661 he was elected MP for Bere Alston in the Cavalier Parliament until his election was declared void on 16 May.

Crymes died at the age of about 75 and was buried at Buckland Monachorum on 17 March 1690.

Parliament of England
Preceded by Hon. John Russell; John Pym	Member of Parliament for Tavistock; 1646; With: Edward Fowell	Succeeded by Not represented in Rump Parliament
Preceded by Not represented in Second Protectorate Parliament	Member of Parliament for Bere Alston; 1659; With: Sir John Maynard	Succeeded by Not represented in Restored Rump
