= Edmund Fowell =

English politician

Edmund Fowell (c. 1598 – 27 February 1664) was an English politician who sat in the House of Commons at various times between 1646 and 1660.

Fowell was the son of John Fowell of Plymouth. He matriculated at Broadgates Hall, Oxford on 3 May 1616, aged 18. He was called to the bar at Middle Temple in 1625.

In August 1646, Fowell was elected Member of Parliament for Tavistock in the Long Parliament. He sat until 1648 when he was secluded under Pride's Purge. In 1656 he was elected MP for Devon for the Second Protectorate Parliament and in 1659 he was elected MP for Tavistock in the Third Protectorate Parliament.

In 1660, Fowell was elected MP for Plymouth in the Convention Parliament in a double return. He was seated on 27 April but was replaced on 9 June 1660 by Samuel Trelawny, after which he retired.

Parliament of England
Preceded by John Russell; John Pym	Member of Parliament for Tavistock; 1646–1648; With: Elisha Crimes	Succeeded by Not represented in Rump Parliament
Preceded by Thomas Saunders; Robert Rolle; Arthur Upton; Thomas Reynell; William Morice John Hale; William Bastard; William Fry; Sir John Northcote, 1st Baronet; Henry Hatsell John Quick	Member of Parliament for Devon; 1656; With: Thomas Saunders; Robert Rolle; Arthur Upton; Thomas Reynell; William Morice; John Hale; Sir John Northcote, Bt; Captain Henry Hatsell; Sir John Yonge; John Doddridge	Succeeded by Sir John Northcote, 1st Baronet; Robert Rolle
Preceded by Not represented in Second Protectorate Parliament	Member of Parliament for Tavistock; 1659; With: Henry Hatsell	Succeeded by Not represented in restored Rump
