= Christopher Martyn =

17th-century English politician

Christopher Martyn (c. 1617 – 26 January 1678) was an English politician who sat in the House of Commons variously between 1646 and 1660. He fought in the Parliamentary army in the English Civil War

Martyn was a gentleman of Plympton and became a captain in the parliamentary army. In April 1644, he was commanding the Plymouth garrison and attacked the Royalists at New Bridge taking 200 prisoners. Two days later he repulsed a counter-attack and chased the Royalist cavalry to Plympton Bridge near where their army was stationed.

In 1646, Martyn was elected Member of Parliament for Plympton Erle in the Long Parliament. He resumed his seat in the Rump Parliament after Pride's Purge with some hesitation. In 1653, he was nominated as one of the representatives for Devon in the Barebones Parliament. He was elected as MP for Plympton Erle again in 1659 for the Third Protectorate Parliament, and was re-elected for Plympton Earle in 1660 in the Convention Parliament.

Martyn married Jane Snelling who brought him property at Plympton.

Parliament of England
Preceded by Sir Thomas Hele, 1st Baronet; Hugh Potter	Member of Parliament for Plympton Erle; 1646–1653; With: Hugh Potter 1646–1648	Succeeded by Not represented in Barebones Parliament
Preceded by Not represented in Rump Parliament	Member of Parliament for Devon; 1653; With: George Monck; John Carew; Thomas Saunders; James Erisey, Francis Rous, Richard Sweet	Succeeded by Robert Rolle; Sir John Northcote, Bt; Arthur Upton; Thomas Reynell; William Morice; John Hale; Thomas Saunders; Henry Hatsell; William Bastard; William Fry; John Quick
Preceded by Not represented in Second Protectorate Parliament	Member of Parliament for Plympton Erle; 1659–1660; With: Henry Hatsell 1659; Sir William Strode 1660	Succeeded by Sir William Strode; Thomas Hele
