= Hugh Potter =

English lawyer and politician

Hugh Potter (1596 – 12 February 1662) was an English lawyer and politician who sat in the House of Commons at various times between 1640 and 1662.

Potter was the son of Tobias Potter of Iddesleigh, Devon and his wife Susan Osborne, daughter of Hugh Osborne of Iddesleigh. He was baptised on 1 August 1596. He entered Lincoln's Inn in on 10 June 1615 and was called to the bar in 1622. He became secretary to Henry Percy, 9th Earl of Northumberland and was responsible for the Earl's estates.

In April 1640, Potter was elected Member of Parliament for Berwick upon Tweed in the Short Parliament. He was elected MP Plympton Erle for the Long Parliament in November 1640. He sat until 1648 when he was excluded under Pride's Purge.

In 1661, Potter was elected MP for Cockermouth in the Cavalier Parliament and sat until his death in 1662.

Potter died at the age of 65

Parliament of England
Vacant Parliament suspended since 1629	Member of Parliament for Berwick upon Tweed; 1640; With: Sir Thomas Widdrington	Succeeded by Sir John Fenwick; Henry Percy
Preceded by Sir Richard Strode; Sir Nicholas Slanning; Sir Thomas Hele, 1st Baronet	Member of Parliament for Plympton Erle; 1640–1648; With: Sir Thomas Hele, 1st Baronet 1640–1644; Christopher Martyn 1646–1648	Succeeded by Christopher Martyn
Preceded by Sir Wilfrid Lawson, 1st Baronet, of Isell; Richard Tolson	Member of Parliament for Cockermouth; 1661–1679; With: Sir Wilfrid Lawson, 1st Baronet, of Isell	Succeeded by Sir Wilfrid Lawson, 1st Baronet, of Isell; Robert Scawen
