= Edmund Fortescue (died 1647) =

Sheriff of Devon and Pro-Royalist in the English Civil War

Sir Edmund Fortescue (1610–1647) was an English Royalist commander.

== Early life ==
Fortescue was baptized on 16 July 1609 at his father's seat of Fallapit, South Devon. He was the first son and heir of John Fortescue (Sep 1586-1649), sheriff of Devon, and his first wife, Sara Prideaux (-1628), daughter of Edmund Prideaux of Netherton.

== High Sheriff ==
In 1642 he was appointed Sheriff of Devon. It was an object of considerable importance to the king to secure as sheriffs trustworthy men of local influence, and the selection of so young a man as Fortescue, whose father was still living, implies that he had already secured himself a reputation for courage or ability. In the beginning of December 1642, Fortescue summoned the posse comitatus of the county to meet him at Modbury, in order to join Sir Ralph Hopton, who was then marching from Cornwall to besiege Plymouth. About two thousand men answered the summons and assembled on 6 December, intending on the next day to join the main army, whose headquarters were at Plympton, only three miles distant. During the night, Colonel Ruthven, commanding the Parliamentary forces at Plymouth, organised a sortie from that town of some five hundred dragoons, who, avoiding the village of Plympton, fell upon Fortescue's Trained bands at Modbury. The raw recruits dispersed at the first alarm, and the troopers at once occupied the village. They then proceeded to Modbury Castle, a seat of the Champernowne family, fired the house, broke in and took prisoner Fortescue, his brother Peter, Sir Edward Seymour and his eldest son, M.P. for Devonshire, Arthur Basset, "a notable malignant," and a number of other gentlemen.

The victorious cavalry then marched to Dartmouth, whence they despatched their prisoners by sea to London. On his arrival in London, Fortescue was sent to Windsor Castle: an inscription on the wall of a small chamber, in Norman tower of Windsor Castle, consisting of his name with a rude cut of his coat of arms and the words "Pour le Roy C.," and "Edmund Fortescue, imprisoned here 12th January 1642" serves to identify the room in which he was imprisoned which still remains. He was afterwards transferred to Winchester House. Before the end of 1643, he was exchanged or released.

== Siege of Fort Charles ==
On 9 December 1643, Fortescue received a commission from Prince Maurice to repair "the Old Bull-worke near Salcombe, now utterly ruined and decayed," and to hold it for the king. The fort of Salcombe, or Fort Charles as it was renamed by Fortescue, stands on a rock at the entrance of Salcombe harbour near Kingsbridge, approachable from the land at low tide, but completely surrounded by the sea at high water. A manuscript account of the details of the rebuilding, fortifying, and victualling the place is printed in Lord Clermont's History. The inventories of provisions given in this account show that nothing necessary for the support of the garrison during a prolonged siege was neglected: more than thirty hogsheads of meat, ten hogsheads of punch, ten tuns of cider, two thousand "poor jacks," six thousand dried whiting, and six hundredweight of tobacco, are among the items of the provisions supplied, while such entries as "twenty pots with sweetmeats, and a good box of all sorts of especially good dry preserves," one butt of sack, and "two cases of bottles filled with rare and good strong waters," show that Fortescue did not forget to provide for the table of the officers' mess. The garrison consisted of eleven officers, Sir Charles Luckner being second in command, and two of Fortescue's brothers serving under him, a chaplain, a surgeon, two laundresses, and 43 non-commissioned officers and men. Of these, one was killed during the siege, three were wounded, and two deserted.

The fort was occupied in November or December 1644, and in January 1645/6 a force was sent from Plymouth who erected a battery of three guns in a commanding position on the mainland, exactly opposite and slightly above the small promontory on which the fort is situated. The siege lasted until May 1646, when Fortescue capitulated to Colonel Ralph Weldon, then in command of Plymouth. He obtained very favourable terms for the garrison, the articles of surrender stipulating that the whole force should be allowed to march out with all the honours of war and proceed in safety to their own homes; Fortescue himself and the other officers obtaining permission to remain at home unmolested for three months, at the end of which time they were free either to make their peace with the Parliament or to go abroad from any port they should select. Fortescue carried away with him the key of Fort Charles, which still remains in the possession of his descendant.

== Later life ==
Unwilling or unable to come to terms with the parliament, Fortescue made his way to Delft, where he lived during the brief remainder of his life. In the 'Propositions of the Lords and Commons for a peace sent to His Majesty at Newcastle’ in July 1646, he is included in a list of persons who are to be removed from 'his majesty's councils and to be restrained from coming within the verge of the court, bearing any public office or having any employment concerning the state'.

== Private life ==
Fortescue died in January or February 1647, at the age of 37, and was buried in the 'New Church' of Delft. He had married Jane, daughter of Thomas Southcote of Mohuns Ottery, and had a son, Edmund, created a baronet in 1664, and three daughters. There is a portrait of Fortescue at Fallapit House, and a Dutch engraving, a facsimile of which is given by Lord Clermont.
