= Joseph Wagstaffe =

Royalist officer in the English Civil War

Sir Joseph Wagstaffe (1611? – 1666/67) was a Royalist officer during the English Civil War and one of the leaders in the Penruddock uprising of 1655.

== Origins and birth ==
Wagstaffe, born about 1611, was probably the seventh and youngest son of Richard Wagstaffe of Harbury in Warwickshire, by his wife Anne, daughter of John Hanslap of Stoneythorpe in the same county. If so, he is probably to be identified with the "Josephus Wagstaf", son of Richard, who was christened at Harbury on 13 August 1611.

== Military career ==
Wagstaffe was a soldier of fortune, and at the beginning of 1642 was major in an Irish regiment in the service of France. In June 1642 he became lieutenant-colonel in the army destined by the parliament for the recovery of Ireland, and in the following autumn held the same rank in Hampden's regiment of foot in the Earl of Essex's army. Taken prisoner by the royalists in January 1643, he changed sides and accepted a commission to raise a regiment for the king. This made Wagstaffe one of the only officers from either side to switch allegiances during the war. Subsequently, he was major-general of foot under Prince Maurice in the west of England, was knighted at Crediton on 27 July 1644, and distinguished himself by his soldierly retreat in the disastrous Battle of Langport.

== Penruddock uprising ==
In 1655, the western royalists asked for Wagstaffe to be their leader in their intended rising against Cromwell, he being well known to them and generally beloved. Clarendon characterises him as fitted 'rather for execution than counsel, a stout man who looked not far before him, yet he had a great companionableness in his nature, which exceedingly prevailed with those who in the intermission of fighting loved to spend their time in jollity and mirth.' With about two hundred Wiltshire royalists Wagstaffe entered Salisbury early on 12 March 1655, and proclaimed Charles II. The judges on circuit and sheriff were seized in their beds, and Wagstaffe thought of hanging them as a seasonable example, but was prevented by the opposition of Colonel Penruddock and the country gentlemen. Leaving Salisbury with about four hundred men, the royalists marched into Dorset, but gained few recruits on their way. When they entered Somerset their numbers began to diminish, and the few who remained were taken or dispersed by Captain Unton Croke at South Molton on the night of 14 March. Wagstaffe is said to have escaped by leaping his horse over the north wall of the churchyard and a gate in the wall is now known as "The Wagstaffe Gate".

== Later life ==
Wagstaffe himself evaded all the searches subsequently made after him, and was back in Holland by July. He survived the Restoration, petitioned for the reversion of an office [which he did not obtain], and received a small grant of some of the late king's goods in 1662.
