= Richard Strode (died 1669) =

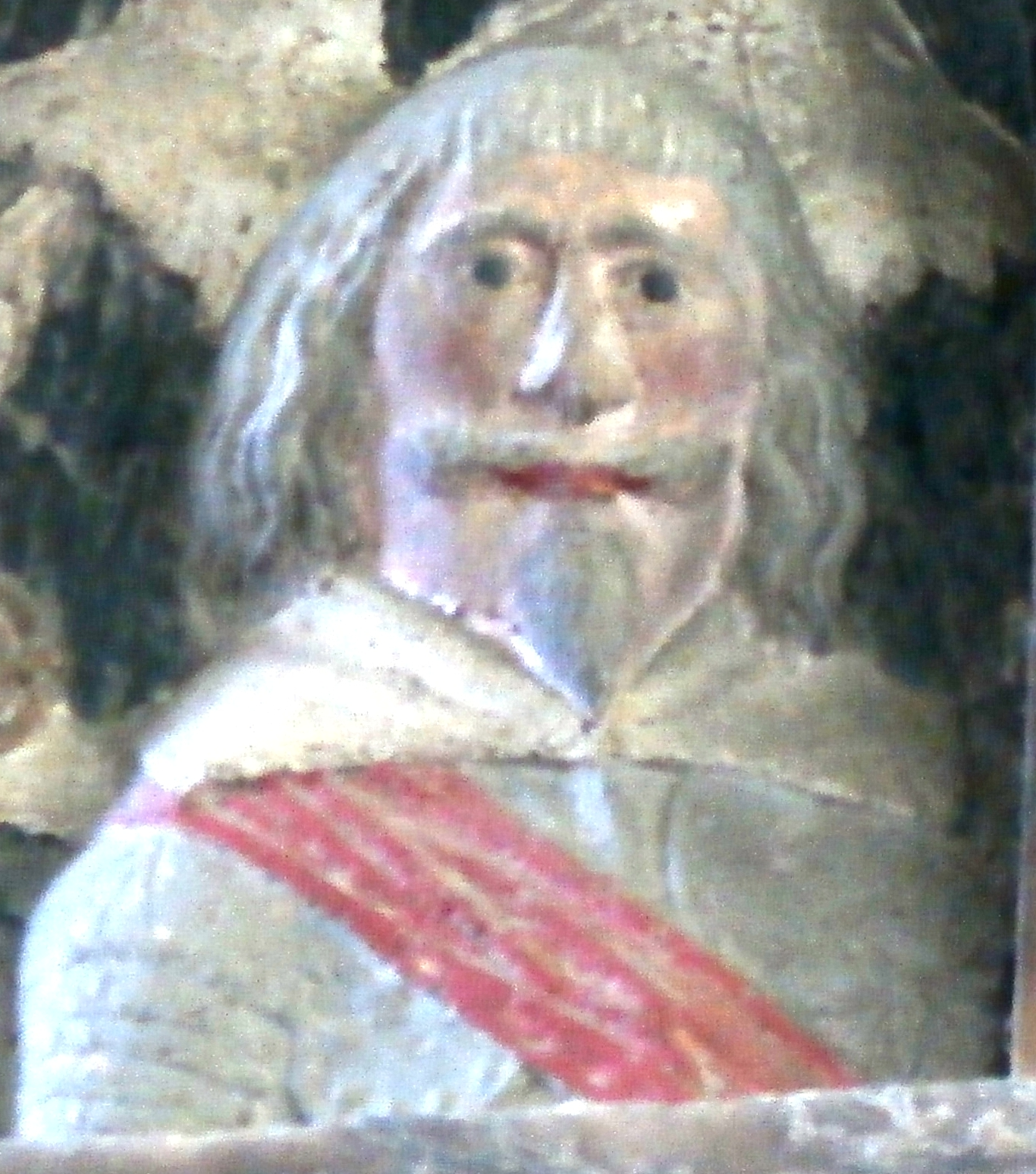
Sir Richard Strode (1584–1669), detail from his father's mural monument in St Mary's Church, Plympton St Mary

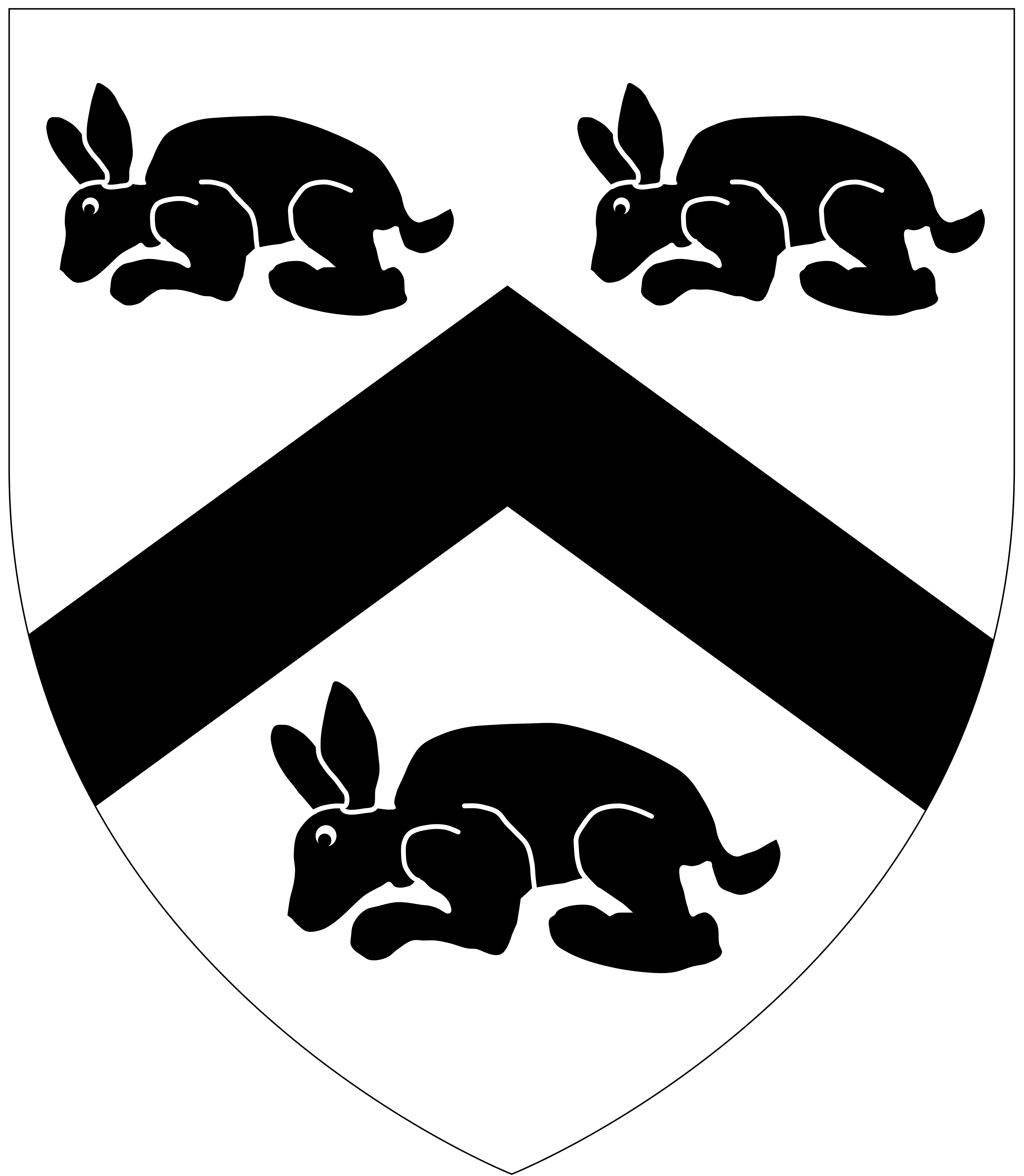
Arms of Strode: Argent, a chevron between three conies courant sable

Sir Richard Strode (25 June 1584 – 9 October 1669) of Newnham, Plympton St Mary, Devon and of Chalmington in Dorset, was a member of the Devonshire gentry who served as MP for Bere Alston in 1604, Bridport in 1626 and for Plympton Erle in 1640. He was by religion a puritan and towards the end of his life a baptist. During the Civil War he was a parliamentarian and raised a force of 3,000 dragoons.

== Origins ==
Strode was baptised at Bovey Tracey on 1 July 1584 and was the eldest son of Sir William Strode (1562–1637) of Newnham, Plympton St Mary, MP for Devon in 1597 and 1624, for Plympton Erle in 1601, 1604, 1621 and 1625, and for Plymouth in 1614, High Sheriff of Devon from 1593 to 1594 and Deputy Lieutenant of Devon from 1599. His mother (his father's first wife) was Mary Southcott (died 1618), daughter of Thomas Southcott of Bovey Tracey, Devon.

== Career ==
He matriculated at St John's College, Cambridge in 1598. At the age of 20 in 1604 Strode was elected Member of Parliament for Bere Alston in Devon, on his father's interest, and was knighted a month later. He was elected MP for Bridport in 1626.

In April 1640, Strode was elected Member of Parliament for Plympton Erle in the Short Parliament in what appears to be an unresolved double return.

Following the death in about 1608 of his first wife who was a member of the Strode family of Parnham, Strode fell into dispute with his cousins, claiming inheritance of the Parnham estates for the son of his second wife. Sir John Strode consistently blocked Richard Strode's attempts to bring the matter to court and the situation became more grave when the families were on opposite sides in the Civil War. Richard Strode's younger brother was the parliamentarian William Strode (1594–1645), MP, one of the Five Members whose impeachment and attempted unconstitutional arrest by King Charles I in the House of Commons in 1642 sparked the Civil War. The Parnham Strodes, Richard's wife's family, were royalists. Sir John Strode's widow, Lady Ann, was struck dead by a Parliamentarian soldier while defending her home during the Civil War. Strode made copious annotations to an almanack "An Ephemeris for the Year 1652" by Nicholas Culpeper in which he fiercely attacked the Parnham Strodes. Later ramblings suggest that Strode had become mentally unstable and he was imprisoned in the Fleet prison with debts of £200. He wrote long letters to Oliver Cromwell setting out his grievances and he was eventually released as being of unsound mind.

== Marriages and children ==
Strode married three times, firstly in about 1597 to his cousin Catherine (alias Mary) Strode (died c. 1608), daughter and heiress of Sir Robert Strode (died 1616) of Parnham in Dorset. She brought to the marriage several estates in Devon and Dorset, including Lower Chalmington, Dorset, and Parnham, title to which was later disputed. By Catherine he had three daughters.

Secondly he married Elizabeth Erle (died 1652) daughter of Thomas Erle of Dorset. By her he had eight daughters and one son, William Strode (1614–1676), MP for Plympton, who inherited Newnham from his father.

His third wife was Anne Drake, daughter of Sir John Drake (died 1636) of Ash in the parish of Musbury, Devon. They had a son, Joseph Strode of Chalmington, Dorset, whom his mother called "John". He inherited the estate of Chalmington from his father, who had inherited it following his marriage to his first wife Catherine Strode. By Anne, Strode also had a daughter, Susan Strode, heir to her brother Joseph. She married Hugh Chudleigh (died 1707) of Ashton, Devon, third son of Sir George Chudleigh, 2nd Baronet (1612–1691).

== Death and burial ==
Strode died in 1669 at the age of 85 and was buried on 9 October 1669, at Plympton St Mary. In his will he left to King Charles II "the manor of Parnham which is or ought to be mine".

== Sources ==
- Ferris, John. P. & Hunneyball, Paul, biography of Richard Strode (d.1669) published in History of Parliament: House of Commons 1604-1629, ed. Andrew Thrush and John P. Ferris, 2010
- Vivian, Lt.Col. J.L., (Ed.) The Visitations of the County of Devon: Comprising the Heralds' Visitations of 1531, 1564 & 1620, Exeter, 1895, p. 719, pedigree of Strode of Newnham

Parliament of England
Preceded by Charles Lister; John Langford	Member of Parliament for Bere Alston; 1604; With: Sir Arthur Atye; Humphrey May	Succeeded by Thomas Crewe; Sir Richard White
Preceded by Lewis Dyve; Sir John Strode	Member of Parliament for Bridport; 1626; With: Lewis Dyve	Succeeded by Thomas Pawlet; Bampfield Chafin
Vacant Parliament suspended since 1629	Member of Parliament for Plympton Erle; 1640; With: Sir Nicholas Slanning; Sir Thomas Hele, 1st Baronet	Succeeded by Sir Nicholas Slanning; Michael Oldisworth
