= Slanning baronets =

Extinct baronetcy in the Baronetage of England

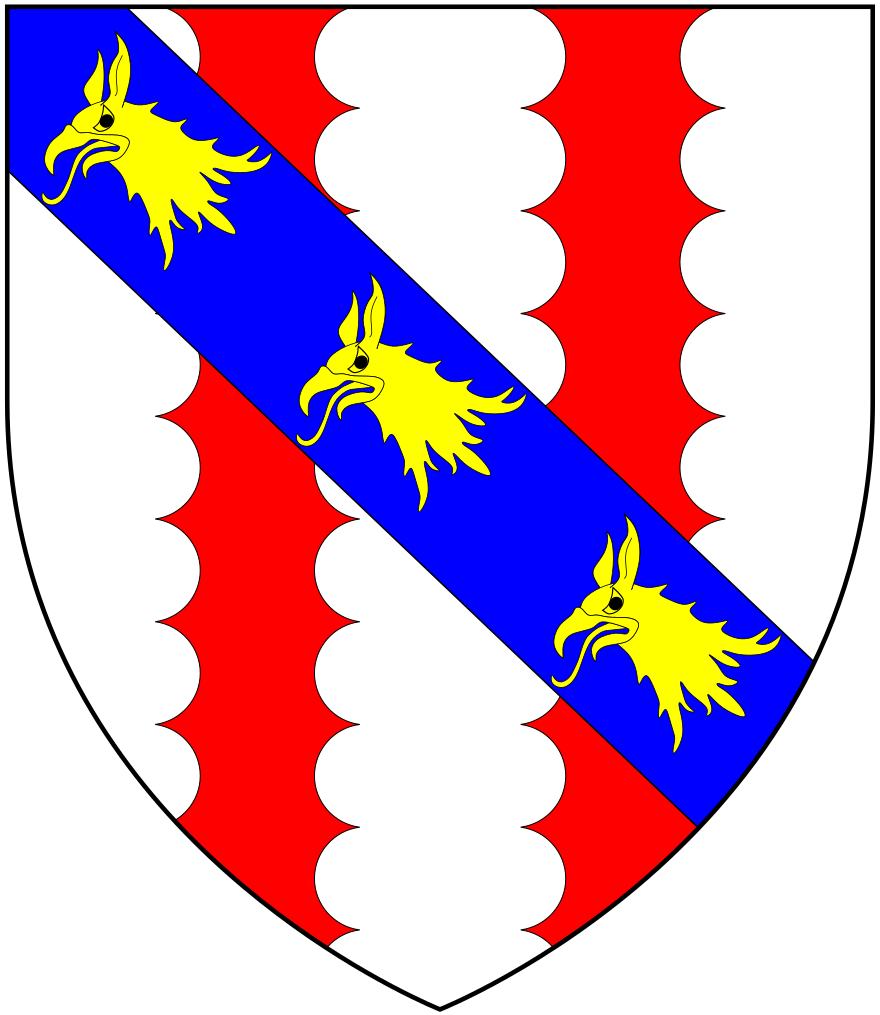
Arms of Slanning: Argent, two pales engrailed gules over all on a bend azure three griffin's heads or

The Slanning Baronetcy, of Maristow in the County of Devon, was a title in the Baronetage of England.

== History ==
It was created on 19 January 1663 for Nicholas Slanning, of Maristow in the parish of Tamerton Foliot, Devon, later member of parliament for Plympton Erle and Penrhyn. He was the son of Nicholas Slanning. The title became extinct on the murder of the second Baronet in 1700.

== Slanning baronets, of Maristow (1663) ==
- Sir Nicholas Slanning, 1st Baronet (1643–c. 1691)
- Sir Andrew Slanning, 2nd Baronet (c. 1674–1700)
