= Henry Hatsell =

Henry Hatsell (died 1667) was an English naval official and member of parliament in the seventeenth century.

Henry was probably born in Plymouth to a family of merchants. He married Margaret Dawe at Barnstaple on 6 February 1637. Together they had at least one son, Sir Henry Hatsell (1641 – 1714).

Hatsell had a business arrangement with Martin Noell and Thomas Alderne, London businessmen, in the transportation of Royalist prisoners involved in the Penruddock uprising. They were shipped to Barbados, where they were sold as goods and chattels for fifteen hundred and fifty pounds of sugar each on 7 May 1656.

Parliament of England
Preceded by George Monck John Carew; Thomas Saunders; Christopher Martyn; James Erisey, Francis Rous Richard Sweet	Member of Parliament for Devon; 1654–1659; With: Sir John Northcote, Bt 1654–1659; Arthur Upton 1654–1656; Thomas Reynell 1654–1656; Robert Rolle 1654–1656; William Morice 1654–1656; John Hale 1654– 1656; Thomas Saunders 1654–1656; William Bastard 1654; William Fry 1654; John Quick 1654; Sir John Yonge 1656; Edmund Fowell 1656; John Doddridge 1656	Succeeded by Not represented in Restored Rump
Preceded by Not represented in Second Protectorate Parliament	Member of Parliament for Tavistock; 1659; With: Edmund Fowell	Succeeded by Not represented in restored Rump
