= John Hale (Roundhead) =

English politician

John Hale (1614–1691) was an English politician who sat in the House of Commons between 1654 and 1660. He fought in the Parliamentary army in the English Civil War.

Hale was the eldest son of John Hale, grocer of Soper Lane, London and Harmer Green, Welwyn, Hertfordshire and his wife Elizabeth Browne, daughter of Humphrey Browne of Essex. He was baptised on 19 March 1614 and was six when he succeeded to the family estates on the death of his father in 1620. In 1643 and 1643 he was colonel of foot in the Parliamentary army.

In 1654, Hale was elected Member of Parliament for Devon in the First Protectorate Parliament. Receiver of tithe, Devon and Cornw. 1655; j.p. Devon 1656-65, He was re-elected MP for Devon in 1656 for the Second Protectorate Parliament. He was commissioner for assessment in 1657. In 1659 he was elected MP for Dartmouth in the Third Protectorate Parliament. He was commissioner for militia in 1659.

Hale was commissioner for assessment from January 1660 to 1680, commissioner for militia in March 1660 and major in the militia horse in April 1660. In April 1660 he was re-elected MP for Dartmouth in the Convention Parliament. He was commissioner for inquiry into Newfoundland government in 1667 and JP for Devon from 1667 to 1670 and from Devon from 1673 to 1676.

Hale married by 1634, Anne Halswell, daughter of Robert Halswell of Goathurst, Somerset and had three sons and a daughter.

Parliament of England
Preceded by George Monck John Carew; Thomas Saunders; Christopher Martyn; James Erisey, Francis Rous Richard Sweet	Member of Parliament for Devon; 1654–1656; With: Sir John Northcote, Bt 1654–1656; Arthur Upton 1654–1656; Robert Rolle 1654–1656; William Morice 1654–1656; Thomas Reynell 1654–1656; Thomas Saunders 1654–1656; Henry Hatsell 1654–1656; William Bastard 1654; William Fry 1654; John Quick 1654; Sir John Yonge 1656; Edmund Fowell 1656; John Doddridge 1656	Succeeded by Sir John Northcote, Bt; Robert Rolle
