= John Russell (Royalist) =

English soldier and politician

The Honourable John Russell
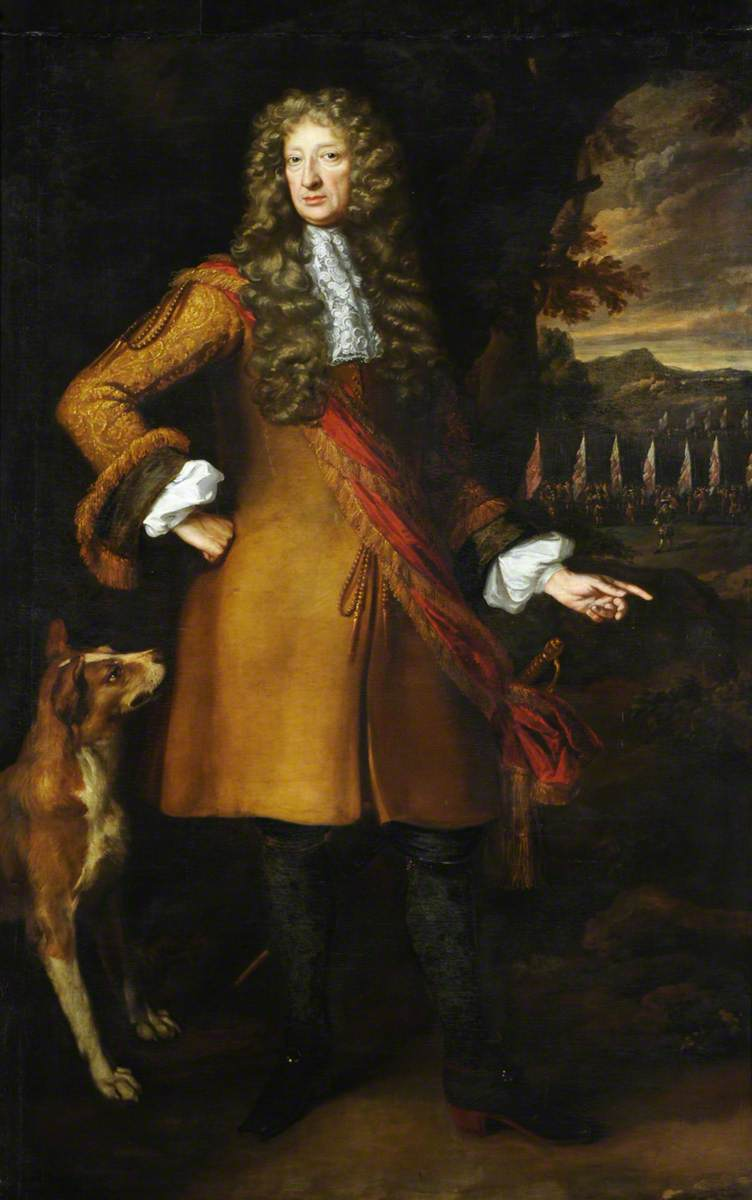

Member of the Long Parliament for Tavistock
- In office 1641–1644

Personal details
- Born: 1620
- Died: 1687 (aged 66–67)
- Parents: Francis Russell, 4th Earl of Bedford; Catherine Brydges

Military service
- Rank: Colonel
- Commands: 1st Regiment of Foot Guards

John Russell (1620–1687) was an English soldier and politician who sat in the House of Commons from 1641 to 1644. He fought in the Royalist army during the English Civil War.

== Life and career ==
Russell was the third son of Francis Russell, 4th Earl of Bedford, known as the "wise earl", and his wife Catherine Brydges, daughter of Giles Brydges, 3rd Baron Chandos. He was a wealthy man, with estates at Shingay in Cambridgeshire.

In 1641, Russell was elected Member of Parliament for Tavistock in the Long Parliament after his brother William inherited the peerage. Russell served in the King's army and was a member of the Sealed Knot.

The family had divided loyalties during the Civil War. His father had been a champion of the parliamentary cause, and his brother changed sides twice. He had many aristocratic equally vacillating connections among his brothers-in-law – the Parliamentarians Lord Brooke and Lord Grey of Wark, the turncoat Earl of Carlisle, and the Royalists Lord Bristol and Lord Newport of High Ercall. Russell commanded Prince Rupert's blue-coated regiment of foot, and was disabled from sitting in parliament in 1644. He was prominent at the storming of Leicester in May 1645, was wounded at Naseby and was in the Oxford garrison before its surrender.

After the Restoration, Russell was commissioned colonel and captain of John Russell's Regiment of Guards, which became incorporated into the 1st Regiment of Foot Guards (later the Grenadier Guards). He commanded the regiment until 1681. He enjoyed dress, dance and music, although his taste belonged to the fashion of an earlier generation.

Parliament of England
| Preceded by John Pym; Lord Russell | Member of Parliament for Tavistock; 1641–1644; With: John Pym 1641–1643 | Succeeded by Elisha Crimes; Edmund Fowell |
Military offices
| New regiment | Colonel of the 1st Regiment of Foot Guards; 1660–1681 | Succeeded by The Duke of Grafton |
