= Hele baronets =

Extinct baronetcy in the Baronetage of England

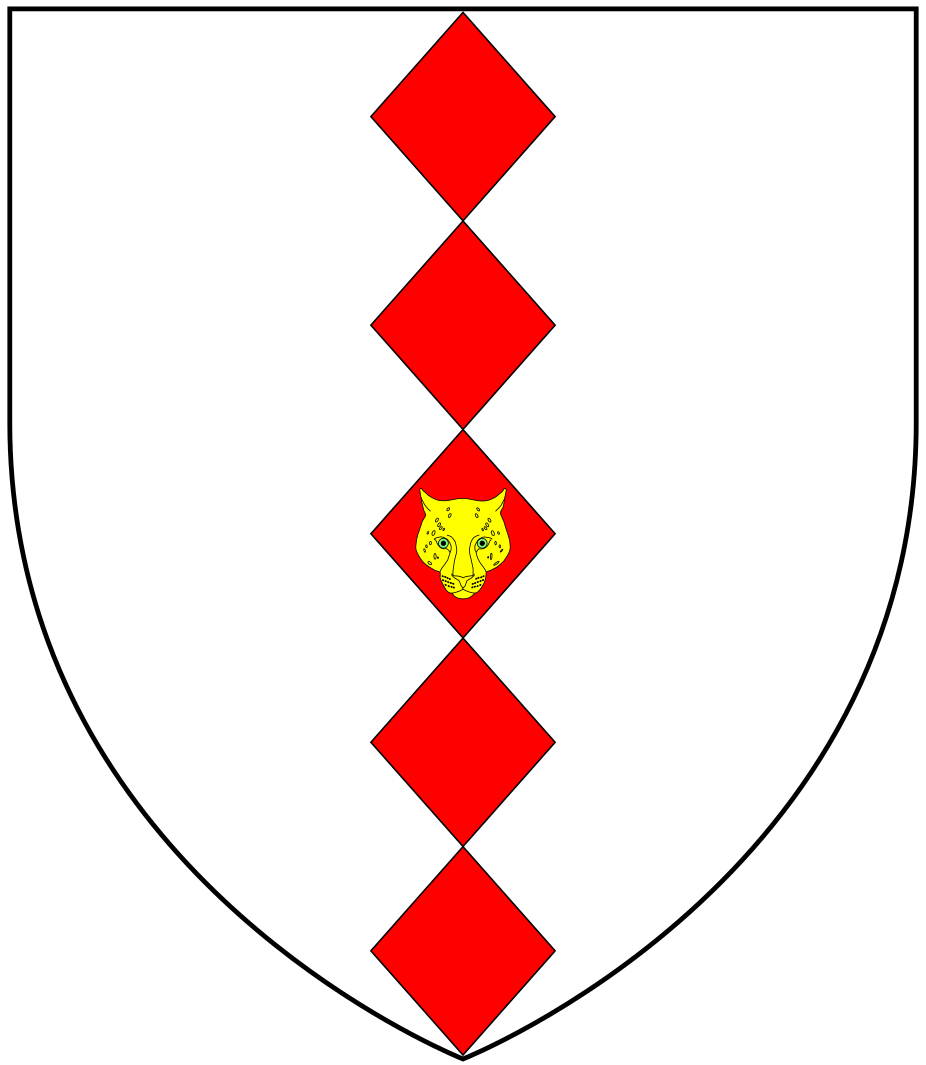
Arms of Hele: Argent, five fusils in pale gules on the middle one a leopard's face or

The Hele Baronetcy, of Flete House in the County of Devon, was a title in the Baronetage of England. It was created on 28 May 1627 for Thomas Hele, Member of Parliament for Plympton Erle and Okehampton. The title became extinct on the death of the third Baronet in 1677.

The Manor of Fleet passed to the third Baronet's cousin, Richard Hele. On the death of his great-grandson, James Modyford Hele in 1716, this branch of the family became extinct. There is a memorial to the Hele family in Holbeton church, Fleet.

== Hele baronets, of Fleet (1627) ==
- Sir Thomas Hele, 1st Baronet (c. 1595–1670)
- Sir Samuel Hele, 2nd Baronet (died 1672)
- Sir Henry Hele, 3rd Baronet (died 1677)
