= Sir Thomas Hele, 1st Baronet =

Sir Thomas Hele, 1st Baronet JP
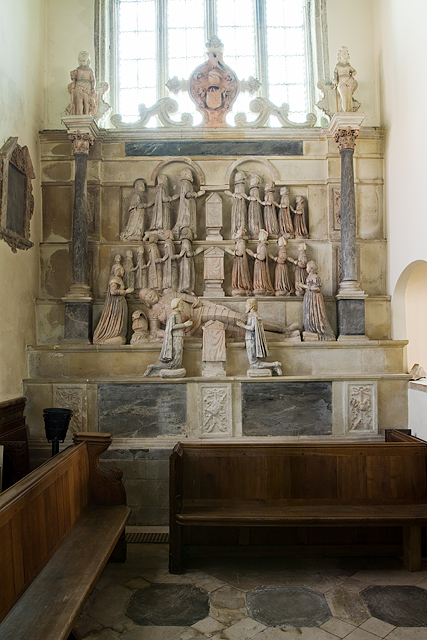
- Hele's monument Flete Chapel, All Saints Holbeton

Member of Parliament for Okehampton
- In office May 1661 – November 1670 †

Deputy Lord Lieutenant of Devon
- In office April 1661 – November 1670 †

Member of Parliament for Plympton Erle
- In office November 1640 – January 1644 (excluded)

High Sheriff of Devon
- In office January 1636 – November 1636

Personal details
- Born: c. 1595 Flete House
- Died: 7 November 1670 (aged 75) Holbeton
- Resting place: All Saints Holbeton
- Spouse(s): (1) Penelope Jackson (1629-1630) (2) Elizabeth Elwes (1632-1646)
- Children: (1) Thomas Hele (1630–1665) (2) Samuel (1634-1672), Henry (1636-1677), Elizabeth (1638-1691) and Honor (1639-1710)
- Occupation: Landowner and politician

Military service
- Allegiance: Royalist
- Years of service: 1642 to 1646
- Rank: Colonel
- Battles/wars: First English Civil War; Siege of Plymouth

Sir Thomas Hele, 1st Baronet (c. 1595 to 7 November 1670) was a landowner from Devon and MP on various occasions from 1626 to 1670. A Royalist during the 1642 to 1646 First English Civil War, he raised a regiment of cavalry which served in the West Country and sat in the Oxford Parliament.

Heavily fined by the Committee for Compounding with Delinquents, he avoided participation in politics during the Interregnum and after the Stuart Restoration in May 1660 was elected to the Cavalier Parliament. He died at home in Holbeton on 7 November 1670.

== Personal details ==
Thomas Hele was the second surviving son of Thomas Hele (1568-1624) and Bridget Champernowne, 4th daughter of Sir Henry Champernowne (1538–1570) of Modbury in Devon. He became heir when his father disinherited his eldest son Samwell (1590-1661).

In 1629, he married Penelope Jackson (?-1630), who died in childbirth the next year, leaving him a son Thomas Hele (1630–1665). Elizabeth Elwes (?-1646)became his second wife in 1632 and they had nine children, only four of whom survived into adulthood; Samuel (1634-1672), Henry (1636-1677), Elizabeth (1638-1691) and Honor (1639-1710).

== Career ==
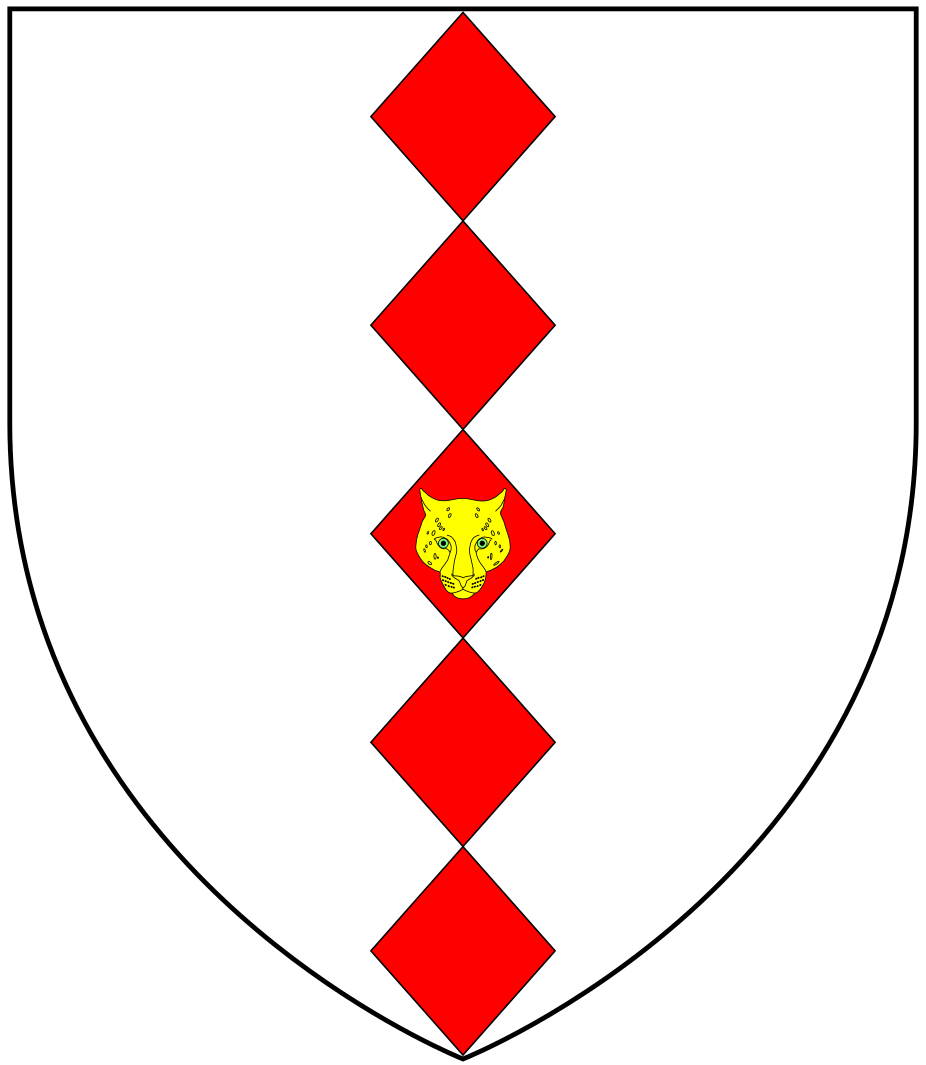
Arms of Hele: Argent, five fusils in pale gules on the middle one a leopard's face or

In 1626 Hele was elected Member of Parliament for Plympton Erle. He was created Baronet of Fleet in the County of Devon in the Baronetage of England on 28 May 1627. He was re-elected in 1628 and sat until Parliament was dissolved in 1629, ushering in the eleven years of Personal Rule.

Following the death of the previous incumbent, he was appointed Sheriff of Devon in January 1636, making him responsible for collecting Ship Money. He was elected for Plympton to the Short Parliament in April 1640, then the Long Parliament in November.

When the First English Civil War began in August 1642, Hele supported Charles I; he sat in the Oxford Parliament and was excluded from his Parliamentary seat in January 1644. He also raised a regiment of cavalry, taking part in the Siege of Plymouth and defence of Pendennis Castle. He was heavily fined by the Committee for Compounding with Delinquents in 1646 and largely avoided participation in Royalist conspiracies during the Interregnum. Following the Stuart Restoration, he was elected for Okehampton in the Cavalier Parliament and held the seat until his death in 1670.

Hele was buried in All Saints' Church, Holbeton, on 16 November 1670. His elaborate monument survives in the Fleet Chapel, at the east end of the north aisle of the church. (Note: The monument has four tiers, populated by effigies of 22 people, all members of the Hele family. On the lowest tier kneel Sir Thomas's two sons, facing each other over a prie-dieu. On the tier above lies the semi-recumbent figure of Sir Thomas Hele, dressed in full armour, excepting helm which rests by his shoulder. His two daughters kneel watching him in prayer, one at his head, the other at his feet. On the tier above him kneel a man and his wife, either side of a prie-dieu, the man on the left, his wife on the right. Behind the man are his five sons kneeling, behind the woman three daughters. On the top tier the arrangement is repeated, with two sons behind the man and four daughters behind the wife. The two uppermost tiers are thought to represent the family of sir Thomas's father and grandfather. On top of the monument is an escutcheon showing the arms of Hele (very worn). There is no inscription on the monument, but it is probable that the effigies represent Thomas Hele of Exeter, Thomas Hele of Fleet (his son), and his son Sir Thomas Hele who was the first baronet of the family. There is the Red hand of Ulster badge of a baronet in the arms which probably applies to Sir Thomas, the first baronet, but the style is earlier.)

== Sources ==
- Burke, John; Burke, Bernard (1838). A genealogical and heraldic history of the extinct and dormant baronetcies of England. Scott, Webster & Gearn.
- Ferris, John P; Hunneyball, Paul (2010). HELE, Thomas (c.1595-1670), of Flete Damarell, Holbeton, Devon in The History of Parliament: the House of Commons 1604-1629. Boydell & Brewer.
- Vivian, John, ed. (1895). The Visitations of the County of Devon: Comprising the Heralds' Visitations of 1531, 1564 & 1620. Exeter.

Parliament of England
Preceded by Sir Warwick Hele; Sir William Stroud	Member of Parliament for Plympton Erle; 1626–1629; With: Sir William Stroud; Sir James Bragge	Parliament suspended until 1640
Parliament suspended since 1629	Member of Parliament for Plympton Erle; 1640–1644; With: Richard Strode 1640; Sir Nicholas Slanning 1640; Hugh Potter 1640–1644	Succeeded by Christopher Martyn; Hugh Potter
Preceded by Edward Wise; Josias Calmady	Member of Parliament for Okehampton; 1661–1670; With: Edward Wise	Succeeded by Edward Wise; Sir Arthur Harris, Bt
Baronetage of England
New creation	Baronet (of Fleet); 1627–1670	Succeeded by Samuel Hele
