= William Stawell (MP) =

William Stawell (c. 1651-1702), of Parke, Bovey Tracey, Devon, was an English Member of Parliament (MP).

He was a Member of the Parliament of England for Ashburton 9 March 1677, March 1679, 1681, 1685, 1690, 1695, 1698, February 1701, December 1701 - 18 June 1702.
