= Thomas Hele (died 1665) =

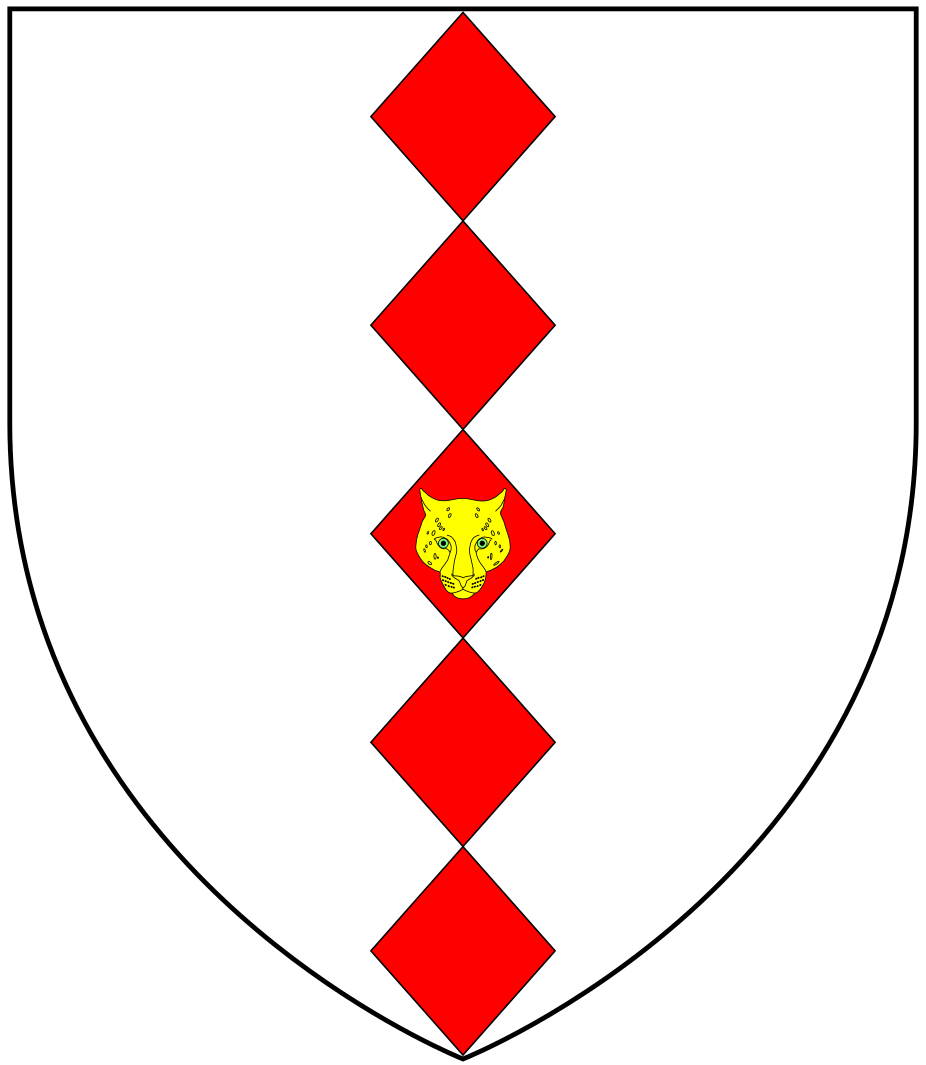
Arms of Hele: Argent, five fusils in pale gules on the middle one a leopard's face or

Thomas Hele (6 September 1630 – 13 September 1665) of Wigborow, Somerset, was a Member of Parliament for Plympton Erle in Devon from 1661 to 1665.

== Origins ==
Hele was the eldest son and heir apparent of Sir Thomas Hele, 1st Baronet (died 1670), of Flete, Holbeton in Devon, by his first wife Penelope Johnson, daughter and co-heiress of Emorbe (Eniorbe(?)) Johnson of Wigborow in Somerset.

== Career ==
In 1661 he was elected Member of Parliament for Plympton Erle in the Cavalier Parliament. He was commissioner for assessment for Devon from 1661 and for Somerset from 1665.

== Marriage ==
Thomas married Amy Luttrell, a daughter of Thomas Luttrell of Dunster Castle, Somerset, but left no children.

== Death and burial ==
He predeceased his father and died at Wigborough at the age of 35 and was buried at South Petherton. His monument survives in Holbeton Church.

Parliament of England
Preceded by Christopher Martyn; William Strode	Member of Parliament for Plympton Erle; 1661–1665; With: William Strode	Succeeded by William Strode
