= Chalmington =

Hamlet in Dorset, England

Coordinates: 50.807°N 2.577°W

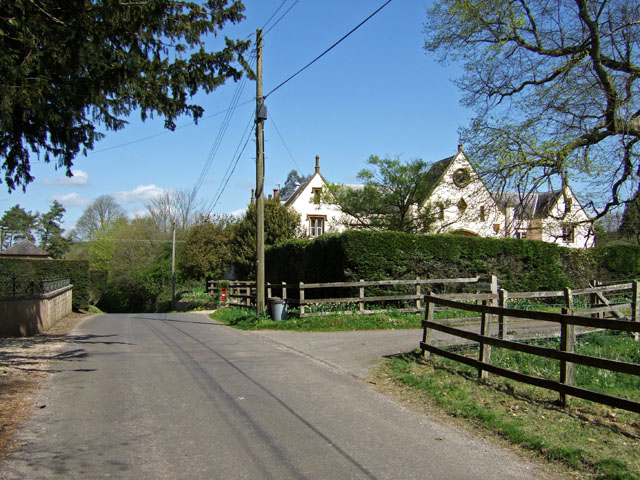
- The former Stables for the manor house in Chalmington

- Location within Dorset
- OS grid reference: ST5900
- Unitary authority: Dorset
- Ceremonial county: Dorset
- Region: South West
- Country: England
- Sovereign state: United Kingdom

Chalmington is a small hamlet close to the village of Cattistock, in west Dorset, England.
