= Sir Nicholas Slanning, 1st Baronet =

English courtier and politician

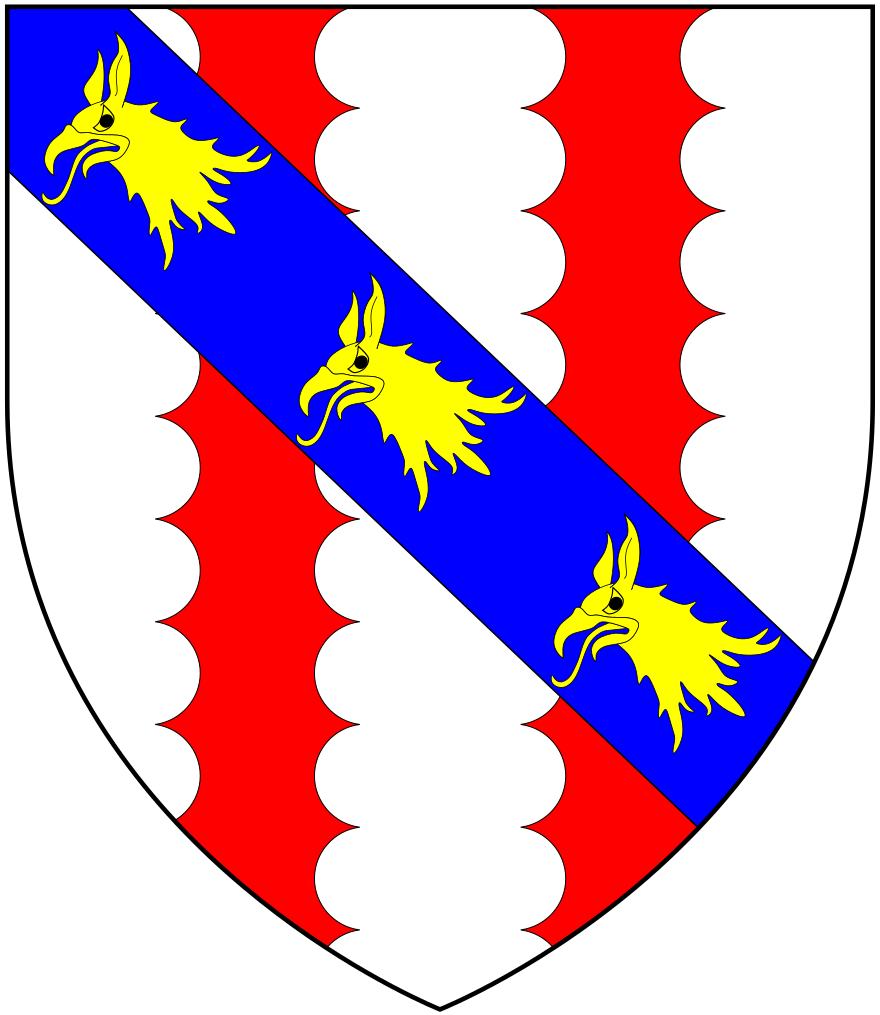
Arms of Slanning: Argent, two pales engrailed gules over all on a bend azure three griffin's heads or

Sir Nicholas Slanning, 1st Baronet FRS (June 1643 – April 1691) of Maristow in the parish of Tamerton Foliot, Devon, was an English courtier and politician who sat in the House of Commons between 1667 and 1689.

== Life ==
Slanning was the eldest son of Sir Nicholas Slanning and his wife Gertrude (née Bagge), daughter of Sir James Bagge. His father was killed in 1643 fighting for the Royalist cause in the Civil War. His mother remarried Richard Arundell, 1st Baron Arundell of Trerice.

After the Restoration of Charles II Slanning was knighted in 1661 and made a baronet in 1663. His first marriage to the influential Cartaret family brought him for a time into the inner Court circle. He was appointed Cupbearer to Queen Catherine of Braganza (1663) and Commissioner for Assessment for Cornwall (1661–1678), Devon (1661–1662, 1665–1680). He was elected a Fellow of the Royal Society in 1664. Like his father, he had some interest in chemistry.

In 1669, Slanning was elected Member of Parliament for Plympton Erle in the Cavalier Parliament. He was a diligent MP, sitting on some 70 committees. He was elected MP for Penrhyn in 1679 and in 1681 and 1685. He was expelled from the Royal Society in 1682. He was appointed Standard-bearer to the Band of Gentleman-pensioners (1676–1684), Commissioner for Rebels' Estates, Devon (1686), Vice-Warden of the Stannaries (1686-death) and Deputy-Governor of Plymouth (1688). He was Commissioner for Assessment for Cornwall and Devon from 1689 to 1690. He supported the Glorious Revolution, but retired from politics the following year.

Slanning died in Tamerton Foliot, Devon in 1691.

== Family ==
Slanning married four times: firstly in 1662 Anne (died 1668), daughter of Sir George Carteret, Bt, of St Owen's, Jersey, Treasurer of the Navy and his wife Elizabeth. Anne was remembered as a "pious and sweet-tempered lady": Samuel Pepys refers to her affectionately in his celebrated Diary. He married secondly in 1670 Mary, daughter of James Jenkin of Treseny, St Columb Major, Cornwall, and thirdly in 1673 Mary, daughter of Sir Andrew Henley, 1st Baronet, of Henley, Somerset, and his first wife Mary Gayer. Mary Henley was the mother of his only son, Andrew. He married fourthly in 1679 Amy, widow of Sir John Davie, 2nd Baronet, and also of Walter Hele of Newton Ferrers, and daughter of Edmond Parker of Boringdon Hall, Plympton, Devon.

His only son, Sir Andrew Slanning, inherited his title. Andrew was murdered by John Cowland in 1700, following a drunken brawl in the Rose Tavern, Convent Garden, and the title died with him. The Slanning estates passed to the heirs of Sir Nicholas's sister Elizabeth, Lady Modyford.

Parliament of England
Preceded by Sir Edmund Fortescue; Sir William Strode	Member of Parliament for Plympton Erle; 1667–1679; With: Sir William Strode; Sir George Treby	Succeeded by Richard Hillersdon; George Treby
Preceded by Sir Robert Southwell; Francis Trefusis	Member of Parliament for Penryn; 1679–1689; With: Charles Smythe 1679–85; Henry Fanshawe 1685–89	Succeeded by Anthony Rowe; Alexander Pendarves
Baronetage of England
New creation	Baronet (of Maristow); 1663–1691	Succeeded by Andrew Slanning
