= Nicholas Slanning =

English politician (1606–1643)

Sir Nicholas Slanning JP
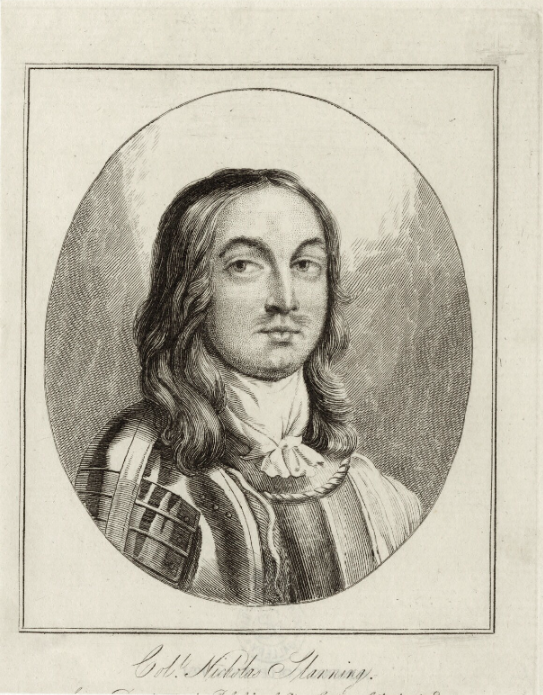
- Portrait of Slanning by unknown artist, early 19th century

Member of Parliament for Penryn
- In office November 1640 – August 1642 (excluded)

Member of Parliament for Plympton Erle
- In office April 1640 – May 1640

Vice Admiral of South Cornwall and Governor of Pendennis Castle
- In office 1635–1643

Personal details
- Born: 1 September 1606 Hele, Devon, England
- Died: 30 July 1643 (aged 36) Bristol, England
- Resting place: Unknown
- Spouse: Gertrude Bagge (1625 – his death)
- Children: Nicholas (1643–1691); Elizabeth (died 1724); Margaret (died 1682)
- Education: Exeter College, Oxford
- Occupation: Landowner and soldier

Military service
- Years of service: 1642 to 1646
- Rank: Colonel
- Battles/wars: Thirty Years War; Bishops' Wars; First English Civil War; Braddock Down; Beacon Hill; Modbury 1643; Sourton Down; Stratton; Lansdown; Roundway Down; Bristol

Sir Nicholas Slanning (1 September 1606 – August 1643) was a soldier and landowner from Devon who sat in the House of Commons from 1640 to 1642. He served in the Royalist army during the First English Civil War and was mortally wounded at Bristol on 26 July 1643.

A member of a wealthy family with extensive estates in Devon and Cornwall, Slanning gained military experience in the Thirty Years' War and was appointed Vice Admiral of South Cornwall and Governor of Pendennis Castle in 1635. He served in the 1639 and 1640 Bishops' Wars and was elected MP for Penryn in the Long Parliament, where he consistently supported Charles I.

Following the outbreak of the Civil War in August 1642, he raised a regiment of infantry from his estates in Cornwall and played a prominent role in the 1643 Western campaign, which ensured Royalist control of South West England. Badly wounded in assaulting Bristol on 26 July, he died three weeks later.

== Personal details ==
Nicholas Slanning was born 1 September 1606 in Hele, Devon, only son of Gamaliel Slanning (1589–1612) and Margaret Marler, his second cousin; they also had an elder daughter, Elizabeth. His father's early death meant at the age of six he inherited substantial estates around Plymouth and Falmouth, including Maristow, Bickleigh, Walkhampton and Roborough.

He married Gertrude Bagge (1614–1691) in 1625 and they had three children, Elizabeth (1630–1734), Margaret (died 1682) and Nicholas (1643–1691). Two years after his death, Gertrude married Richard Arundell, 1st Baron Arundell of Trerice, who served with Slanning during the First English Civil War.

== Career ==
Slanning attended Exeter College, Oxford before entering the Inner Temple in 1628 to acquire the legal training considered essential for members of the gentry at the time. He spent the next three years serving in the Dutch States Army, then considered the best place to learn the 'art of war' due to its success in the Eighty Years' War against Spain. Many officers on both sides during the Wars of the Three Kingdoms did the same, including Sir Thomas Fairfax and George Monck.

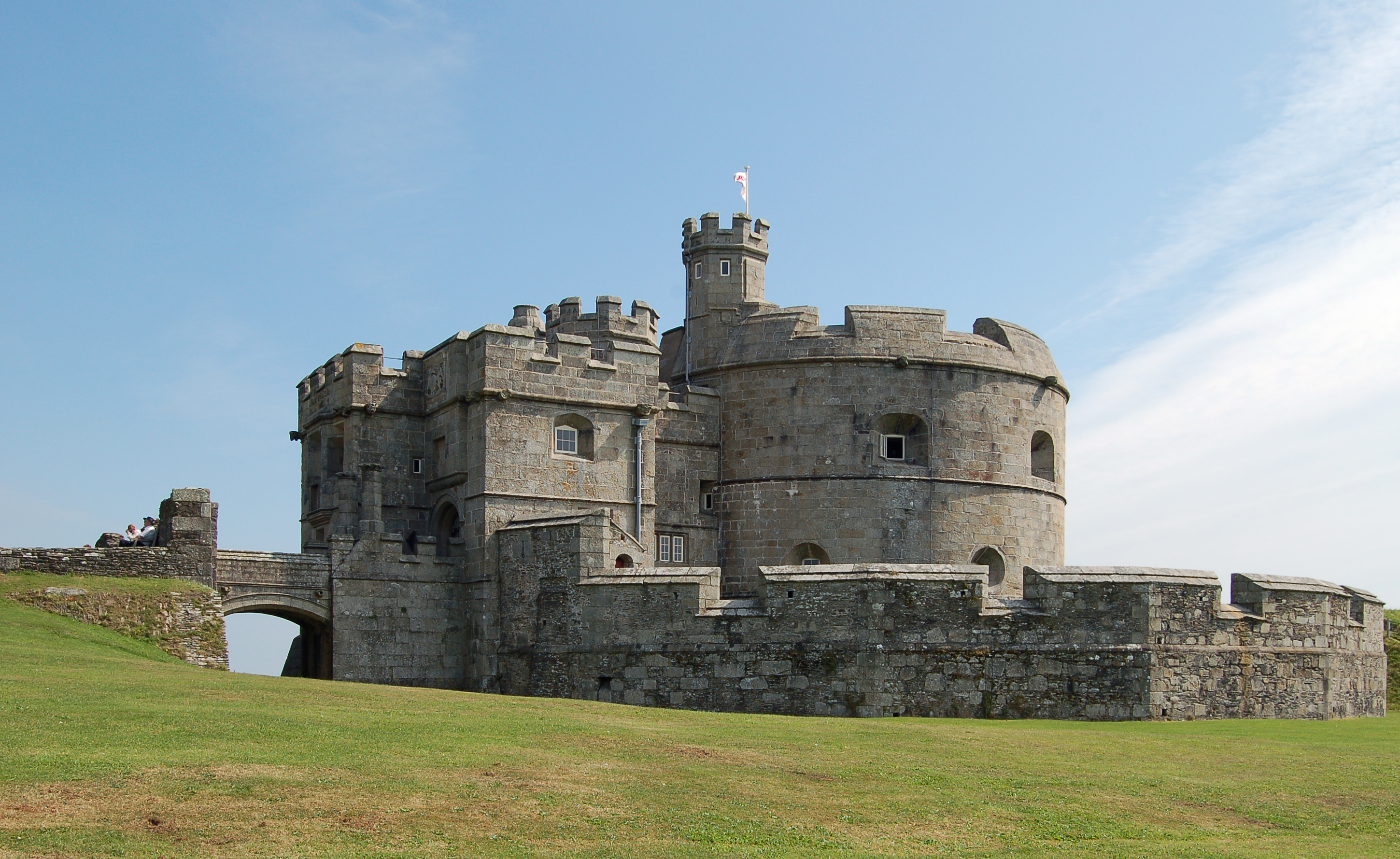
Pendennis Castle; Slanning was Governor 1635 to 1643

After returning to England, Slanning was knighted on 24 August 1632 at Nonsuch Palace. He was appointed to the Commission for Piracy in Devon and Cornwall, Vice-Admiral of Cornwall and Governor of Pendennis Castle, a relatively modern fortification constructed by Henry VIII that guarded the entrance to Falmouth harbour. These were important positions, since the port was commonly used by foreign merchant ships seeking shelter, while Barbary pirates operated in the waters off Land's End.

Shortly before the first of the Bishops' Wars in February 1639, Slanning was ordered to take men and artillery from Pendennis and garrison Carlisle Castle. This was intended to support a Royalist landing from Ulster which failed to take place and instead, Slanning joined the main force in Newcastle. According to Sir Bevil Grenville, he was given command of a company of infantry which served as a bodyguard to Charles I.

Having failed to defeat the Scots, Charles recalled Parliament for the first time since 1629, in order to raise money for another attempt. In April 1640, Slanning was elected to the Short Parliament as MP for Plympton Erle. Charles dissolved it after less than a month and Slanning served in the second Bishops' War, which again ended in defeat. The financial penalties imposed by the Treaty of Ripon could only be paid for by new taxes approved by Parliament, forcing Charles to call new elections.

In November, Slanning was elected for both Plympton Erle and Penryn to the Long Parliament but chose to sit for Penryn. He consistently supported the Crown and in May 1641 was one of the fifty-nine MPs named as "betrayers of their country" for voting against the Bill of Attainder for Strafford. Other MPs who voted against the Bill included Sidney Godolphin, John Trevanion and John Arundel, all of whom would later be killed fighting for the Royalists. He was given permission in June to return to Pendennis Castle but in January 1642 was summoned to attend Parliament for allegedly authorising the arrest of the "Five Members", should they try to embark from a Cornish port, a charge he denied. The majority of Royalist MPs withdrew from Parliament in April and he was certainly in Cornwall on 9 August when he was barred from the Commons as a "delinquent".

== First English Civil War ==
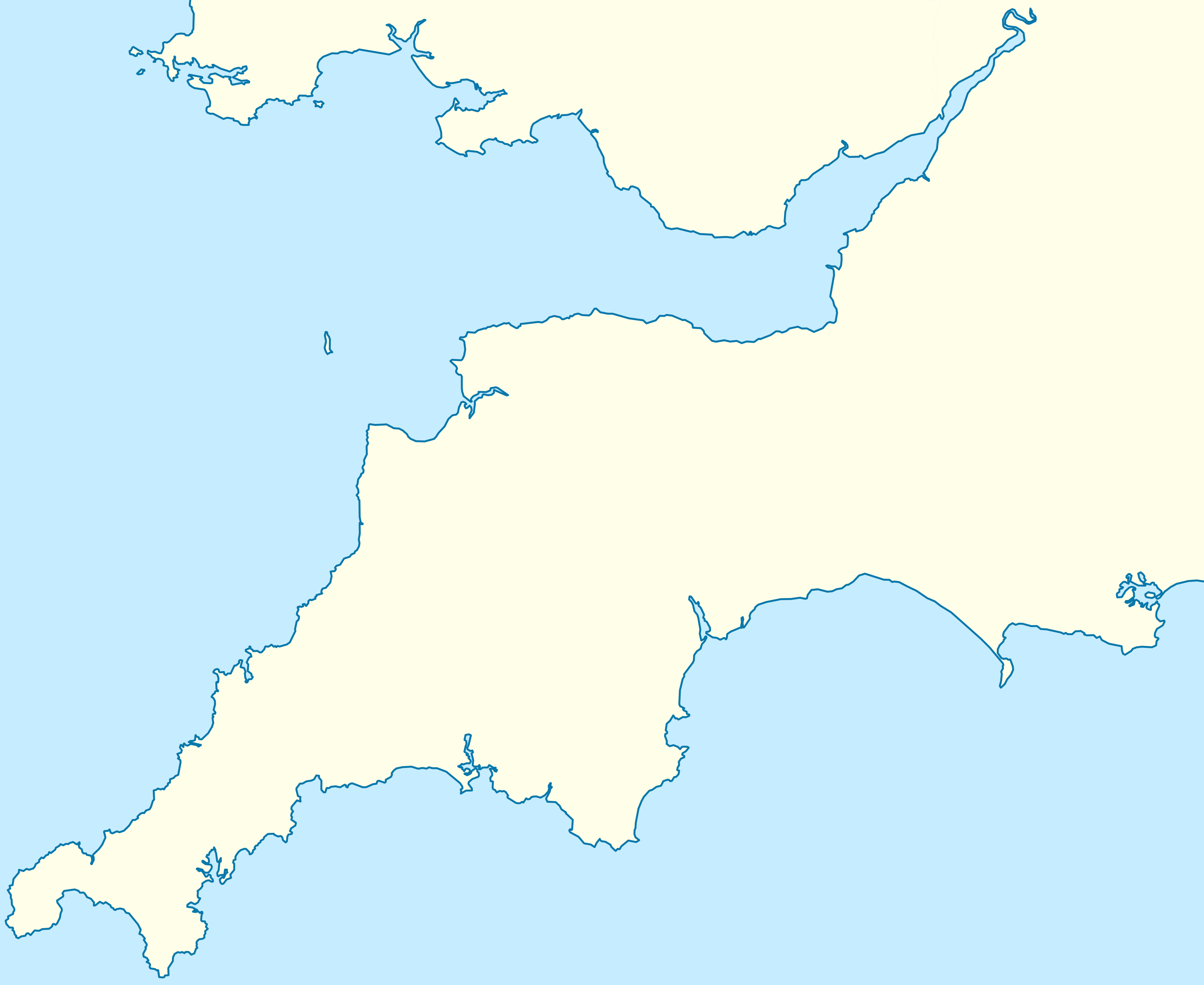
War in the West, 1642 to 1643

As tensions mounted, Slanning used his position in Falmouth to import military supplies for the Royalist cause. When the First English Civil War broke out in August 1642, he began raising troops in Cornwall. He, Grenville, William Godolphin, Trevanion and Warwick Mohun recruited five regiments collectively known as "the Tinners", since many came from local tin mines controlled by Slanning and Godolphin.

Although regarded as some of the best infantry available to the Royalists, the rank and file often had little choice in deciding whether to "volunteer"; Grenville, generally regarded as a benevolent landlord, threatened his tenants and employees with sanctions if they refused to sign up. In addition, while militia on both sides often refused to serve outside their own counties, the Cornish were particularly noted for their reluctance to serve outside Cornwall or under non-Cornish officers, factors which later limited their usefulness.

In October, Slanning relinquished his position as Governor of Pendennis and joined the field army assembled by Sir Ralph Hopton for an unsuccessful attack on Exeter. After victory at Braddock Down in January 1643, Hopton moved against Plymouth but many of the Cornish troops refused to cross the River Tamar into Devon. The Royalists were very short of basic supplies like gunpowder and ammunition and on 21 February were routed by Parliamentarian troops at Modbury; Slanning's regiment suffered over 350 killed, wounded or captured.

The two sides agreed a local truce, an agreement greeted with incredulity by William Waller, Parliamentarian commander in the West. Hopton used the opportunity to reorganise his army, while Slanning brought his unit back up to full strength and they resumed the offensive after the truce ended in April. Although repulsed at Sourton Down on 25 April, the Royalists won a resounding victory at Stratton on 16 May, Slanning and Trevanion commanding the left flank of their attack. Having linked up with Prince Maurice, they advanced into Somerset and defeated Waller first at Landsdowne on 5 July, then Roundway Down eight days later. These victories ensured Royalist control of South West England but the Cornish foot suffered heavy casualties, including Grenville who was killed at Lansdowne.

Recognising an opportunity to capture Bristol, then the second-largest port in England, Prince Rupert left Oxford and on 23 July met up with Prince Maurice and the Western Army outside the city. Early on the morning of 26 July, simultaneous attacks were made by Prince Rupert's men in the north while Prince Maurice assaulted the stronger southern defences. Although the northern attack was successful, the Cornish were repulsed three times and lost over 200 combatants, including many senior officers. Trevanion died of his wounds the same night, Slanning "had his thigh broken with a case shot, whereof he dyed three weeks later".

== Sources ==
- Andriette, Eugene A (1971). Devon and Exeter in the Civil War. David & Charles. ISBN 978-0715352564.
- Barratt, John (2005). The Civil War in the South-West. Pen & Sword Military. ISBN 1-84415-146-8.
- BCW. "Sir Nicholas Slanning's Regiment of Foot". BCW Project.
- Birch, Thomas (1742). State Papers May 1639 in A Collection of the State Papers of John Thurloe, Volume 1, 1638-1653. Fletcher Gyles.
- Burke, John (1831). A general and heraldic dictionary of the peerages of England, Ireland, and Scotland, extinct, dormant, and in abeyance. England. Henry Colburn and Richard Bentley.
- Dunthorne, Hugh (2017). Hermans, Theo; Salverda, Reinier (eds.). The Dutch Revolt in English political culture 1585-1660 in From Revolt to Riches: Culture and History of the Low Countries, 1500–1700. UCL Press. ISBN 978-1910634875.
- Firth, Charles Harding; Leslie, JH (1925). "The Siege and capture of Bristol by Royalist forces in 1643". Journal of the Society for Army Historical Research. 4 (18): 180–203. JSTOR 44227516.
- Harrington, Peter (2007). The Castles of Henry VIII. Osprey Publishing. ISBN 978-1472803801.
- HMSO (1767). 9 August 1642: Journal of the House of Lords: Volume 5, 1642-1643. HMSO.
- Jones, W (1887). Transactions of the Devon Association; Volume 19. W Brendon & Son.
- Royle, Trevor (2004). Civil War: The Wars of the Three Kingdoms 1638–1660. Abacus. ISBN 978-0-349-11564-1.
- Rushworth, John (1721). Historical Collections of Private Passages of State: Volume 4, May 1641. Browne & Son.
- Stoyle, Mark (2002). West Britons: Cornish identities and the early modern British state. University of Exeter Press. ISBN 978-0859896870.
- Tinniswood, Adrian (2013). The Rainborowes. Random House. ISBN 978-1448156443.
- Wolfe, Mary (2004). "Slanning, Sir Nicholas (1606–1643)". Oxford Dictionary of National Biography (online ed.). Oxford University Press. doi:10.1093/ref:odnb/25714. (Subscription, Wikipedia Library access or UK public library membership required.)

Parliament of England
Vacant Parliament suspended since 1629	Member of Parliament for Plympton Erle; 1640 (April); With: Richard Strode; Sir Thomas Hele, 1st Baronet; Michael Oldisworth	Succeeded by Sir Thomas Hele, 1st Baronet; Hugh Potter
Preceded by Sir Richard Vyvyan, 1st Baronet; Joseph Hall	Member of Parliament for Penryn; 1640–1642; With: John Bampfylde	Succeeded by John Bampfylde other seat vacant
