= Martin Noell =

Sir Martin Noell was a 17th-century English merchant, engaged in an extensive colonial trade that included the slave trade. He thrived under the Commonwealth as a tax farmer, taking up farms of the excise or customs and advancing other sums, secure in the knowledge that he would get his money back. At the Restoration of Charles II (1660) Noell was one of the four eminent London merchants— the others being Thomas Povey, Sir Nicholas Crispe and Sir Andrew Riccard— who took their seats among the courtiers on the Council for Plantations, whose restrictions on colonial trade in the interests of a mercantilist policy were resisted from the first by Virginia planters. He was knighted in 1662.
