= John Pollexfen =

British nobleman (1636–1715)

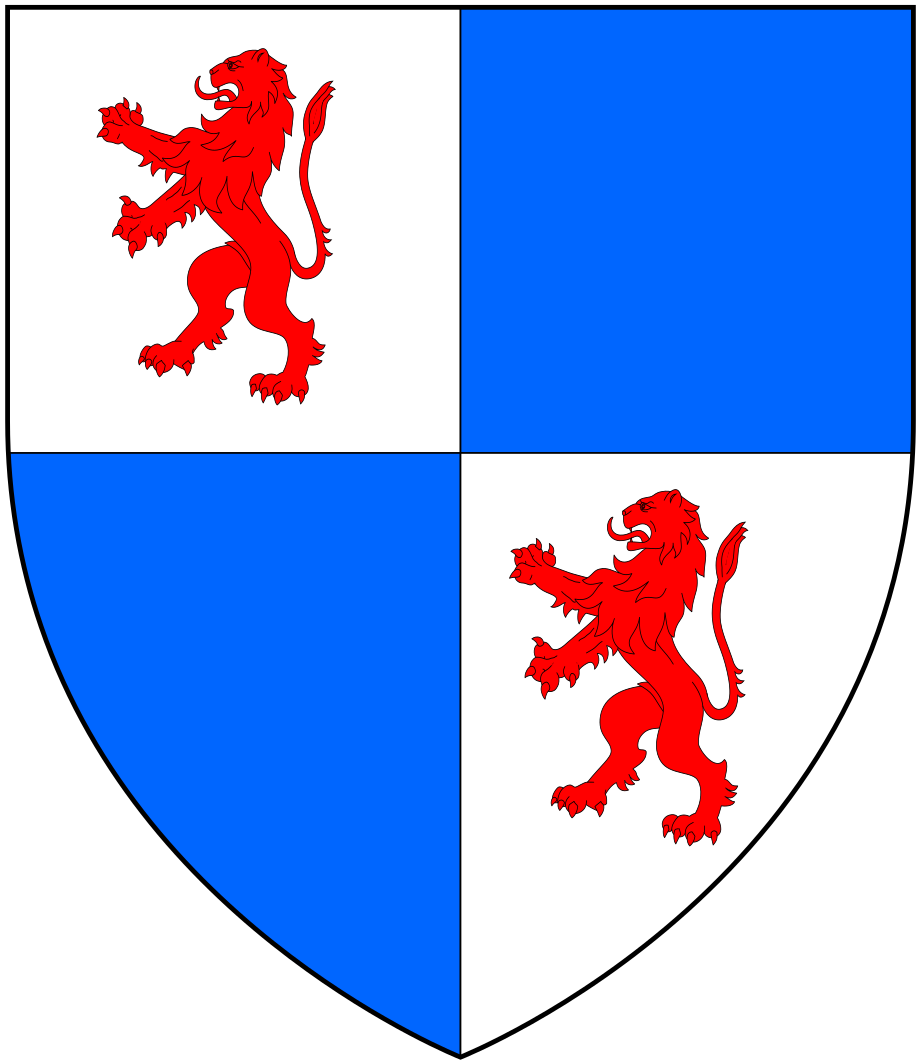
- Arms of Pollexfen: Quarterly argent and azure, in the 1 and 4 quarter a lion rampant gules

Member of Parliament for Plympton Erle
- In office 1679; 1689; 1690-1695

Personal details
- Born: 1636
- Died: February 1715 (aged 78–79)
- Spouse: Mary Lawrence (m. 1670)
- Children: 4
- Relatives: Henry Pollexfen (brother)

John Pollexfen (1636–1715), of Walbrooke House in the parish of St Stephen Walbrook, City of London and of Wembury House in Devon, was a merchant, a courtier to Kings Charles II and William III, and a political economist who served four times as a Member of Parliament for Plympton Erle in Devon, in 1679, 1681, 1689 and 1690. He was opposed to the monopoly of the East India Company.

== Origins ==
The received affiliation, re-stated by Lady Eliott-Drake in 1911, makes John the second son of Andrew Pollexfen (died 1670) of Stancombe Dawney in the parish of Sherford, Devon, by his wife Joan Woollcombe (born 1607). John's elder brother was Henry Pollexfen (1632-1691), of Nutwell in the parish of Woodbury, Devon, Lord Chief Justice of the Common Pleas 1689-1691. Andrew, the father, was a younger grandson of John Pollexfen of Kitley in the parish of Yealmpton in Devon: their mother, Joan, was a daughter of John Woollcombe (born 1577) (anciently "Woollocombe") of Pitton, also in Yealmpton, great-grandfather of John Woolcombe (d.1713), MP for Plymouth in 1702. Joan's sister Phillippa Woolcombe married Henry Treby, and was grandmother of the attorney George Treby, with whom John Pollexfen was long associated.

For his Heraldic Visitations of Devon (1895), Lt.-Col. J.L. Vivian reconstructed a different parentage for John and his brethren from the reading of various wills. This appears unreliable and has not been accepted.

== Career ==
John's elder brother Henry inherited the family estates, which led to strained relations between the brothers. John's early career as a London merchant began with trading in wines from the Iberian Peninsula, leading to a summons to the Treasury on 28 March 1677 to report on Portuguese wines. He was sufficiently successful that in 1668 he built for himself Walbrooke House, a mansion in the City parish of St Stephen Walbrook, and in 1686 he purchased the manor of Wembury. In 1675 he served on the Committee on Trade and Plantations. He received an appointment in 1678 to the Privy Chamber, which he held until 1685; re-appointed in 1690, he remained until 1702. He was appointed to the Commission for Preventing the Export of Wool in 1689, resigning in 1692.

Following an electoral battle between Richard Strode (1638-1707) (for the Court party) and George Treby (for the Exclusionists), Treby brought in Pollexfen as a Member of Parliament for Plympton Erle in Devon in October 1679, and again for the Parliaments of 1681, 1689 and 1690. He was active on various economic affairs committees, helping pass the Tobacco Act and renew the charter of the East India Company. He was made a Justice of the Peace for Devon in 1689 and an honorary trustee of the National Land Bank. His most significant appointment was as a member of the Board of Trade from 1696 until 23 April 1709, where he was a colleague of John Locke. While there he participated in the recoinage debate, produced a report on the judicial system of Barbados and advocated a unified military command for the American colonies.

In 1677 he served on a special commission relating to the East India Company, accusing the directors of monopolising the trade, through jobbery and refusal to issue new stock: he also condemned the export of gold bullion, which he saw as suppressing domestic production and employment. In 1684, his brother Henry Pollexfen defended Captain Thomas Sands in the celebrated monopoly case brought against him by the East India Company (East India Company v Sandys) for independent trading. Mindful of his arguments (although Judge Jeffreys had awarded judgement for the Company), in the altered political climate John Pollexfen lobbied the House of Commons in 1689 to establish a new, national company, and presented written and oral testimony to the House of Lords in 1696 showing the harmful effects of importing Indian-manufactured goods and exporting bullion. In response the Lords and Commons opened up the trade lanes to India, establishing a well-regulated company to manage this.

Drawing from his advocacy in these issues, Pollexfen published a series of political and economic essays. After Charles Davenant published his An Essay on the East India Trade in 1697, Pollexfen responded with his essay England and East India Inconsistent in their Manufactures, and also published A Discourse of Trade and Coyn dated 15 July 1696, an extended version of which was republished to counter William Lowndes's proposal of recoinage. In connection with the Great Recoinage of 1696 and the activities of the East India Company, his arguments were closely considered by Sir Isaac Newton, who, while holding more positive views upon paper credit than Pollexfen, described him as a "most able member" of the Council of Trade. In 1699 he published A Vindication of some Assertions Relating to Coin and Trade, and a year later republished Of Trade.

He served as a Gentleman of the Privy Chamber 1678-85 (to King Charles II) and 1690-1702 (to King William III).

== Marriage ==
In 1670, aged 32, he married Mary Lawrence, a daughter of Sir John Lawrence, of the parish of Great St Helens, City of London, a member of the Worshipful Company of Haberdashers, by whom he had issue 2 sons and 2 daughters.

== Death ==
He died shortly before 15 February 1715 and was buried at St Stephen Walbrook in the City of London.

== Sources ==
- Crossette, J.S., biography of Pollexfen, John (c.1638–1715), of Walbrook House, London and Wembury, Devon, published in History of Parliament: the House of Commons 1660–1690, ed. B.D. Henning, 1983
- Eliott-Drake, Elizabeth (Lady Eliott-Drake) (1840-1923) (née Douglas, a daughter of Sir Robert Andrews Douglas, 2nd Baronet of Glenbervie and wife of Sir Francis George Augustus Fuller-Eliott-Drake, 2nd Baronet (1837–1916) of Nutwell Court and Buckland Monachorum), Family and Heirs of Sir Francis Drake, Vol. II, London, 1911, pp. 55–9 ;

Parliament of England
Preceded by Richard Hillersdon; Sir George Treby	Member of Parliament for Plympton Erle; 1679; With: Sir George Treby	Succeeded by Richard Strode sir Christopher Wren
Preceded by Sir Christopher Wren; Richard Strode	Member of Parliament for Plympton Erle; 1689; With: Sir George Treby	Succeeded by George Parker; Richard Strode
Preceded by George Parker; Richard Strode	Member of Parliament for Plympton Erle; 1690–1695; With: Sir George Treby to 1692; Thomas Trevor from 1692	Succeeded by Courtenay Croker; Thomas Trevor
