= Thomas Sandys =

Thomas Sandys may refer to:

- Thomas Sandys, 2nd Baron Sandys (died 1560), English peer
- Thomas Sandys (Gatton MP) (1600–1658), English MP
- Thomas Sandys (merchant) (fl. 1682-1684), English merchant
- Thomas Sandys (Conservative politician) (1837–1911), East India Company and British Army officer and MP for Bootle

== See also ==
- Sandys (surname)
- Thomas Sands (disambiguation)
