= George Treby (judge) =

English justice of the peace

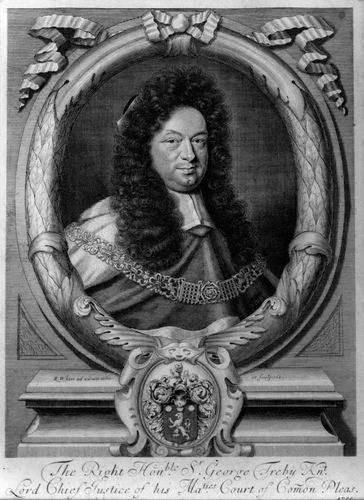
Sir George Treby (1643–1700), engraving dated 1700 by Robert White (1645–1703). National Portrait Gallery, London, NPG 638

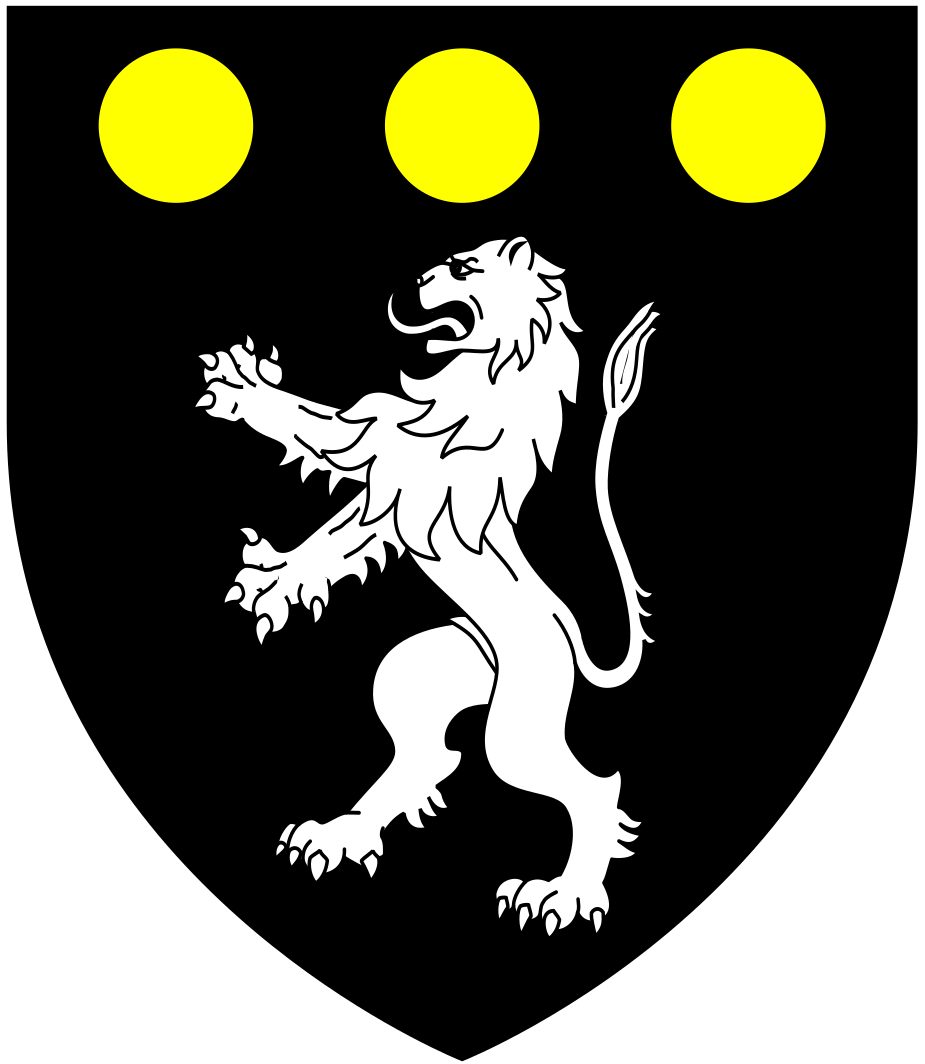
Arms of Treby: Sable, a lion rampant argent in chief three bezants

Sir George Treby JP (1643–1700), of Plympton, Devon, and of Fleet Street in the City of London, was Lord Chief Justice of the Common Pleas and six times Member of Parliament for the rotten borough of Plympton Erle, Devon, largely controlled by him and his descendants until abolished by the Great Reform Act 1832.

== Origins ==
The Treby family are believed to have originated at the estate of Treby in the parish of Yealmpton in Devon, from which they took their surname. George was the eldest son of Peter Treby of Holbeton in Devon, an attorney at the Court of Common Pleas by his wife Joan Snelling, daughter of John Snelling of Chaddle Wood, Plympton (which mansion house survives today after early 1800s rebuilding), and co-heiress to her nephew, Francis Snelling.

== Education ==
He was educated at Plympton Grammar School, and was accepted into Exeter College, Oxford in June 1660. He left without completing a degree.

== Career ==
=== Legal training ===
He entered the Middle Temple for his legal training on 24 October 1663 and was called to the Bar on 2 June 1671. He became a bencher of Middle Temple on 28 January 1681, served as a reader in 1686 and was treasurer in 1689.

=== Political career ===
In March 1677 he was elected a Member of Parliament for Plympton, over which pocket borough his family exerted considerable power. He was re-elected for both the February and August Parliaments of 1679, and again in 1689 and 1690.

In Parliament, he focused on subjects such as the wool trade, and other topics which concerned Devon. Treby acted as chairman of the Committee of Secrecy dedicated to investigating the supposed Popish Plot revealed in November 1678 by Titus Oates. Treby's stenography was deciphered by Andrea McKenzie and viewed as "a kind of casuistry."

In June 1679, proposals were discussed for Treby to be elected Speaker of the House of Commons, but were not acted upon as he suffered from extreme myopia and was unable to distinguish between different MPs.

He failed to be elected Chairman of the Committee of Elections and Privileges in 1679, but, in 1680, was named to the committee investigating people who had promoted the 'abhorrences' of petitions to King Charles II for summoning parliament. He became Chairman of the Elections Committee and continued to investigate the Popish Plot, helping introduce the second Exclusion Bill to Parliament.

In December 1680, he was one of the lawyers trying William Howard, 1st Viscount Stafford, the first peer to be arrested as part of the Popish Plot. At about the same time he was appointed Recorder of London and was knighted on 22 January 1681.

In February 1681, he was appointed a Justice of the Peace for London and Devon. He was again elected MP for Plympton in April 1681 for the Third Exclusion Parliament, and helped to introduce the Third Exclusion Bill. He disclosed information gained about the Popish Plot from Edward Fitzharris, intending to impeach him and thereby to gain more information about the other conspirators. Following the dissolution of the Third Exclusion Parliament and after any information revealed was no longer a threat to the King, Fitzharris was charged with treason.

Along with Sir Henry Pollexfen and Sir Francis Winnington, Treby went to court to try to prevent the execution of Fitzharris, his most important witness. The argument was that the Court of King's Bench could not try Fitzharris as he was currently being prosecuted by Parliament; to do so would be to move the case from a higher court to a lower one. The argument was thrown out as the dissolution of Parliament meant that the impeachment case had effectively ceased, and Fitzharris was executed shortly after. After his execution, Fitzharris's alleged confession was published by Francis Hawkins, in which it was claimed Treby and others had attempted to pressure him into giving false testimony. Treby is thought to have published Truth Vindicated to defend himself.

=== Opposition to the court ===
He was an active member of the Green Ribbon Club, and suggested that James Scott, 1st Duke of Monmouth was the rightful king. In 1681, he presented a petition from the City of London to the King requesting another Parliament. The King refused, saying the City was meddling in business that did not belong to it.

In part due to the City's call for a new Parliament, King Charles II and his lawyers attempted to dissolve its corporate charter by use of a writ of Quo warranto. Partly in an attempt to regain the King's favour for the City, Treby made a loyal speech when presenting the new Sheriffs of London in September 1682, but the Quo warranto action continued. Treby argued at the Court of King's Bench that any wrongs committed had been performed by individuals, not by the City as a whole; it was therefore improper to attack the City for those actions. He noted that while the Quo warranto writ was brought against the City Corporation and claimed that the Corporation's illegal acts had destroyed its corporate personality, it comprised a logical contradiction, being an attack on an organisation which the writ claimed had no legal existence. The latter point was brushed aside on the grounds that the corporation would only be destroyed if judgement was brought against it, which the court duly did. Judgement was deferred in the hopes the City might surrender its charter to the King, but Treby convinced the City leaders to continue fighting, saying that to surrender would violate their oaths to uphold the rights of the City and its citizens. Despite this, judgement was entered in October 1683 and the corporation ceased its legal existence. Treby lost his Recordership and his position as JP in various counties. In 1684, the Borough of Plympton had a similar case brought against it and informed by the example of the City of London, it surrendered, Treby losing his Recordership there as well.

In the elections to the 1685 Parliament Treby stood unsuccessfully against Richard Strode, a member of an old Devon gentry family of Newnham, Plympton St Mary, partially as a result of the Plympton Borough's charter having been re-drafted, which had damaged Treby's political standing. He did not serve for the rest of the reign of King James II and refused two offers for his reinstatement as Recorder of the City of London.

=== Under King William III ===
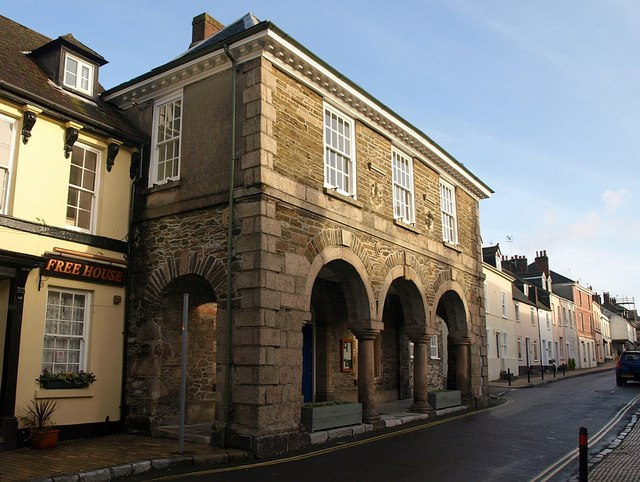
Plympton Borough Guildhall, built in 1688 at the joint expense of Sir George I Treby and Richard Strode (1638–1707) of Newnham, MP for Plympton Erle

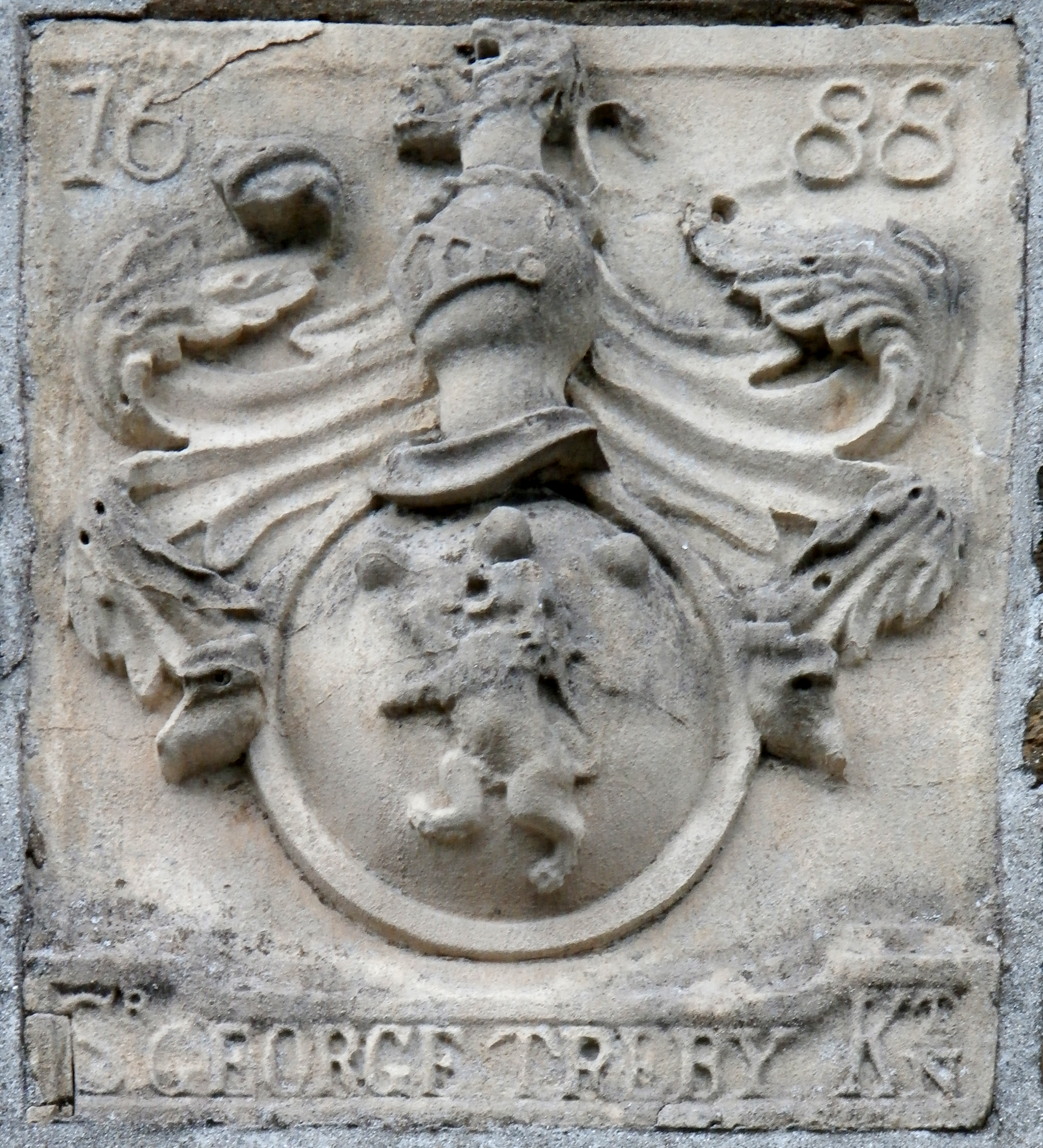
Arms of Sir George Treby (d. 1700) with crest: A demi-lion rampant. 1688 stone tablet affixed to facade of Plympton Guildhall, which building, together with Richard Stroud of Newnham, MP, he donated to the borough

In 1688, the Glorious Revolution overthrew King James II, and led to the crowning of King William III. He was reappointed as Recorder of London on 10 December 1688 and was again returned to Parliament for Plympton in 1689. He was named Solicitor General for England and Wales in March and Attorney General on 6 May 1689. While in Parliament he helped to draft the Bill of Rights (1689), a landmark document in British law. He was seemingly defeated in the March 1690 election, again by his near neighbour Richard Strode, but the result was overturned and voided by the House of Commons and Treby won the second vote two weeks later. In 1692, he was appointed Chief Justice of the Common Pleas and resigned his seat in the Commons and his Recordership.

In 1693, he presided at the trial of William Anderton for libel and in 1695 and 1696 he was among the judges who tried the Association plotters. In 1700, after suffering illness, he moved to Kensington near London, with his wife and died there on 13 December.

== Builds Plympton House ==
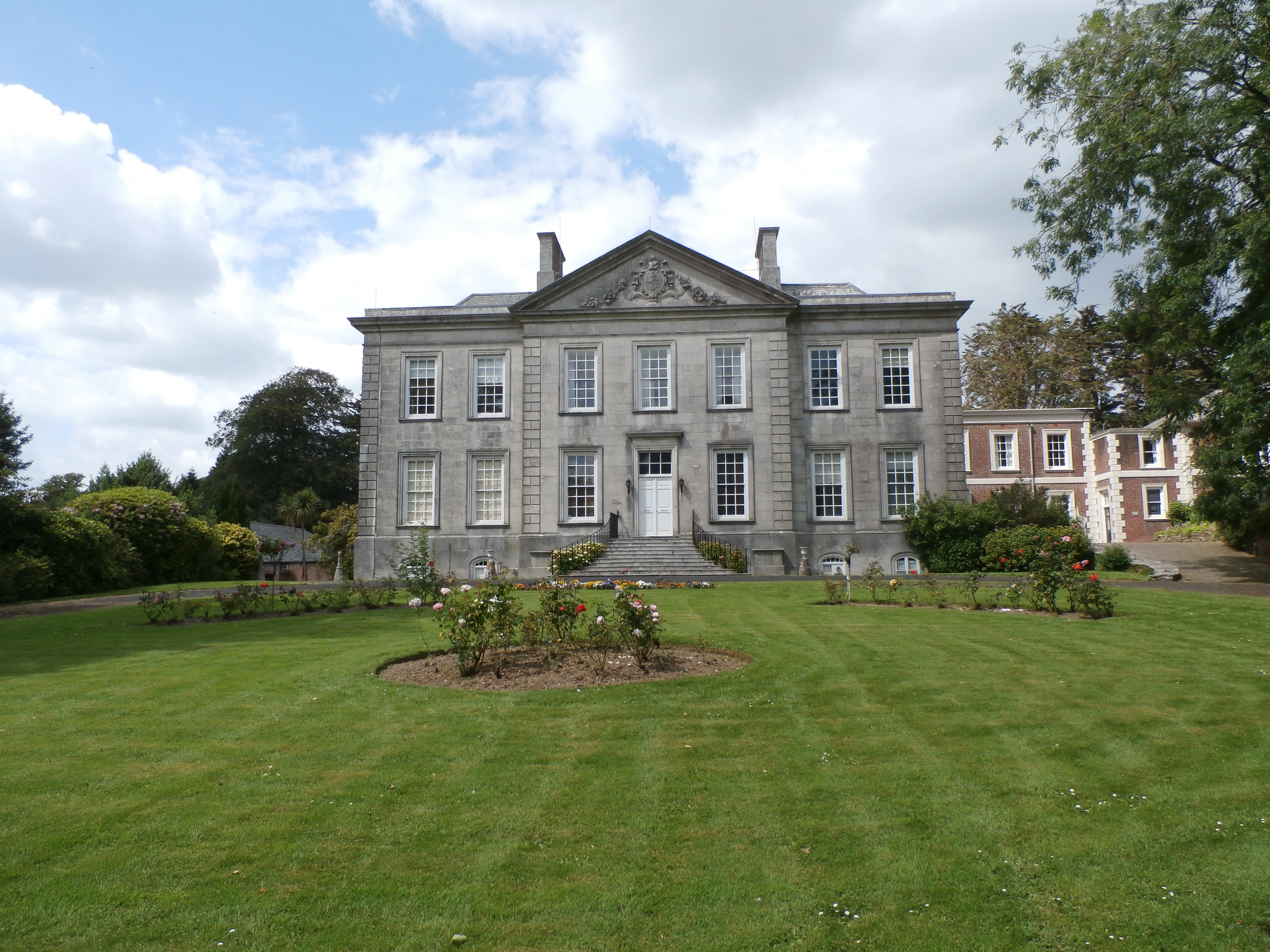
Plympton House, Plympton St Maurice, south front. Building commenced by Sir George Treby (d.1700) but unfinished at his death

He started the building of Plympton House, a grand country house, in the William-and Mary tradition, near St Maurice's Church in Plympton, but did not live to see its completion, which was performed circa 1715–20 by his son George Treby.

The arms of Treby are sculpted on a large escutcheon in the centre of the pediment of the south front.

== Marriages and progeny ==
Treby married four times:

- Firstly in 1675 to Anna Grosvenor (died pre-1677), a daughter of Edward Grosvenor, MP, of Blackfriars, London, and widow of Thomas Blount of Wricklesmarsh, Kent. Without progeny.
- Secondly on 12 April 1681, to Rachel Standish, daughter of James Standish of Hatton Garden, Middlesex. Without progeny.
- Thirdly on 14 December 1684 to Dorothy Grainge, daughter of Ralph Grainge, a lawyer of the Inner Temple, by whom he had two children:
  - George II Treby (c.1684–1742), MP for Plympton Erle (1708–1727) and for Dartmouth (1727–1742), also Secretary at War (1718–1724) and Master of the Household (1730–1740). His son George III Treby was also MP for Plympton Erle.
  - Maria Treby, who died young
- Fourthly on 6 January 1693 to Mary Brinley, daughter of a certain Brinley of London, who reportedly had a dowry of £10,000, by whom he had a son:
  - Brinley Treby.

Parliament of England
Preceded by Sir William Strode; Sir Nicholas Slanning	Member of Parliament for Plympton Erle; 1677–1685; With: Sir Nicholas Slanning 1677–79; Richard Hillersdon 1679; John Pollexfen 1679–1685	Succeeded by Sir Christopher Wren; Richard Strode
Preceded by Richard Strode; Sir Christopher Wren	Member of Parliament for Plympton Erle; 1689–1690; With: John Pollexfen 1689–90	Succeeded by Richard Strode; George Parker
Preceded by Richard Strode; George Parker	Member of Parliament for Plympton Erle; 1690–1692; With: John Pollexfen	Succeeded by Thomas Trevor; John Pollexfen
Legal offices
Preceded by Sir Henry Pollexfen	Chief Justice of the Common Pleas; 1692–1700	Succeeded by Thomas Trevor, 1st Baron Trevor
Political offices
Preceded by William Williams	Solicitor General for England and Wales; 1689	Succeeded by John Somers
Preceded by Henry Pollexfen	Attorney General for England and Wales; 1689–1692	Succeeded by John Somers
