= Thomas Sands =

Thomas, Tommy or Tom Sands may refer to:

- Thomas Sands (fencer) (1907–1984), American Olympic fencer
- Tommy Sands (born 1937), American singer and actor
- Tommy Sands (Irish singer) (born 1945), Irish folk singer
- Tom Sands (born 1954), Iowa State Representative from the 87th District
- Thomas Sands (MP), Member of Parliament for Cumberland, 1390 and 1395

== See also ==
- Sands (surname)
- Thomas Sandys (disambiguation)
