= John Somers, 1st Baron Somers =

English jurist and statesman (1651–1716)

The Right Honourable The Lord Somers PC FRS
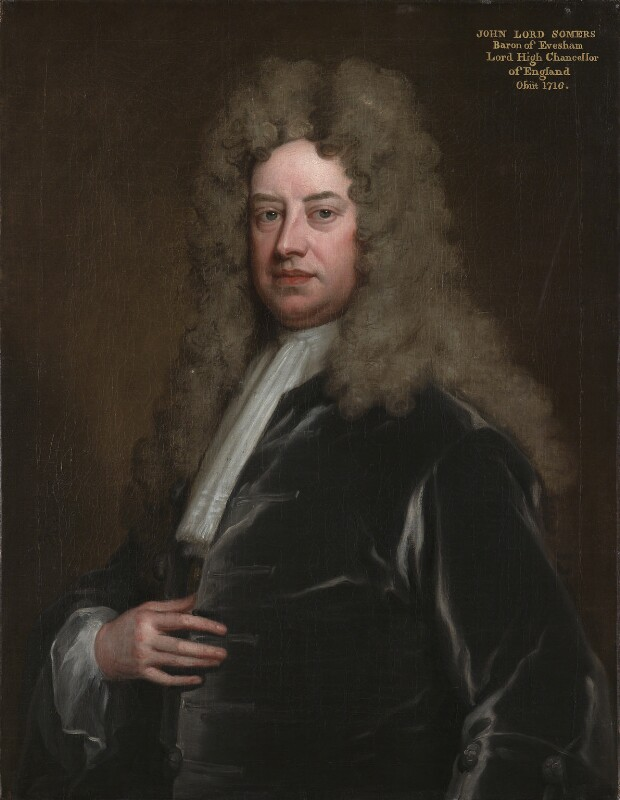
- Portrait by Godfrey Kneller, c. 1705

Lord President of the Council
- In office 25 November 1708 – 21 September 1710
- Preceded by: The Earl of Pembroke and Montgomery
- Succeeded by: The Earl of Rochester

Lord Chancellor
- In office 1697–1700
- Preceded by: Himself (as Lord Keeper)
- Succeeded by: In Commission

11th President of the Royal Society
- In office 1698–1703
- Preceded by: Charles Montagu
- Succeeded by: Isaac Newton

Lord Keeper of the Great Seal of England
- In office 1693–1697
- Preceded by: In Commission
- Succeeded by: Himself (as Lord Chancellor)

Personal details
- Born: 4 March 1651 Claines, Worcestershire, England
- Died: 26 April 1716 (aged 65) North Mymms, Hertfordshire, England
- Party: Whig
- Education: Trinity College, Oxford
- Occupation: Lawyer, politician

John Somers, 1st Baron Somers, PC, FRS (4 March 1651 – 26 April 1716) was an English jurist and Whig statesman. Somers first came to national attention in the trial of the Seven Bishops where he was on their defence counsel. He published tracts on political topics such as the succession to the crown, where he elaborated his Whig principles in support of the Exclusionists. He played a leading part in shaping the Revolution settlement. He was Lord High Chancellor of England under King William III and was a chief architect of the union between England and Scotland achieved in 1707 and the Protestant succession achieved in 1714. He was a leading Whig during the twenty-five years after 1688; with four colleagues he formed the Whig Junto.

== Early life ==
He was born at Claines, near Worcester, the eldest son of John Somers, an attorney in a large practice in that town, who had formerly fought on the side of the Parliament, and of Catherine Ceaverne of Shropshire. After being at school at Queen Mary's Grammar School, Walsall, and The King's School, Worcester he was entered as a gentleman commoner at Trinity College, Oxford, and afterwards studied law under Sir Francis Winnington, who became solicitor-general, and joined the Middle Temple.

== Early political career ==
He soon became intimate with the leaders of the country party, especially with Lord Essex, William Russell, and Algernon Sidney but never entered into their plans so far as to commit himself beyond recall. He was the author of a pamphlet supporting the Exclusion Bill, A Brief History of the Succession, Collected out of the Records and the Most Authentick Historians (1680). Somers showed that Parliament had for centuries regulated the succession of the English crown against the arguments of those who believed that Parliament had no right to alter the succession. Before the Norman Conquest of England in 1066, the Anglo-Saxon kings had been elected, and even after it Parliament had deposed kings and kings, in turn, had confirmed their title by Act of Parliament. Somers concluded:

...it hath been the constant opinion of all Ages that the Parliament of England had an unquestionable power to limit, restrain and qualify the Succession as they pleased, and that in all Ages they have put their power in practice; and that the Historian had reason for saying that seldom or never the third Heir in a right descent enjoyed the Crown of England.

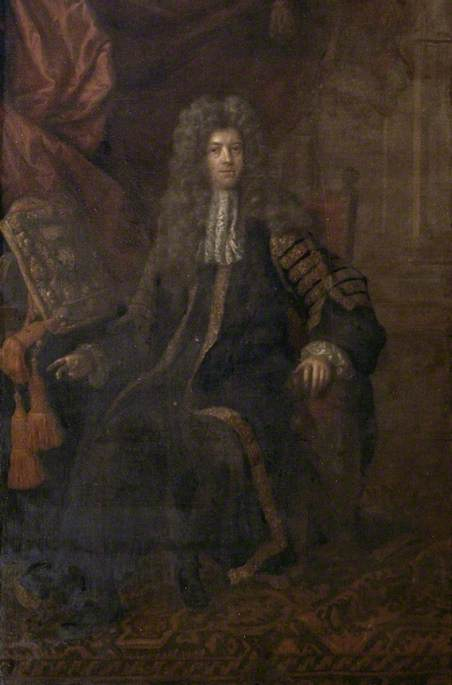
A painting of John Somers by Simon Du Bois

He was reputed to have written the Just and Modest Vindication of the Two Last Parliaments, which was published in April 1681 as the answer to Charles II's famous declaration of his reasons for dissolving them. The authorship of this has been disputed. According to Bishop Burnet it was "first penned by Sidney; but a new draught was made by Somers, and corrected by Jones". Lord Hardwicke saw a copy in Somers's handwriting amongst his manuscripts before they were destroyed by fire in 1752.

In 1681 Lord Shaftesbury was sent to the Tower of London without bail or recourse to a trial. In November he was charged at the Old Bailey for high treason, specifically for intending to levy war against the king. However, the grand jury of Middlesex threw out the bill against Lord Shaftesbury, and were vehemently attacked for so doing by government supporters. Somers published anonymously The Security of Englishmen's Lives, or, The Trust, Power, and Duty of the Grand Juries of England in 1681. Somers acknowledged that judges may advise but juries "are bound by their Oaths to present the Truth, the whole Truth, and nothing but the Truth, to the best of their own, not the Judges', Knowledge". The monarch must ensure that justice is carried out:

Whosoever hath learnt that the Kings of England were ordained for the good Government of the Kingdom in the Execution of the Laws, must needs know, that the King cannot lawfully seek any other benefit in judicial proceedings, than that common Right and Justice be done to the People according to their Laws and Customs.

Somers went on to argue that the monarch should hold the protection of the innocent above the punishment of the guilty:

If a Criminal should be acquitted wrongfully he may be reserved for future Justice from Man or God, if he doth not repent; but 'tis impossible that satisfaction or reparation should be made for innocent Bloodshed in the forms of Justice.

In 1683 he was counsel for the sheriffs Thomas Pilkington and Samuel Shute before the Court of King's Bench, and secured a reputation which continually increased until the trial of the Seven Bishops, in which he was junior counsel. One of the bishops objected that "too young and obscure a Man" should be retained on the defence counsel but Sir Henry Pollexfen refused to participate in the trial without him, saying that Somers was "the Man who would take most Pains, and go deepest into all that depended on Precedents and Records". In Macaulay's words: "Somers rose last. He spoke little more than five minutes: but every word was full of weighty matter; and when he sate down his reputation as an orator and a constitutional lawyer was established". In his speech Somers cited the case of Thomas v. Sorrel (1674) whereby it was ruled that no Act of Parliament could be abrogated except through Parliament. The bishops' petition had been described as a false, malicious and seditious libel. In his peroration Somers answered this charge:

My Lord, as to all the matters of fact alleged in the Petition,—that they are perfectly true we have shown by the Journals of both Houses. In every instance which the petitioners mention, this power of dispensation was considered in Parliament, and, on debate, declared to be contrary to law. They could have no design to diminish the prerogative because the King hath no such prerogative. Seditious, my Lord, the Petition could not be, for the matter of it must be seen to be strictly true. There could be nothing of malice, for the occasion, instead of being sought, was forced upon them. A libel it could not be, for the intent of the defendants was innocent, and they kept strictly within the bounds set by the law, which gives the subject leave to apply to his Prince by petition when he is aggrieved.

== Glorious Revolution ==
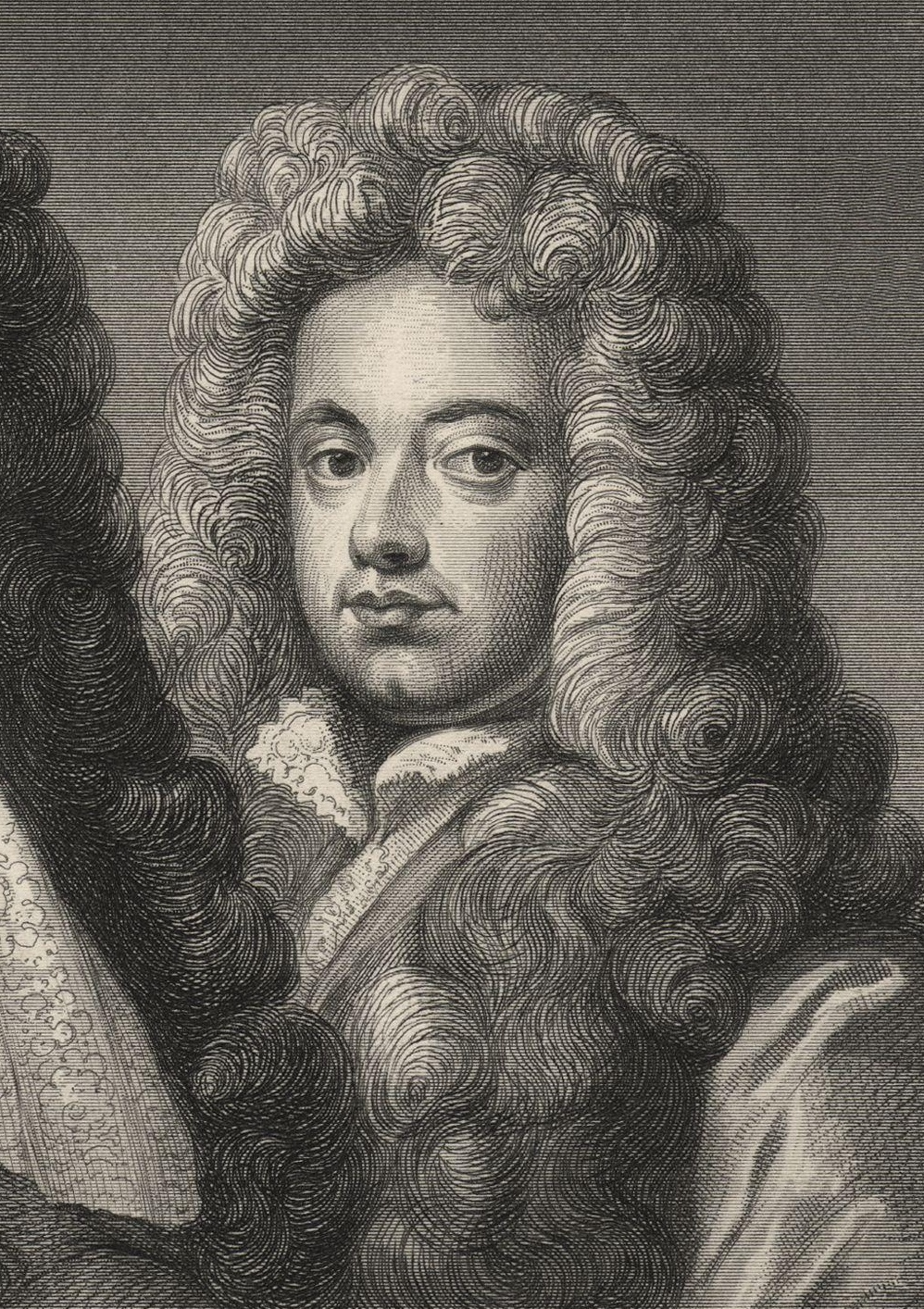
John Somers took a leading part in the secret councils of those who were planning the Glorious Revolution

In the secret councils of those who were planning the Glorious Revolution Somers took a leading part, and in the Convention Parliament was elected a member for Worcester. He was immediately appointed one of the managers for the Commons in the conferences between the houses, and in arguing the questions whether James II had left the throne vacant by abdication and whether the acts of the Convention Parliament were legal—that parliament having been summoned without the usual writs—he displayed great learning and legal subtlety.

In his maiden speech on 28 January 1689, Somers argued that James II had forfeited his claim to the allegiance of the English by casting himself into the hands of Louis XIV of France and conspiring "to subject the Nation to the Pope, as much as to a foreign prince". On 6 February Somers advocated the word "abdicate" rather than "desert" (which the House of Lords favoured) to describe James' flight to France. He concluded by stating that James' actions were a prime example of the act of abdicating:

That King James II, by going about to subvert the constitution, and by breaking the original contract between king and people, and by violating the fundamental laws, and withdrawing himself out of the kingdom, hath thereby renounced to be a king according to the constitution, by avowing to govern by a despotic power, unknown to the constitution, and inconsistent with it; he hath renounced to be a king according to the law, such a king as he swore to be at his coronation, such a king to whom the allegiance of an English subject is due.

Challenged by the Lords to produce a precedent whereby England had been without a monarch, Somers referred to a parliamentary roll from 1399 that stated that the throne had been unoccupied between the reigns of Richard II and Henry IV. Somers could not point to the interregnum of 1649–1660 because by law the reign of Charles II had started after the execution of Charles I. The Lords replied by pointing to a roll from the first year of the reign of Edward IV which showed that the roll of 1399 had been annulled. Sir George Treby supported Somers by producing the roll of the first year of the reign of Henry VII which repealed Edward IV's roll. Eventually the Lords accepted the abdication clause and that the throne was vacant at the behest of William, and passed a resolution affirming William and Mary's right to the crown.

Although some historians such as Macaulay have claimed Somers was made chairman of the committee which drew up the Declaration of Right, the committee's report was delivered to the Commons by Treby (the chairman always delivered the report to the House). However Somers did play a leading part in drawing up the Declaration, which would be passed in Parliament and become known as the Bill of Rights 1689. Although later generations exaggerated Somers' role as architect of the Bill of Rights, his biographer asserts that no one else can have a better claim to that title. Somers published anonymously A Vindication of the Proceedings of the Late Parliament of England in 1690. Here, Somers justified the war against France and the Bill of Rights:

The proceedings of the late parliament were so fair, so prudent, so necessary, and so advantageous to the nation, to the protestant interest in general, and in particular to the church of England, that all true Englishmen must needs acknowledge they owe to the then representatives of the nation, their privileges, their liberties, their lives, their religion, their present and future security from popery, slavery, and arbitrary power, had they done nothing else but enacted the rights and liberties of the subject, and settling the succession of the crown.

Somers went on to place the abolition of the dispensing power of sovereigns first in importance, then the parliamentary control of taxation, the outlawing of standing armies in time of peace unless Parliament decided otherwise, and the royal succession. Somers argued for the vital importance of the rule of law:

Our happiness then consists in this, that our princes are tied up to the law as well as we, and upon an especial account obliged to keep it up in full force, because if they destroyed the law, they destroyed at the same time themselves, by overthrowing the very foundation of their kingly grandeur and regal power. So that our government not being arbitrary, but legal, not absolute but political, our princes can never become arbitrary, absolute, or tyrants, without forfeiting at the same time their royal character, by the breach of the essential conditions of their regal power, which are to act according to the ancient customs and standing laws of the nation.

== Ministerial career ==
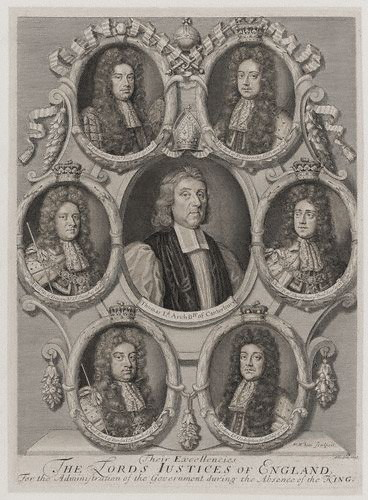
Somers was one of the Lords Justices who William appointed to govern while he was abroad in 1695

In May 1689 Somers was made Solicitor General for England and Wales. He now became William III's most confidential adviser. In the controversy which arose between the Houses on the question of the legality of the decision of the Court of King's Bench regarding Titus Oates, and of the action of the Lords in sustaining this decision, Somers was again the leading manager for the Commons, and has left a clear and interesting account of the debates. He was next employed in January 1690 as chairman of the select committee of the House of Commons on the Corporation Bill, by which those corporations which had surrendered their charters to the Crown during the last two reigns were restored to their rights; but he refused to associate himself with the violent measures of retaliation which the Whigs on that occasion endeavoured to include in the bill.

Re-elected as MP for Worcester in March 1690, he gave a speech in April which carried through the lower house, without opposition, the bill which declared all the laws passed by the Convention Parliament (1689) to be valid. As Solicitor-General he had to conduct the prosecution of Lord Preston and John Ashton in 1691, and did so with moderation and humanity which were in marked contrast to the customs of the former reigns. He was soon after appointed Attorney General for England and Wales and in that capacity strongly opposed the Bill for the regulation of trials in cases of high treason. In December 1692 Somers introduced into the Commons a Bill "for the preservation of their Majesties' persons and government". The two main provisions of the Bill were severe penalties for anyone who spoke or printed asserted or implied that William and Mary were monarchs only "in fact" and not "of right", and a new oath for all who held offices of profit under the Crown in which they had to swear to defend the government against the exiled King James and his adherents. However the Bill was defeated by 200 to 175.

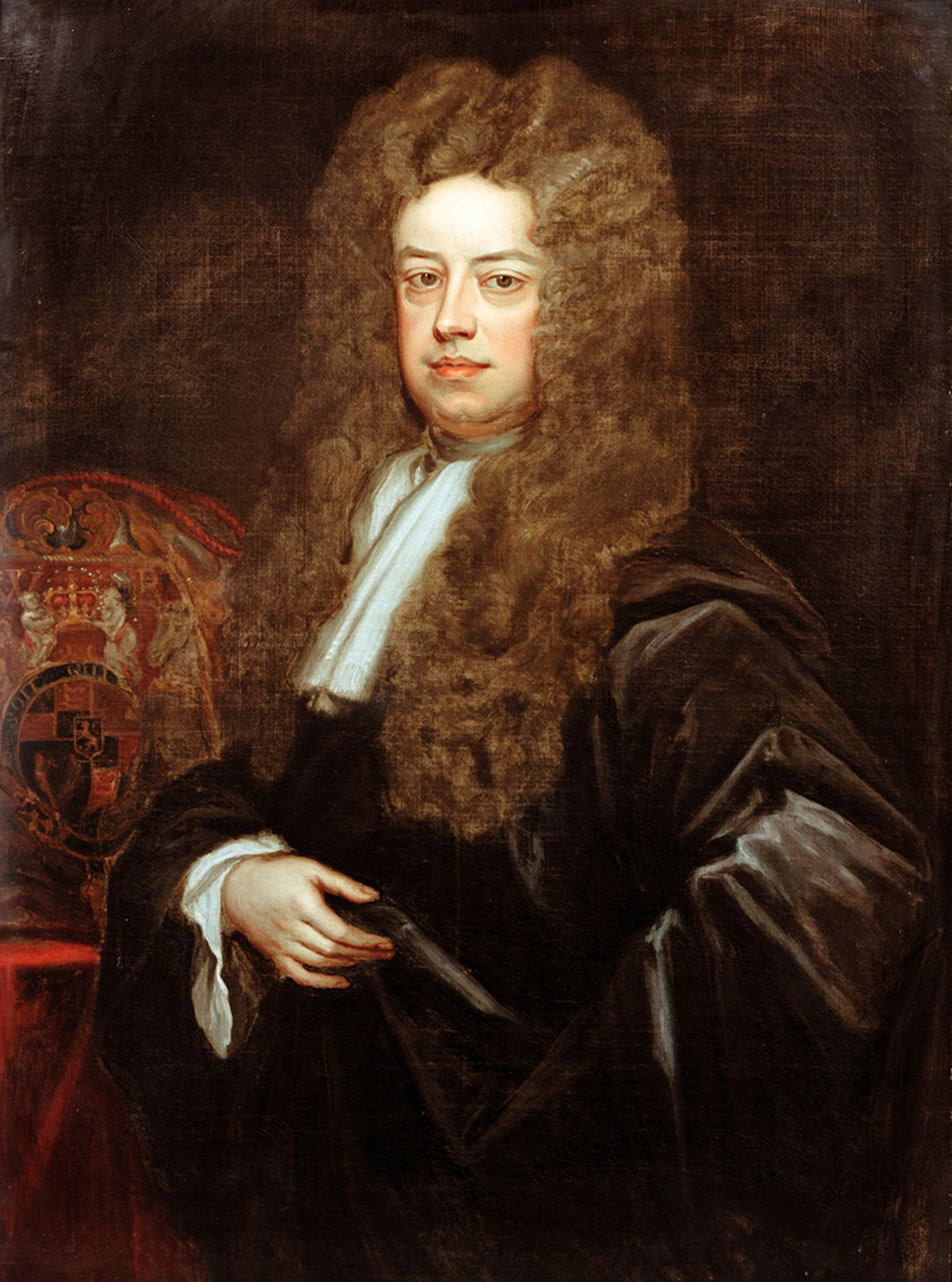
John Somers was appointed Lord Keeper of the Great Seal of the Realm on 23 March 1693

On 23 March 1693, the Great Seal of the Realm having meanwhile been in commission, Somers was appointed Lord Keeper, with a pension of £2000 a year from the day on which he should quit his office, and at the same time was made a privy councillor. He had previously been knighted. Somers now became the most prominent member of the Whig Junto, the small council which comprised the chief members of the Whig party. When William left in May 1695 to take command of the army in the Netherlands, Somers was made one of the seven Lords Justices to whom the administration of the kingdom during his absence was entrusted; and he was instrumental in bringing about a reconciliation between William and the Princess Anne.

In 1696 he delivered perhaps his best-known judgement in the Bankers case, a claim for compensation by several bankers who had suffered severe loss due to the Great Stop of the Exchequer of 1672 whereby the Crown had simply refused to pay its debts. The Court of Exchequer Chamber, after litigation of almost unprecedented length, found for the bankers; but Somers reversed the judgement on the technical point that the claim should have been brought by way of petition of right. Although his judgement was noted for erudition, it was much criticised for the result, in that the plaintiffs, after almost 25 years, were denied justice on a technicality. The House of Lords in turn reversed Somers's judgement in 1700.

== Lord Chancellor and impeachment ==
In April 1697 Somers was made Lord Chancellor, and was created a peer by the title of Baron Somers, of Evesham. When the discussion arose on the question of disbanding the army, he summed up the case against disbanding, in answer to John Trenchard in a remarkable pamphlet called The Balancing Letter. In August 1698 he went to Tunbridge Wells for his health. While there he received the king's letter announcing the first Partition Treaty, and at once replied with a memorandum representing the necessity in the state of feeling in England of avoiding further war. When the king, on the occasion of the Disbanding Bill, expressed his determination to leave the country, Somers boldly remonstrated, while he dearly expressed in a speech in the Lords the danger of the course that was being taken. Hitherto Somers's character had kept him free from attack at the hands of political opponents; but his connection in 1699 with the notorious Captain William Kidd, to the cost of whose expedition Somers had given £1,000, afforded an opportunity; the vote of censure, however, proposed upon him in the House of Commons for giving Kidd a commission under the great seal was rejected by 199 to 131. The attack was renewed shortly on the ground of his having accepted grants of Crown property to the amount of £1600 a year, but was again defeated. On the subject of the Irish forfeitures, a third attack was made in 1700, a motion being brought forward to request the king to remove Somers from his counsels and presence forever; but this again was rejected by a large majority. In consequence, however, of the incessant agitation William now requested Somers to resign; this he refused to do, but gave up the seals to William's messenger. In 1701 he was impeached by the Commons on account of the part he had taken in the negotiations relating to the Partition Treaty in 1698, and defended himself most ably before the House, answering the charges seriatim. The impeachment was voted and sent up to the Lords, but was there dismissed. On the death of the King, Somers retired almost entirely into private life.

== Later life ==
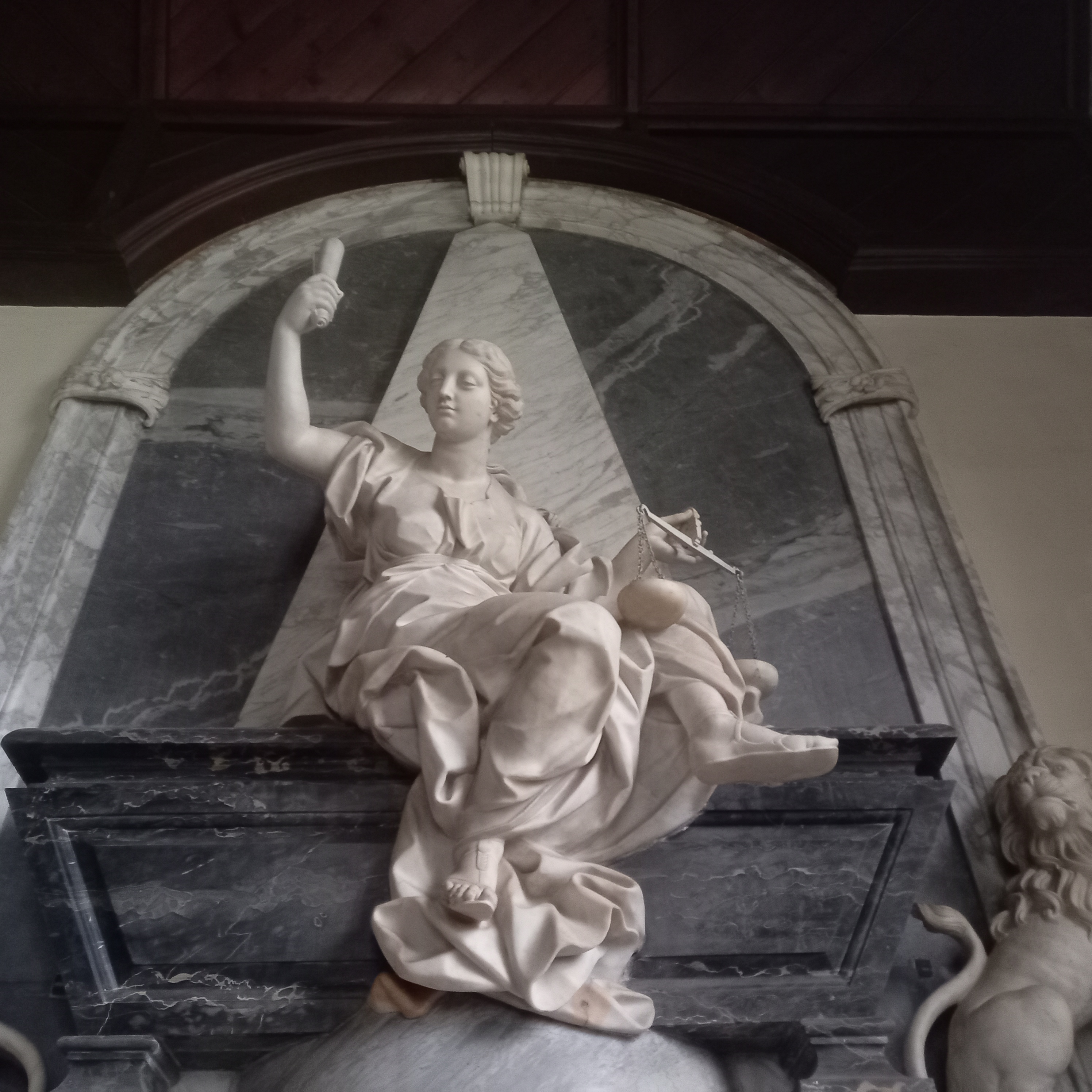
Monument to Lord Somers in St Mary the Virgin's Church, North Mymms, where he is buried. It dipicts an allegorical figure of justice, by the Flemish sculptor Peter Scheemakers.

He was President of the Royal Society from 1698 to 1703. He was, however, active in 1702 in opposing the Occasional Conformity Bill, and in 1706 was one of the managers of the Act of Union 1707. In the same year, he carried a bill regulating and improving the proceedings of the law courts. He was made Lord President of the Council in 1708 upon the return of the Whigs to power, and retained the office until their downfall in 1710; while Queen Anne had long detested the Whig Junto, she came to like and admire Somers: Jonathan Swift called him "the perfect courtier" whose charm and good manners were almost irresistible. He spent his later years at Brookmans Park in Hertfordshire. Somers died on the day the Septennial Bill—which extended the maximum life of parliaments from three years to seven—passed the Commons. A story, possibly apocryphal, goes that Lord Townshend visited Somers during his last illness, with Somers saying to Townshend on his death bed:

I have just heard of the work in which you are engaged, and [I] congratulate you upon it. I never approved the Triennial Bill, and always considered it, in effect, the reverse of what it was intended. You have my hearty approbation of this business, and I think it will be the greatest support possible to the liberty of the country.

Somers never married, but left two sisters, of whom the eldest, Mary, married Charles Cocks, whose grandson, Charles became the second Baron Somers in 1784, the title subsequently descending in this line.

== Legacy ==
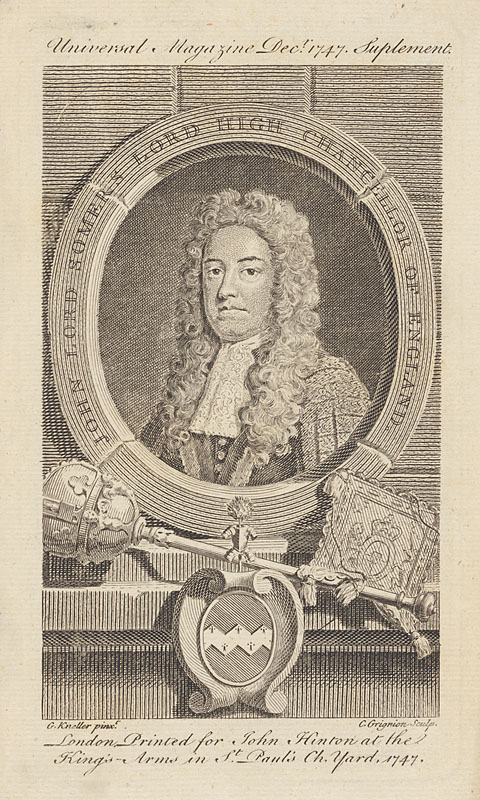
A posthumous engraving of John Somers by Charles Grignion the Elder

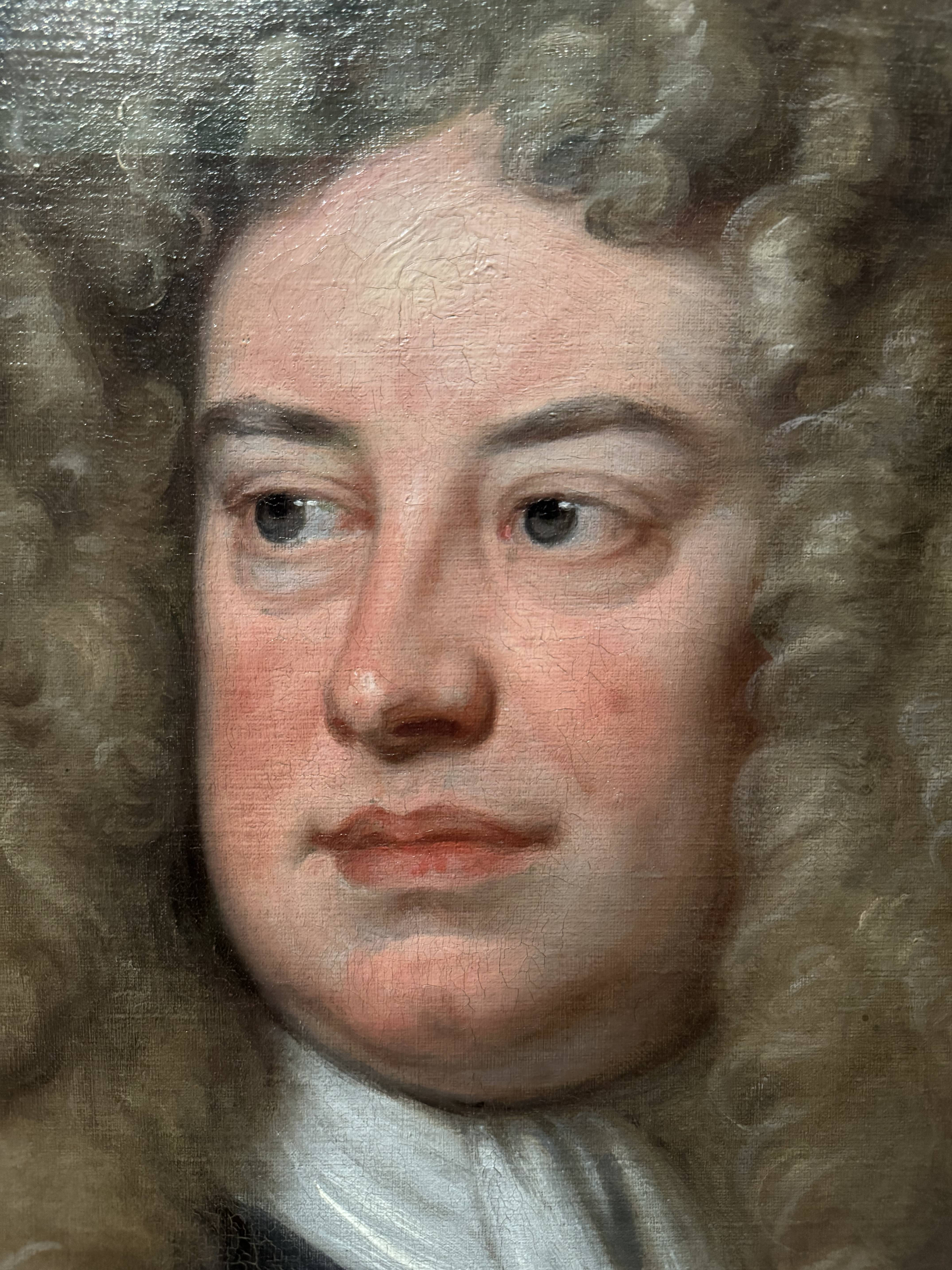
Portrait by Kneller of Somers in 1715-16, at the end of his life

Somers is immortalised in St Stephen's Hall, where he and other notable Parliamentarians look on at visitors to Parliament. In the eighteenth century, Somers was hailed as the chief constitutional architect of the Protestant succession. The achievements of Somers and other Whig lawyers defined Whiggism for those living in the reigns of King George I and George II. William Pitt the Elder stated in 1761 that "he learnt his maxims and principles" from "the greatest lawyers, generals and patriots of King William's days: named Lord Somers". For the later eighteenth-century Whig politician, Edmund Burke, Somers was of the "Old Whigs" whom he admired against the New Whigs who supported the French Revolution. Burke wrote: "I never desire to be thought a better whig than Lord Somers". The Whig historian Thomas Macaulay, writing in the nineteenth century, held Somers in high esteem:

...the greatest man among the members of the Junto, and in some respects, the greatest man of that age, was the Lord Keeper Somers. He was equally eminent as a jurist and as a politician, as an orator, and as a writer. His speeches have perished; but his State papers remain, and are models of terse, luminous, and dignified eloquence. He had left a great reputation in the House of Commons, where he had, for four years, been always heard with delight; and the Whig members still looked up to him as their leader, and still held their meetings under his roof. ... In truth, he united all the qualities of a great judge, an intellect comprehensive, quick and acute, diligence, integrity, patience, suavity. In council, the calm wisdom, which he possessed in a measure rarely found among men of parts so quick and of opinions so decided as his, acquired for him the authority of an oracle. ... From the beginning to the end of his public life he was a steady Whig.

A fire at the law offices of Charles Yorke in Lincoln's Inn Square on 27 January 1752 destroyed a large amount of Somers's surviving private papers.

The Town of Somers, Connecticut was incorporated in 1734 by the General Court of Massachusetts and named for Somers.

== Works ==
- Translation of Alcibiades chapter of Plutarch's Lives Translated From the Greek by Several Hands (1683) John Dryden, editor.

== See also ==
- List of presidents of the Royal Society

== Notes ==
Legal offices
| Preceded by Sir George Treby | Solicitor General for England and Wales; 1689–1692 | Succeeded by Sir Thomas Trevor |
| Preceded by Sir George Treby | Attorney General for England and Wales; 1692–1693 | Succeeded by Sir Edward Ward |
Political offices
| Preceded by In Commission | Lord Keeper; 1693–1697 | Succeeded by Sir Nathan Wright (Lord Keeper) |
| Preceded by In Commission | Lord Chancellor; 1697–1700 | Succeeded by Sir Nathan Wright (Lord Keeper) |
| Preceded by The Earl of Pembroke and Montgomery | Lord President of the Council; 1708–1710 | Succeeded by The Earl of Rochester |
Honorary titles
| Preceded by The Earl of Plymouth | Custos Rotulorum of Worcestershire; 1715–1716 | Vacant Title next held by The Lord Parker |
Professional and academic associations
| Preceded by Charles Montagu | 11th President of the Royal Society; 1698–1703 | Succeeded by Isaac Newton |
