= East India Company v Sandys =

- Court: Court of King's Bench
- Citation: (1684) 10 St Tr 371

Keywords
- Monopoly

East India Company v Sandys (1684) 10 St Tr 371 is a UK company law and competition law case, concerning monopolies and the East India Company.

== Facts ==
Thomas Sandys was an English merchant. Sandys traded in India, returning with a shipload of cloth which arrived in the English Channel in January 1682. When the ship sailed up the River Thames, officials of the East India Company, which held a monopoly on trading in the East Indies, seized the ship and attempted to levy a fine.

The case was heard in 1683.

== Judgment ==
Lord Chief Justice Lord Jeffreys held that the East India Company was entitled to levy the fine, citing the Statute of Monopolies of 1624. He held that Sandys and the other interloping merchants had never been possession of the East India trade, and they had suffered no loss of freedom or restraint of liberty. He upheld the East India Company charter, and the royal prerogative over foreign trade.

== See also ==
- UK company law
