= George Treby =

George Treby may refer to:

- Sir George Treby (judge) (1643–1700), British judge and Member of Parliament
- George Treby (politician) (1684–1742), British politician and Secretary at War, eldest son of the above
- George Treby (younger) (c.1726–1761), MP for Plympton Erle, son of the above
- George Hele Treby (c.1727–1763), MP for Plympton Erle, younger brother of the above
- George Treby (British Army officer) (168c. 5–?), British Army officer and politician
