= Treby =

Treby is a surname. Notable people with the surname include:

- Treby family, noble English family from Plympton
- George Treby, several people
- Paul Treby Ourry (1758–1832), British politician

== See also ==
- Tręby Stare, a village in the administrative district of Gmina Kleczew, Poland
