= Paul Ourry =

Paul Ourry may refer to:

- Paul Henry Ourry (1719–1783), Royal Navy officer and British politician
- Paul Treby Ourry (1758–1783), British politician
