= Bayfordbury =

Country house in Bayford, Hertfordshire, England

Coordinates: 51°46′35″N 00°05′42″W

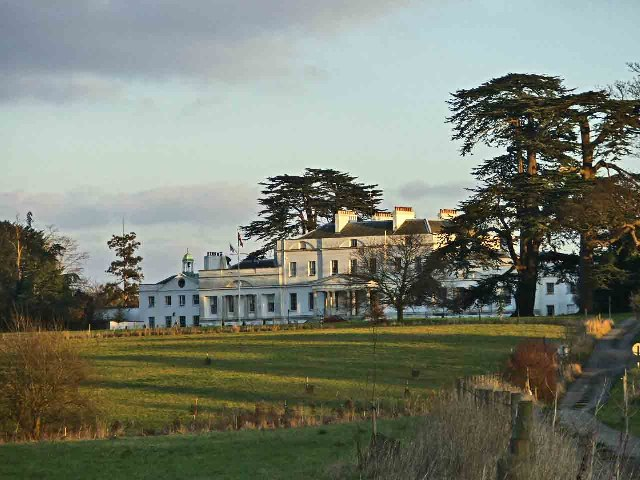
The large Grade II* listed country house and Lebanon Cedar trees at Bayfordbury

Bayfordbury, Hertfordshire, is a large Grade II* listed country house with surrounding parkland, and the location of a University of Hertfordshire campus, housing its biology/geography field station and observatory.

== History of Bayfordbury ==
Bayfordbury House was originally built between 1759 and 1762 for well-to-do London merchant Sir William Baker. It was upgraded to its present appearance by his son, also William Baker between 1809 and 1812. After the death of Admiral Sir Lewis Clinton-Baker in 1940, the estate was leased to the Dr Barnardo's charity.

The 372-acre Bayfordbury estate was then bought by the John Innes Centre in 1948 and developed into a School of Cytology. A new Cell Biology building was built in 1959, later to become the Science Learning Centre. In 1967 the John Innes Centre moved to its present site in Norwich and the Bayfordbury estate was bought by the Hertfordshire Council in 1967 for the use of Hatfield Polytechnic.

== Bayfordbury Observatory ==
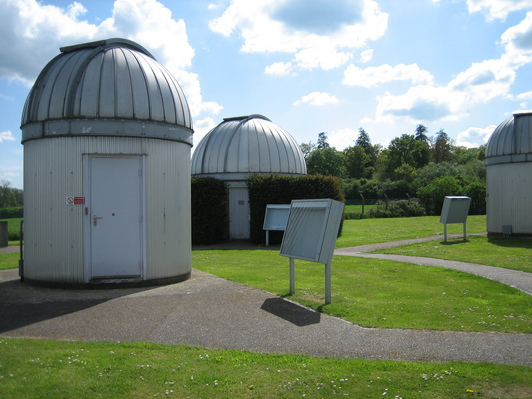
The domes housing some of the optical telescopes at Bayfordbury Observatory

In 1969 the Bayfordbury Observatory was established within the grounds of the house by Hatfield Polytechnic (now the University of Hertfordshire). This is the university's astronomical and atmospheric physics remote sensing observatory, one of the largest teaching astronomical observatories in the UK.

== Science Learning Centre ==
In 2005 the Regional Science Learning Centre was set up at Bayfordbury to run courses that provided continuing professional development for anyone involved in the teaching of science. The Science Learning Centre had close ties with the nearby observatory and hosted activities during its astronomy open evenings such as planetarium shows and talks. The building also hosted some of the observatory's scientific instruments on its roof.

== Field station ==
The University of Hertfordshire uses the site as its biology and geography field station. The university owns a number of Bayfordbury's woodlands and meadows including the Clinton-Baker Pinetum, Sailor's Grove and Hook's Grove. The lake at Bayfordbury was created by the Baker family in 1772 and is now managed for its newts, crayfish and pure genetic stock of Crucian carp. The site also houses five large glasshouses, used for plant and aquatic research.

== Clinton-Baker Pinetum ==
The Clinton-Baker Pinetum is a 10-acre pinetum containing over 150 species of conifers from all over the world, many over 100 years old. The first conifers were planted in 1767 by Sir William Baker, the original owner of the mansion.
