= William Baker (politician, born 1705) =

English merchant and politician (1705-1770)

- Born: 5 November 1705
- Died: 23 January 1770 (aged 64)
- Occupations: Merchant and politician

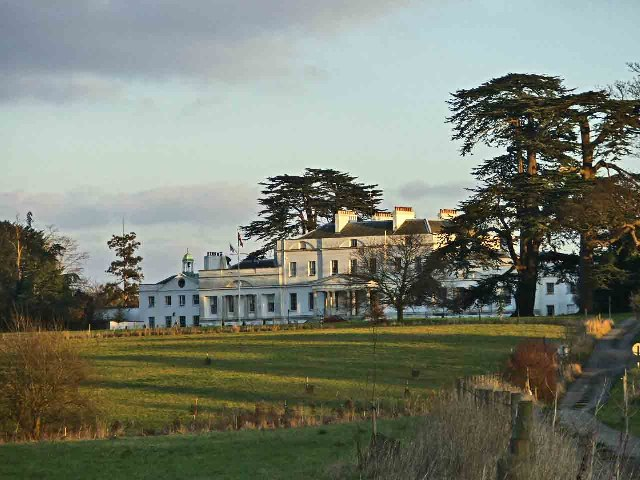
Bayfordbury House

Sir William Baker (5 November 1705 – 23 January 1770) was an English merchant and politician, a Member of the Parliament of Great Britain and Governor of the Hudson's Bay Company.

He was the son of John Baker, a London draper. He became an Alderman of London in 1739 and a director of the East India Company in 1741–5, 1746–50 and 1751–53. He was also deputy chairman (1749, 1751–52), chairman (1749–50, 1752–53), Deputy Governor (1750-60) and the 11th Governor (1760–70) of the Hudson's Bay Company. He was knighted in 1760.

He was MP for Plympton Erle from 1747 to 1768. In 1759 he built a country house in an estate at Bayfordbury in Hertfordshire.

He died in 1770. He had married Mary, the daughter of Jacob Tonson, publisher, and with her had 6 sons and a daughter. His eldest son, also William Baker, who inherited and improved Bayfordbury, was also an MP.

The community Baker Lake in Nunavut, Canada was named after him.

Parliament of Great Britain
Preceded by Richard Edgcumbe; George Edgcumbe	Member of Parliament for Plympton Erle; 1747–1768; With: George Treby 1747–1761; George Hele Treby 1761–1763; Paul Henry Ourry 1763–1768	Succeeded by Paul Henry Ourry; William Baker
