= George Treby (British Army officer) =

George Treby (born c. 1685) was a British Army officer and politician who sat in the House of Commons from 1722 to 1727.

Treby was the only son of James Treby and the nephew of Sir George Treby, Lorg Chief Justice. He joined the army and was a lieutenant in Colonel Roger Townshend's Foot in April 1706. He was captain in. Colonel de Magny's Portuguese Regiment of Foot in 1709, and captain in the 10th Dragoon Guards in 1715. In January 1720 he became captain and lieutenant-colonel in the 1st Foot Guards and then reserve captain when he became Governor of Dartmouth castle in the same year.

Treby was returned unopposed as Member of Parliament for Dartmouth on the Treasury interest, at the 1722, probably through the influence of his cousin, George Treby of Plympton. He did not stand again.in 1727.

It is not known when he died.

Parliament of Great Britain
Preceded by Joseph Herne; John Fownes (junior)	Member of Parliament for Dartmouth; 1722–1727; With: Thomas Martyn	Succeeded by George Treby II; Walter Carey
