= HMS Success (1740) =

20-gun Royal Navy ship

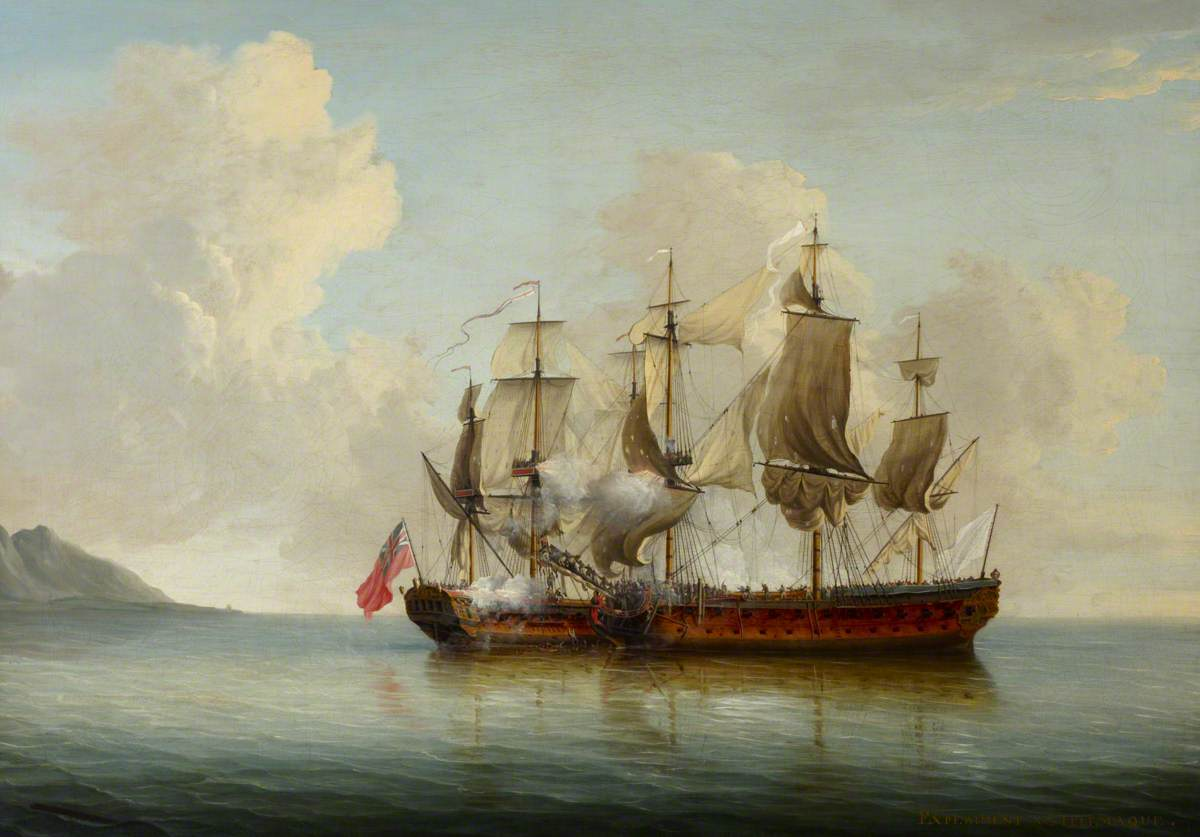
- HMS Success's sister ship Experiment (L) takes the French ship Telemaque (R)

History

Great Britain
- Name: HMS Success
- Ordered: 4 October 1739
- Builder: Hugh Blaydes, Hull
- Cost: £4,838.3.3.d
- Laid down: 30 October 1739
- Launched: 14 August 1740
- Completed: 19 October 1740
- Commissioned: July 1740
- Fate: Broken up May 1779=

General characteristics
- Class & type: Sixth-rate frigate
- Tons burthen: 43642/94 (bm)
- Length: 106 ft (32.3 m) (gundeck); 87 ft 3 in (26.6 m) (keel)
- Beam: 30 ft 8 in (9.3 m)
- Depth of hold: 9 ft 5 in (2.9 m)
- Propulsion: Sails
- Complement: 140
- Armament: 20 × 9-pounder guns

HMS Success was a 20-gun Royal Navy ship launched in 1740 as the first government contract for the Blaydes Yard in Hull. She had a crew of 140 men. She had several famous commanders over her lifetime.

== History ==
She was commissioned in October 1739 at a cost of £4800 and launched July 1740 under the command of Captain Bradwarden Thomas who took her over the Atlantic to New England. There in October 1742 command passed to Captain Jack Wickham who sailed her to Lisbon in 1743. In June 1744 she went to Dunkirk.

From January to May 1746 she underwent repairs at Sheerness Dockyard. She went under further alterations and repair at Deptford bringing total costs to £7000 over her original build cost and did not return to action until June 1749 when she returned to New England. After three years service she returned for further repair at Woolwich which were completed May 1754 at a cost of a further £7000.

Under command of Captain John Rous she was part in the Battle of Fort Beausejour off the New Brunswick coast in May 1755. In August 1755 the ship attacked several French-owned fishing boats and destroyed harbour facilities at Codroy, Newfoundland.

In 1757 she was stationed at Halifax, Nova Scotia and command transferred to Captain Paul Henry Ourry who took her on the Louisburg Expedition but departed prior to the Siege of Louisburg.

In 1758 she had a fourth refit, again at Deptford which was completed in March. In June 1758 still under command of Captain Ourry she attacked St Malo before joining a convoy to South Carolina where command changed to Captain George Watson (d.1774).

In 1761/2 she had a fifth repair and upgrade, again at Deptford, costing over £5000. She then returned to South Carolina with Captain John Botterell.

She was paid off in February 1764 but had three further captains, the last Skeffington Lutwidge leaving her in August 1775. She was broken in Sheerness in May 1779. This exercise reused as much material as possible for other ships.

The ship's logbook of 1747 to 1752 plus the private logbook of midshipman John Gauntlett covering the period 1754 to 1756 are held at the National Archive, Kew.
