= Plympton House =

Grade I listed country house in Plympton, Devon, United Kingdom

Coordinates: 50°23′06″N 4°02′45″W

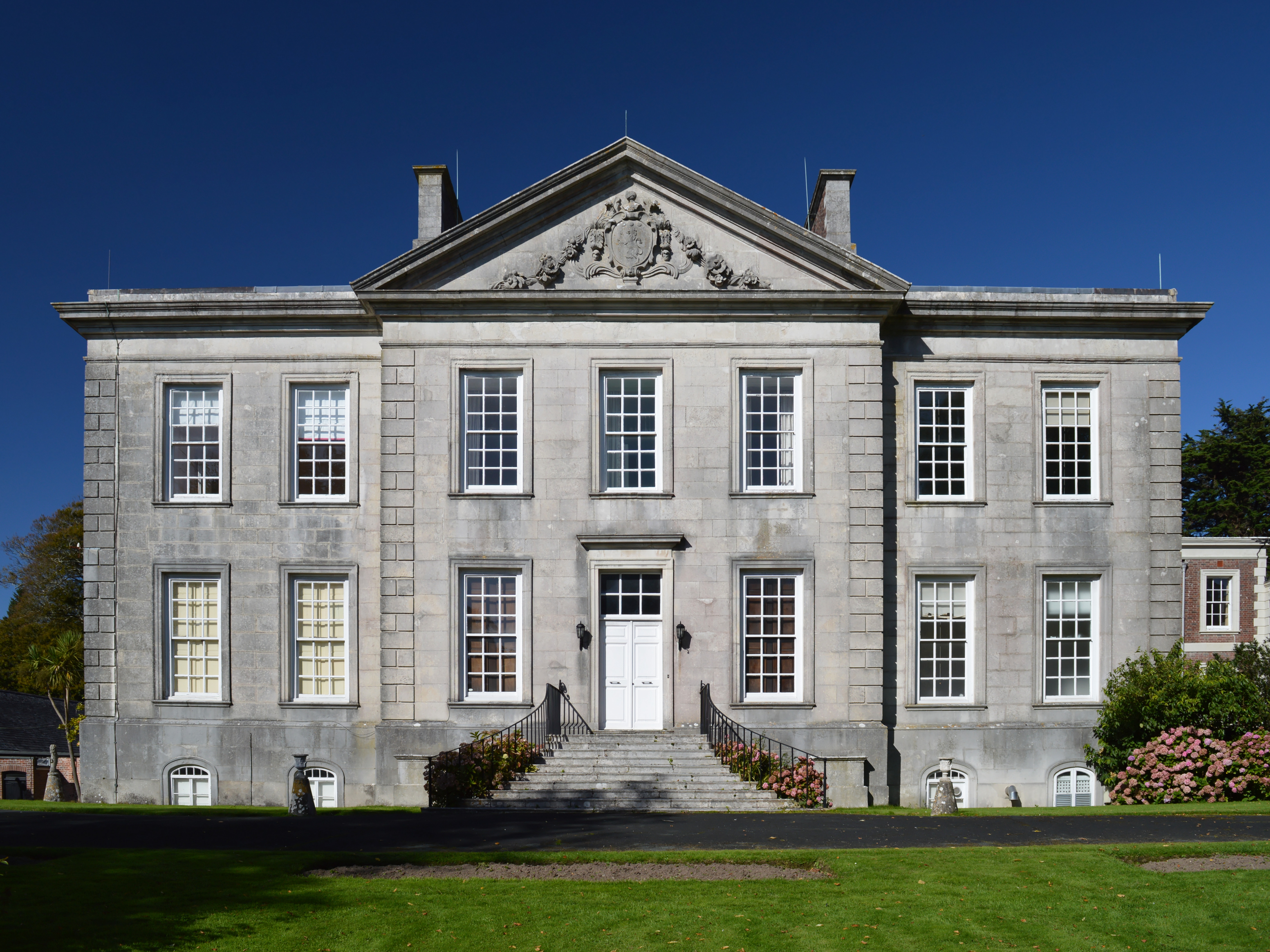
Plympton House

Plympton House is the principal residence at the Plympton House Estate, in the parish of Plympton St Maurice, Devon, England. It is a Grade I listed country house, in the William and Mary tradition, near St Maurice's Church in Plympton, commenced by Sir George Treby (1643–1700) and completed c. 1715 – 1720 by his son George Treby (c. 1684 – 1742). The architect is unknown although accounts in 1720 refer to William Veale, mason. Its kitchen garden wall, southern boundary walls and gate piers and walls are Grade II listed.

The house has had three main uses in its 300-year history: firstly a family home; secondly an asylum; and thirdly a convent and residential care home. Having been disused for several years, in 2016 a new plan was announced to bring the estate back into regular use with a sensitive redevelopment plan, creating a community of 14 homes across the site.

== Description ==
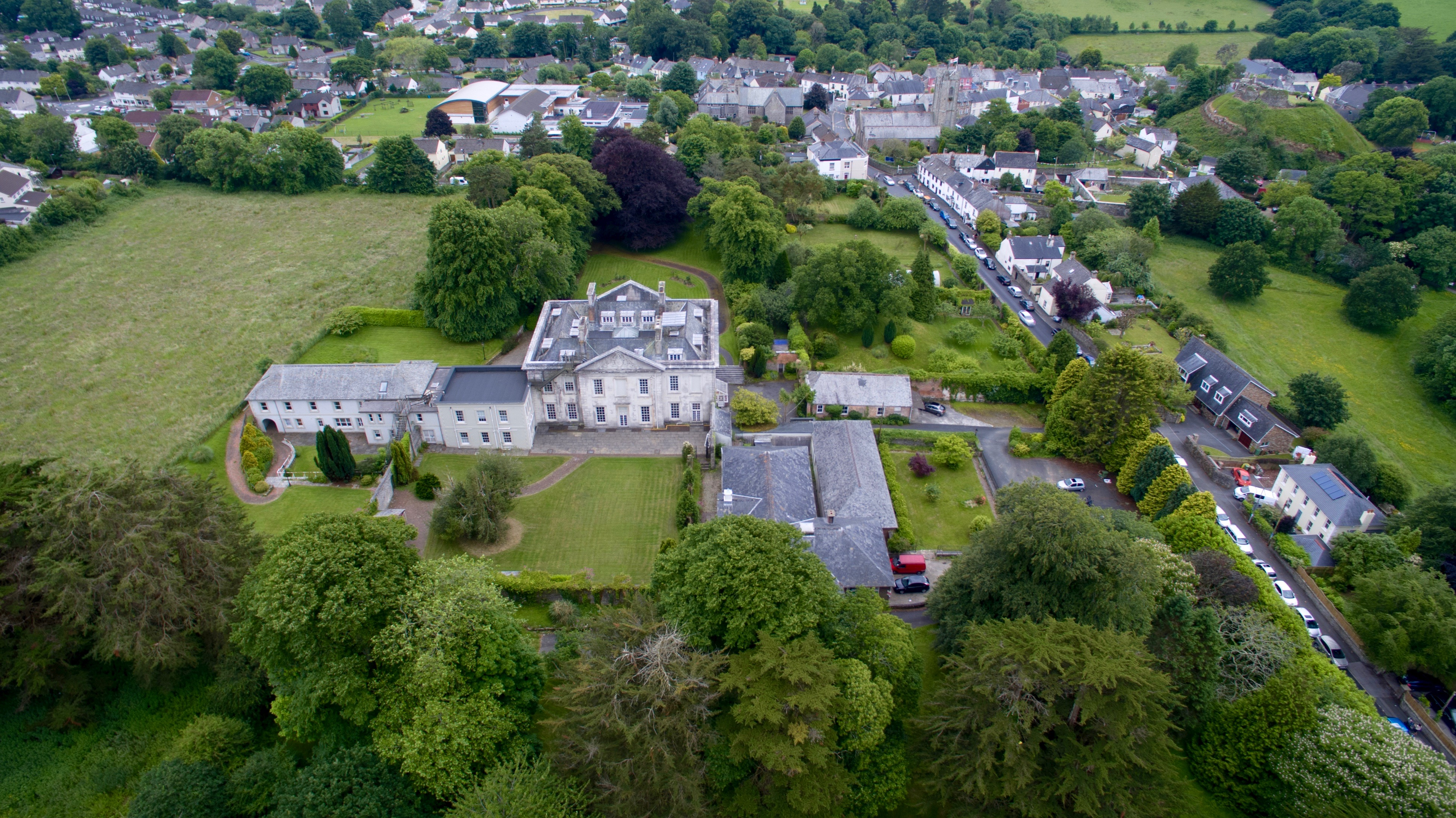
Aerial view of the estate from the north in 2016

The main entrance is from Longcause to the south. Two pairs of tall stone gate piers (listed grade II) set in a concave red-brick boundary wall with up-swept coping (listed grade II) are surmounted by stone heraldic beasts. A second entrance to the estate, the West Gate from George Lane, passes the remains of the early 18th century stables and dairy barn to reach a courtyard on the west side of the house.

The south facade of the main building is of Portland stone and comprises two storeys above a basement. The central pediment is ornamented with a carved coat of arms, and the facade is articulated by rusticated quoins. Due to the lie of the land, the basement storey is exposed to view on the west side of the building, which is constructed in brick with stone quoins and segment-headed windows. Externally the house is largely unaltered since the early 18th century, except for the construction of a late 20th-century east wing which housed ensuite bedrooms for the care home and a modern west wing which housed accommodation for the nuns and the chapel.

North-west of the house are early 18th-century stables, a dairy barn, walled enclosures and courts, one of which formerly served as a wood yard.

=== Gardens ===
Early 18th-century walled garden enclosures surround the house. The main garden lies below the south facade of the house and is of about the same width as the building. It runs down to the principal entrance on Longcause. West of it, and parallel to it, lies the kitchen garden, between the north end of which and the south elevation of the stables is the Mount Garden. To the north of the house is a court, set into rising ground, which is laid down to grass. Parallel to the west facade of the house, and separated from it by a brick wall, is a narrow walk which extends the length of the kitchen garden, from which it is screened by a second high brick wall (listed grade II). At the north end of this walk a gate leads into the north-east corner of the Mount Garden which lies to the south-west of the house and to the north of the kitchen garden. This walled enclosure is dominated by a large mount c. 3.5m high, which occupies most of the area. The south face of the north wall of the Mount Garden is constructed with recessed arcading for espaliered fruit trees.

The walled kitchen garden lies to the south-west of the house and to the south of the Mount Garden. The rectangular area with its perimeter walk was originally subdivided into three sections by two internal walls running from east to west across it. The kitchen garden walls contain further recessed arcading for fruit trees. The north wall has been demolished. The present wall which screens the garden from George Lane is a late 20th-century reconstruction, necessitated by widening of the road beyond.

== History ==
It has been suggested that the site of Plympton House was, until c. 1700, a group of medieval strip fields, possibly with early origins but there is no direct evidence of pre-medieval activity on the site and no record of excavations appear on the NMR Excavation Index. Opinions differ as to whether the development of the medieval town reached as far east as the site. The pattern of burgage plots suggests that it did not but it might reasonably be expected that some development would have occurred to the east of the castle, in the vicinity of the church. A medieval leper hospital stood at the junction of George Lane and the Ridgeway but this is some way from the site. As related below, there were however buildings on the site before 1700, the most likely location being along the frontage at the lower end of George Street and into Longcause, and archaeological evidence of them may survive.

=== Treby family ===
The building of Plympton House was begun by Sir George Treby (1643–1700). He had been baptised at Plympton St Mary, the son of Peter Treby "Gent" and after attending Exeter College Oxford studied law at Middle Temple and was called to the Bar in 1671. He had a successful legal practice and became Member of Parliament for Plympton in 1676. He held other important offices and was knighted in 1680 but fell from favour in 1683 and took little part in public affairs until the landing of William of Orange in 1688, following which he rose rapidly again, becoming Lord Chief Justice in 1689. He died in December 1700 in his 58th year.

Sir George had decided to build a mansion near the house where he was born, believed to be the old manor house of Plympton Grange. Whether or not this was within the grounds of the present house is not clear. For some years in the late 17th century he assembled the site, acquiring land from several landowners. The site is on the east side of George Lane, then called Maudlin Street, which at the time had houses on either side. He had plans for the house and grounds and had cleared the site but had made little progress with the building work at the time of his death. His son, (also George) George Treby, who was later Secretary for War and a Privy Councillor, was then only 16 years old, but took over the project as soon as he was able, in about 1715.

The Treby family's estate in the environs of the ancient Borough of Plympton, the Rotten Borough parliamentary constituency of which was known as Plympton Erle, was expanded following the marriage of Judge Treby's father to his mother Joan Snelling, daughter of John Snelling of Chaddle Wood, Plympton (which mansion house survives today after early 1800s rebuilding), and co-heiress to her nephew Francis Snelling. The Treby family's large landholdings within and around the Borough gave them great influence over parliamentary elections, which they shared with the Strode family of Newnham, major local landowners. Of the landed estate formerly attached to Plympton House, only an early 18th-century formal garden of 3 hectares remains.

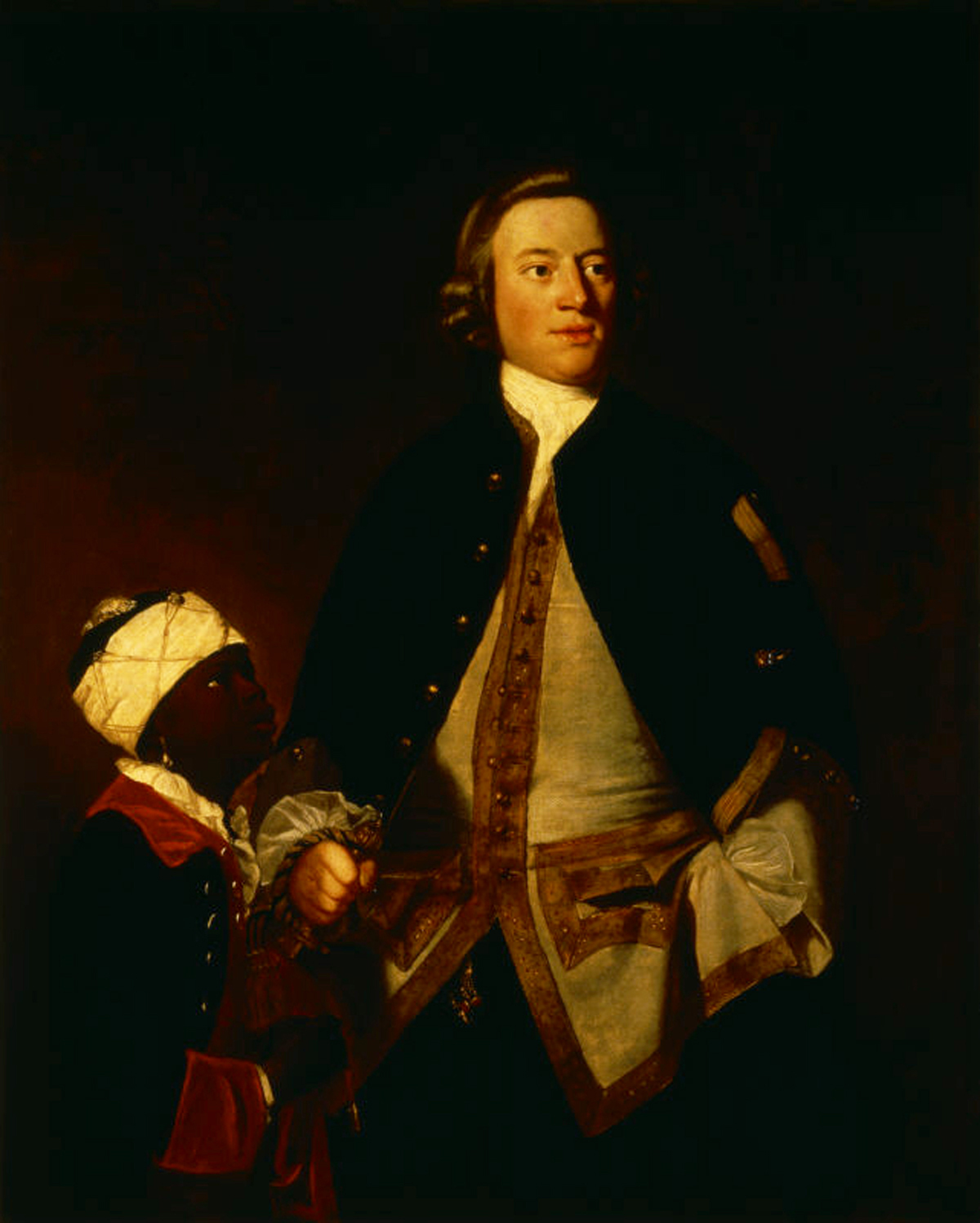
Paul Henry Ourry (1719–1783) of Plympton House, with his African servant "Jersey". Portrait by Sir Joshua Reynolds.

The estate was inherited by George Treby's eldest son, (also George) George Treby (c. 1726 – 1761), also MP for Plympton Erle, who died unmarried, and then passed to his younger brother, Colonel George Hele Treby (c. 1727 – 1763), who also died unmarried and also intestate. It then passed to his sister Charity Treby, daughter of the second George Treby, and wife of Admiral Paul Henry Ourry (1719–1783). Paul Ourry was the second son of Louis Ourry, a Huguenot refugee from Blois in France who had obtained British citizenship in 1713 and a commission in the British army. The estate was later inherited by her son Paul Treby Ourry (1758–1832), who in 1785 by royal licence assumed the surname and arms of Treby, becoming therefore "Paul Treby Treby".

Some time after the death of his mother in 1805, Paul Treby Treby moved to Goodamoor in Plympton St Mary parish and Plympton House was let to a succession of tenants. In 1811, Risdon described the house merely as the property of Paul Treby and in 1821 a guide book, The Panorama of Plymouth, says it was "at present uninhabited". There are conflicting accounts of this period but the house may have been unoccupied for as long as 40 years.

=== Asylum ===
It is reported a Dr Duck became a tenant around this time, using it as a private lunatic asylum. The identity of the mysterious Dr Duck is not clear but it seems that the asylum was set up in 1835 (possibly earlier) with Dr R. C. Langworthy as the proprietor and the 1841 tithe apportionment shows that Plympton House Gardens etc. and Back Lawn (the area north of the house up as far as the Ridgeway) with a total area of 7 3/4 acres, was owned by Laetitia Anne Treby and occupied by Richard Langworthy.

Records of the early years of the asylum in the 1844 report of the Metropolitan Commissioners in Lunacy describe appalling conditions for the patients and it was severely censured by the commissioners. The institution was described as a mansion and outhouses asylum, and it seems that the proprietor and his family lived in some style in the house, while the pauper lunatics (66 in 1844) were housed in the outbuildings, confined in squalid conditions as it seems were some of the private patients, of which there were 17 the same year.

Devon County Asylum was opened in July 1845 and by 1847 conditions had improved. By 1858 the asylum no longer received pauper patients.

In 1876 the Treby family sold the property to Mr Coplestone Lopes Radcliff, who intended to re-develop the land but died before he could proceed, whereupon his son sold it to Dr Charles Aldridge and it continued as an asylum. A prospectus of that date describes the running of the institution. It was promoted as "licensed for the accommodation of insane persons of both sexes of the higher and middle classes". Dr Aldridge was the resident physician and proprietor and Joseph Aldridge the resident superintendent and general manager. The prospectus declared that Plympton House was a hospital rather than a place of detention. Dr Aldridge and his family lived in the house and it was the intention that they should mix freely with the patients and dine with them, and various forms of recreation were provided for the patients.

Plympton House was acquired in 1921 by Dr J. C. Nixon who continued to use it as an asylum until 1933.

=== Convent and Residential Care Home ===
In 1933, coinciding with the sale of the house, it was described in an article in Country Life magazine with photographs. There is probably some artistic licence in the account but it describes the house and garden as having "scarcely been touched since the time it was built, threadbare but with all the bones of its formal garden still intact".

In 1934 the premises were acquired by The Sisters of St Augustine, who established a home for the mentally ill, renaming the house St Peter's Convent. The premises were enlarged over the years, becoming a care home for up to 50 patients, the three Sisters being assisted by 80 staff. Ordnance survey plans of the 1950s show few changes since the establishment of the convent.

By the 1960s the west boundary wall had been rebuilt, set back to allow the widening of George Lane. A recessed gateway had been formed and tree planting introduced replacing the yard to the west of the chapel garden. The chapel was described as such for the first time. A bank is clearly shown on the north side of the link to the chapel. The stable building had been demolished leaving the dairy. The building at the north end of the old service drive had been removed and the present mortuary building erected.

Subsequently, in the 1980s, a further two-storey extension was built between the chapel building and north walled garden to provide accommodation for the Sisters, the track to the north modified and a car park constructed to the west of the chapel garden. In the 1990s the c. 1960s extension on the east side of the house was enlarged and remodelled, with associated landscape works including vehicle access from the south garden.

In 2012 St Peter's Care Home closed, when the 44 bedroom Plympton House, with significant modern additions including an accommodation block and a convent with its own chapel, in all 2984 sq.m (32118 sq.ft), was offered for sale with 5.6 acres of surrounding gardens.

=== Redevelopment ===
By 2015 Plympton House had no permanent use, with the only residents being a team from 'Protects By Occupation' to keep the building secure. In October 2015 a public consultation was launched with the object of bringing Plympton House back into use. The website stated: "The concept is to return the site to a low density residential usage that allows the main house to be restored to its former glory but in a way suitable for use in the 21st century, all the while enhancing the village of Plympton-St-Maurice."

On 31 May 2016 Plymouth City Council granted conditional planning permission for change of use from care home to residential property and a scheme to develop a selection of 14 exclusive three to six bedroom properties was launched. The redevelopment includes some conversions of existing estate buildings and some new builds. Some plots were reserved for self-builders, others were sold as finished properties. Plympton House itself remains as one residence with a private driveway and private gardens.

== Sources ==
- Pevsner, Nikolaus & Cherry, Bridget, The Buildings of England: Devon, London, 2004, p. 684, Plympton House
