= George Treby (younger) =

British politician

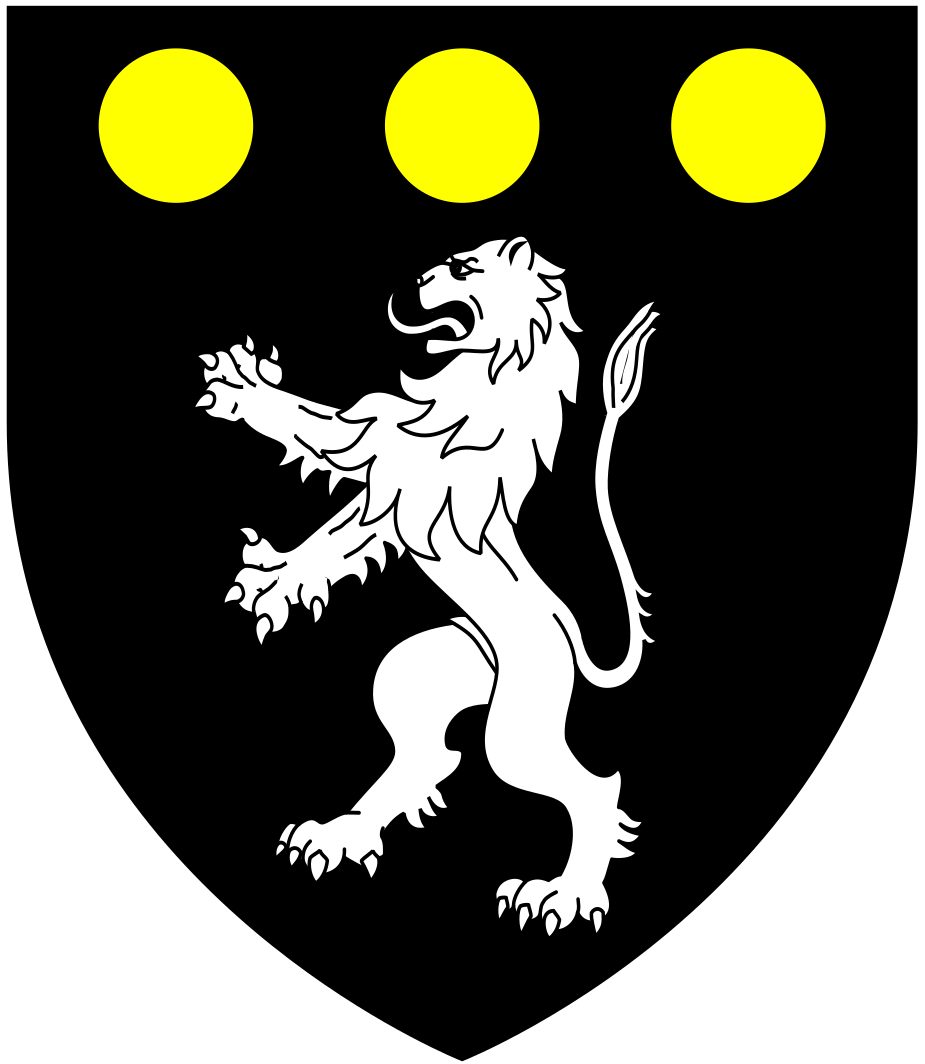
Arms of Treby: Sable, a lion rampant argent in chief three bezants

George III Treby (c.1726 – 5 November 1761) of Plympton House, Plympton St Maurice, Devon, was a British politician.

== Origins ==
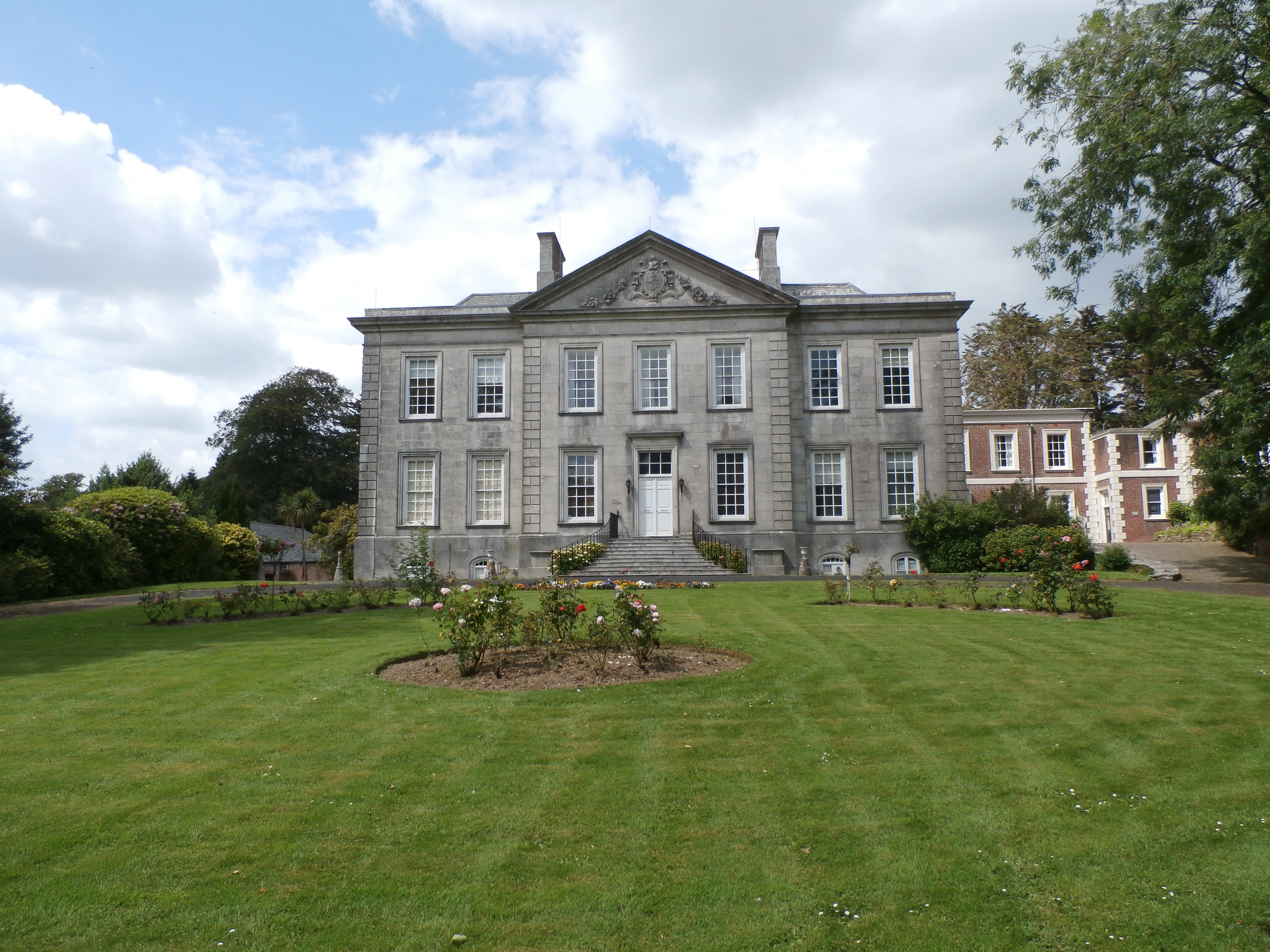
Plympton House

He was the eldest son of George II Treby (c.1684–1742), of Plympton House, Plympton St Maurice, MP for the family's Rotten Borough of Plympton Erle. He inherited Plympton House on his father's death in 1742.

== Career ==
Treby was educated at Exeter College, Oxford. In 1746 he went on the Grand Tour and visited Florence, Rome, and Naples, during which time he is believed to have acquired the Mantuan roundel sold in 2003 to Sheik Saud al-Thani of Qatar.

Treby entered the House of Commons for the family's Rotten Borough of Plympton Erle at a by-election in 1747 to replace Richard Edgcumbe, who had chosen to sit for another borough. The Treby family had great influence in the borough. A government supporter, he was returned again at the 1754 and 1761 elections, but probably did not take his seat after the latter, as he died in November 1761. In the ensuing by-election, he was replaced by his younger brother George Hele Treby (c.1727-1763).

Parliament of Great Britain
Preceded by Richard Edgcumbe; George Edgcumbe	Member of Parliament for Plympton Erle; 1747–1761; With: Sir William Baker	Succeeded by Sir William Baker; George Hele Treby
