= Paul Treby Ourry =

British politician

Paul Treby Ourry (1758–1832) was a British politician who sat in the House of Commons in 1784.

Ourry was the eldest son of Paul Henry Ourry and his wife Charity Treby, daughter of George Treby and was born on 6 November 1758. He was probably educated at Eton College from 1771 to 1774 and matriculated at Christ Church, Oxford in 1775.

Ourry was returned as Member of Parliament for Plympton Erle at the 1784 general election. He resigned his seat in August sixth months later.

Ourry married Laetitia Anne Trelawny, daughter of Sir William Trelawny, 6th Baronet on 14 June 1785. He also changed his name by deed poll to Treby in 1785.

Treby died on 29 February 1832.

Parliament of Great Britain
Preceded by Hon. James Stuart; Sir Ralph Payne	Member of Parliament for Plympton Erle; 1784–1784; With: John Stephenson	Succeeded by John Stephenson; John Pardoe
