= George Hele Treby =

British soldier and politician

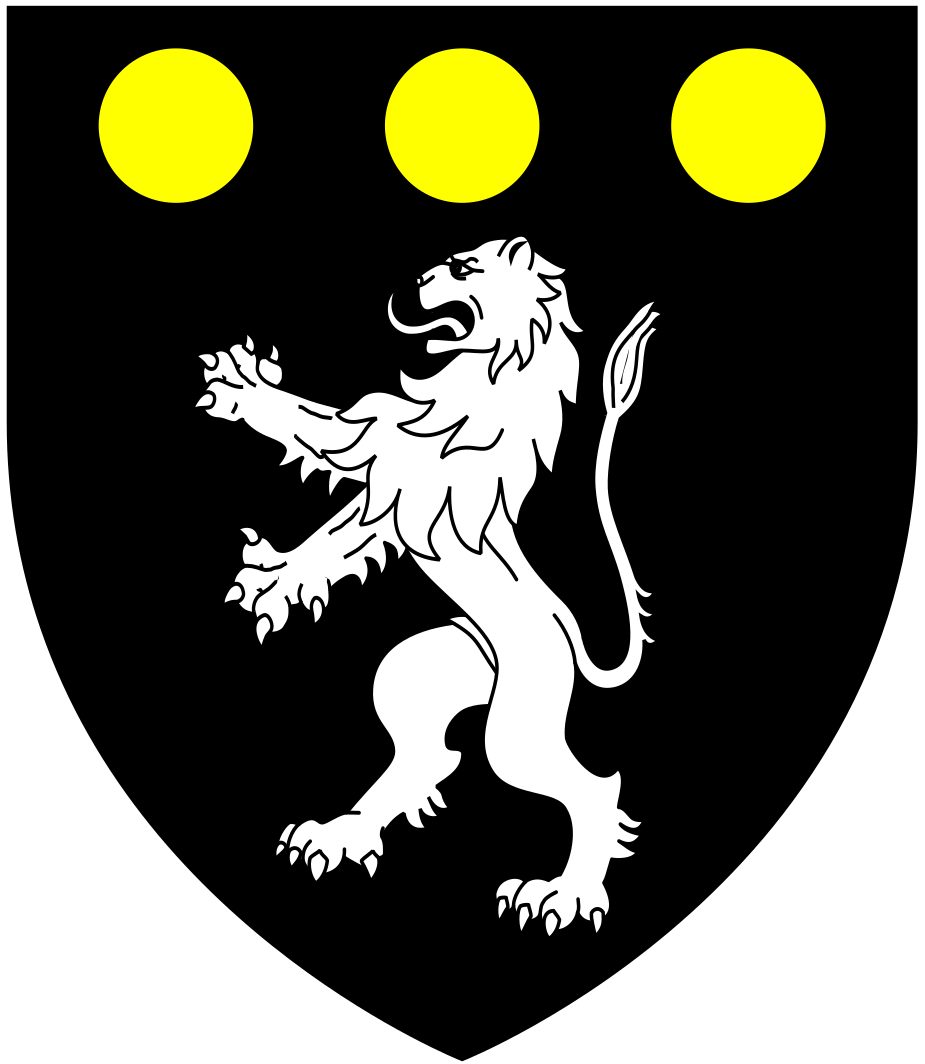
Arms of Treby: Sable, a lion rampant argent in chief three bezants

Lieutenant-Colonel George Hele Treby (c. 1727 – 12 May 1763) was a British soldier and politician from Devonshire.

== Origins ==
He was the younger son of the politician George II Treby (c.1684–10 Mar 1741), of Plympton House, Plympton St Maurice, Devon, MP for the family's Rotten Borough of Plympton Erle, and was the younger brother of George III Treby (c.1726-1761), MP for Plympton Erle.

== Career ==
He was commissioned into the British Army and was promoted to captain and later Lieutenant-Colonel in the 1st Foot Guards in 1758.

Treby entered the House of Commons for Plympton Erle at a by-election in 1761 to replace his elder brother, George III Treby. However, he died in 1763. He was replaced at the following by-election by his brother-in-law, Paul Henry Ourry (1719-1783), who also inherited the Treby family's residence, Plympton House.

Parliament of Great Britain
| Preceded by Sir William Baker; George Treby | Member of Parliament for Plympton Erle; 1761–1763; With: Sir William Baker | Succeeded by Sir William Baker; Paul Henry Ourry |
