= George Treby (politician) =

English Whig politician

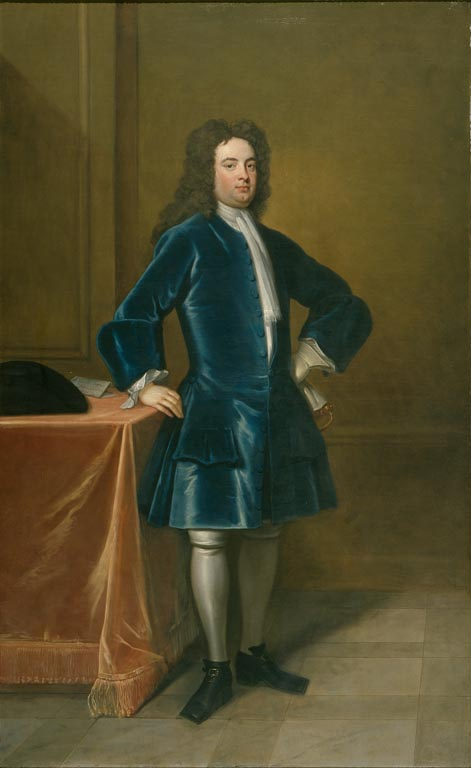
George II Treby (c. 1684–1742), of Plympton House, Secretary of State for War 1718–1724. Portrait c. 1720, School of Godfrey Kneller (1646–1723). British Government Art Collection

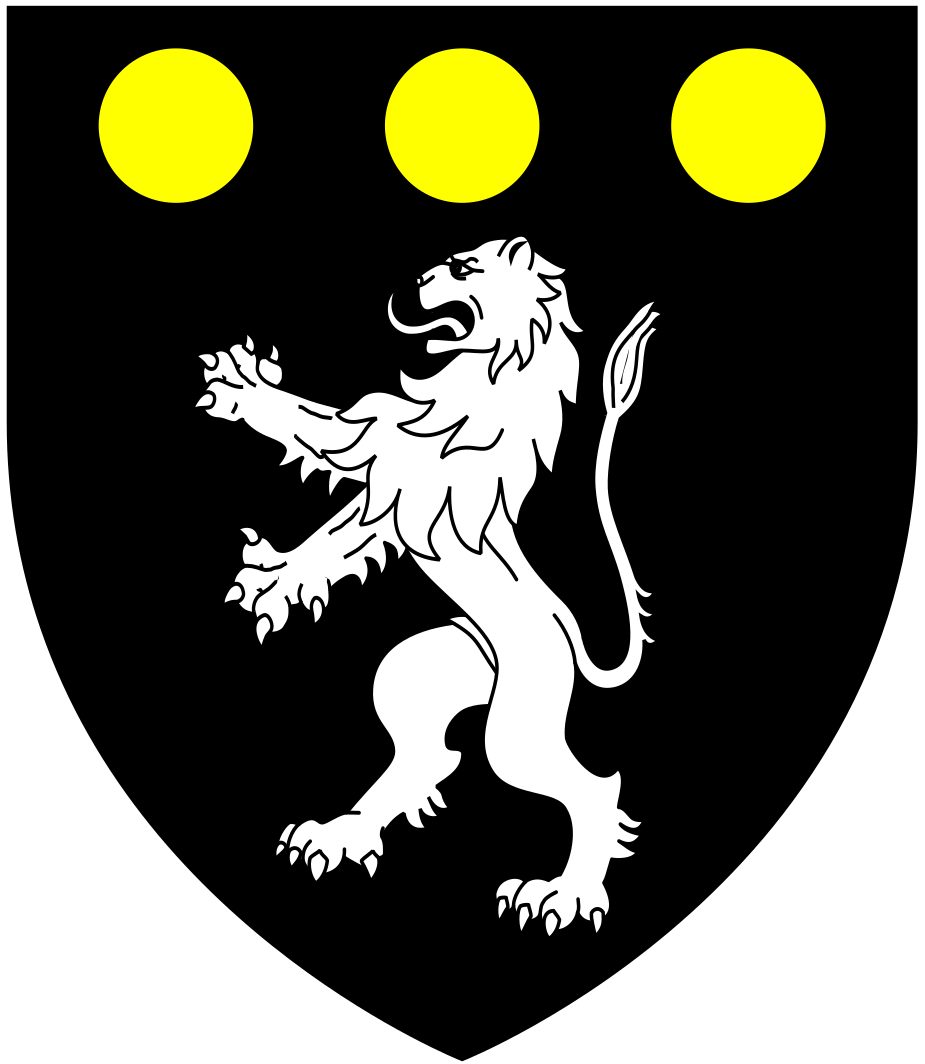
Arms of Treby: Sable, a lion rampant argent in chief three bezants

George Treby (c. 1684–1742) of Plympton House, Plympton St Maurice, Devon, was an English Whig politician who sat in the House of Commons for 34 years from 1708 to 1742. He was Secretary at War from 1718 to 1724, and Master of the Household from 1730 to 1741. He built Plympton House between 1715 and 1720, which his father began and left unfinished at his death in 1700.

== Early life ==
Treby was baptised on 29 October 1685, the eldest son of Sir George Treby, Lord Chief Justice of the Common Pleas, by his third wife Dorothy Grainge. In 1692, he was admitted at Middle Temple. His father died in 1700 and he succeeded to his estates at Plympton. He matriculated at Exeter College, Oxford on 3 April 1701, aged 16.

== Career ==
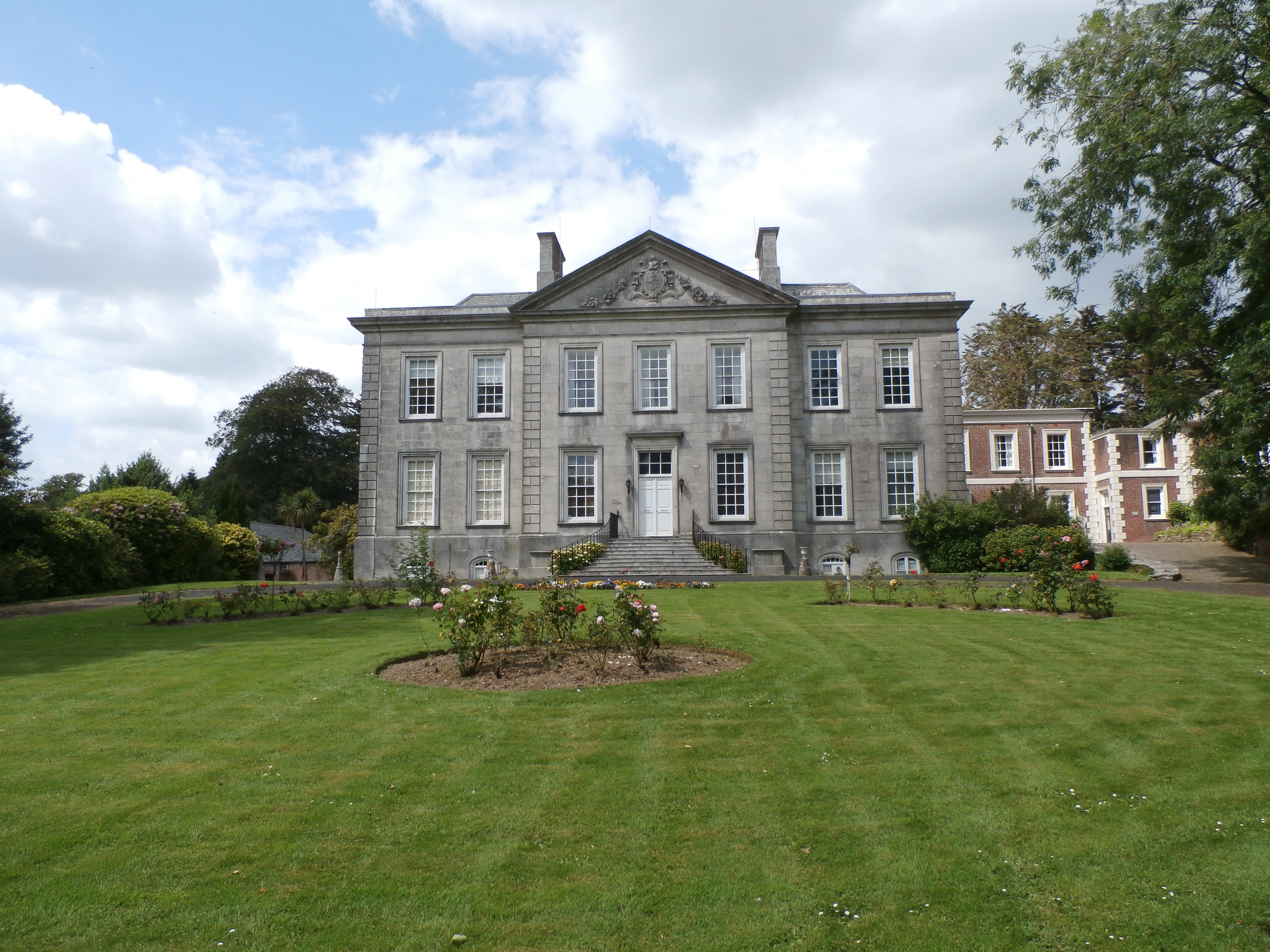
Plympton House, Plympton St Maurice, completed by George II Treby circa 1715–20

Treby was returned unopposed as Whig Member of Parliament for the family's Rotten Borough of Plympton Erle at the 1708 general election, when he was in his early twenties. He took an active part in debates of the House, and acted frequently as a teller on the Whig side. He voted for the naturalization of the Palatines in 1709, and the impeachment of Dr Sacheverell in 1710. He was returned unopposed again at the 1710 British general election and again was a frequent teller for the Whigs. He voted in favour of the motion for ‘No Peace Without Spain’ on 7 December 1711. He was returned unopposed again at the 1713 British general election. He was again a frequent teller, and voted against the expulsion of Richard Steele,

Treby was returned unopposed as MP for Plympton Erle at the 1715 British general election and was a Commissioner for forfeited estates from June 1716 to 1719. In 1718 he was appointed Secretary at War. He was returned again at the 1722. In 1724, Walpole wanted to give post of Secretary of War to Pelham, and got rid of Treby in 1724 making him Teller of the Exchequer. At the accession of King George, Treby was deprived of his post in the Tellership, and at the 1727 British general election, he was returned as MP for Dartmouth. He was appointed Master of the Household in 1730 and held the post until 1740. He was returned unopposed for Dartmouth at the 1734 British general election when he was election manager for several other Devon constituencies. In 1740 he became a Lord of the Treasury. He was returned again at the 1741 British general election but was turned out of his post on the fall of Walpole in February 1742.

In about 1715 to 1720 he completed building Plympton House, the grand new country residence begun by his father.

== Marriage and progeny ==
Treby married Charity Hele at St James, Westminster. She was the daughter and co-heiress of Roger Hele of Holwell, in the parish of Newton Ferrers, Devon. Her sister was Juliana Hele, wife of Peregrine Osborne, 3rd Duke of Leeds (1691–1731). By Charity he had 2 sons and 2 daughters:

- George III Treby (c.1726–1761), eldest son and heir, MP for Plympton Erle 1747–1761, died unmarried.
- Lt.Col. George Hele Treby (c.1727–1763), 2nd son, MP for Plympton Erle 1761–1763, died unmarried.
- Ann(e) Treby, who married Benjamin Hay(e)s in 1756. She was the heiress of Delamore in the parish of Cornwood, which estate had been purchased by her father. She had a son and heir:
  - Treby Hele Hay(e)s (1764–1837)

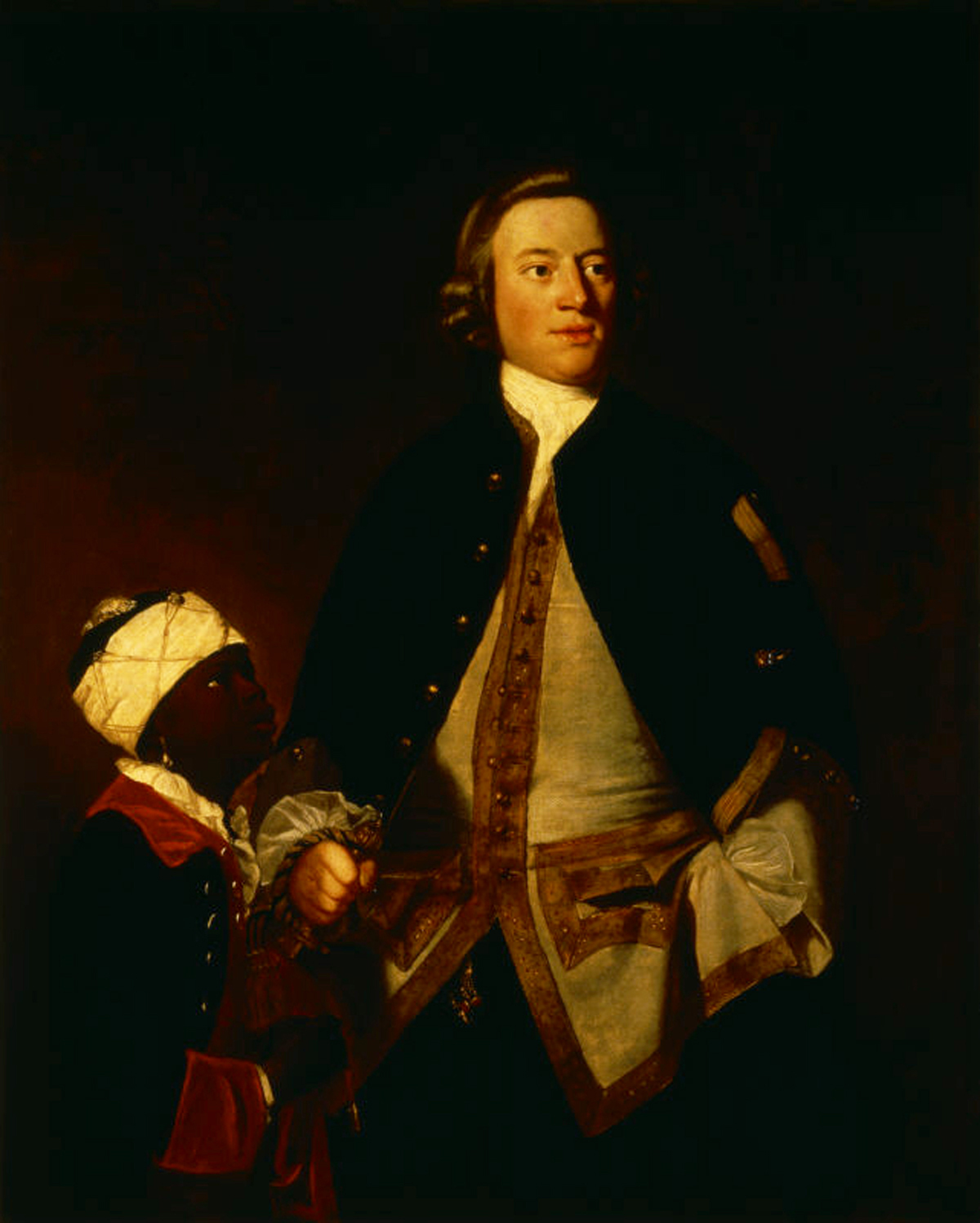
Admiral Paul Henry Ourry (1719–1783), MP, of Plympton House, with 'Jersey'. Portrait by Sir Joshua Reynolds (1723–1792). Collection of Saltram House, Plympton, property of National Trust

- Charity Treby, wife of Paul Ourry (1719–1783), MP for Plympton Erle 1763–1775 and from 1775 Commissioner of Plymouth Dockyard. Paul Ourry was the second son of Louis Ourry, a Huguenot refugee from Blois in France who had obtained British citizenship in 1713 and a commission in the British army. A portrait of Paul Ourry by Sir Joshua Reynolds (1723–1792), his contemporary and a native of Plympton and friend of the Parker family of Saltram, exists in the collection of Saltram House, Plympton. The following story is related of an ancestress of the Ourry family: Towards the end of the 18th century, Carry Ourry, a great Cornish beauty, and an ancestress of the Trebys of Plympton and Goodamoor, had walked into the Assize Court at Bodmin, when Jekyll, catching sight of her, wrote the following lines and handed them up to the judge:

"My lord, and gemmen of the jury,
I come to prosecute before ye,
A noted felon I'll assure ye,
Known by the name of Carry Ourry,
Known by a guilty pair of eyes,
Known by a thousand felonies,
Known to push her crime still further,
Guilty of killing, stabbing, murder,
But to be brief and cut it shorter,
I'll but indict her for manslaughter."

Charity had a son:

  - Paul Treby Ourry (1758–1832), of Goodamoor House, Plympton St Mary, Devon, MP for Plympton Erle in 1784. He inherited the estate of Plympton House, and in accordance with the terms of the bequest, in 1785 by royal licence assumed the surname of Treby. He was a well-known fox-hunter, "One of the best friends to fox-hunting the Dartmoor country ever knew", and a friend of the famous "Hunting Parson" Jack Russell and was "a classic scholar, and a rare specimen of a high-minded English gentleman". He invented a plan for artificial fox earths, which would be used to breed a ready supply of captive foxes which could be released when a shortage of wild foxes precluded the enjoyment of his favourite pastime. He sold the estate of Wimpstone (the original English seat of the Fortescue family) in Modbury, Devon, to Mr Pretty John, who built a new mansion house there. Following his death in 1832 Plympton House was sold to Copleston Lopes Radcliffe. Also in 1832 ended the family's source of political power from its association with "The old borough of Plympton, the stronghold of the Treby family, till the brush of the Reform Bill swept away its charter". He married Laetitia Trelawny, daughter of Sir William Trelawny, 6th Baronet, MP, by whom he had 4 sons and 4 daughters including:
    - Paul Ourry Treby (b.1786), eldest son, of Goodamoor House
    - Henry Hele Treby (b.1799), heir to his brother
    - Caroline Treby, who married Thomas John Phillips, whose son was Major General Paul Winsloe Phillips (b.1824), Royal Regiment of Artillery, of Goodamoor House, who assumed the surname Treby in 1877 following his inheritance of the Treby estates.

In 1873 Miss Blanche Treby of Goodamoor House in the parish of Plympton St Mary was one of the major landowners in that parish and was also lord of the manor of Plympton St Maurice, in which is situated Plympton House.

== Notes ==
Parliament of Great Britain
| Preceded by Richard Edgcumbe; Sir John Cope | Member of Parliament for Plympton Erle; 1708–1727; With: Richard Edgcumbe | Succeeded by Richard Edgcumbe; John Fuller |
| Preceded by George Treby III; Thomas Martyn | Member of Parliament for 1727–1742; With: Walter Carey | Succeeded by Lord Archibald Hamilton; Walter Carey |
Court offices
| Preceded by Sir Conyers Darcy | Master of the Household; 1730–1741 | Succeeded by Sir John Harris |
