= Boston Jersey =

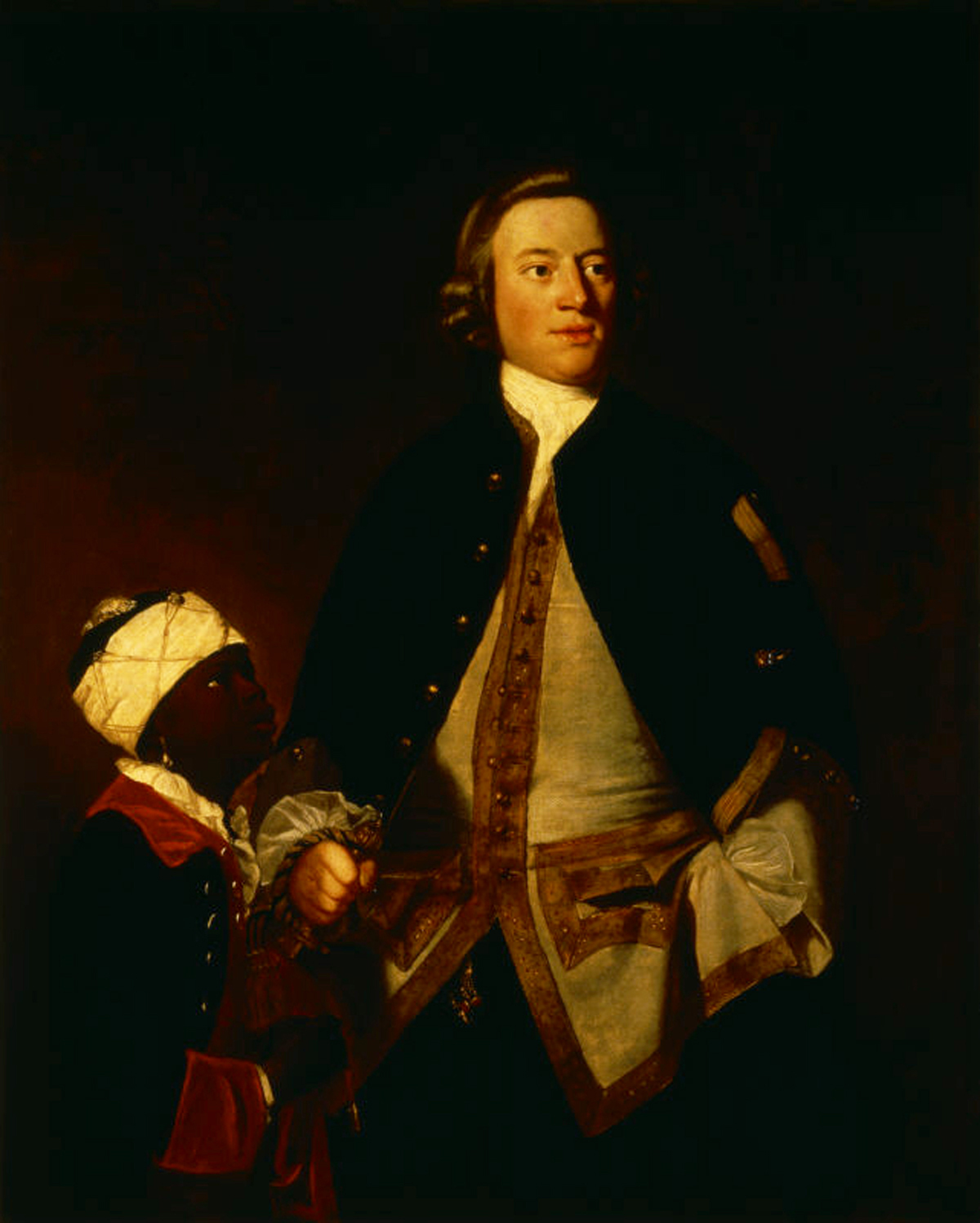
- Portrait of Jersey (left) and his owner, Paul Henry Ourry (right), by Joshua Reynolds
- Born: 1736 or 1737
- Died: after 1753
- Other name: George Walker
- Occupation: sailor

Boston Jersey (1736 or 1737 – after 1753) was a Royal Navy sailor and servant enslaved by British officer and politician, Paul Henry Ourry. Jersey, who was of African descent, was also known by the Christian name George Walker after his 1752 baptism. He is best known for the 1748 depiction of him as a child by portraitist Joshua Reynolds.

Little of Jersey's life is known with certainty, and nothing more than his name was known before a joint research team from Britain's National Trust, National Gallery and Royal Museums Greenwich published additional biographical details in 2026.

== Early life ==
His forename hints that, as a child, he may have lived or been born in Boston in the British Province of Massachusetts Bay. His surname Jersey may reflect Ourry's connection to that Channel Island.

When he was about eleven, Jersey posed beside Ourry for a portrait by renowned oil painter Joshua Reynolds. Ourry, dressed in his naval uniform, stares into the distance, while Jersey, dressed in exotic robes and a brilliant white turban, gazes up at his master, a composition meant to evoke the power and ambitions of the emergent British Empire. Reynolds's portrait of Jersey, in particular, is described as "extremely well painted". As of 2026, the painting is displayed in Saltram House, a stately Georgian home in Plymouth.

== Naval service ==
Admiralty archives show that he served on three different ships with Ourry: HMS Salisbury, Monmouth and Deptford. Beyond serving Ourry personally as a slave, Jersey was recorded as a crew member, achieving the rank of able seaman by December 1748 when he boarded Monmouth. A 1751 muster records him being due for discharge "per paybook", suggesting he was paid for his service to the navy, although it's unclear if he was paid directly or through Ourry. The last known record of Jersey is his 1753 discharge from Deptford in Menorca.

It's also known that Jersey was baptised at the age of fifteen on 30 July 1752, probably in the chapel at Westminster. The baptismal certificate records his Christian name as George Walker; it's unknown if he used that name prior to his baptism.

No records of Jersey were found from after August 1753, and he does not appear in the logs of other ships on which Ourry served. Researchers speculate that he could have gained his freedom, or may have been sold to another slaveholder.
