= Paul Henry Ourry =

Royal Navy officer and politician

Captain Paul Henry Ourry
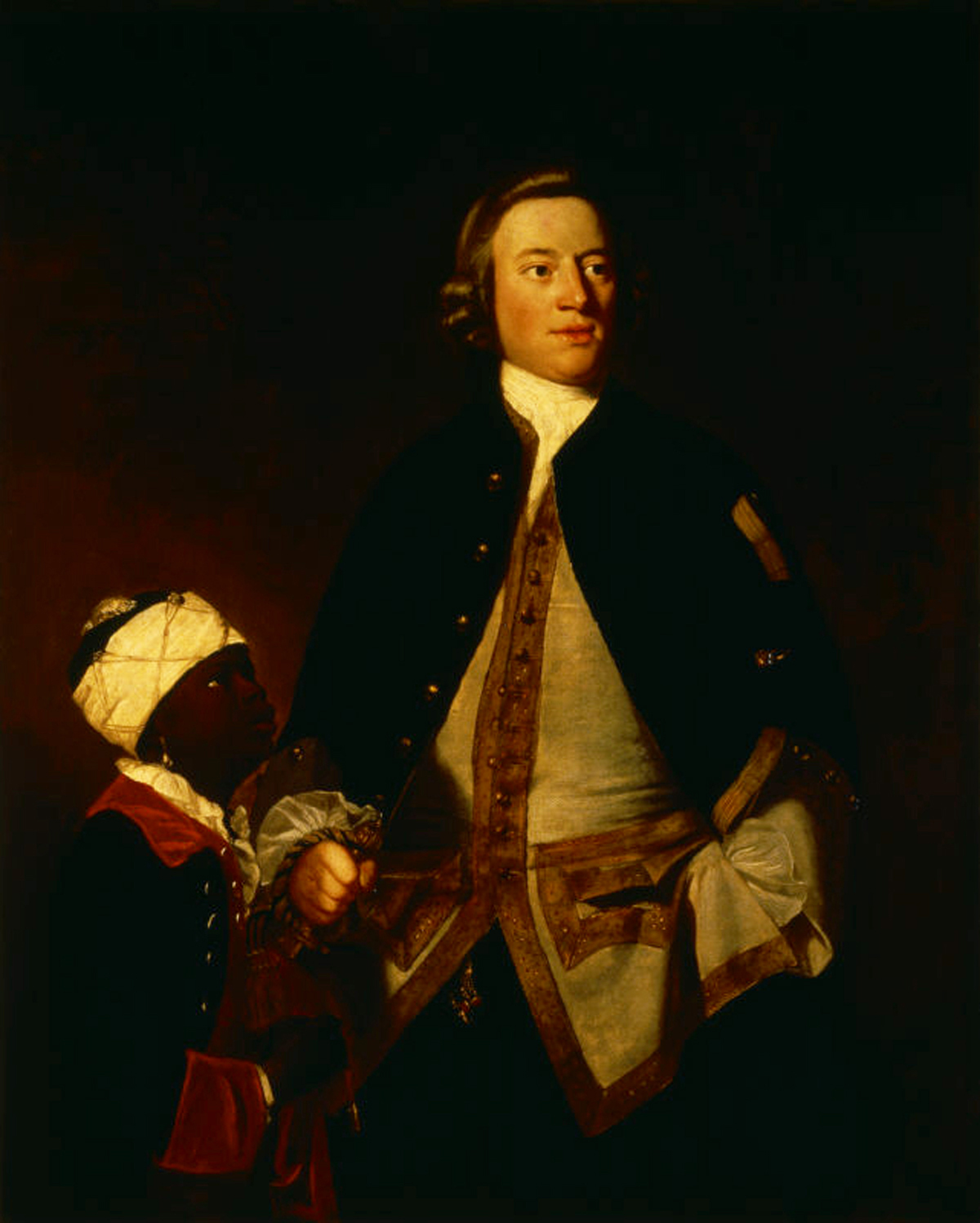
- Portrait of Ourry and his Black servant Jersey by Joshua Reynolds
- Born: 3 October 1719; Great Britain
- Died: 31 January 1783 (aged 63); Great Britain
- Military career
- Allegiance: Great Britain
- Branch: Royal Navy
- Service years: c.1742–1783
- Rank: Captain
- Commands: HMS Success; HMS Actaeon; HMS Hero; HMS Firm; HMS Dublin; HMS Fame; Commissioner of Plymouth Dockyard
- Conflicts: War of the Austrian Succession; Battle of Toulon; Seven Years' War; Raid on St Malo; Capture of Belle Île; American Revolutionary War
- Other work: Member of Parliament for Plympton Erle

Captain Paul Henry Ourry (3 October 1719 – 31 January 1783) was a Royal Navy officer and politician who represented Plympton Erle in the House of Commons of Great Britain from 1763 to 1775.

== Early life ==
Ourry was the second son of Louis Ourry, a Huguenot of Blois and his wife Anne Louise Beauvais, daughter of Louis Beauvais and was born on 3 October 1719.

== Naval career ==
Ourry joined the Royal Navy and was Lieutenant in 1742 serving on HMS Elizabeth from 1742 to 1744 and saw action at the Battle of Toulon. From 1746 to 1748 he served on HMS Salisbury. In about 1748 Joshua Reynolds painted a portrait described by the National Trust as Lieutenant, later Captain, Paul Henry Ourry, MP (1719–1783) with an enslaved child known as 'Jersey' (dates unknown). Nothing was known about the boy, then aged about 11, until details of his life were researched in 2026; he was found recorded as "Boston Jersey" on ships that Ourry was attached to, as servant and later possibly as crew member, but disappeared from the records in 1753.

Ourry married Charity Treby, daughter of George Treby MP, former secretary at war, on 26 August 1749. From 1751 to 1752 he served on HMS Monmouth and from 1752 to 1756 on HMS Deptford He was promoted to Master and Commander in 1756 and awarded command of the fireship HMS Proserpine, then at anchor at Port Mahon. War with France broke out in May 1756, while Ourry was en route to Port Mahon to assume command of his vessel. The French seized Proserpine before Ourry arrived, and he was forced to return to England and petition the Navy Board for an alternative command. After some delays Ourry was appointed to command the newly built sixth-rate frigate HMS Success from early 1757. However, family matters had since arisen that required him to seek a leave of absence for travel to Halifax, West Yorkshire. The Navy was reluctant to grant the request, and Ourry only obtained leave after the intervention of John Clevland, the Secretary to the Admiralty and a friend of Ourry's family. A subsequent request for additional leave was flatly refused with advice from Admiralty that "his service is wanted and is so pressing that the Lords will not permit any other action that can occasion a moment's delay."

In June 1758 Ourry took part in the landing at Cancale Bay. He commanded HMS Actaeon from 1759 to 1763 and took part in the Expedition against Belle Île in June 1761 and in operations in Martinique in February 1762. In 1763 he became a Member of Parliament but continued in service for several years. From 1763 to 1767 he commanded HMS Hero. His last three commands were the fourth- and third-rate ships of the line HMS Firm between 1770 and 1771, HMS Dublin from 1771 to 1773 and HMS Fame between 1770 and 1772.

== Political career ==
The Treby family had an interest at Plympton Erle where his brother in law George Hele Treby was MP until his death in 1763. Ourry was returned in succession to him as MP for Plympton Erle at a by-election on 25 November 1763. He was returned for Plymton Erle unopposed in 1768 and 1774. In Parliament he supported every Administration but does not appear to have spoken in the House. He was appointed Commissioner for Plymouth Dockyard in January 1775 and vacated his seat.

== Later life ==
Ourry died on 31 January 1783. His son Paul Treby Ourry was also MP for Plympton Erle. His daughter Charity was married to Montagu Edmund Parker and his daughter Caroline to Sir William Molesworth, 6th Baronet.

Parliament of Great Britain
Preceded by (Sir) William Baker; George Hele Treby	Member of Parliament for Plympton Erle; 1763–1775; With: (Sir) William Baker; William Baker; Sir Richard Philipps, Bt	Succeeded by Sir Richard Philipps, Bt; John Durand
