= Battle of Sourton Down =

1643 battle of the First English Civil War

- Part of the First English Civil War
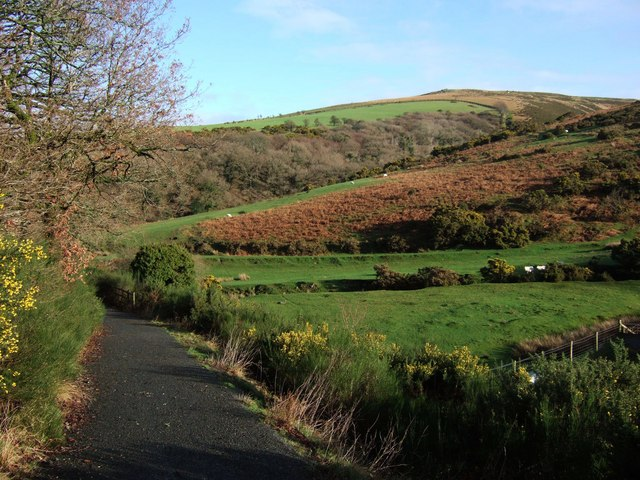
- Sourton Down; the hedges and landscape helped the Parliamentarian ambush
Date	25 April 1643
Location	near Okehampton, Devon 50.705°N 4.060°W
Result	Parliamentarian victory

Belligerents
Royalists	Parliamentarians

Commanders and leaders
Sir Ralph Hopton; Lord Mohun; Sir Bevil Grenville; Sir Nicholas Slanning	James Chudleigh

Strength
c. 3,000 infantry; 300 cavalry; 300 dragoons; 4 guns	c. 108 cavalry; 1,000 infantry

Casualties and losses
60 dead	Minimal

The Battle of Sourton Down took place on 25 April 1643, near Sourton, in Devon, during the First English Civil War. A Parliamentarian force under James Chudleigh defeated a Royalist army under Sir Ralph Hopton. Casualties on both sides were light, and the result had little impact on the strategic position in the West Country.

Hoping to surprise their opponents, the Royalist army undertook a night march on the Parliamentarian base in Okehampton. However, they in turn were ambushed by a small force of cavalry led by Chudleigh, and routed. Hopton was forced to abandon most of his baggage and supplies, but won a decisive battle at Stratton three weeks later.

== Background ==
When the First English Civil War began in August 1642, Cornwall was generally more supportive of the Royalist cause, while Devon and Somerset were sympathetic towards Parliament, though significant opposition existed in both areas.

In July, Charles named the Marquess of Hertford commander in the west, with Sir Ralph Hopton as his deputy. They established headquarters at Wells, but threatened by a larger Parliamentarian army under the Earl of Bedford, retreated to Minehead. Hopton advised Hertford to take the infantry and artillery across the water to South Wales, while he and some 80 others joined Cornish Royalists near Truro. Overall command was split between Hopton and William Ashburnham, with Sir John Berkeley in charge of logistics. However, their small army consisted mostly of local trained bands, reluctant to serve outside Cornwall, or under non-Cornish "foreigners"; this meant prominent roles for three locals, Sir Bevil Grenville, Sir Nicholas Slanning, and John Trevanion.

Parliamentarian supporters in Devon also raised troops, initially commanded by the Earl of Pembroke. James Chudleigh, son of a Devon landowner, was authorised to levy "1,000 dragoons ... in Somerset, Devon, and Cornwall"; these were used to reinforce the garrison at Barnstaple in north Devon in December 1642. The Earl of Stamford was given command of Parliament's army in the West Country in January 1643, and appointed Chudleigh his deputy.

== Prelude ==
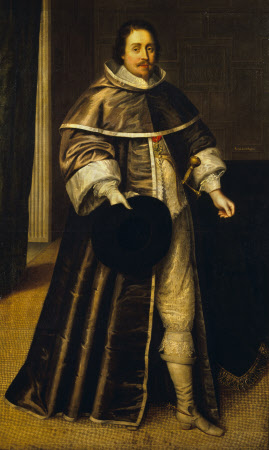
Sir Ralph Hopton, Royalist commander at Sourton Down

Victory at the Battle of Braddock Down in January 1643 secured Royalist control of Cornwall, and established Hopton as commander in the west. He wanted to attack Plymouth, but the city could easily be reinforced by sea, and the Cornish militia refused to cross the River Tamar into Devon. After some minor skirmishes, the two sides agreed a local truce in late February, allowing Hopton to retreat into Cornwall; this truce was greeted with incredulity by William Waller, Parliamentarian commander in the west, who argued it primarily benefited the Royalists.

Anticipating the end of the truce on 22 April, Chudleigh assembled around 1,600 troops at Lifton, near Launceston, where Hopton had concentrated his army. He attacked at around 10:00 am the next morning, taking the Royalists by surprise, but they quickly recovered and, faced by superior numbers, Chudleigh withdrew to his base at Okehampton. Hopton did not pursue him, noting that, as usual after a battle, his Cornish soldiers "grew disorderly and mutinous".

On reaching Okehampton, some of Chudleigh's units departed, leaving him 1,000 infantry, and three or four troops of dragoons. This was interpreted as a general retreat; Hopton later recorded "there came a friend from Okehampton, who assured us the enemy was in very great disquiet and fear." Hoping to take advantage, he left Launceston with 3,000 infantry, 300 cavalry and 300 dragoons. The column was led by 300 dragoons and cavalry, then half the infantry, with their four guns in the centre. The rest of the infantry followed, with the remaining dragoons and cavalry in the rear. They intended to stop for the night at Sourton Down, then attack Okehampton at dawn.

By chance, they were spotted by a Parliamentarian quartermaster, who informed Chudleigh at around 9:00 pm that the enemy was only two miles (3 km) away. In his subsequent report, Chudleigh complained that "by the intolerable neglect of our lying deputy Scout Master, we were surprised by the whole enemy body of horse and foot." Additionally, the artillery transport had been taken to Crediton against his orders and, unwilling to abandon the guns saved at Launceston, Chudleigh planned a counterattack.

== Battle ==

Leaving his 1,000 infantry to follow, Chudleigh took his 108 cavalry out to Sourton Down, where he found a valley backed by hills high enough to avoid being silhouetted. He split them into six squadrons of eighteen, and they spread out to wait. The Royalists were unaware of the threat; Hopton later admitted he and his senior officers were "carelessly entertaining themselves" at the head of the column, when the ambush was sprung at around 11:00 pm.

Chudleigh ordered his men to make as much noise as possible, to make it appear that they were a far larger force. The first attack was led by Captain Thomas Drake, whose squadron charged out of the darkness shouting and firing their weapons. Predominantly new levies, the Royalist dragoons broke, sweeping away the cavalry behind them, along with Hopton himself. The attack coincided with a violent thunderstorm; panicked by the noise and lights, the Cornish infantry broke, many throwing away their weapons as they ran. Chudleigh's cavalry initially overwhelmed the Royalist artillery, until Slanning was able to regain the guns, and establish a defensive position amongst ancient earthworks on the moor, reinforced with sharpened wooden stakes.

Chudleigh used his cavalry to prevent the Royalists from regrouping, and waited for his infantry reinforcements to come up from Okehampton before attacking Slanning. As they approached, the Royalist artillery spotted their lit matches and opened fire, scattering the Parliamentarian infantry. Outnumbered, and having achieved his main objective, Chudleigh ordered his men to hang lit matches in gorse bushes to make it appear that they were still there, and withdrew. Uncertain as to the size of the attacking force, the Royalists held their position until daybreak, then retreated, first to Bridestowe, a village about two miles (3.2 km) south-west of Sourton Down, and then later that day back to Launceston.

== Aftermath ==
Do you not know, not a fortnight agoe,
How they brag'd of a Western wonder?
When a hundred and ten, slew five thousand men,
With the help of Lightning and Thunder.

There Hopton was slain, again and again,
Or else my Author did lye;
With a new Thanksgiving, for who are living,
To God, and his Servant Chudleigh. — Sir John Denham, A Western Wonder

The Royalists abandoned most of their supplies and stores, including Hopton's personal baggage. This contained letters from Charles, ordering him to join forces with the Marquess of Hertford and Prince Maurice in Somerset. However, their losses were relatively minor, somewhere between 20 and 100 dead, wounded or captured. (Note: Historians estimate that during the Civil War, battlefield deaths were outnumbered more than two-to-one by other deaths related to the war; due to the poor living conditions, effects of sieges and the lack of good medical care.)

Despite his absence, Parliamentarian pamphlets credited Stamford for the victory, a rare piece of good news in the West Country. (Note: Published as 'A true relation of the wonderful victory obtained by Parliamentarian forces under the Earl of Stamford.') As was common practice on both sides, these were largely fictitious propaganda; one report suggested Hopton died after "being shot in the back in his flight". In response, the Royalist poet Sir John Denham wrote a satirical piece titled A Western Wonder, mocking these reports, and praising the subsequent Royalist victory at Stratton.

The capture of Hopton's instructions reportedly led to Stamford "leap(ing) out of [his] chair for joy", believing this was an opportunity for a decisive victory. He raised the largest field army he could, stripping garrisons throughout Devon, and bringing reinforcements from Somerset, to fight what he believed would be "the deciding contest of the war for the West". However, in May, he was defeated by Hopton in the Battle of Stratton, securing Royalist control of Cornwall and Devon, including Exeter, which Stamford surrendered in September. Hopton advanced into Somerset, forcing Parliament to send an army under Sir William Waller, into the south-west to counter him.
