= Sir George Chudleigh, 4th Baronet =

English landowner and baronet

Sir George Chudleigh, 4th Baronet (c. 1683 – 10 October 1738) of Haldon House near Exeter, was an English landowner and baronet.

== Early life ==
Chudleigh was born in Ashton, Devon in c. 1683. He was the son of Sir George Chudleigh, 3rd Baronet (c. 1644–1718) and the former Mary Lee (1656–1710), a poet of feminist essays. Among his siblings was younger brother Col. Thomas Chudleigh, Lt.-Gov. of Chelsea College who married Henrietta Clifford and lost most of his fortune in the South Sea Bubble; and sister Eliza Maria Chudleigh.

His paternal grandparents were Sir George Chudleigh, 2nd Baronet and Elizabeth Fortescue (a daughter of Hugh Fortescue). (Note: Through his maternal grandmother (a daughter of Hugh Fortescue (1592–1661), his father was a first cousin of Hugh Fortescue (1665–1719), of Filleigh and Weare Giffard Hall in Devon and of Ebrington Manor in Gloucestershire, was a Whig politician who sat in the English and British House of Commons between 1689 and 1713.) Among his extended family were great-uncles John Chudleigh, MP for East Looe, and James Chudleigh, a military commander killed in the First English Civil War. His great-aunt, Mary Chudleigh (second daughter of the 1st Baronet), married Col. Hugh Clifford, parents of Thomas Clifford, 1st Baron Clifford of Chudleigh. His niece, Elizabeth Chudleigh, married Vice-Admiral Augustus Hervey, 3rd Earl of Bristol, in 1744. They were divorced in 1769 a mensa et thoro and she married Evelyn Pierrepont, 2nd Duke of Kingston-upon-Hull, ultimately leading her to be found guilty of bigamy in 1776 and living abroad in exile until her death. His maternal grandparents were Richard Lee of Winslade, Devon and Mary Sydenham of Westminster.

== Career ==
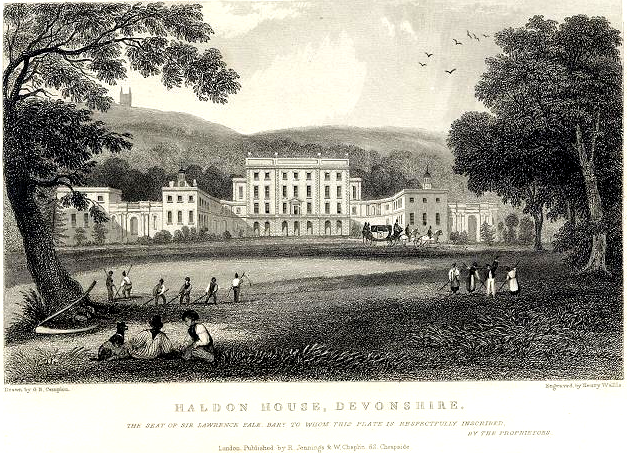
Haldon House, east front, 1830 engraving.

Upon the death of his father in 1718, he succeeded as the 4th Baronet Chudleigh, a title in the Baronetage of England that had been purchased on 1 August 1622 by his great-grandfather, George Chudleigh, MP for St Michael's, East Looe, Lostwithiel and Tiverton.

Chudleigh built Haldon House, a large Georgian country house on the eastern side of the Haldon Hills in the parishes of Dunchideock and Kenn, near Exeter in Devon, England. Reportedly, it was influenced by Buckingham House in London, built in about 1715. Chudleigh's ancestral seat was at nearby Ashton House, on the west side of Haldon Hill, the residence of his family since about 1320, and which he abandoned to build Haldon House on the east side of the hill.

== Personal life ==
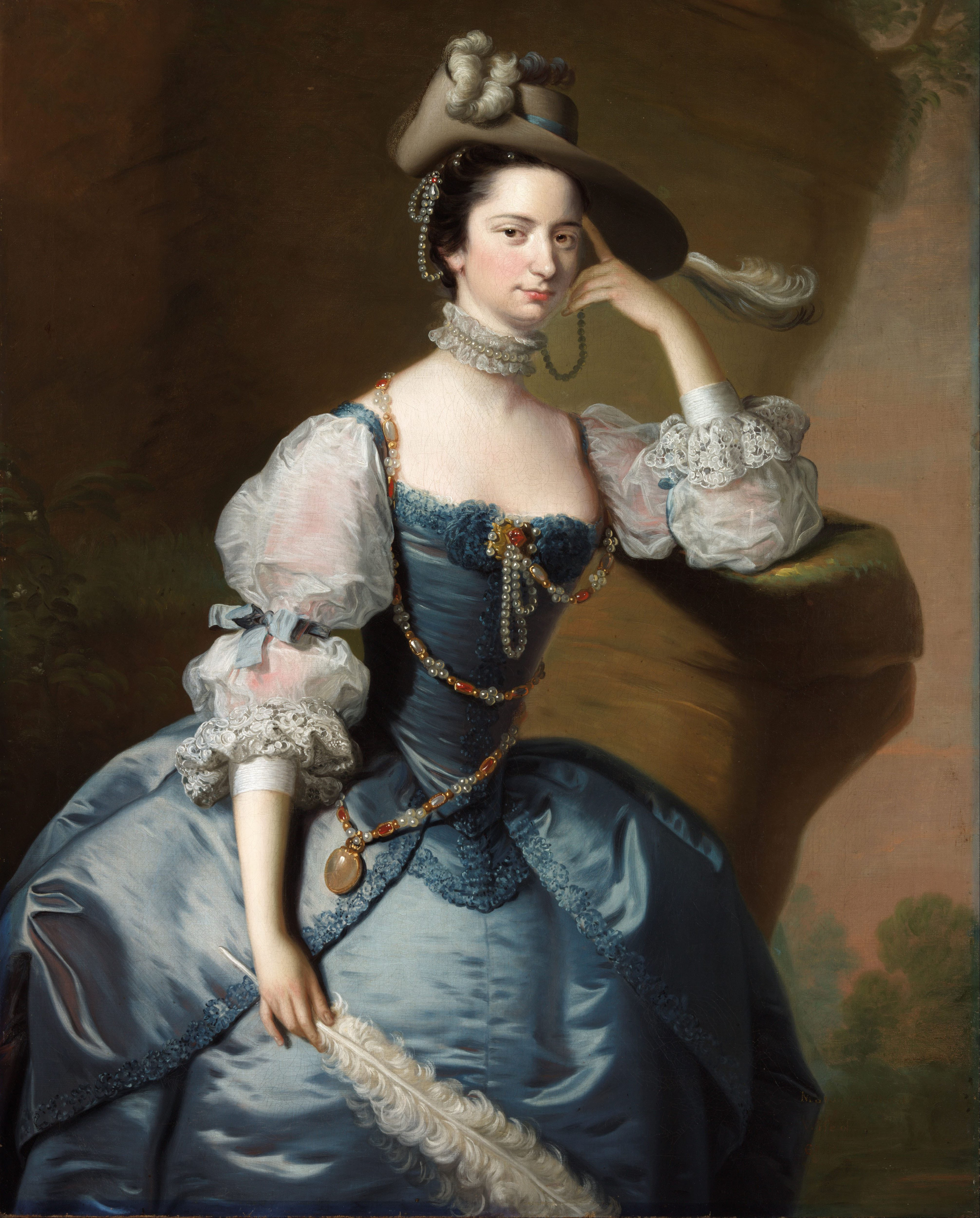
Portrait of his daughter, Margaret, Lady Oxenden, by Thomas Hudson, c. 1755-1756

Chudleigh was married to Frances Davie (1697–1748), one of the four daughters and co-heiresses of Sir William Davie, 4th Baronet of Creedy, Sandford, Devon, and, his second wife, Abigail Pollexfen (a daughter of merchant John Pollexfen). Together, they were the parents of:

- Mary Chudleigh (1715–1751), who married Humphrey Prideaux, Sheriff of Cornwall and son of Edmund Prideaux of Prideaux Place, and Hannah Wrench (a daughter of Sir Benjamin Wrench of Norwich).
- Frances Chudleigh (1718–c. 1752), who married Sir John Chichester, 5th Baronet, son of Sir John Chichester, 4th Baronet and Anne Leigh (a daughter of John Leigh, MP for Newport).
- Elizabeth Chudleigh (b. 1720)
- Margaret Chudleigh (1724–1803), who married Sir Henry Oxenden, 6th Baronet, son of Sir George Oxenden, 5th Baronet, MP for Sandwich, and Elizabeth Dunch (the daughter of Edmund Dunch, the Master of the Royal Household to Queen Anne).

Chudleigh died at Ashton on 10 October 1738, leaving four daughters who were co-heiresses. His second daughter, Frances, inherited Haldon and Ashton. (Note: Since Sir John Chichester, 5th Baronet already had a grand seat at Youlston Park in North Devon, his daughter, Lady Chichester, sold Haldon House to Anne (née Prideaux) Basset (1718–1760). a daughter and co-heiress of Sir Edmund Prideaux, 5th Baronet of Netherton, and the widow of John Pendarvis Basset (1713–1739) of Tehidy in Cornwall) The title, however, passed to his nephew, Thomas Chudleigh, who died unmarried in 1741 and then to John Chudleigh, (Note: Sir John Chudleigh, 6th Baronet (d. 1745), the 4th Baronet's first cousin, was the only son of his uncle, George Chudleigh and Isabella Garniere. He was killed during the Siege of Ostend at Ostend, Belgium during the War of Austrian Succession.) who died in 1745 after which the title became extinct.

=== Descendants ===
Through his daughter Frances, he was posthumously a grandfather of Sir John Chichester, 6th Baronet (c. 1752–1808) of Youlston Park, the High Sheriff of Devon who died unmarried.

Through his daughter Margaret, he was posthumously a grandfather of Sir Henry Oxenden, 7th Baronet (1756–1838) of Broome Park, who married Mary Graham (the daughter of Col. John Graham, of St. Lawrence House, near Canterbury).

Baronetage of England
Preceded by George Chudleigh	Baronet (of Ashton); 1718–1738	Succeeded by Thomas Chudleigh
