= Chudleigh Fort =

Ornamental fort in Devon, England

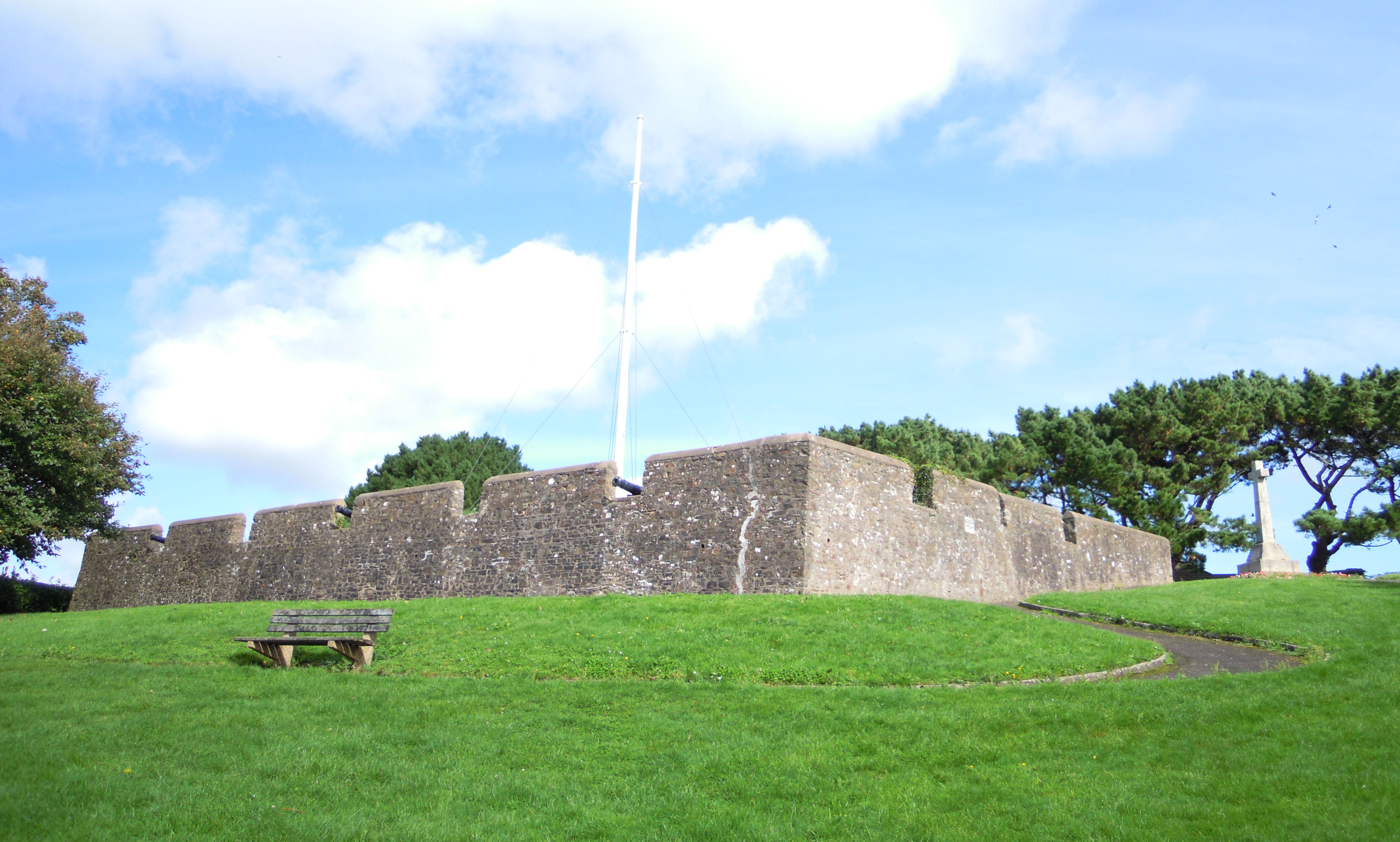

- Location within Devon
- 51°00′58″N 4°11′55″W
- Type: Artillery battery folly
- Location: East-the-Water
- Nearest city: Bideford, Devon

History
- Founded: August 1642
- Founder: Sir George Chudleigh; James Chudleigh
- Built for: Parliamentarian forces
- Original use: English Civil War gun platform

Site notes
- Restored: Mid 19th Century
- Restored by: James Ley
- Owner: Torridge District Council

Listed Building
- Type: Grade II
- Designated: 8 November 1949

Chudleigh Fort is an ornamental fort in East-the-Water, a suburb of Bideford in Devon in the UK. The site was originally an actual 17th-century earthwork gun platform that was built during the English Civil War. In the 19th century, the site was reconstructed to create a stone belvedere. It was given Grade II listed building status in 1949.

== 17th century fortification ==
The original gun platform was built for the important Devon landowner and Parliamentarian supporter Sir George Chudleigh and his son James Chudleigh, who had served as an officer in the Royalist army in Ireland. The pair had sided with the Roundhead garrison in Barnstaple, which also covered nearby Bideford, because of the prejudice they had towards Charles I for exploiting the merchant classes of England. For example, in the lead up to the English Civil War, The Crown had imposed a medieval tax known as ship money on ports, greatly affecting trade through important mercantile ports like Bideford and Barnstaple.

Some time after August 1642 James Chudleigh built a pair of 8-gun earthwork artillery gun platforms on both sides of the River Torridge to guard the seaborne approaches to Bideford against attacks by Royalist ships. They were strategically positioned on the high ground at East-the-Water and West-the-Water.

By the summer of 1643 the Royalists, under Sir Ralph Hopton, had made major gains in the South West, having won victories at the Battle of Braddock Down (January 1643) and Stratton (May 1643), causing the Parliamentary forces to retreat into Bideford where they were then besieged. After more Royalist victories at Lansdown (July 1643) and Roundway Down (July 1643) it became clear that Bideford would not be relieved and in August 1643 it was stormed by Royalist forces of Colonel John Digby’s Regiment of Foot (Digby's brother was Sir Kenelm Digby). Following fierce fighting around the two forts the town fell. James Chudleigh was not in Bideford during the siege having taken part in fighting at Stratton.

At the end of the Civil War the forts were abandoned. The site at West-the-Water was built over as the town grew whereas the one on the hill at East-the-Water remained undeveloped.

== Ornamental attraction ==
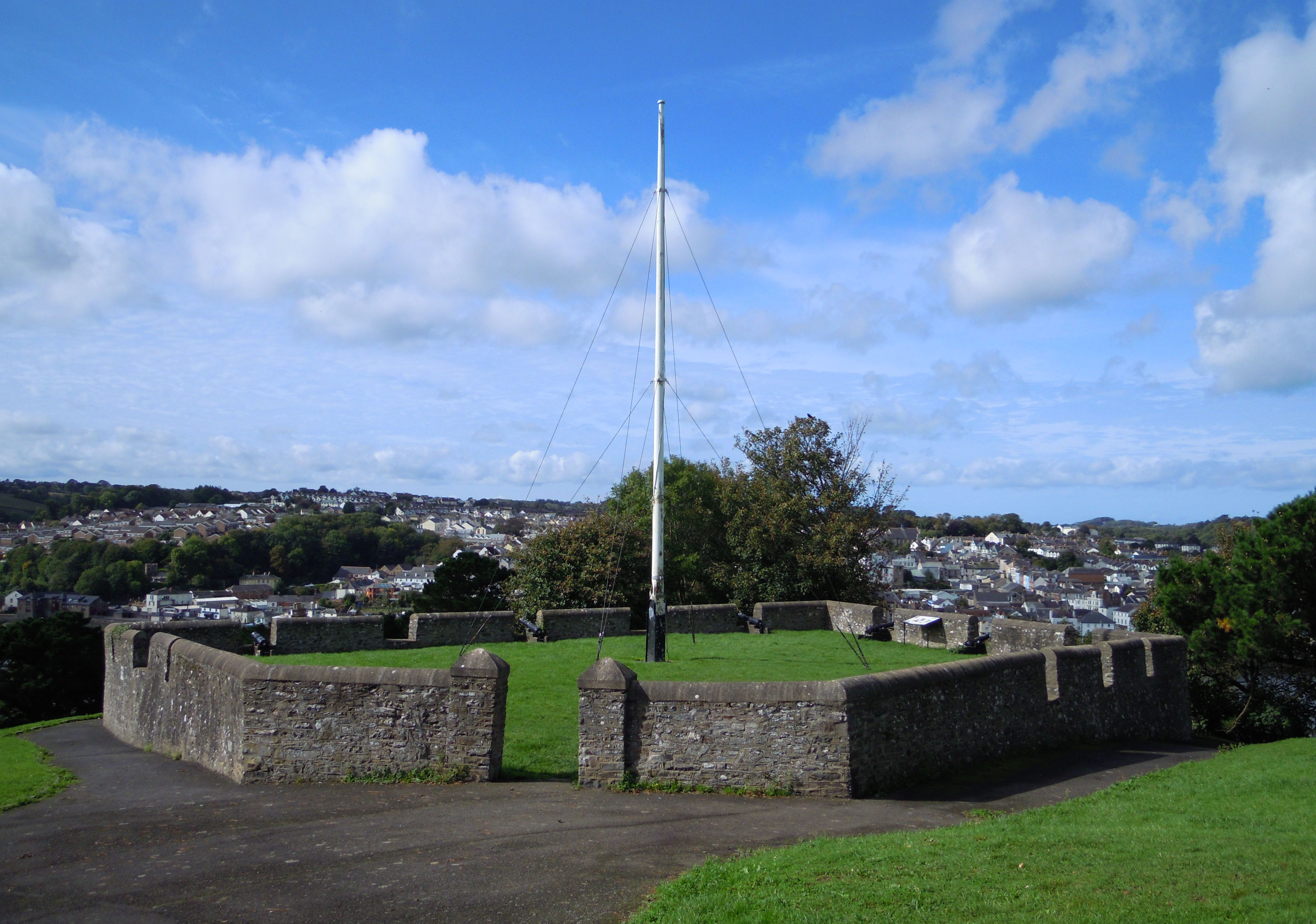
The rear of the 19th-century ornamental Chudleigh Fort.

In the mid-19th century, the East-the-Water of gun platform was rebuilt in stone as a five-sided folly by James Ley from Northam, who gave it 14-gun emplacements instead of the original eight. Seven old cannons on wheeled wooden gun-carriages were also installed at the stone fort. Ley's interpretation of "Chudleigh Fort" was for it to be a belvedere that provided elevated views across the town and the River Torridge; it had no genuine military purpose with thin stone walls and an open rear. The plaque on the wall states "Fort erected by Major-General Chudleigh. April 1642". However, this is an error as the Civil War did not start until August 1642.

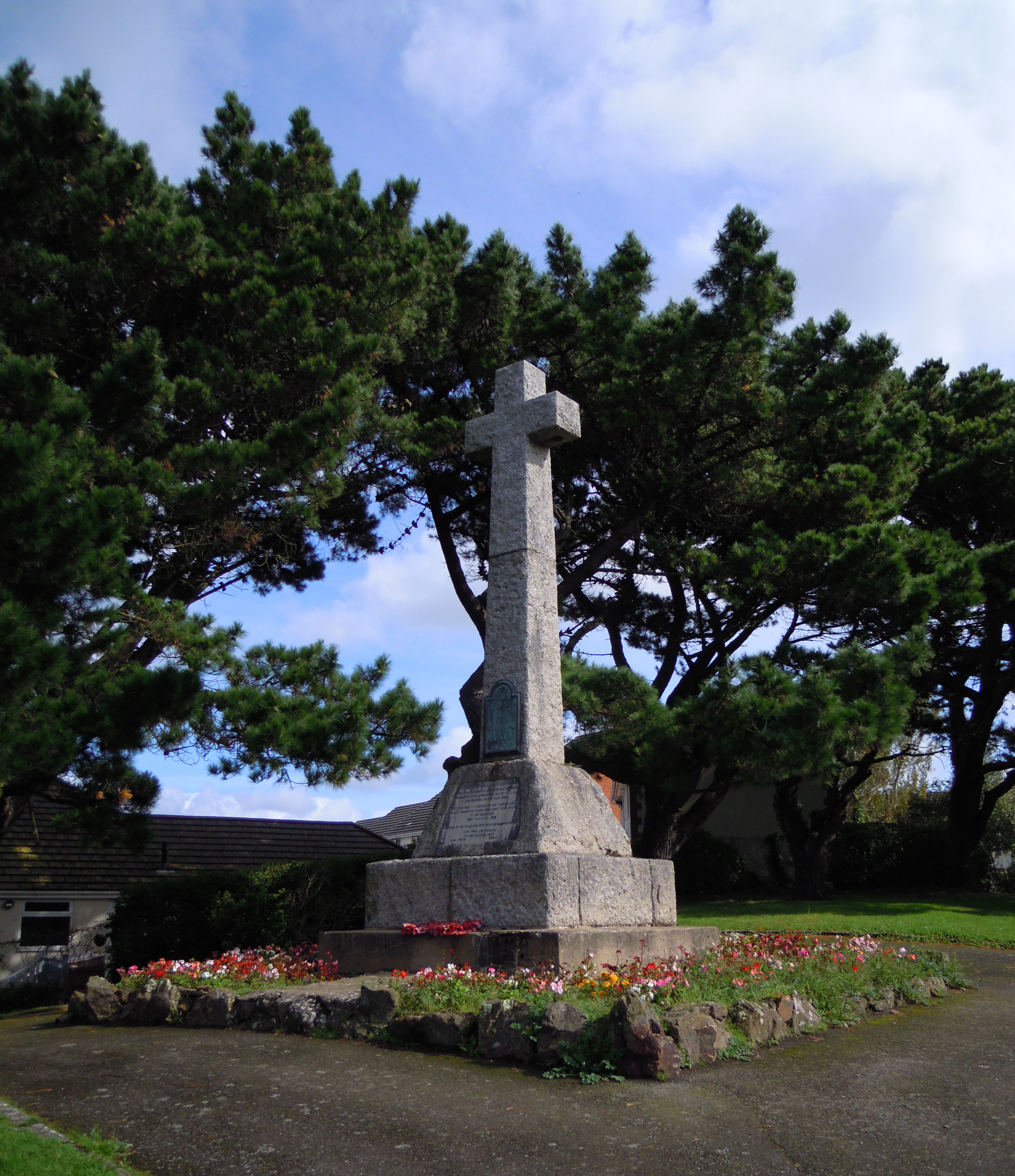
Bideford's War Memorial is near the fort in the park

The site was purchased by public subscription in 1921 for use as a public park in memory of those who died in World War I. At this time the war memorial was built, paths were laid out and the park was landscaped and laid to grass. Later the plaques on the war memorial were altered to commemorate the residents of Bideford who were killed or missing in World War I and World War II. The park is maintained by the Torridge District Council.
