= Thomas Chudleigh =

Thomas Chudleigh may refer to:

- Sir Thomas Chudleigh, 5th Baronet (died 1741), of the Chudleigh baronets
- Thomas Clifford, 1st Baron Clifford of Chudleigh (1630 – 1673), English politician
- Thomas Clifford, 14th Baron Clifford of Chudleigh (born 1948), British baron

== See also ==
- Chudleigh (disambiguation)
