= Chudleigh (disambiguation) =

Chudleigh is a town in Devon, England.

Chudleigh may also refer to:

== Places ==
- Chudleigh Knighton, village in Devon, England
- Chudleigh, Tasmania, village near Mole Creek, Tasmania, Australia
- Mount Chudleigh, mountain in New Zealand

== People ==
- Chudleigh baronets, of Ashton, Devon
- Elizabeth Chudleigh (1720-1788), English noble, known for her bigamy scandal
- James Chudleigh (c.1618–1643), English military officer during the first period of the English Civil War.
- Mary Chudleigh (1656–1710), English writer
- Ted Chudleigh (born 1943), Canadian politician

== See also ==
- Chudley (disambiguation)
