= Francis Bassett =

Arms of Basset: Barry wavy of six or and gules

Sir Francis Bassett (1594 – 1645) of Tehidy in the parish of Illogan in Cornwall, was Sheriff of Cornwall, a Vice-Admiral of North Cornwall, and Recorder of St Ives. His portrait by Vandyck was formerly displayed at Tehidy (now demolished). He appears to have been a sportsman, much addicted to hawking and cock-fighting.

He was the son of Revd. James Bassett of Tehidy and his wife Jane, the daughter of Sir Francis Godolphin.

He served as Vice-Admiral of North Cornwall from 1623 to his death in 1645 and was High Sheriff of Cornwall in 1642–1644. There is a complaint against him in the Star Chamber, 18 May 1625.

During the Civil War in 1643, he acted as a Royalist in the western part of Cornwall, raising money and drilling forces for the king. Letters of his to his wife 'at her Tehidy' are preserved, recording the Royalist victories of Stamford Hill near Stratton, and of Braddock Down near Lostwithiel, at the latter of which (or at any rate very shortly after the fight) he, with most of the Cornish gentry, was present, and was knighted on the field. He records in another letter to his wife that after the battle 'the king, in the hearing of thousands, as soon as he saw me in the morning, cryed to mee "Deare Mr. Sheriffe, I leave Cornwall to you safe and sound"’.

In 1640, he presented to the borough of St Ives a loving-cup bearing the following inscription:

If any discord 'twixt my friends arise
Within the borough of belov'd St. Ives,
It is desirèd this my cup of love
To everie one a peace-maker may prove.
Then am I blest to have given a legacie,
So like my harte, unto posteritie.

== Personal life ==
In 1620, Bassett married Ann Trelawny, a daughter of Sir Jonathan Trelawny (1568-1604) of Trelawny, Cornwall. Their children included John Basset (died 1661), eldest son and heir and Francis Basset, second son, of Taunton, Somerset, a puritan who in 1661 was accused of a conspiracy against King Charles II, of which charge he was honourably acquitted after a letter which he was alleged to have written was proved a forgery.

Bassett died 19 September 1645. The full vengeance of Cromwell fell upon his first son, although he had never taken up arms, who was compelled to compound for his estates, and had to sell St Michael's Mount in 1660 to a member of the St Aubyn family, in whose possession it has remained ever since.

== See also ==
- Baron Basset
- Great Cornish Families
- Tehidy Country Park
