= John Chudleigh (disambiguation) =

John Chudleigh may refer to one of three English politicians:

- John Chudleigh (MP for Devon) (1564–1589), in Devon (UK Parliament constituency)
- John Chudleigh (MP for Lostwithiel) (c. 1584–c. 1634), his son
- John Chudleigh (MP for East Looe) (1606–1634), his grandson
