= Chudley (disambiguation) =

Chudley is an alternative spelling of Chudleigh, Devon, England.

Chudley may also refer to:

- W. Chudley (1838–1919), English printer, stationer, deacon, and activist
- Will Chudley (born 1988), English rugby union player
- Lloyd Chudley Alexander (1924—2007), American author
- Chudley-Mccullough syndrome, a genetic disorder characterized by bilateral hearing loss
- Smith–Fineman–Myers syndrome (also known as Chudley–Lowry syndrome), a congenital disorder that causes birth defects

== See also ==
- Chudleigh (disambiguation)
