= Army Plots =

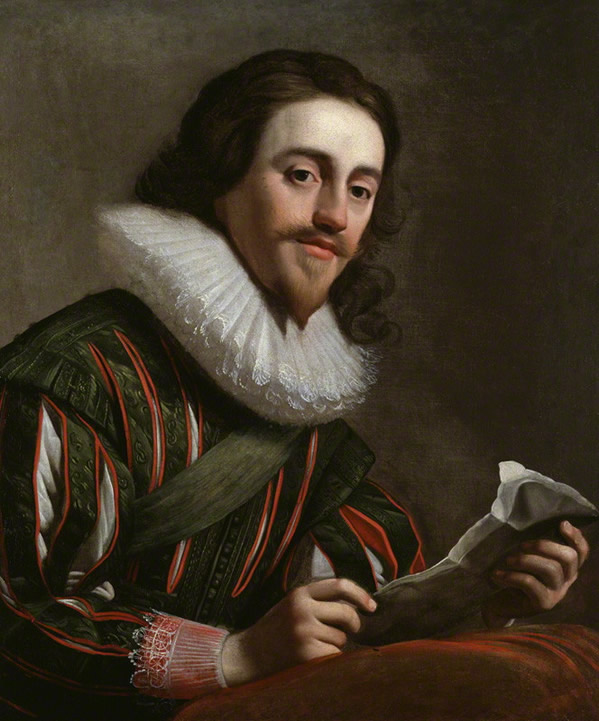
King Charles I

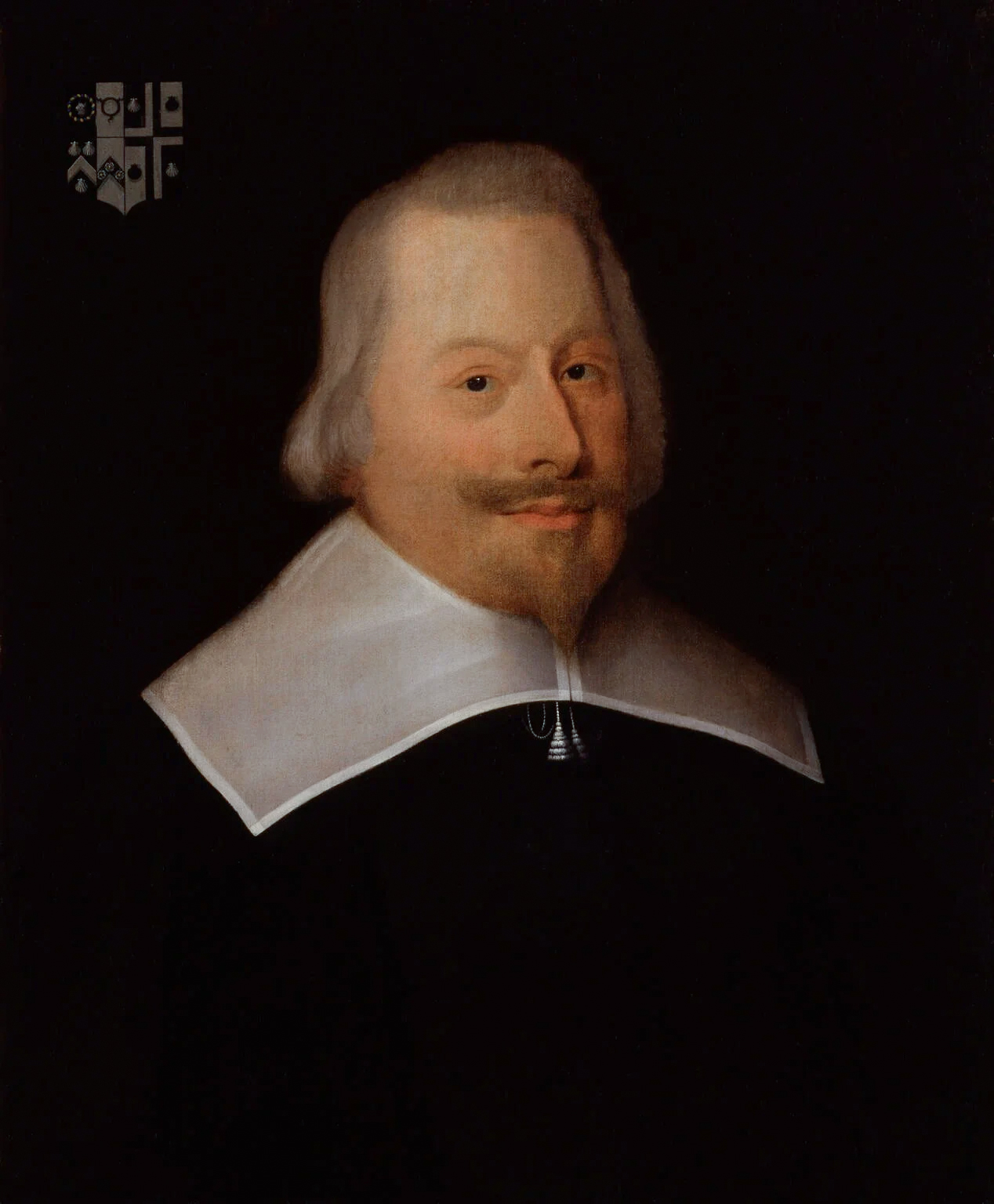
John Pym

The 1641 Army Plots were two separate alleged attempts by supporters of Charles I of England to use the army to crush the Parliamentary opposition in the run-up to the First English Civil War. The plan was to move the army from York to London and to use it to reassert royal authority. It was also claimed that the plotters were seeking French military aid and that they planned to seize and fortify towns to become Royalist strongholds.

The exposure of the plots in May allowed John Pym and other opposition leaders to gain the upper hand by imprisoning or forcing into exile many of the king's supporters, including his wife Henrietta Maria. According to Conrad Russell, it remains unclear "who plotted with whom to do what" and that "Charles I's plots, like his grandmother's lovers, are capable of growing in the telling". Nevertheless, there were clearly real attempts to negotiate the movement of troops to London.

== First Army Plot ==
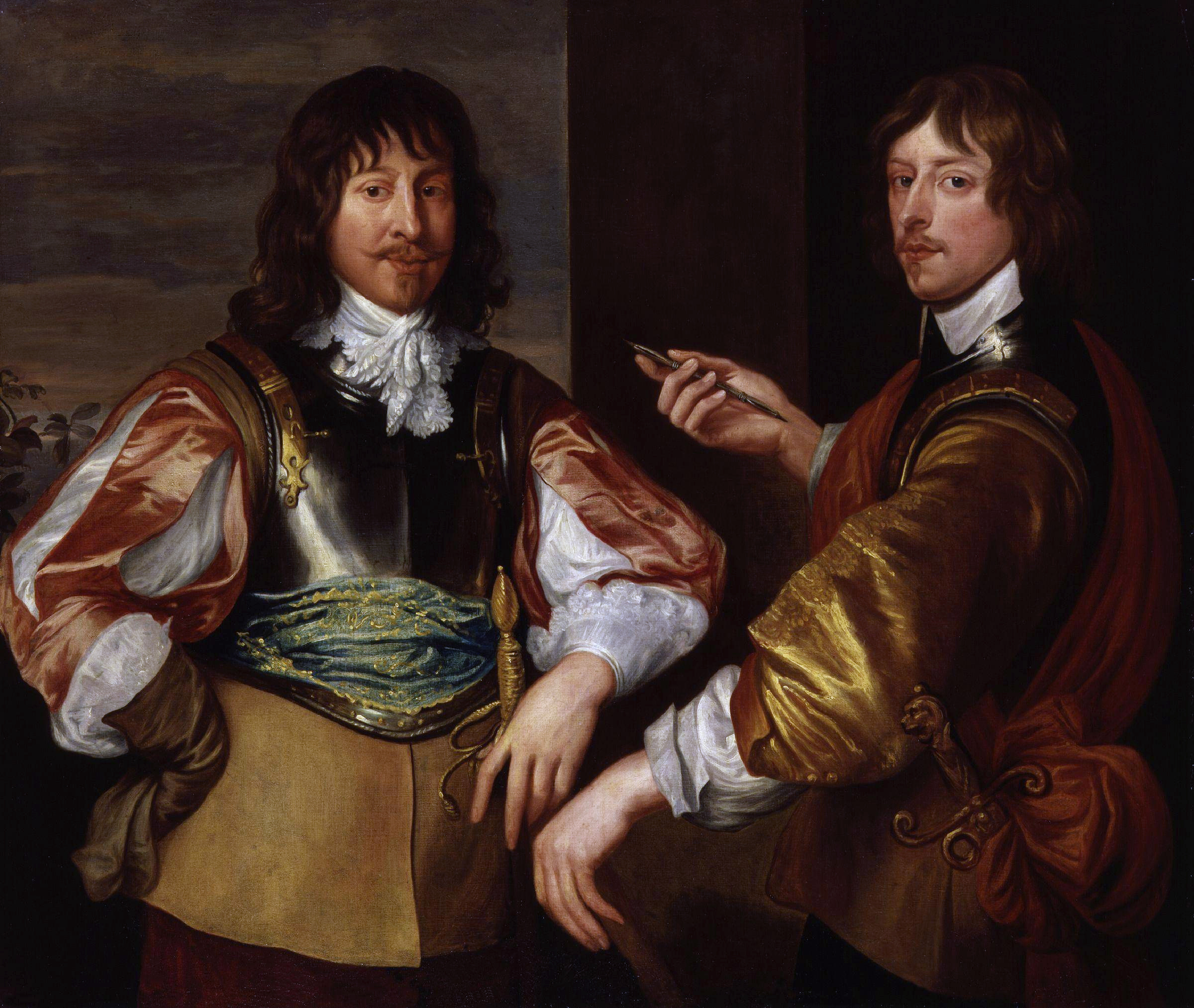
George Goring (right) with Mountjoy Blount (left), to whom he revealed details of the First Army Plot

The so-called "first army plot" unfolded between March and May 1641. Despite defeat in the Bishops' Wars, the recall of Parliament in November 1640 and its prosecution of William Laud and Strafford, as ever Charles sought to regain any ground lost to his opponents. Encouraged by the defection of Covenanters like Montrose, he hoped to break the alliance between the Scots and his opponents in Parliament. This ended in late February after the Scots published demands for the execution of Strafford and removal of bishops from the Church of England. When Parliament refused to condemn the Scots, Charles realised he could not reach agreement with his critics on terms that he considered acceptable.

His conclusion coincided with discontent among the English troops, which came to a head when Parliament diverted money intended for their wages to the Scots. This provoked fury among the officers, who commonly funded expenses in advance and depended upon payment of these for later reimbursement. They composed a letter listing their complaints, which was brought to London by James Chudleigh, a captain in the Earl of Northumberland's regiment. He shared its contents with the poet William Davenant, John Suckling and Henry Jermyn.

George Goring proposed that the army at York march south to threaten Parliament, while he seized Portsmouth in order to provide a landing place for external assistance. A second element was Suckling along with Henry Jermyn, supported the move and hoped to occupy the Tower of London. This was linked to a plan to free Strafford who was being held there. Meanwhile, Henry Percy was also independently planning to petition Parliament for financial support for the army.

At a meeting with the king and queen, Percy and Goring discussed the proposal to bring the main army south. Rumours began to circulate that the king would take command of the army and that French troops would be sent in support. However, the main body of the soldiery refused to accept the proposals and so it was abandoned. Goring told Mountjoy Blount, 1st Earl of Newport, of the plans. Blount passed on the information indirectly to leading Parliamentarian John Pym in April. Davenant and Suckling, however, still planned to seize the Tower. Soldiers loyal to the king were placed in position, but the situation soon became known to Parliament, and a stand-off developed. Soldiers loyal to Parliament quickly took control of the Tower.

In the ensuing investigation, much was made of claims that the king and queen were plotting to obtain French military support. It was claimed that the queen had diverted her personal funds to the port of Portsmouth, of which Goring was in command, in order to turn it into a Royalist fortress. Evidence was also produced that the king was gathering funds to win military men over to his side.

As soon as the plot was discovered Percy sought to flee to France, but was assaulted and wounded by country people in Sussex. He was forced to go into hiding. He wrote a letter to his brother, giving an account of events, which the Parliamentarians later used as proof of the reality of the plot. After his capture, he tried to blame others. Royalists condemned him for betraying the King. Goring too distanced himself from the plans of Davenant and Suckling. His submission to Parliament allowed him to retain control of Portsmouth. Davenant, Jermyn and Suckling all fled to France, where Suckling died shortly afterwards, probably by suicide. The failure of the plot contributed to the condemnation and execution of Strafford as a traitor, and alienated many moderate Royalists from the king.

== Second Army Plot ==
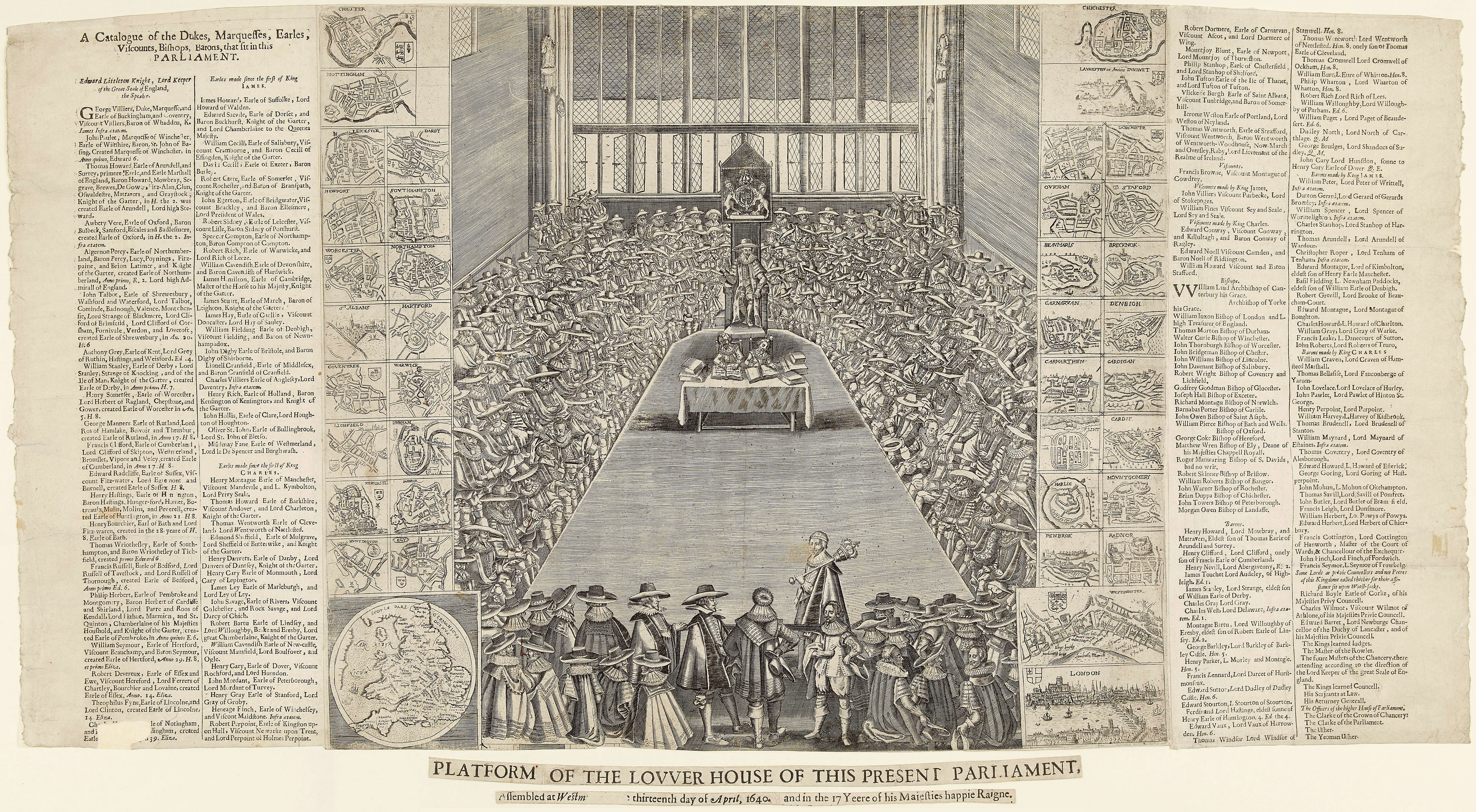
The Long Parliament in session, 1640

A few months later, rumours of a second plot began circulating. In May, Charles sent Daniel O'Neill to negotiate with army leaders, suggesting that they might move their forces south to "protect" both the king and moderate parliamentarians. O'Neill also sought to ensure the Scots Covenanter government remained neutral; like Ireland, Scotland was then separate from England, although Charles was king in all three. Pym sought to rally support to put local militias on alert against the proposed move, which again failed to find sufficient support among army commanders.

William Legge, who had been questioned after the first plot, was directly involved with the second. Along with two other M.P.s, Henry Wilmot, 1st Earl of Rochester was expelled from the Long Parliament in December 1641 for alleged complicity in the Second Army Plot and was placed under arrest. O'Neill escaped to France, but soon returned and was arrested and imprisoned. This time Percy was also expelled from the House of Commons in December, after which he too left for France.

== Consequences ==
The two army plots had the effect of hardening the differences between the two sides, and ultimately of strengthening the Parliamentary cause by allowing Parliament to gauge the extent of support for the king among army commanders. Pym was also able to establish the conditions for militias and pro-Parliamentary factions to defend towns potentially threatened by the Royalists. Leading Royalists were either forced into exile or deprived of power, further strengthening Parliament's hand.

The events made it increasingly clear that the king would not be able to impose his will with a threat of force. His attempt to arrest his leading opponents in Parliament without army backing in January 1642, was an abject failure. He fled from London to his strongholds in the Midlands a few days later. The queen left the country. When Charles made clear his intention to fight, Goring, still in control of Portsmouth, immediately declared in favour of the king. Jermyn and Davenant both returned to England to join the king. O'Neill escaped from prison in 1642 dressed as a woman, and also joined the Royalists. Percy and Wilmot joined the Royalists, but eventually fell out of Charles' favour for advocating negotiations with Parliament.
