= The Gear Rout =

1648 rebellion in Cornwall

Coordinates: 50.091°N 5.090°W

The Gear Rout was a rebellion in Cornwall against the Parliamentarians following the end of the English Civil War. It involved approximately 500 Cornish rebels who had fought during the conflict on the Royalist side against Parliamentarian forces of Sir Hardress Waller. After the English Civil War, the Parliamentarians increased to fund military installations but many in Cornwall rebelled against this and took to arms.

Following the Parliamentarian killing of 70 Cornish Royalists in Penzance on 16 May 1648, the inhabitants of Mullion sent 120 rebels, who marched to Goonhilly Downs and then to St Keverne and Mawgan, collecting 300 more infantrymen and 40 cavalrymen. There was a battle against Parliamentarian forces under the control of Waller which ultimately led to the defeat of the rebels near Gear Camp, a nearby earthwork of the Celtic Iron Age that overlooked the Helford River.

== See also ==
- William Scawen
- Braddock, Cornwall
- Cornwall in the English Civil War
