= James Chudleigh =

English Civil War military officer (1618–1643)

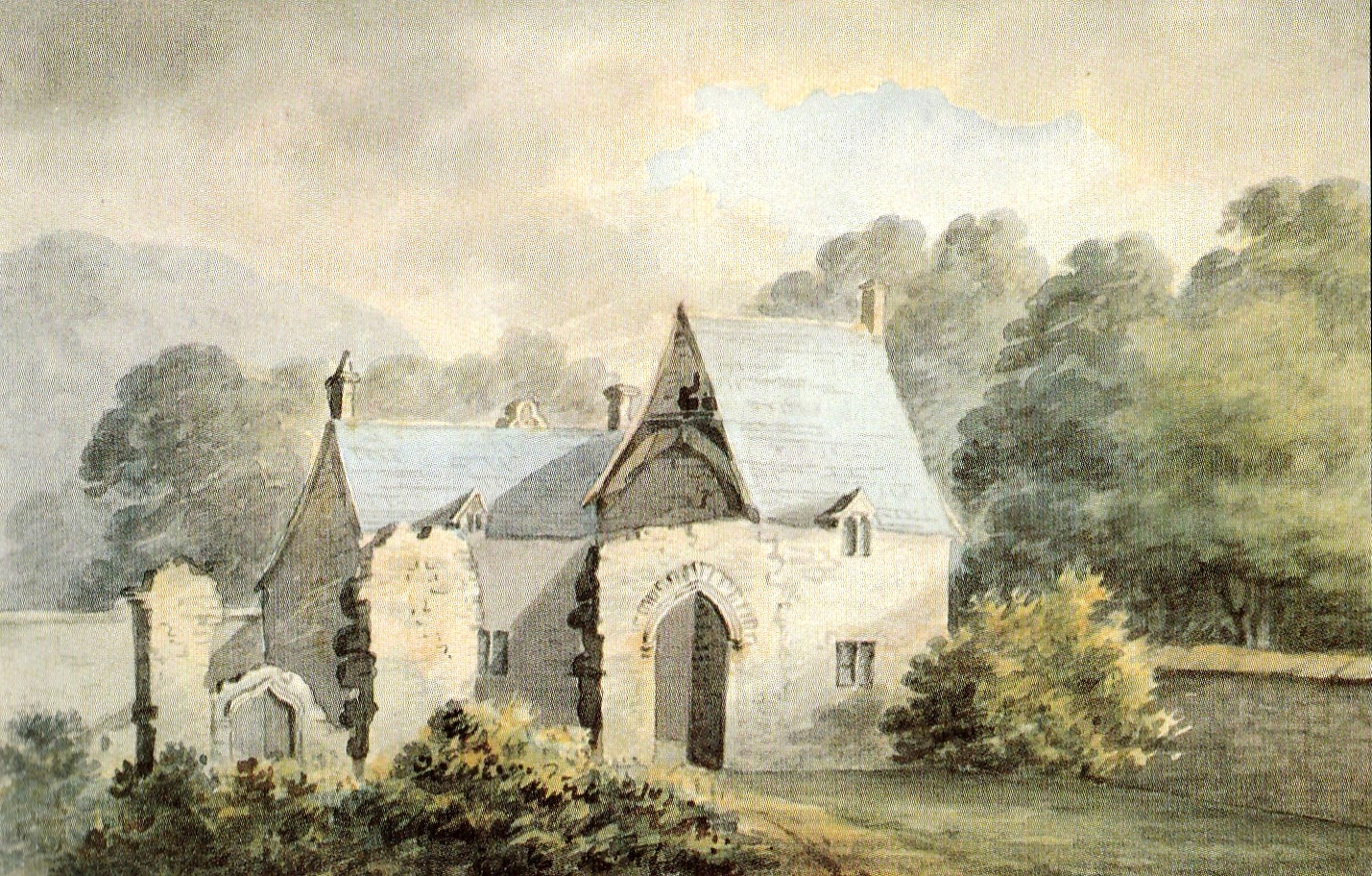
- Chudleigh's birthplace, Ashton Manor, c. 1794

Personal details
- Born: 1618 Ashton Manor, Devon
- Died: 6 October 1643 (aged 25) Dartmouth, Devon, England
- Cause of death: Gunshot wound
- Resting place: St Saviours, Dartmouth
- Relations: William Strode
- Parent(s): Sir George Chudleigh; Mary Strode (1586–1645)
- Occupation: Soldier

Military service
- Allegiance: (Kingdom of England) Parliament to May 1643; Royalists
- Years of service: 1641 to 1643
- Rank: Sergeant major general (Parliament); Colonel (Royalist)
- Battles/wars: Bishops' Wars; First English Civil War; Braddock Down; Sourton Down; Stratton

Colonel James Chudleigh (c. 1618 – 6 December 1643) was an English military officer, who served in the First English Civil War. Initially appointed to command the Parliamentarian garrison at Barnstaple, he showed considerable ability, and was quickly promoted.

Wounded and captured after the Royalist victory at the Battle of Stratton in May 1643, he changed sides, possibly as a result of being accused of responsibility for the defeat. His father, Sir George Chudleigh, was also a Parliamentarian commander and switched sides at the same time.

On 30 September 1643, Chudleigh was wounded in a Royalist attack on Dartmouth, where he died on 6 October.

== Personal details ==
James Chudleigh was the fourth of nine sons of Sir George Chudleigh and his wife Mary Strode (1586–1645). The family were members of the Devon gentry; his father was a Member of Parliament, and purchased a baronetcy in 1622. (Note: Both James and Charles I sold these to raise money.) James was born in 1618 at Ashton Manor, a family possession from 1320 until 1735.

It is possible his brothers avoided direct participation in the Civil War; although later claimed George and Christopher 'fought for Parliament', there is no record of this. Thomas served in Ireland until October 1643, when his regiment returned to England to reinforce the Western Royalist army. He does not appear on its muster rolls after April 1643, and is next recorded as a surgeon in Exeter in 1648.

As with many others, Chudleigh's family ties show the complexity of relationships in the period. His maternal uncle, William Strode (1594–1645), was imprisoned from 1629 to 1640 for his opposition to Personal Rule and one of the Five Members whose attempted arrest in January 1642 was a key stage on the road to war. His cousin, Sir Alexander Carew, was executed by Parliament in 1644 for plotting to betray Plymouth to the Royalists. John Carew, another cousin, signed Charles' death warrant in 1649 and was subjected to hanging, drawing, and quartering in October 1660 as a regicide.

== Career ==
Details of Chudleigh's early life are limited prior to 1640, when he was Captain in the Earl of Northumberland's regiment, part of the army raised for the Bishops' Wars. He became involved in the 1641 Army Plots, an alleged conspiracy to seize London, release the Earl of Strafford, and dissolve Parliament. Along with Lord Goring, governor of Portsmouth, and Northumberland's younger brother Henry, he was investigated by Parliament, but appears to have served as a courier, and was released without charge.

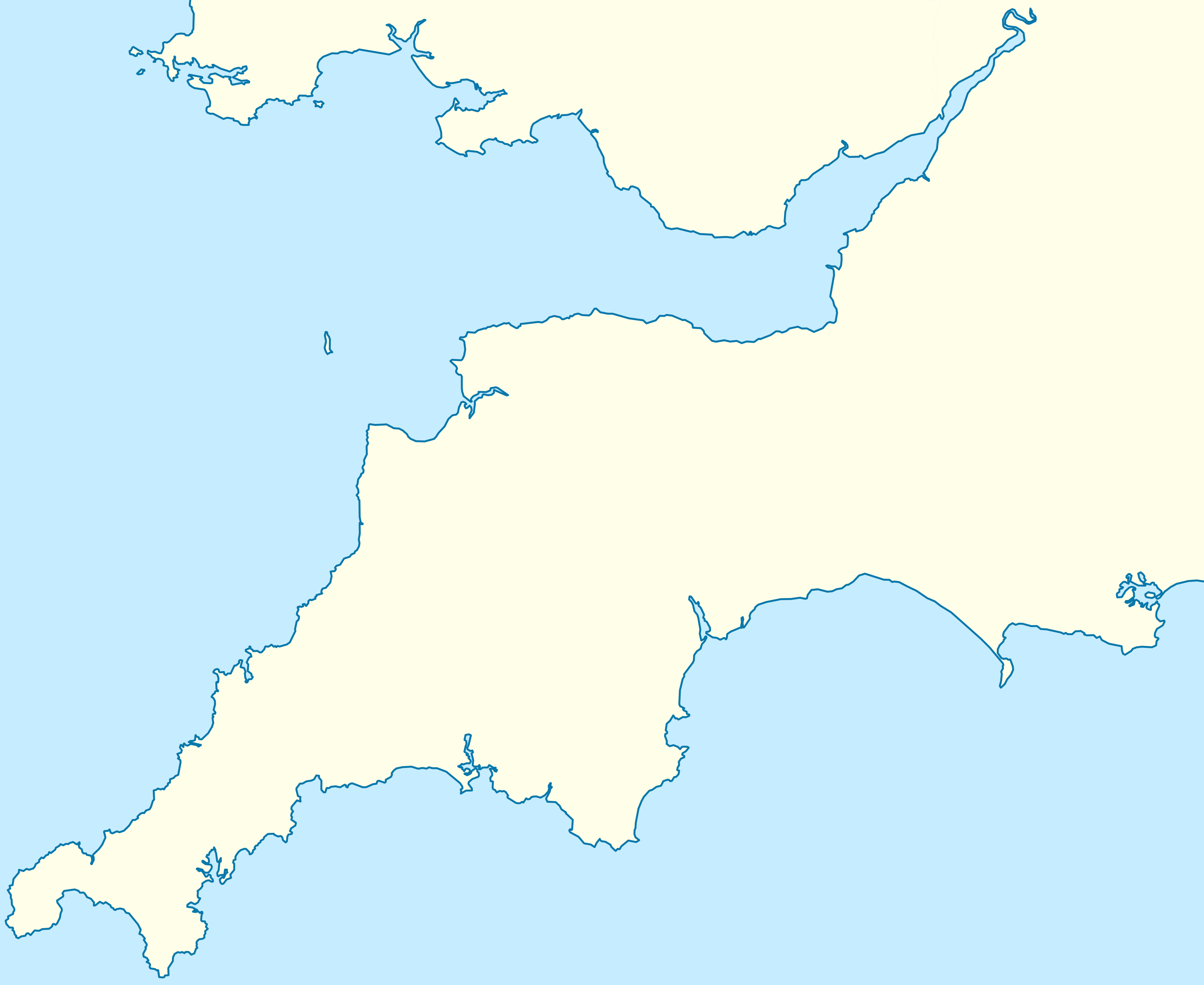
War in the West, 1642 to 1643

When the First English Civil War began in August 1642, Chudleigh apparently tried to join the Royalists, but was rejected on the grounds his father and uncle were 'notoriously disaffected to the King'. Instead, Parliament authorised him to raise "1,000 dragoons...in Somerset, Devon, and Cornwall", which he used to garrison Barnstaple in north Devon. During this period, he supervised construction of Chudleigh Fort, near Bideford.

The Earl of Stamford, Parliamentary commander in the West Country, appointed Chudleigh his deputy, although he later claimed he had been ordered to do so. Chudleigh was one of the few who performed well in their defeat at Braddock Down in January 1643. On 21 February, he led an attack that captured Modbury, a village held by the Royalists for the siege of Plymouth.

On 28 February, the two sides agreed a local truce, which ended on 22 April. In anticipation, Chudleigh assembled 1,700 troops at Lifton, near Launceston, where Hopton had concentrated over 3,600 men. He attacked the next day, but the Royalists quickly recovered; faced by superior numbers, the Parliamentary force withdrew to Okehampton; supported by John Merrick's "Greycoats", Chudleigh covered the retreat, reportedly taking personal control of saving the artillery.

On 25 April, the Royalist leader Sir Ralph Hopton marched on Sourton Down, intending to stop there for the night, and attack Okehampton at dawn. At 9:00 pm, Chudleigh learned the enemy was only two miles (3 km) away, and also discovered his artillery transport had been taken to Crediton. Since retreat meant abandoning his guns, he ambushed the Royalists with only 100 cavalry; at night, and in the middle of a violent thunderstorm, they panicked and broke.

Although not present at Sourton Down, Stamford was given credit for the victory, a rare piece of good news for Parliament in the west. (Note: Published as 'A true relation of the wonderful victory obtained by Parliamentary forces under the Earl of Stamford.') Using intelligence captured there, he marched into Cornwall with 5,400 men, first sending his cavalry under Sir George Chudleigh on a diversionary raid against Bodmin.

Despite being outnumbered, Hopton won a decisive victory at Stratton on 16 May, which ensured Royalist control of Devon. Defeat was a combination of factors, including the outstanding courage of the Cornish infantry, and absence of the Parliamentary cavalry. The last was an unwise counter-attack by Chudleigh; initially successful, it exposed the Parliamentary centre to a flanking attack. Efforts to stop the collapse failed; the Parliamentarians lost 300 casualties, and 1,700 prisoners, including Chudleigh.

Taken to the Royalist capital in Oxford, Chudleigh switched sides; his reasons were set out in a Royalist propaganda pamphlet, published under his name. (Note: Serjeant Major (sic) James Chudleigh, his declaration to his country-men; common on both sides, such publications were normally written by someone else.) This reflected his importance to the Parliamentary cause in Devon; shortly before Stratton, he published a similar attack on the Royalists. In his 'History of the Rebellion', the Earl of Clarendon, then a senior Royalist advisor, claimed he fought bravely until captured, and changed sides as a matter of conscience.

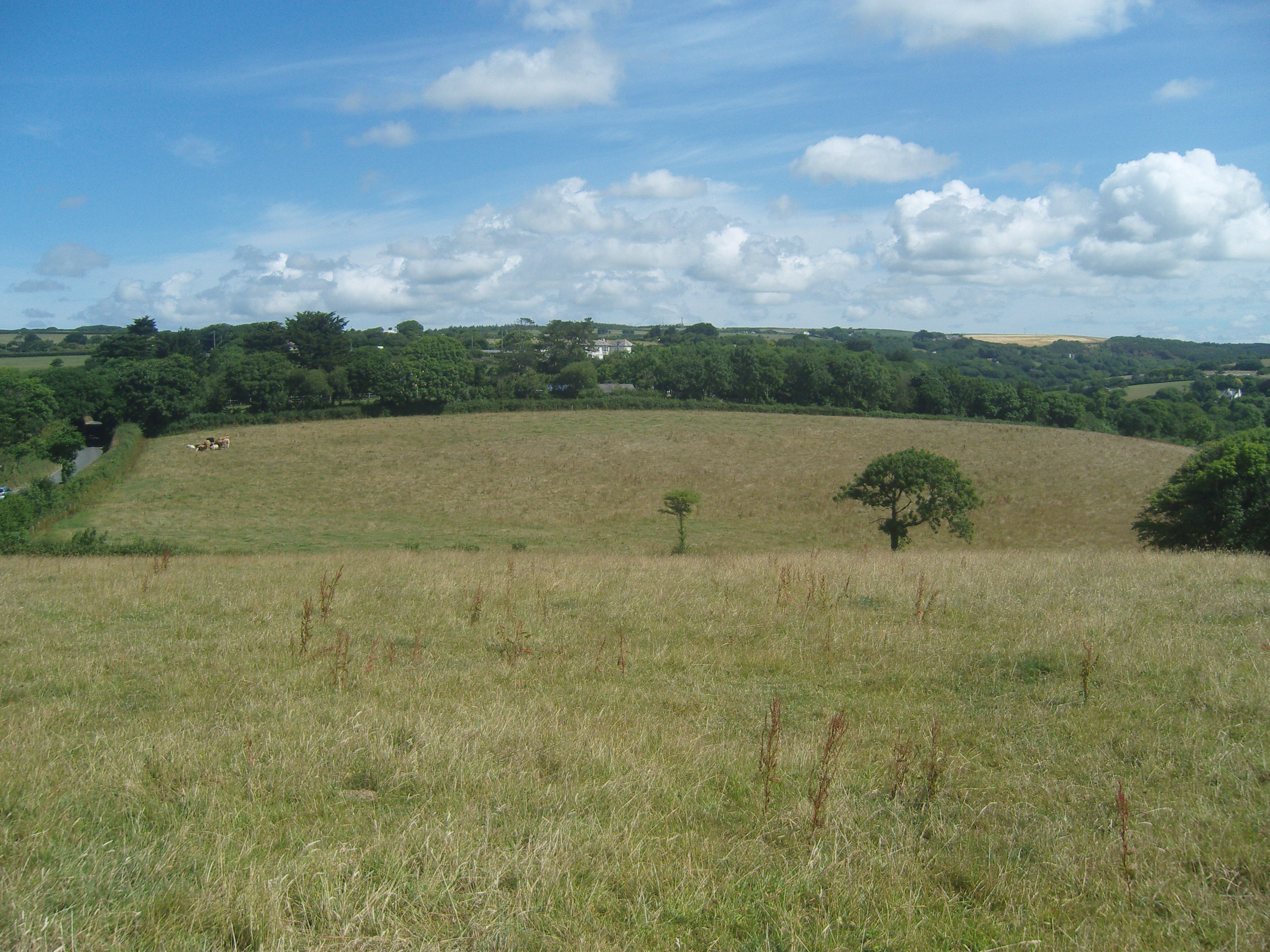
The battlefield at Stratton

Stamford escaped to Exeter, where Sir George was governor; the city surrendered in early September to Prince Maurice, whose army now included Colonel James Chudleigh. The garrison was given a pass to the nearest friendly territory, and Stamford returned to London. On arrival, he claimed his defeat was due to Chudleigh deserting during the battle, which varies from other reports he was captured only after being wounded. Stamford never held command again, suggesting he was held responsible.

Sir George resigned his commission, arguing that while he supported the protection of law and religion, "the destruction of a kingdom cannot be the way to save it". As Cornwall was occupied by the Royalists until the war ended in 1646, he 'garrisoned' Ashton Manor, but avoided active participation; in 1647, he was fined for being a Royalist, although it is possible he escaped payment.

In September 1643, James Chudleigh took part in a Royalist assault on Dartmouth; according to Clarendon, he was wounded on or around 30 September, and died a few days later. On 6 October, he was buried in St Saviours church, Dartmouth.

== Sources ==
- Barratt, John (2005). The Civil War in the South-West. Barnsley: Pen & Sword Military. ISBN 1-84415-146-8.
- Barratt, John (2004). Cavalier Generals: King Charles I and His Commanders in the English Civil War 1642–46. Barnsley: Pen & Sword Military. ISBN 978-1-84415-128-8.
- Carlton, C (1992). Going to the Wars: The Experience of the British Civil Wars 1638-1651. Routledge. ISBN 978-0415032827.
- Collins, A (1741). The English Baronetage. Thomas Wonton.
- Fuller-Eliott-Drake, Elizabeth, Lady (1911). The family and heirs of Sir Francis Drake. Smith Elder.
- Henning, Basil Duke (2010). CHUDLEIGH, Thomas (b.c.1649), of Golden Square, Westminster in The History of Parliament: the House of Commons 1660-1690 (Online ed.). Boydell & Brewer.
- Hoare, Richard Colt, Sir (1840). Catalogue of the Hoare Library at Stourhead, Co. Wilts. John Bowyer Nicholl.
- Hopper, Andrew (2008). "Grey, Henry, first earl of Stamford". Oxford Dictionary of National Biography (online ed.). Oxford University Press. doi:10.1093/ref:odnb/1093. (Subscription, Wikipedia Library access or UK public library membership required.)
- Hopper, Andrew (2012). Turncoats and Renegadoes: Changing Sides during the English Civil Wars. OUP. ISBN 978-0199575855.
- Mangianello, S (1993). The Concise Encyclopedia of the Revolutions and Wars of England, Scotland, and Ireland, 1639–1660. Scarecrow Press. ISBN 978-0810851009.
- Newman, PR (1993). The Old Service: Royalist Regimental Colonels and the Civil War. Manchester University Press. ISBN 978-0719037528.
- Peachey, Stuart; Turton, Alan (1994). War in the West: Part 4, The Military Units Volume 4. Stuart Press. ISBN 9781858040363.
- Pole, William, Sir (1791). Collections Towards a Description of the County of Devon. Leigh & Sotheby.
- Russell, Conrad (1988). "The First Army Plot of 1641". Transactions of the Royal Historical Society. 88: 85–106. doi:10.1017/S0080440100013177. JSTOR 3678968.
- Smith, G (2010). Royalist Agents, Conspirators and Spies: Their Role in the British Civil Wars, 1640–1660. Ashgate Press. ISBN 978-0754666936.
- Watkins, A (1792). An essay towards a history of Bideford, in the county of Devon. Grigg.
- Wedgwood, CV (1955). The King's Peace, 1637-1641 (1983 ed.). Penguin Classics. ISBN 978-0140069907.
- Wolffe, Mary (2004). "Chudleigh, James". Oxford Dictionary of National Biography (online ed.). Oxford University Press. doi:10.1093/ref:odnb/5382. (Subscription, Wikipedia Library access or UK public library membership required.)
