= Cornwall in the English Civil War =

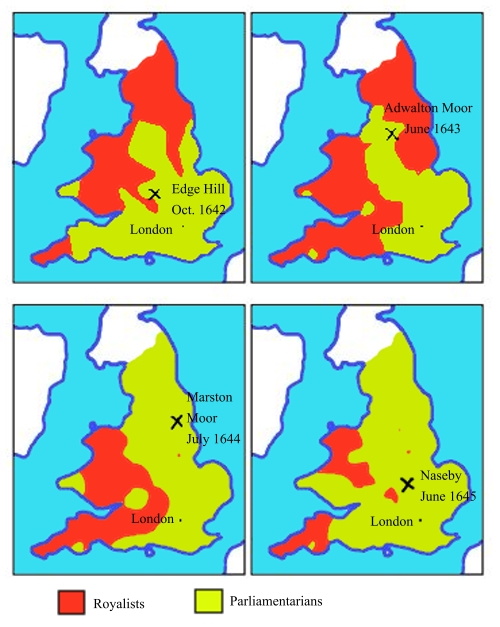
Maps of territory held by Royalists (red) and Parliamentarians (green), 1642 — 1645

Cornwall played a significant role in the English Civil War, being a Royalist enclave in the generally Parliamentarian south-west.

== Civil War military actions in Cornwall and the South West ==
The English Civil War lasted nearly nine years, having begun with the battle of Edgehill, in Warwickshire, on Sunday, 23 October 1642, and ended with the battle of Worcester, on 3 September 1651. The principal events in Cornwall happened in the following order.

=== 1642 ===
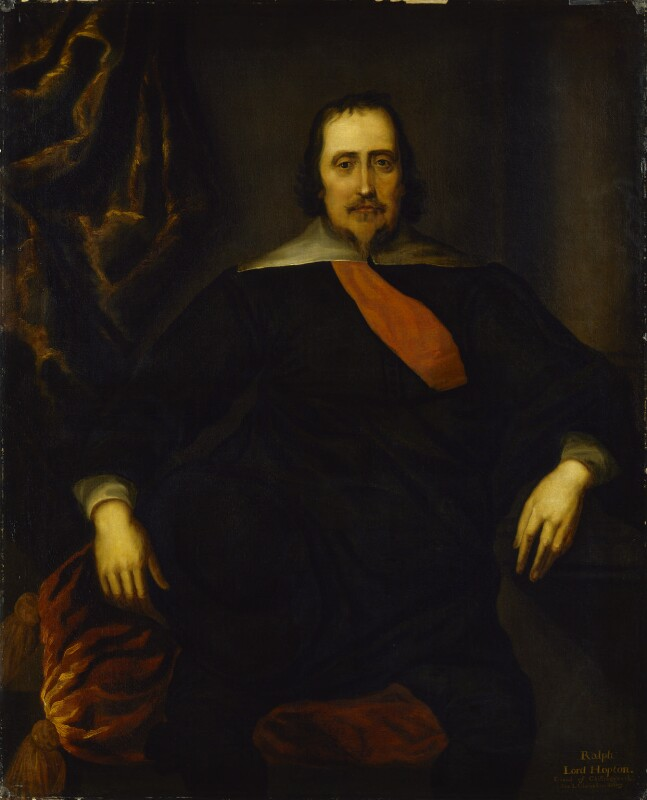
Ralph Hopton, Lord Hopton

In October 1642, Cornwall was secured for the king when some 10,000 men rose under the command of the local Royalist gentry and drove out the small force of Cornish Parliamentarians who had gathered at Launceston. The Cornish-Royalist Army was formed by Sir Ralph Hopton in 1642 and although their first invasion of Devon in November – December 1642 ended in failure the army secured the Cornish side of Plymouth Sound which marked a serious reverse for Parliamentarian forces.

=== 1643 ===
==== The Battle of Braddock Down ====
The Battle of Braddock Down near Boconnoc on 19 January 1643 resulted from a parliamentarian counter-invasion of Cornwall. It ended in defeat for Col. Ruthin's Parliamentarian troops by Sir Ralph Hopton. Hopton's victory secured Cornwall for the King and the Royalists resumed the siege of Plymouth with their forces occupying surrounding towns to seal off the city by land.

==== The Battle of Stratton ====
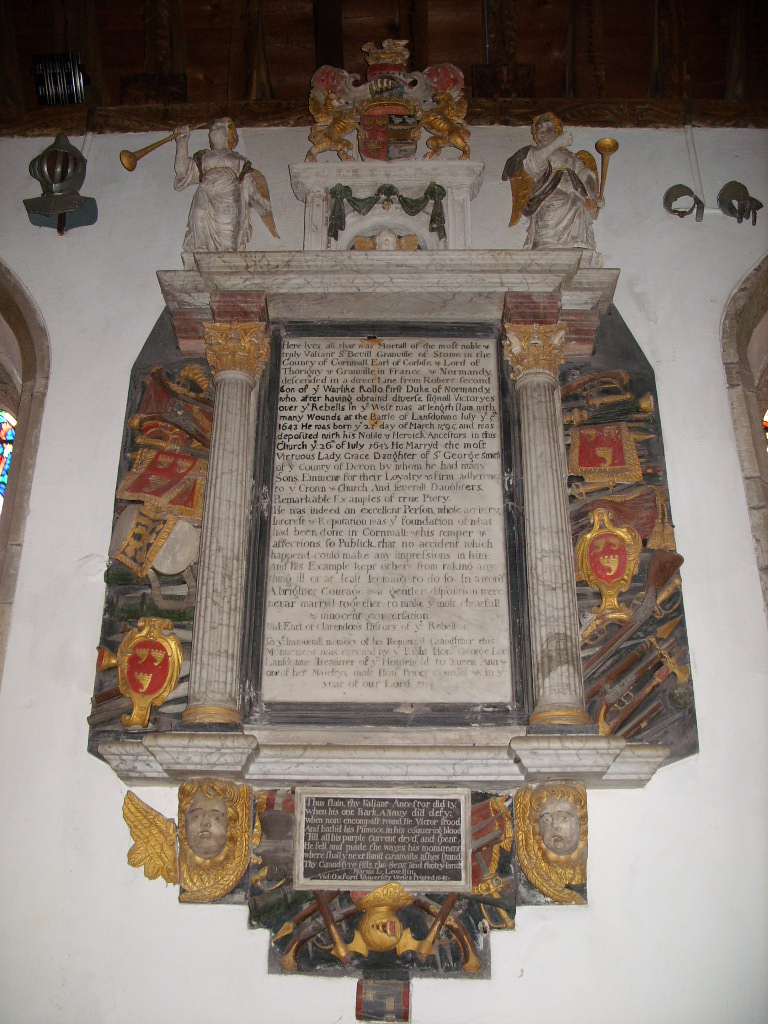
Sir Bevil Grenville's Memorial, at Kilkhampton Church

The Battle of Stratton occurred on 15 May 1643. The Earl of Stamford's Parliamentarian force was repelled by Hopton's men after day-long fighting, with 300 men killed and 1700 captured, and retreated to Bideford. The victories for Hopton with five 'Old Cornish' regiments provided the impetus for campaigns in Devon and Somerset. Taunton and Bridgwater were taken by the Cornish army, but Sir Bevil Grenville was killed in the moment of victory at the Battle of Lansdown in Somerset and Hopton was seriously wounded. Bristol fell to Hopton's Royalist troops, followed by Exeter.

On 13 December the Royalists began a heavy bombardment of the northern defences of Plymouth but with little effect. Sir Richard Grenville, 1st Baronet, having previously declared for Parliament, invited his troops to follow him into the King's service and parliament proclaimed him a traitor.

=== 1644 ===
==== Siege of Plymouth ====
Sir Richard Grenville arrived in Plymouth in March 1644 to maintain a blockade, but it resulted in a stalemate as the inhabitants obtained enough provisions to survive. Robert Devereux, 3rd Earl of Essex, arrived in command of the Roundhead army of 8000 men and forced Grenville to retreat to Cornwall across the River Tamar.

==== The Battle of Lostwithiel ====
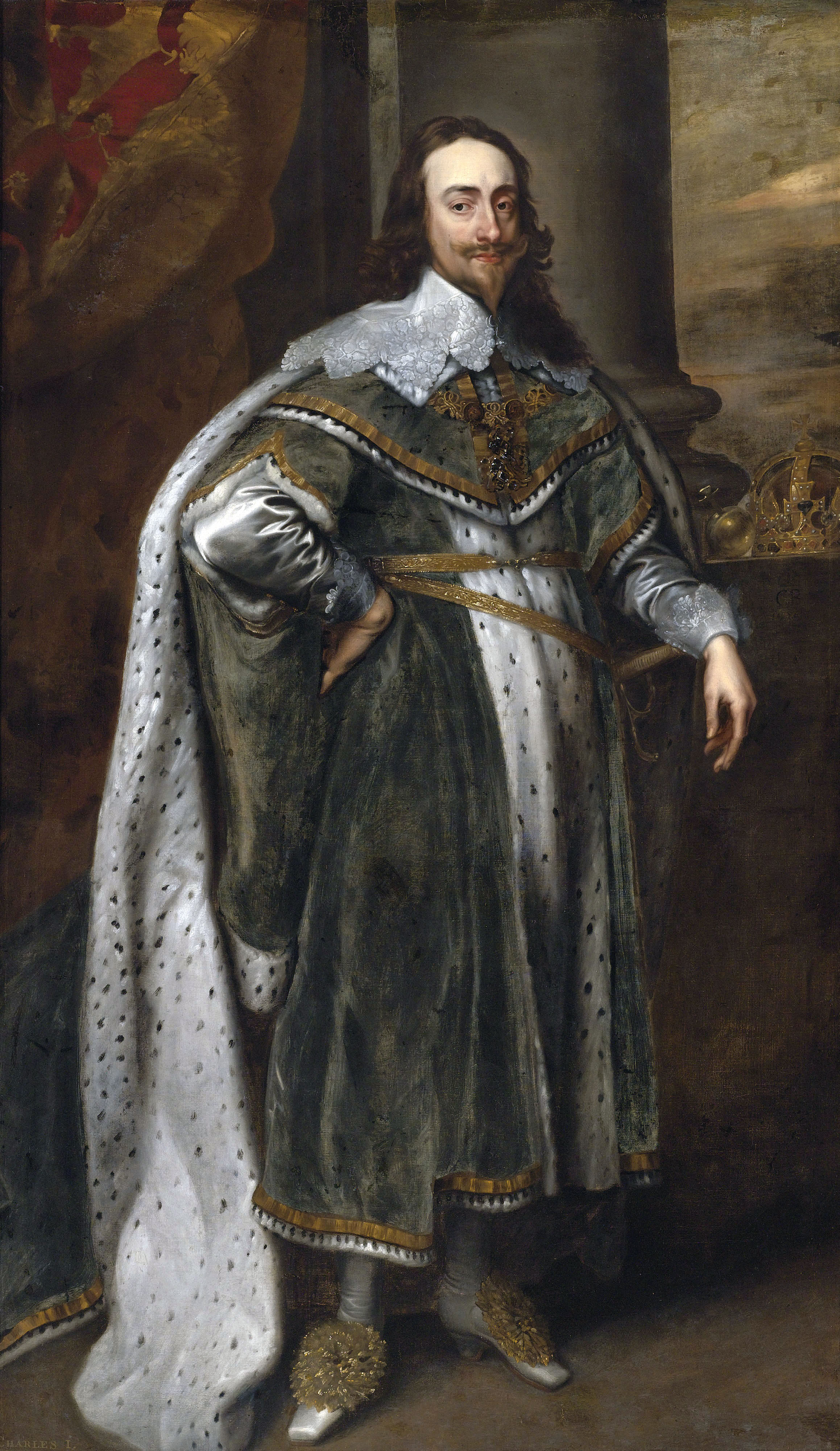
King Charles I

In June 1644 the Earl of Essex took an army of 9,500 to the South-West and successively ended Royalist sieges at Lyme and Plymouth without firing a shot. With such successes, Essex advanced into Cornwall on 26 July believing that with local support he would be able to take control away from the Royalists. On that very same day, however, King Charles, arrived in Exeter intent upon hunting down and destroying Essex's force. Slowly and deliberately King Charles continued west growing his army to a strength of 19,000 by linking up with the Royalist armies of Prince Maurice and Richard Grenville. Given the size of the King's army, Essex found himself trapped on the peninsula with the only means of escape by sea.

Essex quickly moved his army to the small town of Lostwithiel, approximately nine kilometers north of the port at Fowey. By 13 August King Charles and his army reached Lostwithiel and eight days later the Royalists attacked easily taking the high ground to the north and east of Lostwithiel away from Essex's forces. In an untenable position, Essex moved to escape on 31 August first ordering his cavalry to cross the River Fowey and flee to Plymouth which they did successfully. Essex then attempted to retreat to Fowey with his infantry. King Charles had been forewarned of Essex's plan, however, and immediately pursued the Parliamentarians. The resulting battle began at 07:00 hours and continued for eleven hours as Essex tried to disengage and move south while King Charles continued his pursuit.

At 18:00 hours the Royalists had flanked the Parliamentarians and surrounded them at Castle Dore approximately four kilometers north of Fowey. At this point the Royalist stopped the attack for the day while the Parliamentarians hunkered down beaten and exhausted. Without a chance of reaching Fowey with his infantry, Essex and his command staff stole away during the night to the seashore where they used a fishing boat to escape to Plymouth. On 2 September, Philip Skippon, commander of the Parliamentarian infantry surrendered. The Royalists took 6,000 Parliamentarians as prisoners allowing them to return to Southampton after being disarmed.

The Battle of Lostwithiel was a great victory for King Charles and the greatest loss that the Parliamentarians would suffer in the First English Civil War. For King Charles the victory secured the South-West for the remainder of the war and mitigated criticism for a while against the Royalist war effort. For the Parliamentarians, the defeat resulted in recriminations with Sir John Middleton ultimately being blamed for his failure to break-through with reinforcements. The Parliamentarian failure at Lostwithiel along with the failure to defeat King Charles at the Second Battle of Newbury ultimately led Parliament to adopt the Self-denying Ordinance and led to the implementation of the New Model Army.

=== 1645 ===
In 1645 Sir Thomas Fairfax was appointed the commander of the New Model Army. The Royalist army was also reorganised with Prince Charles becoming the Commander-in-Chief. The Royalists suffered a notable loss at the Battle of Naseby in Northamptonshire and there were further Parliamentarian gains in the south and west of England. Prince Charles, the war being mainly in the eastern counties, spent a great part of the autumn and winter in Cornwall, principally at Launceston and Truro. Sir Richard Grenville was committed by the Prince to Launceston Prison, for refusing to obey Lord Hopton: he had already quarrelled with General George Goring.

=== 1646 ===
In 1646 the Prince gave Lord Hopton command of the Royalist forces, with William Wentworth, 2nd Earl of Strafford to command the horse and Grenville the foot. Grenville refused and was imprisoned on St Michael's Mount. Hopton advanced from Stratton towards Exeter, reaching Torrington but was confronted by Fairfax's men, and fell back to Stratton. The Roundheads proceeded into Cornwall reaching Launceston on 25 February 1646 and Bodmin on 2 March. Hopton's army was in disarray but he refused to surrender. News at Bodmin of an imminent Irish invasion further damaged the Royalist cause locally and Fairfax offered Hopton terms. The surrender took place at Tresillian Bridge, near Truro, on 15 March 1646.

=== 1648 ===
==== The Gear Rout ====
The Gear Rout was a Cornish insurrection of 1648 following the end of the First English Civil War. The killing of 70 Cornish Royalists in Penzance on 16 May 1648 prompted a failed rebellion by some 500 Cornish rebels who fought against the Parliamentarian forces of Sir Hardress Waller at a site near the Helford River.

== Military figures of the Cornish campaigns ==
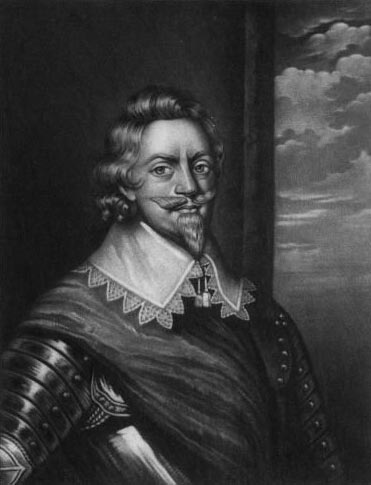
The Earl of Brentford

- Jacob Astley, 1st Baron Astley of Reading
- Arthur Capell, 1st Baron Capell of Hadham
- King Charles I of England
- Prince Charles, Duke of Cornwall
- William Coryton
- Robert Devereux, 3rd Earl of Essex (Parliamentarian)
- Thomas Fairfax (Parliamentarian)
- George Goring, Lord Goring
- Bevil Grenville
- Sir Richard Grenville, 1st Baronet
- Henry Grey, 1st Earl of Stamford (Parliamentarian)
- Ralph Hopton
- Robert Rich, 2nd Earl of Warwick (Parliamentarian)
- Patrick Ruthven, 1st Earl of Brentford
- John Robartes, 1st Earl of Radnor (Parliamentarian)
- William Scawen
- Philip Skippon
- Nicholas Slanning
- John Trevanion

== Sources ==
- Barratt, John (2005). The Civil War in the South-West. Casemate Publishers. ISBN 9781844151462.
- Battle of Braddock Down from the Battlefields Resource Centre
- "Battle of Lostwithiel (1644)". Battlefields of Britain. CastlesFortsBattles.co.uk network. 2019.
- The Battle of Stratton English Heritage pdf
- The Battle of Stratton The Battlefields Resource Centre
- "The History of Boconnoc". Archived from the original on 27 May 2007.
- Marsh, Simon (2020). "Battle of Lostwithiel 21st and 31st August 1644". UK Battlefields Resource Centre. The Battlefields Trust.
- Plant, David (2006). "Lyme & Lostwithiel, 1644". BCW Project. David Plant.
- Stoyle, Mark (2002) West Britons: Cornish Identities and the Early Modern British State. Exeter: University of Exeter Press ISBN 978-085989-687-0
- Stoyle, Mark (2008) "The Afterlife of an Army: The 'Old Cornish' Tertia, 1643-44", Cornish Studies 16. Exeter: University of Exeter Press. p. 26-47. ISBN 978-0-85989-836-2
- Wallis, John (1847). "The Cornwall Register". Liddell and Son.
