= John Chudleigh (MP for East Looe) =

English politician who sat in the House of Commons in 1626

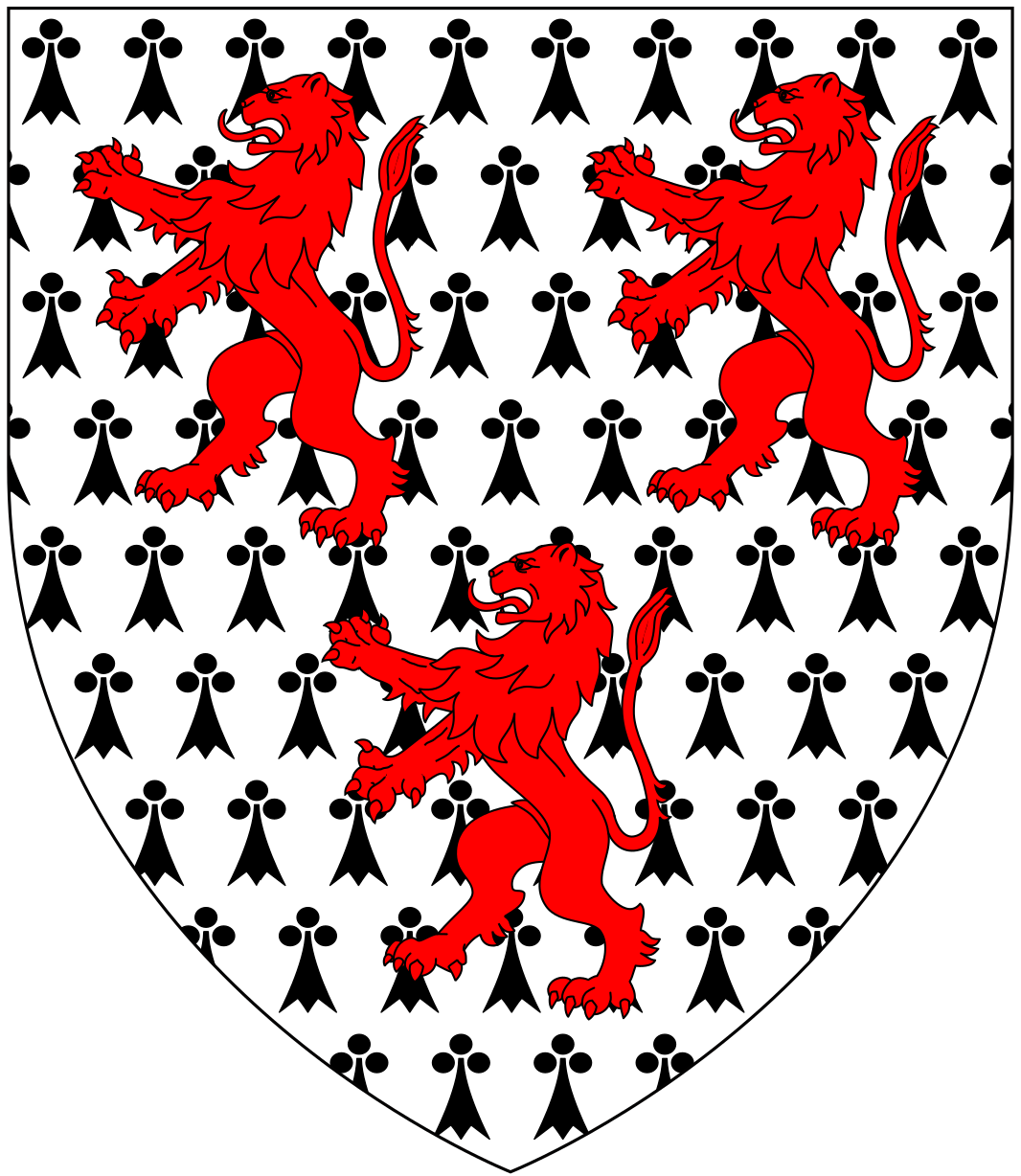
Arms of Chudleigh: Ermine, three lions rampant gules

Sir John Chudleigh (1606 – April 1634) was an English politician who sat in the House of Commons in 1626.

== Origins ==
Chudleigh was the eldest son of Sir George Chudleigh, 1st Baronet (d.1656) of Ashton, Devon, (whom he predeceased), and his wife Mary Strode, eldest daughter of Sir William Strode (died 1637), MP, of Newnham, Plympton St Mary, Devon.

== Career ==
He matriculated at Wadham College, Oxford on 1 June 1621 aged 15 and was awarded BA in 1624 and MA in 1626. He was knighted at Plymouth as a captain on 28 September 1625. In 1626 he was elected Member of Parliament for East Looe. He was incorporated at Cambridge University in 1629.

== Death ==
Chudleigh died at the age of about 28, in his father's lifetime, and his brother George succeeded to the baronetcy.

Parliament of England
Preceded by James Bagge; John Trevor	Member of Parliament for East Looe; 1626; With: James Bagge	Succeeded by William Murray; Paul Speccot
