= Battle of Stratton =

1643 battle

Coordinates: 50.836°N 4.519°W

- Part of the First English Civil War
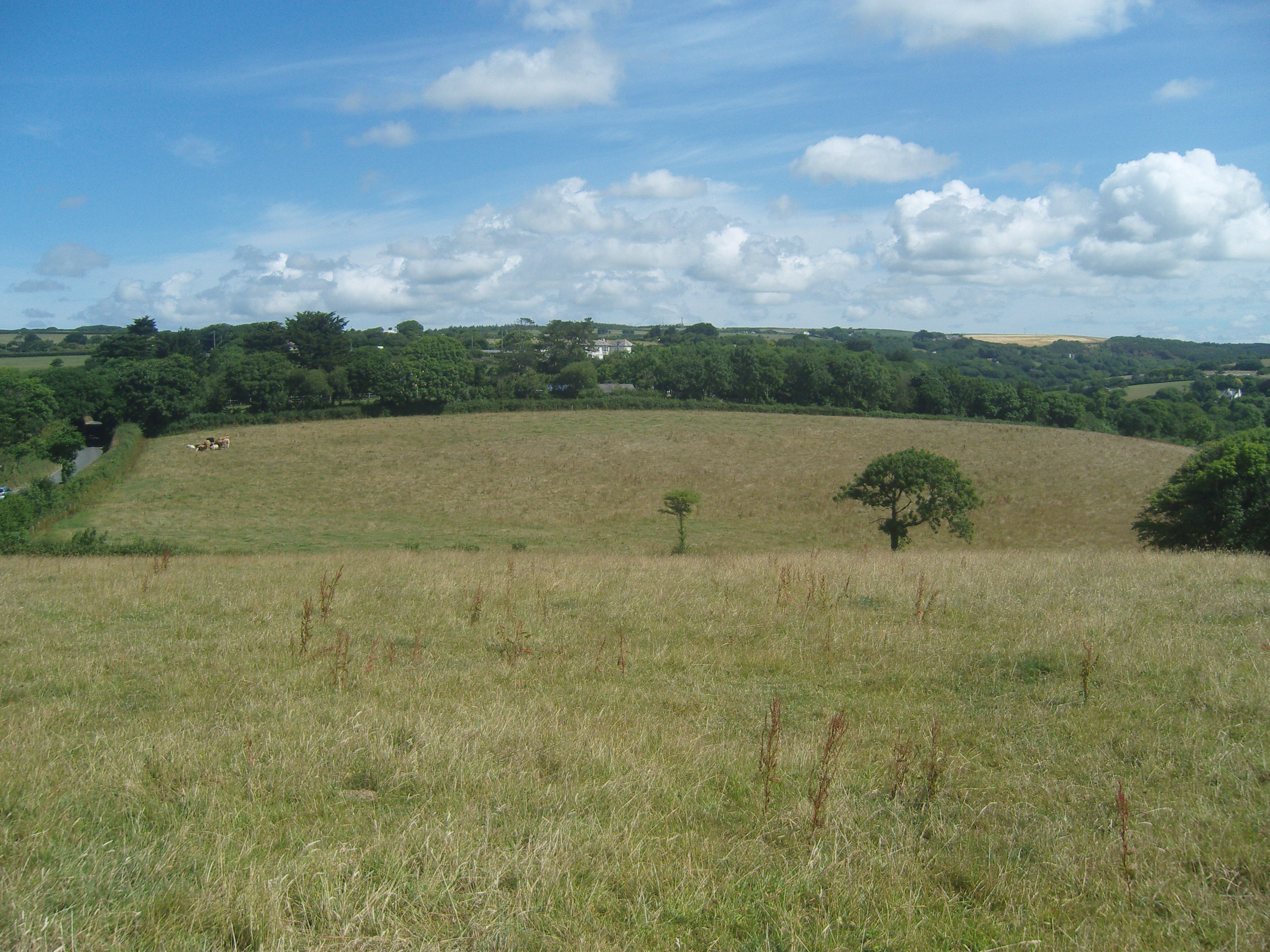
- Site of the Battle of Stratton, in Cornwall
Date	16 May 1643
Location	Stratton, Cornwall
Result	Royalist victory

Belligerents
Royalists	Parliamentarians

Commanders and leaders
Sir Ralph Hopton; Sir Bevil Grenville; Sir Nicholas Slanning	Earl of Stamford; James Chudleigh

Strength
2,400 foot 500 horse 8 guns	5,400 foot 200 horse 13 guns

Casualties and losses
90 dead	300 dead 1,700 captured

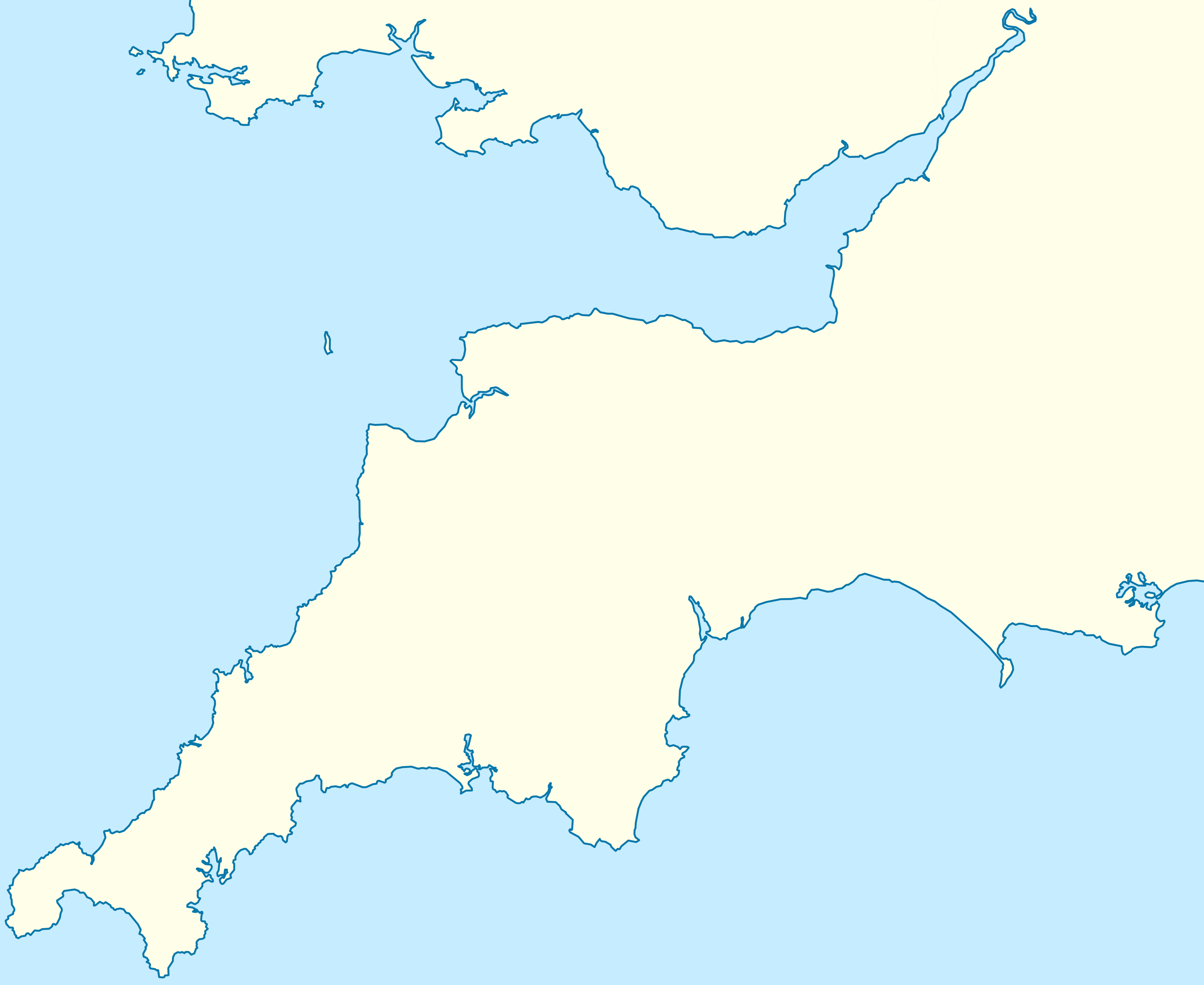
Western England, 1643

The Battle of Stratton, also known as the Battle of Stamford Hill, took place on 16 May 1643, at Stratton in Cornwall, during the First English Civil War. In the battle, the Royalists destroyed the Parliamentarians' field army in Devon and Cornwall.

== Background ==
When the war started, Cornwall was generally supportive of the Royalist cause, while Devon and Somerset were sympathetic to Parliament, though significant opposition existed in both areas. In July 1642, King Charles named the Marquess of Hertford his Lieutenant General in the West, with Sir Ralph Hopton as his deputy. The Earl of Stamford was given command of Parliament's army in the West Country in January 1643, and appointed James Chudleigh his deputy.

At Sourton Down in April, Chudleigh captured letters ordering Hopton to join forces with the Marquis of Hertford and Prince Maurice in Somerset. Hoping to destroy Hopton's army before the Royalists forces could combine, Stamford raised the largest army that he could by stripping Parliamentary garrisons throughout Devon and bringing in reinforcements from Somerset.

After Stamford had his army assembled and began to move into Cornwall, he sent most of his cavalry on a diversionary raid commanded by Sir George Chudleigh to attack the Royalist garrison at Bodmin and prevent Hopton from drawing on the Bodmin garrison to reinforce his army. The ploy seemed to work as ultimately Hopton was only able to assemble a Royalist force of 2,400 foot and 500 horse to counter Stamford's invasion force of 5,600. On 15 May, Stamford and the Parliamentarian army reached Stratton. Stamford deployed his infantry facing southwest along the top of a rectangular hill that ran from the northwest to the southeast.

== Battle ==
At 5:00 am on 16 May, Hopton attacked the hill by means of four widely spaced simultaneous assaults on the face of the hill. Each of the assault columns was composed of 600 foot soldiers and 2 guns. Hopton led the first column from the southeast, while Francis Bassett led a second column and attacked from the northwest. The final two columns led by Sir Bevil Grenville and Sir Nicholas Slanning operated as separate units and attacked from the southwest. In this manner, the Royalist columns focused the strength of their attacks at four particular places along a long and dispersed Parliamentary line. In reserve behind the four Royalist columns was their cavalry.

Close action fighting followed for the next eight hours, with determined efforts on both sides. With the Royalist troops running short of ammunition, the Parliamentarian pikemen under Major-General James Chudleigh charged Grenville's regiment at push of pike. Grenville was knocked over and his troops shaken, but Sir John Berkeley's musketeers made a counter-attack that stopped the Parliamentarian momentum and began to push them back up the hill.

Against the odds, the Royalist troops pushed forward reaching the top of the hill before 4:00 pm. At that point the Parliamentarians gave way and Stamford's army fled the field. Three hundred Parliamentarian dead remained on the field, together with seventeen hundred prisoners. Royalist losses were estimated to be 90 men.

== Aftermath ==
James Chudleigh was taken prisoner and promptly defected to the Royalists. The Earl of Stamford retreated to Barnstaple and then to Exeter, blaming the defeat on Chudleigh. George Chudleigh abandoned the Bodmin campaign and returned to Exeter. In the end, Hopton had secured Cornwall for the King and would take control of most of Devonshire within a matter of days.
