= Sir George Chudleigh, 1st Baronet =

English landowner and politician

Sir George Chudleigh MP, JP
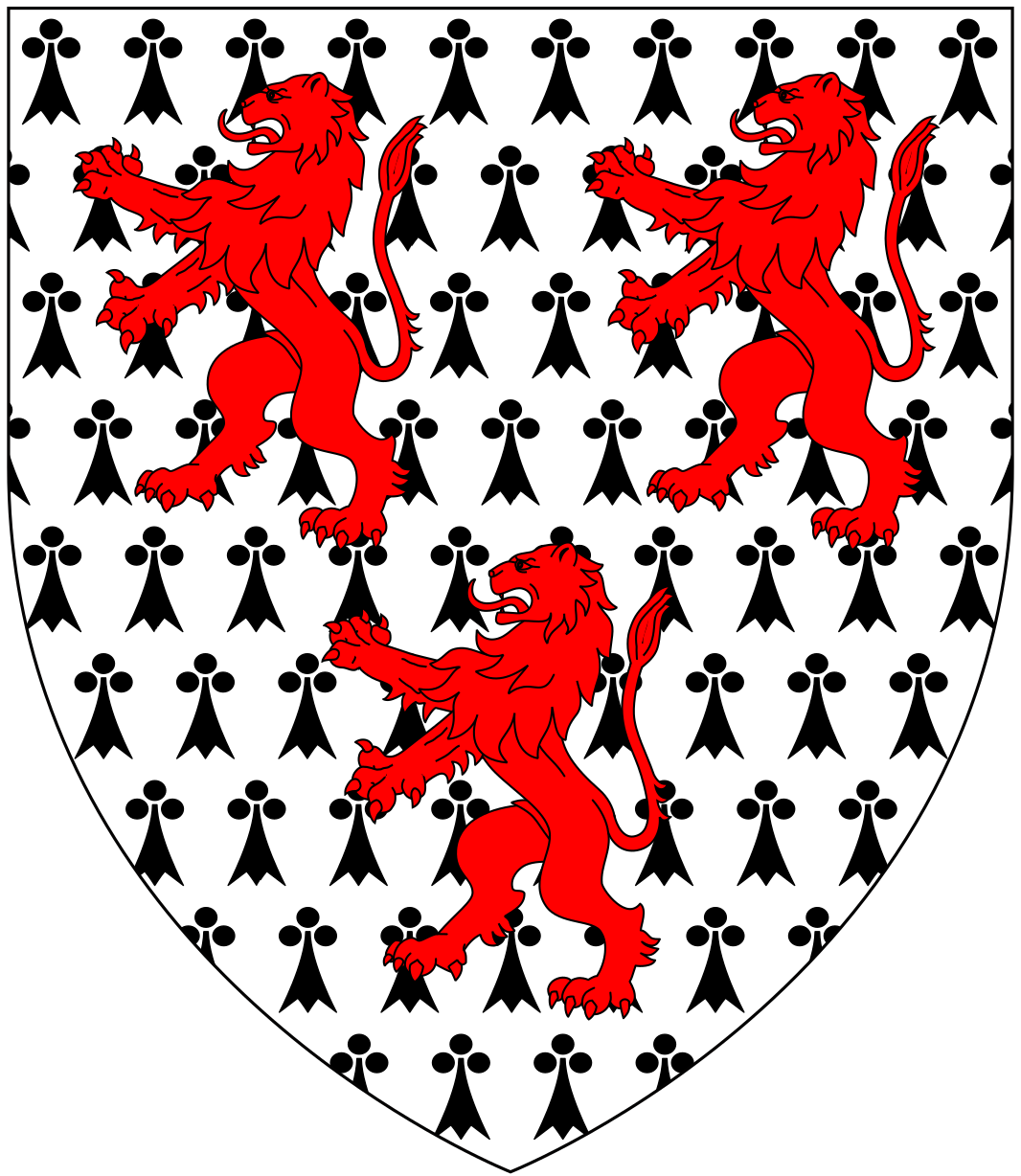
- Chudleigh coat of arms

Governor of Exeter
- In office 1642–1643

Member of Parliament for Lostwithiel November 1621 - February 1622
- In office June 1625 – August 1625

Tiverton
- In office February 1624 – May 1624

Member of Parliament for East Looe
- In office April 1614 – June 1614

Member of Parliament for Mitchell, Cornwall
- In office September 1601 – December 1601

Personal details
- Born: 15 June 1582 Ashton Manor, Devon
- Died: 15 January 1658 (aged 79) Ashton Manor, Devon
- Resting place: St John the Baptist, Ashton
- Spouse: Mary Strode
- Relations: Sir William Strode; James Chudleigh;
- Children: Nine
- Parent(s): John Chudleigh (1565–1589); Elizabeth Speke (died 1628)
- Education: New College, Oxford
- Occupation: Landowner and politician

Military service
- Allegiance: England
- Battles/wars: First English Civil War

Sir George Chudleigh, 1st Baronet (c. 1578 – 15 January 1658), of Ashton, Devon, was an English landowner and politician, who sat in the House of Commons at various times between 1601 and 1625. He had close family connections to a group of Devon Presbyterians, including Sir William Strode.

He generally supported Parliament in the political disputes prior to the 1642 to 1646 First English Civil War. In its opening stages, he served as a Parliamentary Lieutenant-General, and Governor of Exeter, but was one of many on both sides who wanted a negotiated peace. He resigned his commission in September 1643.

The Royalists held Devon from 1643 to early 1646; he garrisoned Ashton on their behalf, while avoiding active involvement. Fined by the Parliamentary Sequestration Committee in 1647, his connections meant he escaped major punishment. He died in January 1658.

== Biography ==
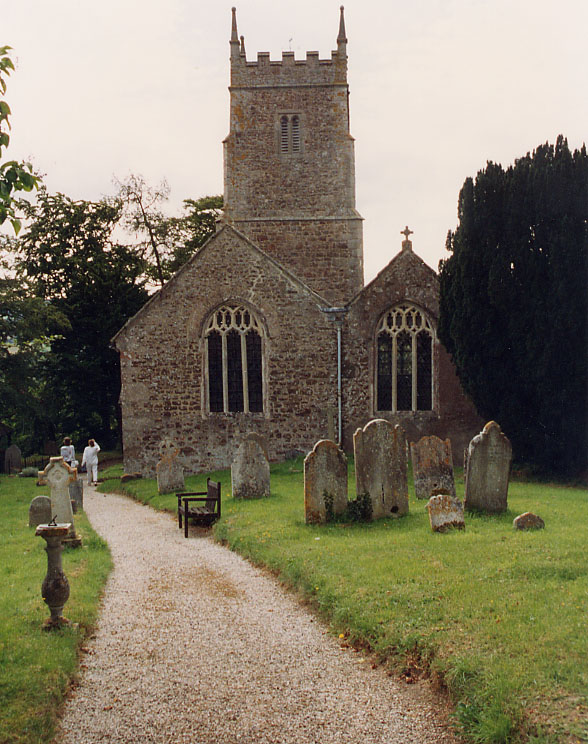
St John the Baptist's, Ashton, where Sir George was buried in 1658

George Chudleigh was born in 1578, eldest son of John Chudleigh (1565–1589), and Elizabeth Speke, died 1628, daughter of Sir George Speke (c.1530-1584). His grandfather was one of the Marian exiles, Protestants who left England during the 1553 to 1558 reign of Queen Mary.

His father was a friend of Thomas Cavendish and Sir Walter Raleigh, who mortgaged his estates to fund a raid on Spanish colonies in the Pacific; like many others, it ended in disaster, and he died at sea in 1589. Although she inherited valuable lands from her father, his wife Elizabeth had to sell the family estates at Chudleigh, and spent years in legal proceedings with the few survivors of the expedition.

However, both George's sisters made good marriages; Bridget, ca 1584 to 1612, to Sir Richard Carew, Dorothy to Sir Reginald Mohun. His younger brother John Chudleigh, ca 1584 to 1634, followed his father and became a sea captain, serving on Sir Walter Raleigh's final voyage in 1617.

In 1606, George married Mary Strode, eldest daughter of Sir William Strode; they had nine sons and nine daughters. Those who survived to adulthood included John Chudleigh (1606–1634), George (1612–1691), who became his heir, Anne (1614-1704), James (1618-1643), Christopher (1620-?), Thomas (1622-1668), Alice (1624-1664) and Mary (1608-1651)

== Career ==
Chudleigh attended New College, Oxford, graduating on 26 November 1596, aged 18; while foreign travel was then considered part of a gentleman's education, there is no record of him doing so. His connections to the Carews, Mohuns, and his father-in-law William Strode, made him part of a strongly anti-Catholic, Puritan Devon grouping. (Note: Puritan was a term for anyone who wanted to reform, or 'purify', the Church of England; in the 17th century, what are now different sects were part of the national church. Presbyterians were the most prominent, but there were many others, such as Congregationalists.) In 1601, he was elected Member of Parliament for St. Michaels, a seat controlled by the Carews.

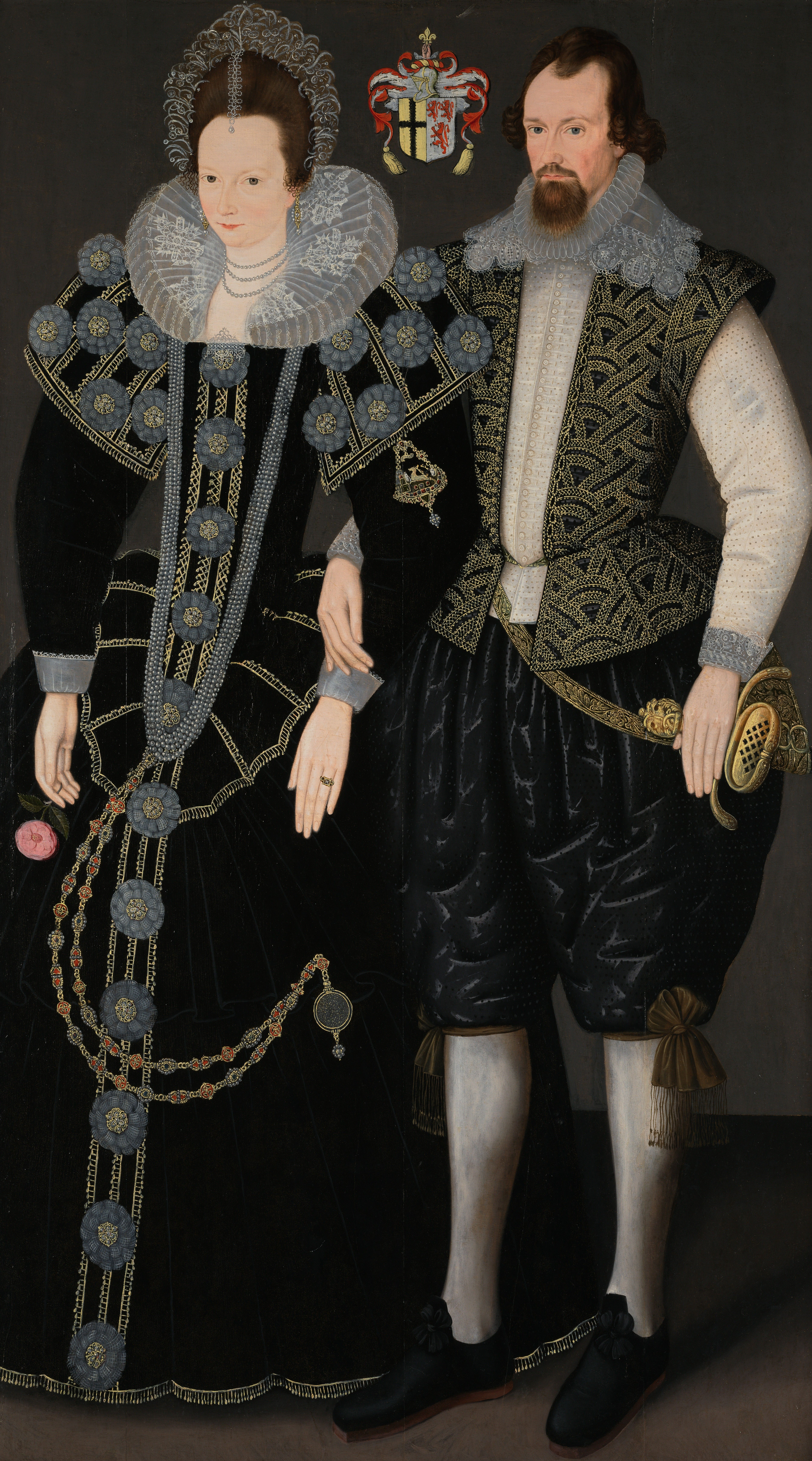
George's sister Dorothy, and her husband Sir Reginald Mohun

In 1614, he was elected MP for East Looe, then Lostwithiel in 1621, both seats controlled by his brother-in-law, Sir Reginald. He purchased a baronetcy in 1622, becoming Sir George; (Note: Selling baronetcies was a tactic employed by James and Charles I to raise money) in 1624, he was elected for Tiverton, then Lostwithiel again in 1625. Increasingly involved in local affairs, when offered East Looe again in 1626, he stood aside in favour of his son John.

From 1625 to 1628, Chudleigh was closely involved in levying taxes for maritime expeditions under the Duke of Buckingham, his brother John Chudleigh serving as a senior naval commander. Intended to support the Protestant cause in the Thirty Years War, they proved expensive failures, and only his assassination in August 1628 saved Buckingham from being impeached by Parliament. The fleets were based in Devon and Cornwall, who were forced to feed, house and equip the sailors; Chudleigh's strenuous objections on behalf of his friends and neighbors made him unpopular with Charles I.

Sir John Eliot, another member of the Cornish gentry, and Chudleigh's father-in-law, Sir William Strode, led a campaign by Parliament, refusing to grant more taxes without guarantees. In 1629, Charles responded by suspending it; Eliot died in the Tower of London in 1632, while Strode was imprisoned until 1640. Although more moderate than either, Sir George also shared their concern at the rise of the Durham House Group within the Church of England, which threatened the Jacobean religious settlement.

When the First English Civil War began in 1642, Chudleigh was one of Parliament's leaders in Devon, and appointed governor of Exeter. Like many, he went to war with great reluctance, and in January 1642, travelled to London to submit a petition from Devon to Parliament. One of thirty-eight other county petitions, it was the only one to urge a negotiated settlement between Charles and Parliament.

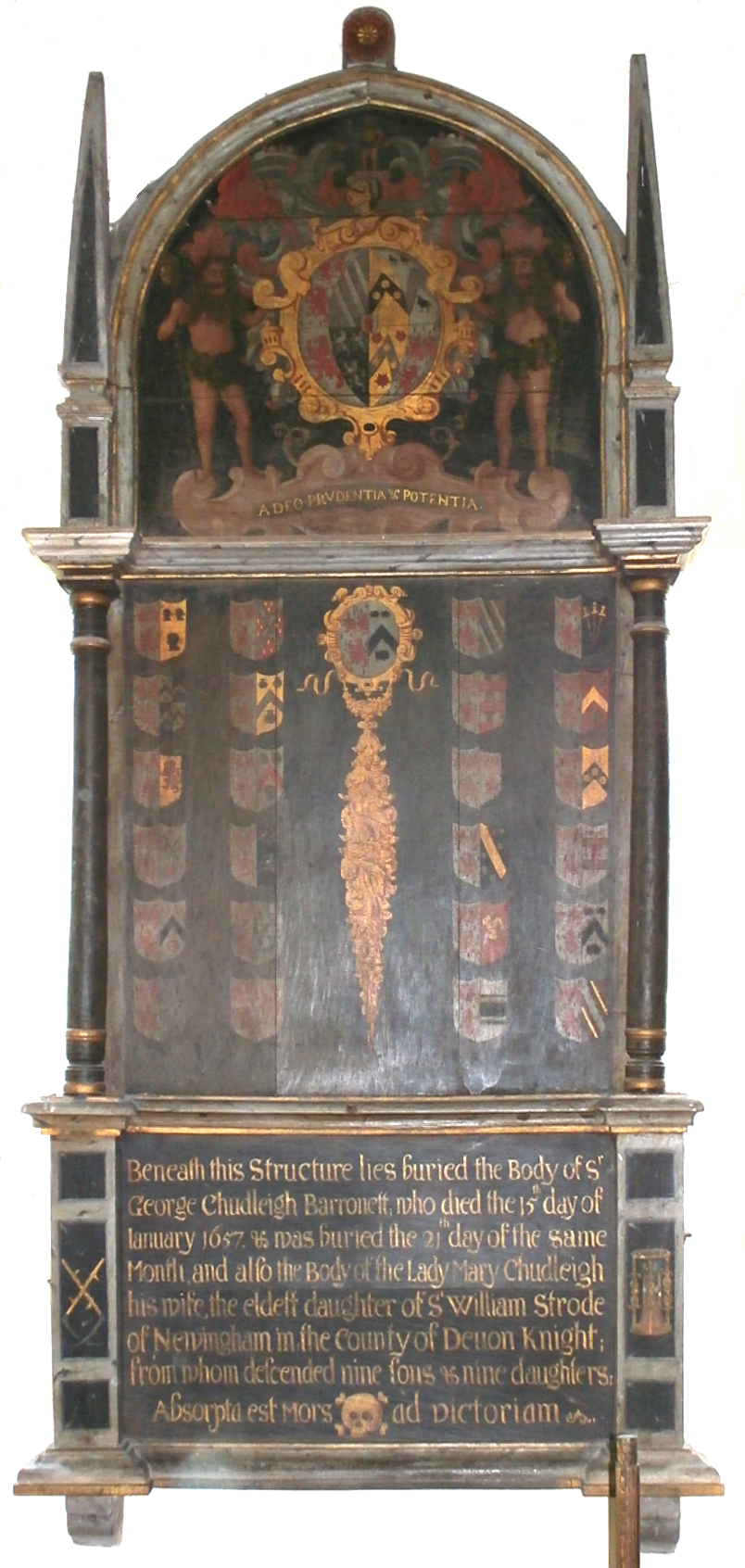
Sir George's monument, St John the Baptist

When the Earl of Stamford was appointed Parliamentary commander in the West Country, James Chudleigh became his deputy, while Sir George was appointed Lieutenant-General of cavalry. Following defeat at Stratton in May, James switched sides after being captured, and Stamford accused him of treachery. As governor, Sir George was in Exeter when it was besieged by Royalists, along with Stamford; after the town surrendered in early September, he resigned his commission.

He set out his reasons in A declaration published in the county of Devon by that grand ambo-dexter, Sir George Chudleigh; this argued that while he opposed arbitrary measures, "the destruction of a kingdom cannot be the way to save it". He held Ashton Manor as a Royalist garrison until December 1645, when he surrendered it to the New Model Army; in reality, he avoided taking any part in the war. He was fined by the Sequestration Committee in 1647 as a Royalist sympathiser, although he may not have made any payments.

Of his sons, it has been suggested George and Christopher 'fought for Parliament', but there is no record of this. James died of wounds on 6 October 1643; Thomas served in Ireland until October 1643, when his regiment returned to England, but next appears as a surgeon in Exeter in 1648. One nephew, Sir Alexander Carew, was executed by Parliament in 1644 for plotting to betray Plymouth to the Royalists; another, John Carew, signed Charles' death warrant in 1649, and was hanged, drawn and quartered in October 1660 as a regicide.

Although he refused to take the 1650 Oath of loyalty to the Commonwealth, he was discharged under the April 1652 Act of General Pardon and Oblivion. It is unclear whether his estates were ever actually sequestered. He died 15 January 1658, and buried in St John the Baptist church, Ashton; he was succeeded as baronet by his son George.

== Sources ==
- Andrews, Kenneth R (1959). English Privateering Voyages to the West Indies, 1588-1595 (2010 ed.). Hakluyt Society. ISBN 978-1409414773.
- Andrews, Kenneth R (1964). Elizabethan Privateering: English Privateering During the Spanish War, 1585–1603. Cambridge University Press. ISBN 978-0521040327.
- Carlton, C (1992). Going to the Wars: The Experience of the British Civil Wars 1638-1651. Routledge. ISBN 978-0415032827.
- Clarendon, Earl of (1702). The History of the Rebellion and Civil Wars in England; Volume III (2019 ed.). Wentworth Press. ISBN 978-0469445765.
- Foster, Andrew (2005). "Durham House group". Oxford Dictionary of National Biography (online ed.). Oxford University Press. doi:10.1093/ref:odnb/72182. (Subscription, Wikipedia Library access or UK public library membership required.)
- Fuller-Eliott-Drake, Lady Elizabeth (1911). The family and heirs of Sir Francis Drake. Smith Elder.
- Henning, Basil Duke (2010). CHUDLEIGH, Thomas (b.c.1649), of Golden Square, Westminster in The History of Parliament: the House of Commons 1660-1690 (Online ed.). Cambridge University Press.
- Hopper, Andrew (2012). Turncoats and Renegadoes: Changing Sides during the English Civil Wars. OUP. ISBN 978-0199575855.
- Hunneyball, Paul (2010). CHUDLEIGH, George (1582-1658), of Ashton, Devon in The History of Parliament: the House of Commons 1604-1629 (Online ed.). Cambridge University Press.
- Hyland, Paul (2003). Ralegh's Last Journey: A Tale of Madness, Vanity and Treachery. HarperCollins. ISBN 978-0007106004.
- Pole, Sir John William de la (1791). Collections Towards a Description of the County of Devon. Smith Elder.
- Royle, Trevor (2004). Civil War: The Wars of the Three Kingdoms 1638–1660 (2006 ed.). Abacus. ISBN 978-0-349-11564-1.
- Wolffe, Mary (2008). "Chudleigh, Sir George, baronet". Oxford Dictionary of National Biography (online ed.). Oxford University Press. doi:10.1093/ref:odnb/5381. (Subscription, Wikipedia Library access or UK public library membership required.)

Baronetage of England
New creation	Baronet (of Ashton); 1622–1658	Succeeded by George Chudleigh
