= Chudleigh baronets =

Extinct baronetcy in the Baronetage of England

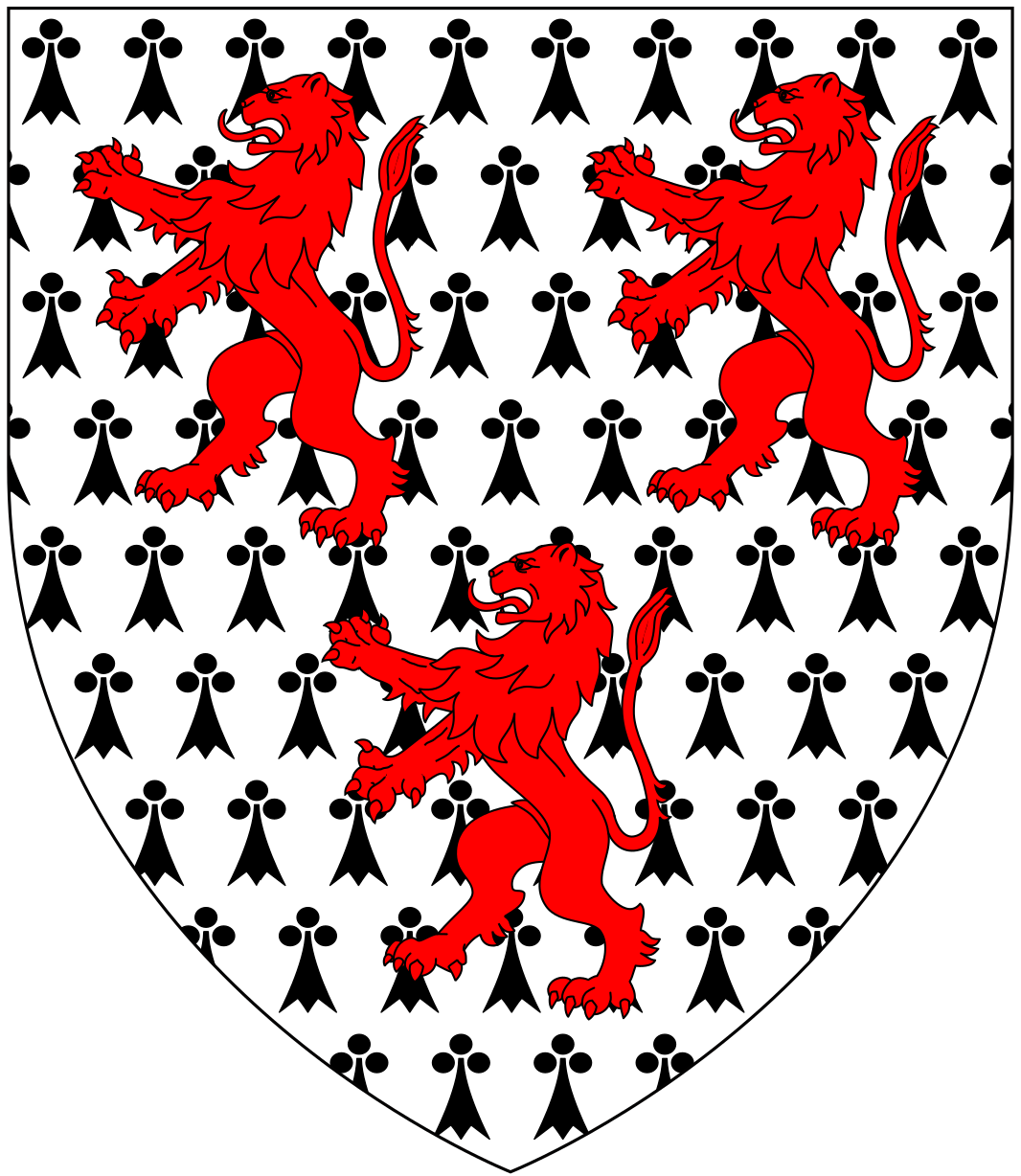
Arms of Chudleigh: Ermine, three lions rampant gules

The Chudleigh Baronetcy, of Ashton in the County of Devon, was a title in the Baronetage of England. It was created on 1 August 1622 for George Chudleigh (d.1656), Member of Parliament for St Michael's, East Looe, Lostwithiel and Tiverton. The title became extinct on the death of the sixth Baronet in 1745.

John Chudleigh (born 1606), the elder son of the 1st Baronet, predeceased his father, having served as Member of Parliament for East Looe in 1626. Mary Chudleigh, 2nd daughter of the 1st Baronet, married Colonel Hugh Clifford and was the mother of Thomas Clifford, 1st Baron Clifford of Chudleigh, elevated to the peerage in 1672. James Chudleigh, fourth son of the 1st Baronet, was a military commander killed in the First English Civil War. The wife of the 3rd Baronet was the notable poet Mary, Lady Chudleigh (1656-1710). Elizabeth Chudleigh (1720-1788), the daughter of Colonel Thomas Chudleigh, younger son of the 3rd Baronet, was the wife of Augustus Hervey, 3rd Earl of Bristol (1724-1779) and the bigamous wife of Evelyn Pierrepont, 2nd Duke of Kingston-upon-Hull (1711-1773), who built for her a grand London townhouse called Chudleigh House (later called Kingston House) on Knightsbridge in the City of Westminster. The 4th Baronet (died 1738) abandoned the ancient family seat of Ashton and built himself nearby a grand mansion named Haldon House, influenced by Buckingham House in London.

== Chudleigh baronets, of Ashton (1622) ==
- Sir George Chudleigh, 1st Baronet (c. 1578–1658)
  - John Chudleigh (1606–before 1634)
  - James Chudleigh (c. 1618–1643)
- Sir George Chudleigh, 2nd Baronet (1612–1691)
- Sir George Chudleigh, 3rd Baronet (c. 1644–1718)
- Sir George Chudleigh, 4th Baronet (c. 1683–1738)
- Sir Thomas Chudleigh, 5th Baronet (died 1741)
- Sir John Chudleigh, 6th Baronet (died 1745)
