= Manor of Ashton =

Manor in England

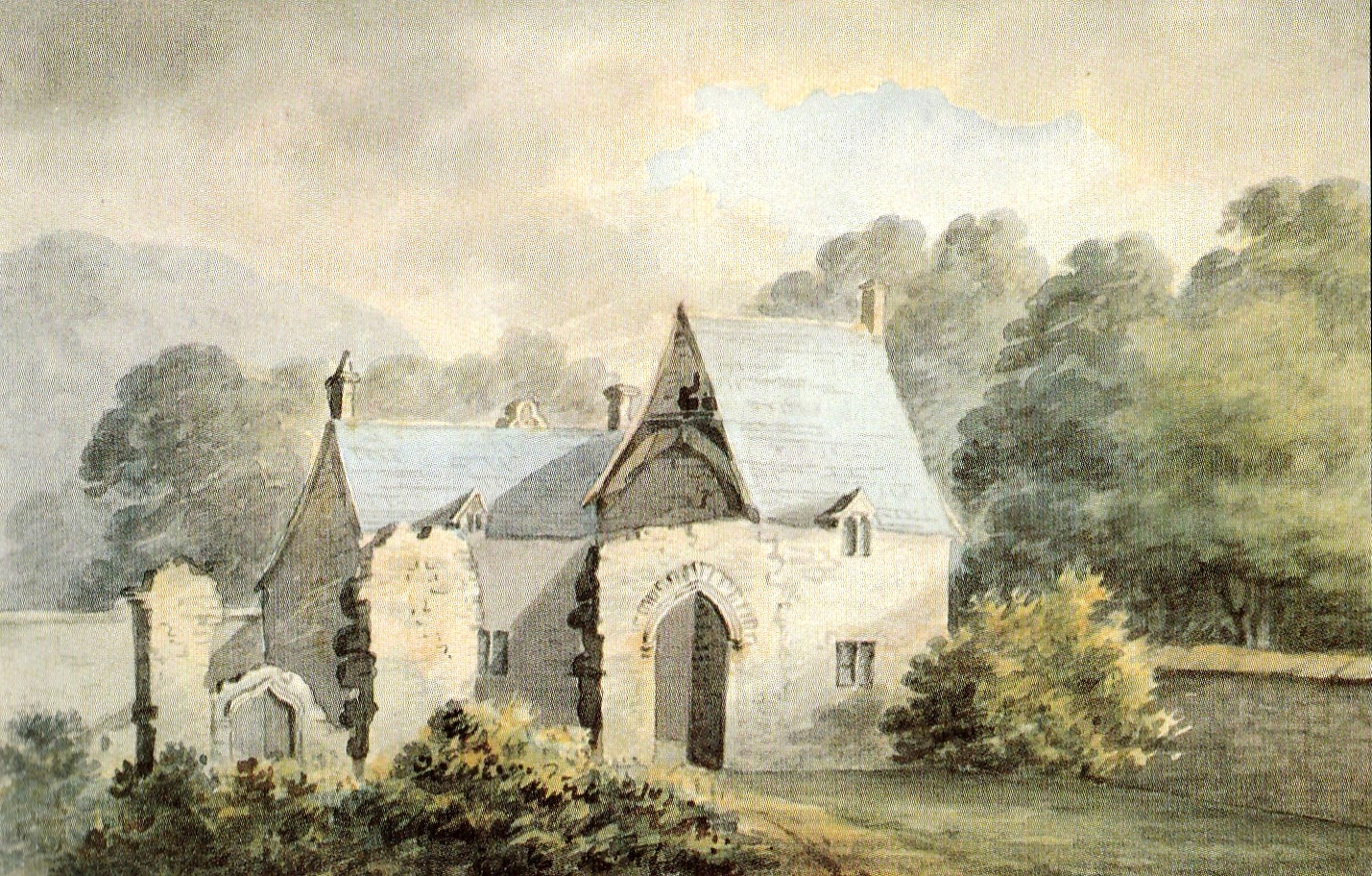
The dilapidated Ashton House in 1794, as painted by Rev. John Swete

The Manor of Ashton (anciently Asseriston, Ashriston, etc.) was a historic manor in Devonshire, England, of which the manor house was called Ashton House (or Ashton Place), in the parish of Ashton, situated about 6 miles south-west of Exeter, on the western slopes of the Haldon Hills. It was long the seat of the Chudleigh family, from about 1320 to 1745, which originated at the manor of Chudleigh, 3 miles south of Ashton, and for which was created the Chudleigh baronetcy in 1622. It was abandoned by Sir George Chudleigh, 4th Baronet (died 1738) who in 1735 built himself nearby a grand mansion named Haldon House, on the east side of the Haldon Hills, influenced by Buckingham House in London, and moved his residence there.

Ashton House was an abandoned ruin when painted in 1794 by Rev. John Swete (d.1821), but part of the former mansion survives as a grade II* listed farmhouse now known as "Place Barton", formerly "Lower Barton", at Higher Ashton (in which hamlet is situated the parish church of St John the Baptist), not to be confused with the present house known as "Higher Barton" also at Higher Ashton (the hamlet of "Lower Ashton" being situated a few hundred yards to the west). Place Barton was purchased in 1997 by John Birkin, a director of television advertisements and his wife Emma, a television producer, and much restoration work has been undertaken, including the building of a new thatched roof for the "Great Barn", as of 2020 hired out as a wedding venue.
