= Battle of Braddock Down =

First English Civil War battle

Coordinates: 50°24′51″N 4°34′2″W

- Part of the First English Civil War
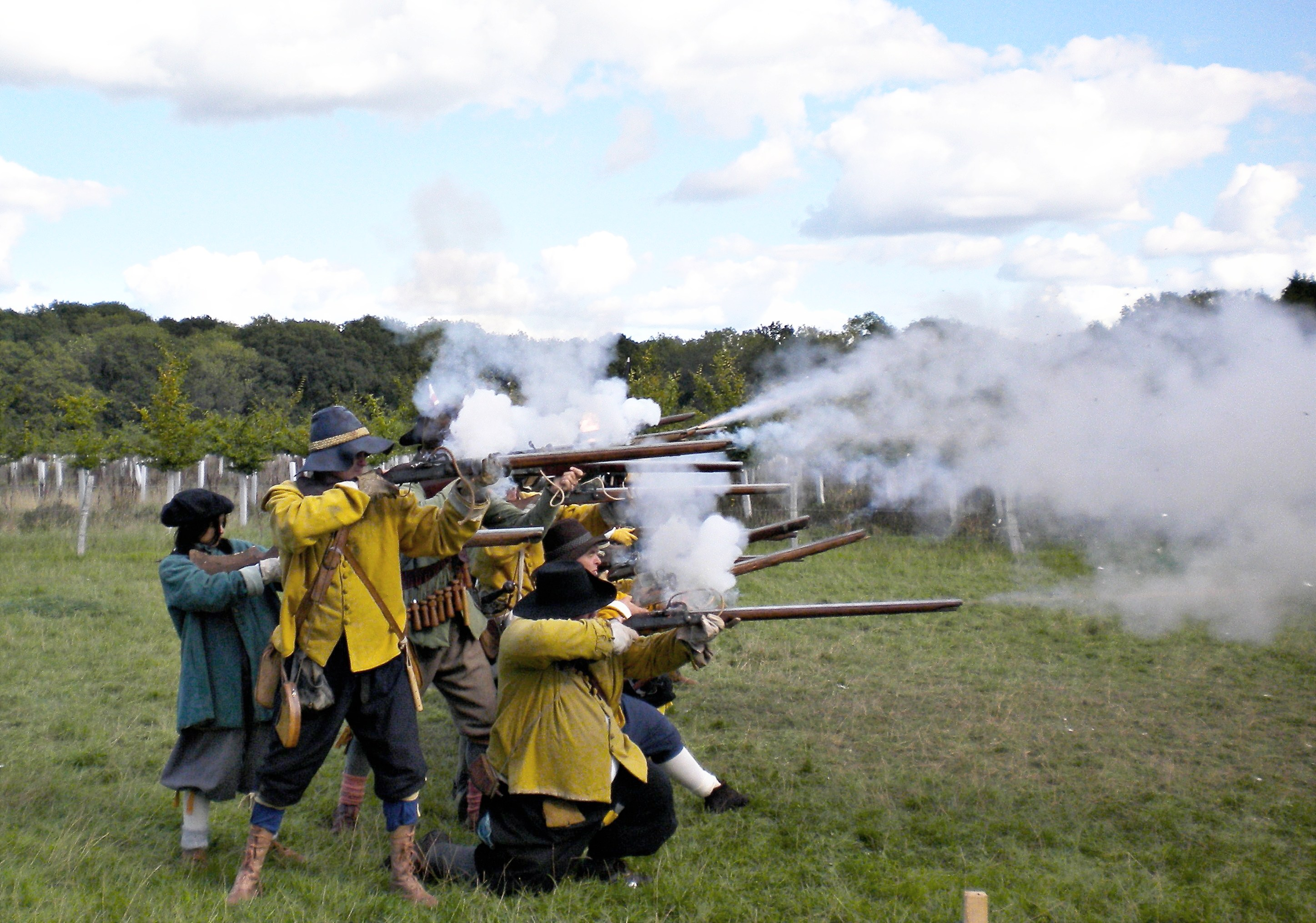
- Historical re-enactment of the Battle of Braddock Down in England
Date	19 January 1643
Location	Braddock Down, Cornwall
Result	Royalist victory

Belligerents
Royalists	Parliamentarians

Commanders and leaders
Sir Ralph Hopton	William Ruthven

Strength
5,000	4,000

Casualties and losses
Low	200 killed 1,500 captured
- Cornwall

The Battle of Braddock Down took place during the south-western campaign of the First English Civil War. It was fought on open ground in Cornwall, on 19 January 1643. An apparently easy victory for the Royalists under Sir Ralph Hopton secured Cornwall for King Charles and confirmed Hopton's reputation as a commander. Hopton also gained respect for the mercy shown to his foe, of whom 1,500 were captured during and after the battle. The precise location of the battlefield is a matter of dispute, though English Heritage believe it to be within parkland at Boconnoc.

== Prelude ==
Hopton had been attempting to march into Devon from Cornwall but was prevented from doing so by the Parliamentarian force at Plymouth under the Earl of Stamford and William Ruthven. He retreated across Bodmin Moor and on 17 January was able to replenish his food and ammunition stores from three Parliamentarian ships that sought refuge from a storm at Falmouth and were captured.

Sir Ralph Hopton's Royalist forces had been camped the night of 18/19 January at Boconnoc. On breaking camp, their dragoon vanguard encountered Parliamentarian cavalry to the east, and discovered Ruthven's army deployed on Braddock Down. Ruthven had been unwilling to wait for reinforcements sent by Stamford to arrive and had marched to face the Royalists in the hope of a quick victory. Ruthven initially believed he was facing stragglers from Hopton's main army but was instead lured into facing the entire Royalist force.

== Battle ==
Ruthven had more cavalry, but Hopton had more infantry and also two light cannons. These he kept concealed during the first two hours of the battle, which was largely a long-range musket duel. After deciding to attack, Hopton ordered his Cornish foot under Sir Bevil Grenville to charge. The defending Parliamentarians, drawn from newly raised and inexperienced forces, fired just one volley at the Cornish, causing two casualties, then turned and fled.

== Aftermath ==
The defeated Parliamentarians were pursued into Liskeard where over 1,200 were captured. In all, 1,500 Parliamentarians were captured and a further 200 killed with few losses on the Royalist side. Hopton drove another band of survivors out of Saltash, where they had fled after the battle. The battle cost the Royalists little but had severe consequences for the Parliamentarians, who lost the prospect of controlling Cornwall. Hopton's reputation as a commander was bolstered by his victory here and he was also commended for the mercy shown to his surrendered foe.

== Battlefield ==
The location of the battle is a matter of dispute. English Heritage considers the location to be slightly south of Middle Taphouse. However traditional opinion places the battle within Boconnoc Park. The exact location is not likely to be discovered without archaeological excavation.

A cross from Lanlivery was made into the upper section of "The Monument" on Druids Hill, St Winnow. It was brought from Lanlivery in 1846; this monument commemorates the loss of life in the Battle of Braddock Down.

== See also ==
- Cornwall in the English Civil War
