= Godolphin =

Godolphin is a Cornish aristocratic family name and may refer to:

- Baron Godolphin, an English title of nobility
- Earl of Godolphin, an English title of nobility
- Godolphin baronet, an English title of nobility
- Godolphin and Latymer School, an independent school for girls in London (formerly the Godolphin School)
- Godolphin Arabian, an 18th-century racehorse owned by Francis Godolphin, 2nd Earl of Godolphin
- Godolphin Cross, a village in Cornwall in England
- Godolphin Estate, a National Trust property, and former seat of the Godolphin family, situated in Godolphin Cross, United Kingdom
- Godolphin–Marlborough ministry, the ministry of Sidney Godolphin, 1st Earl of Godolphin
- Godolphin (racing), a thoroughbred racing stable
- Godolphin School, an independent boarding school for girls in Salisbury in England
- Godolphin (novel), a novel by Edward Bulwer-Lytton published in 1833 and revised in 1840
- Godolphin, a fictional town in the 1968 Walt Disney comedy film, Blackbeard's Ghost

== See also ==
- Francis Godolphin (disambiguation)
- Sidney Godolphin (disambiguation)
- William Godolphin (disambiguation)
