= William Godolphin =

William Godolphin may refer to:

- Sir William Godolphin (Warden of the Stannaries) (c. 1486 – c. 1570), English Member of Parliament (MP) and High Sheriff of Cornwall
- Sir William Godolphin (1515–1570), his son, with whom he has been confused by some authorities
- Sir William Godolphin (1547–1589), nephew of the previous, MP for Helston 1586-7
- Sir William Godolphin (1567–1613), MP for Cornwall
- William Godolphin (1611–1636), his son, a Governor of the Scilly Islands
- William Godolphin, Marquess of Blandford (1700–1731), English nobleman
- William Godolphin (Royalist) (1605–1663), who commanded a Royal regiment during the English Civil War and was MP for Helston 1640
- Sir William Godolphin, 1st Baronet (died 1710), MP for Helston 1665–1679
- Sir William Godolphin (diplomat) (1635–1696), English ambassador to Spain, MP for Camelford
