= Sidney Godolphin =

Sidney Godolphin is the name of:

- Sidney Godolphin (colonel) (1652–1732), Member of Parliament for fifty years
- Sidney Godolphin (poet) (1610–1643), English poet
- Sidney Godolphin, 1st Earl of Godolphin (c. 1640–1712), leading British politician, MP for Helston in Cornwall 1665–Feb 1679, Sept 1679–1685
- Sidney Godolphin Alexander Shippard (1838–1902), British colonial administrator
