= Francis Godolphin =

Francis Godolphin is the name of:

- Sir Francis Godolphin (1540–1608), governor of the Isles of Scilly, builder of Star Castle
- Sir Francis Godolphin (died about 1640), younger son of the above, MP for St Ives and Cornwall
- Francis Godolphin (died 1652) of Treveneage, MP for St Ives
- Sir Francis Godolphin (1605–1667) of Godolphin, MP for Helston, dedicatee of Hobbes' Leviathan
- Francis Godolphin (died 1675), Auditor of the imprests in 1674
- Francis Godolphin, 2nd Earl of Godolphin (1678–1766), British politician
- Francis Godolphin, 2nd Baron Godolphin (1706–1785), British politician
- Francis Osborne, 1st Baron Godolphin (1777–1850), British politician
- Francis R. B. Godolphin (1903–1974), dean and classics Professor at Princeton University.

== See also ==
- Francis Godolphin Waldron
