= List of governors of Scilly =

The following persons served as Governor of the Isles of Scilly, an archipelago of islands and islets off the coast of Cornwall. Governor was a military commission given by the monarch in consultation with the Admiralty in recognition of the islands' strategic position. The office of governor was pre-eminent in military law but not in civil law, where the magistracy was vested in the proprietor, who had a leasehold from the Duchy of Cornwall for the islands' land area. Usually the proprietor served as governor, although, according to Robert Heath, a Major Bennett was governor for a short time before proprietor Francis Godolphin, 2nd Earl of Godolphin was commissioned on 7 July 1733. The proprietor/governor was non-resident, delegating the military functions to a lieutenant-governor and the civil functions to a council of twelve residents.

An early governor of Scilly was Thomas Godolphin, whose son Francis received a lease on the Isles in 1568. The Godolphins were styled Governors of Scilly and they and their Osborne relatives held the position until 1831, when George Osborne, 6th Duke of Leeds surrendered the lease and the islands returned to direct rule from the Duchy of Cornwall. In 1834, Augustus Smith acquired the lease from the Duchy for £20,000 and created the title Lord Proprietor of the Isles of Scilly. The lease remained in his family until it expired for most of the isles in 1920, ownership reverting again to the Duchy of Cornwall. Today, members of the Dorrien-Smith family still hold a lease covering the lands of the island of Tresco.

- 1570–1608 Sir Francis Godolphin (1534–1608)
- 1608–1613 Sir William Godolphin (1565–1613)
- 1613–1619 John Goldophin (1577–1619)
- 1619–1624 (office vacant)
- 1624–1626 Sir Francis Godolphin (1578–1637)
- 1626–1647 Sir Francis Godolphin (1605–1667)
- 1647–1648 Colonel Joseph Buller
- 1648–1651 Sir John Grenville (1628–1701)
- 1651–1660 Lieut. Colonel Joseph Hunkin (1610-1661)
- 1660–1667 Sir Francis Godolphin (1605–1667)
- 1667–1680 Sir William Godolphin (1640–1710)
- 1680–1682 William Godolphin (1659–1682)
- 1682–1689 Francis Godolphin (1661–1702)
- 1689–1700 Sir William Godolphin, 1st Baronet (1645–1712)
- 1700–1732 Colonel Sidney Godolphin (1651–1732)
- 1732–1733 (see discussion above)
- 1733–1766 Francis Godolphin, 2nd Earl of Godolphin and 1st Baron Godolphin of Helston (1678–1766)
- 1766–1785 Francis Godolphin, 2nd Baron Godolphin of Helston (1706–1785)
- 1785–1799 Francis Osborne, 5th Duke of Leeds (1751–1799)
- 1800–1831 George Osborne, 6th Duke of Leeds (1775–1838)
- 1831–1834 (Duchy of Cornwall direct rule)
- 1834–1872 Augustus Smith (1804–1872)
- 1872–1918 Thomas Dorrien-Smith (1846–1918)
- 1918–1920 Arthur Dorrien-Smith (1876–1955)
