= William Godolphin (Royalist) =

English soldier and politician

Sir William Godolphin (1605 – November 1663) was an English soldier and politician who sat in the House of Commons in 1640. He fought for the Royalist cause in the English Civil War.

Godolphin arms, Gules, an eagle with two heads, displayed between three fleurs-de-lys, two and one, argent

== Biography ==
Godolphin was born at Treveneague, Cornwall. He was the son of Sir John Godolphin and Judith Meridith. His father died before he was 21. His uncle was Sir William Godolphin. Godolphin became active with the Cornish trained bands in 1638, and may have taken part in the King's Scottish Wars in 1640.

In April 1640, Godolphin was elected Member of Parliament for Helston in the Short Parliament. He was probably also elected MP for Cornwall, but the Short Parliament did not last long enough for such situations to be resolved.

On the outbreak of the Civil War in 1642, Godolphin was colonel of a trained band raised for the King in Cornwall. By October 1642 the Royalists had driven Parliamentary forces from Cornwall but as the trained bands could only fight within Cornwall, the Royalist commander Hopton raised a new volunteer force. Godolphin raised one regiment made up from part-time volunteers in his trained bands. The other regiments were formed under Nicholas Slanning, Sir Bevill Grenvile, Colonel John Trevanion and Warwick, Lord Mohun. Hopton first used his forces to make an unsuccessful attempt on Exeter then fell back on Plympton, took it, and invested Plymouth on 1 December. Later that month they took Alphington, Powderham, and Topsham but failed to capture Exeter in a night attack. Their first field battle was Braddock (actually Pinnock) Down in January 1643 when Ruthin's forces were forced to flee back through Liskeard and on to Saltash, while the Earl of Stamford withdrew from Launceston. Godolphin's regiment pursued Ruthin.

Hopton, after some futile negotiations, invested Plymouth again but not until after Godolphin's cousin the poet Sidney Godolphin died of a wound received in a skirmish at Chagford. The Cornish forces now left Devon and things remained quiet until the encounter battle of Polston Bridge, Launceston in April. Two days later there was another encounter battle, the "Western Wonder" of the Cavalier ballad, at Sourton Down, where in the middle of a violent thunderstorm, Chudleigh was able to hold the field and Hopton again retreated to Launceston. On 16 May the Cornish regiments attacked the forces on Stratton (now Stamford) Hill, Stratton. This produced their most spectacular victory when, after ten hours of fighting uphill against twice their number of much better equipped enemy with a dug-in battery, the Royalists gained the position, killing 300 and capturing 1,700 with fourteen guns, £300 and plentiful provisions, at a cost of 80 men.

The Cornish Royalist army then received orders to rendezvous with Prince Maurice's men, whom they met at Chard in Somerset in June. This combined force now took Taunton, Bridgwater, Dunster Castle and Wells. Their first contact with the Parliamentarian commander William Waller was a cavalry skirmish at Chewton Mendip. Waller was driven out of Monkton Farleigh on 3 July 1643 and on 5 July, two days later, the Royalists won a pyrrhic victory at the Battle of Lansdowne. Sir Bevill Grenvile fell at the battle. The foot were now besieged in Devizes but witnessed the destruction of Waller's forces at Roundway Down. The Western Royalists took Bath, and after joining Prince Rupert on 26 July 1643 they stormed Bristol. The Battle lasted over thirteen hours and at the end the Royalist had taken the City, but lost both Sir Nicholas Slanning and Sir John Trevanion. The Cornish returned to Devon, and unfer Prince Maurice, they took Exeter on 4 September and Dartmonth on 6 October, and arrived back near Plymouth for the winter. Godolphin was knighted at Oxford on 6 May 1644. Later in the year the Royalist captured and disbanded the parliamentary army of the Earl of Essex on 22 August 1644. In 1645 Godolphin's Regiment returned to Exeter to become one of the garrison units and was still there at the fall of the city on 9 April 1646. Godolphin was one of the signatories to the surrender.

Godolpin lived to see the Restoration of King Charles II. He died at Spargor, Cornwall in 1663 and was buried at St Mabyn on 27 November 1663.

== Family ==
Godolphin married firstly Ruth Lambe, daughter of Sir John Lambe of Coulston, and secondly Grace Barrett at Sutcombe, Devon on 25 March 1658. His son William by his first wife was an MP and diplomat, his daughter Ruth married Valentine Greatrakes. His brother John Godolphin was a lawyer and writer.

== Notes ==
Parliament of England
Vacant Parliament suspended since 1629	Member of Parliament for Helston; 1640 (April); With: Sidney Godolphin	Succeeded by Sidney Godolphin; Francis Godolphin
Vacant Parliament suspended since 1629	Member of Parliament for Cornwall; 1640 (April); With: Richard Buller	Succeeded by Sir Bevil Grenville; Alexander Carew
