= John Godolphin =

English jurist and writer

John Godolphin (1617–1678) was an English jurist and writer, and Judge of the High Court of Admiralty under the Commonwealth.

== Life ==
Godolphin arms, Gules, an eagle with two heads, displayed between three fleurs-de-lys, two and one, argent

The second son (by Judith Meredith) of John Godolphin, who was younger brother of Sir William Godolphin (died 1613), he was born on the Isles of Scilly, 29 November 1617. He became a commoner of Gloucester Hall, Oxford, in the Michaelmas term of 1632. There he studied philosophy, logic, and the civil law; he graduated as B.C.L. in 1636 and D.C.L. in 1643.

He took the Parliamentarian side, and on 30 July 1653 was appointed judge of the admiralty, with William Clerk and Charles George Cocke. After Clarke's death Godolphin and Cock were reappointed in July 1659 to hold the same office until 10 December. After the Restoration he became one of the king's advocates.

He died near Fleet Street, 4 April 1678, and was buried in Clerkenwell Church. He was four times married, and had by his first wife a son, Col. Sidney Godolphin (1652–1732) of Thames Ditton, Surrey, MP, Auditor of the Principality of Wales, Governor of the Scilly Isles, etc, who married Susanna Tanat, youngest daughter and co-heiress of Rees Tanat of Abertanat, Shropshire (per her monument in Llanyblodwel Church). Sidney's daughter Mary married Henry Godolphin, Dean of Saint Paul's Cathedral (her father's second cousin), as is stated on her mother's monument in Llanyblodwel Church.

== Works ==
Godolphin wrote the following books on law and divinity:

- The Holy Limbeck, or A Semicentury of Spiritual Extractions: Wherein the Spirit is Extracted from the Letter of Certain Eminent Places in the Holy Scripture, 1650. The Holy Limbec, or An Extraction of the Spirit from the Letter of Certain Eminent Places in the Holy Scripture is the same book with title altered.
- The Holy Arbor, Containing a Body of Divinity. […] Collected from many Orthodox Laborers in the Lord's Vineyard, 1651.
- Synēgoros Thalassios, a View of the Admiral Jurisdiction […], 1661 and 1685 (appendix has a list of lord high admirals after Henry Spelman, and an extract from the ancient laws of Oléron, translated from Garsias alias Ferrand).
- The Orphan's Legacy, or a Testamentary Abridgement (in three parts, on wills, executors, and legacies), 1674, 1677, 1685, 1701.
- Repertorium Canonicum, or an Abridgement of the Ecclesiastical Laws of this Realm Consistent with the Temporal, 1678, 1680, 1687.
