= Sidney Godolphin (colonel) =

English soldier and politician (1652–1732)

Colonel Sidney Godolphin MP, JP
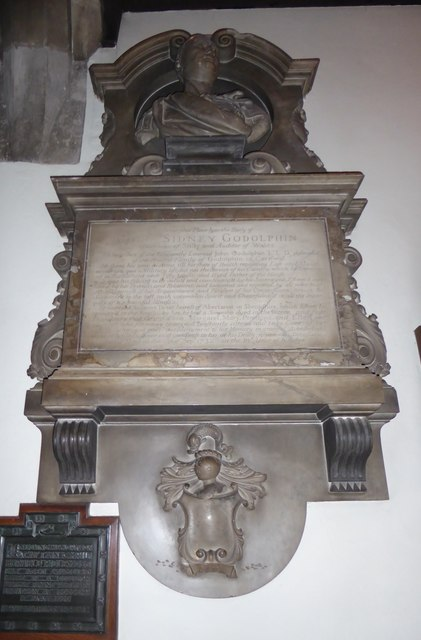
- Monument to Sidney Godolphin, Church of St Nicholas, Thames Ditton, erected by his youngest daughter Ellen

Member of Parliament for St Germans
- In office August 1727 – September 1732

Member of Parliament for St Mawes
- In office April 1722 – July 1727

Auditor of the Exchequer
- In office June 1702 – September 1732

Governor of Scilly
- In office April 1700 – September 1732

Member of Parliament for Helston
- In office August 1698 to September 1713 – September 1715 to February 1722

Member of Parliament for Penryn
- In office April 1690 – November 1695

Personal details
- Born: 12 January 1652 (baptised) London, England
- Died: 30 September 1732 (aged 80) Thames Ditton, England
- Resting place: Church of St Nicholas, Thames Ditton
- Spouse: Susanna Tanat (married 1673–1723)
- Relations: Earl of Godolphin (cousin)
- Children: Margaret, Tanat, Mary, Penelope, Elizabeth, Ellen
- Parent(s): John Godolphin (1617–1678); Mary Tregose
- Education: Inner Temple
- Occupation: Soldier and politician

Military service
- Allegiance: England
- Rank: Lieutenant Colonel
- Unit: Granville's Regiment of Foot
- Battles/wars: Glorious Revolution; Nine Years War; Siege of Namur

Lieutenant Colonel Sidney Godolphin (1652–1732) was an English soldier, politician and Member of Parliament for various seats between 1685 and 1732, becoming Father of the House in 1730. He also reached the rank of lieutenant colonel and was Governor of Scilly from 1700 until his death in September 1732.

== Personal details ==
Arms of Godolphin: Gules, an eagle with two heads displayed between three fleurs-de-lys two and one argent

Baptised on 12 January 1652 in London, Sidney Godolphin was the only surviving son of John Godolphin (1617–1678), an English jurist and author, and his second wife Mary Tregose, daughter of William Tregose of St Ives, Cornwall. His father married four times and had a total of eleven children, of whom only Sidney and two others survived childhood; his older half-brother Francis (1642-after 1679) and a half-sister Rebecca (1676-after 1699).

A member of one of the wealthiest families in Cornwall, John Godolphin supported Parliament in the Wars of the Three Kingdoms, unlike his Royalist cousins Sidney, killed in 1643, and Francis. During the Commonwealth, he served as Judge of the High Court of Admiralty, then as King's Advocate after the 1660 Stuart Restoration.

In 1673, Godolphin married Susanna Tanat (1650-1723), youngest daughter and co-heiress of Rees Tanat of Llanyblodwel in Shropshire. They had one son, Tanat (1675-1696), who died of fever while serving in Flanders, and four daughters, Mary (1676-1766), Margaret (1678-1743), Ellen (1680-1754) and Penelope (1682-after 1732).

== Career ==
Godolphin attended legal school at the Inner Temple in 1668 but little is known of his activities until June 1685, when he was commissioned captain in the Earl of Bath's regiment, raised by James II following the Monmouth Rebellion. In the 1685 English general election, he was returned as MP for the family-controlled seat of Helston, although Parliament was suspended by James in November.

In August 1688, his regiment was sent to garrison Plymouth, a key strategic port in the West Country; the Earl of Bath, who was governor of the town, defected to William of Orange after his landing at Torbay during the November 1688 Glorious Revolution. In early 1689, Godolphin and a detachment of the regiment secured Guernsey, where he served as lieutenant governor for the next year. In March 1690 he was elected MP for Penryn and in April appointed lieutenant-governor of the Isles of Scilly, which had been owned by his family since the late 16th century.

In addition to his duties as lieutenant-governor, he spent most of the next three years in Parliament, where he normally voted in favour of the government. In October 1693, Bevil Granville, then commanding the Earl of Bath's regiment in Flanders, became colonel and returned to London; in February 1694, Godolphin was promoted lieutenant colonel and went out to take his place. He served there for the next two years; during the operations around Namur in June 1695, he was captured by a French cavalry patrol.

How long he was held prisoner is unclear, but he missed the November 1695 election and resigned his commission in 1696, shortly before the 1697 Treaty of Ryswick. In August 1698, he was elected once again for Helston, a seat he retained without interruption until 1713. He replaced his cousin the Earl of Godolphin as Governor of Scilly in April 1700 and was commissioned as a major in the Queen's regiment, part of the military expansion caused by the imminent outbreak of the War of the Spanish Succession.

However, he resigned his commission in early 1702 due to poor health and in June was appointed Auditor of the Exchequer for Wales, where his wife owned property. He was generally viewed as a member of the Whig faction and in 1709 voted for the impeachment of High church minister and Tory favourite Henry Sacheverell. Although he held his seat in the 1710 Tory landslide that followed, he lost it when they made further gains in September 1713.

Following the succession of George I in August 1714, the Tories were swept from office, ushering a period of Whig dominance which lasted nearly 50 years. Godolphin regained his seat at Helston in March 1715, then switched to St Mawes in 1722, followed by St Germans in 1727. His long service meant he became Father of the House although he left little impact on the Parliamentary records.

In 1723, he bought a house in Thames Ditton, where he died on 22 September 1732 and buried in the Church of St Nicholas. It contains an elaborate monument installed by his daughter Ellen who inherited the bulk of his property. (Note: The inscription reads;"He spent his time in arms till his state of health, requiring ease and quiet, made him quit a military life, but not the service of his Country, which he represented in Parliament near fifty years, and died Father of the House. It was his felicity to be valued and countenanced by his Sovereign, esteemed and loved by his friends and relations...")

== Sources ==
- Cannon, Richard (1847). Historical record of the Tenth, or the North Lincolnshire Regiment containing an account of the formation of the regiment in 1685 and of its subsequent services to 1847. Parker, Furnivall and Parker.
- Childs, John (1986). The Army, James II and the Glorious Revolution. Manchester University Press. ISBN 0719006880.
- Cruickshanks, Eveline (2002). GODOLPHIN, Sidney (1652-1732), of Abertanat, Salop and Thames Ditton, Surr in The History of Parliament: the House of Commons 1690-1715 (Online ed.). Boydell & Brewer.
- Cruickshanks, Eveline (1970). GODOLPHIN, Sidney (1652-1732), of Thames Ditton, Surr in The History of Parliament: the House of Commons 1715-1754 (Online ed.). Boydell & Brewer.
- Dalton, Charles (1894). English army lists and commission registers, 1661-1714, Volume II. Eyre & Spottiswoode.
- Dalton, Charles (1896). English army lists and commission registers, 1661-1714, Volume IV. Eyre & Spottiswoode.
- Marsh, Frank G (1930). The Godolphins. New Milton.

Parliament of England
Preceded by Samuel Rolle; Alexander Pendarves	Member of Parliament for Penryn; 1690–1695; With: Alexander Pendarves	Succeeded by Alexander Pendarves; James Vernon
Preceded by Charles Godolphin; Francis Godolphin	Member of Parliament for Helston; 1698–1707; With: Charles Godolphin 1698–1701; Viscount Rialton 1701–1707	Succeeded by Parliament of Great Britain
Parliament of Great Britain
Preceded by Parliament of England	Member of Parliament for Helston; 1707–1713; With: Viscount Rialton 1707–1708; John Evelyn 1708–1710; George Granville 1710; Robert Child 1710–1713	Succeeded by Henry Campion; Charles Coxe
Preceded by Thomas Tonkin; Alexander Pendarves	Member of Parliament for Helston; 1715–1722; With: Sir Gilbert Heathcote	Succeeded by Sir Robert Raymond; Walter Carey
Preceded by William Lowndes; John Chetwynd	Member of Parliament for St Mawes; 1722–1727; With: Samuel Travers 1722–1726; Samuel Molyneux 1726–1727	Succeeded by Henry Vane; John Knight
Preceded by Lord Binning; Philip Cavendish	Member of Parliament for St Germans; 1727–1732; With: Sir Gilbert Heathcote	Succeeded by Sir Gilbert Heathcote; Richard Eliot
