= Elizabeth Godolphin =

English school founder and benefactor (1663–1726)

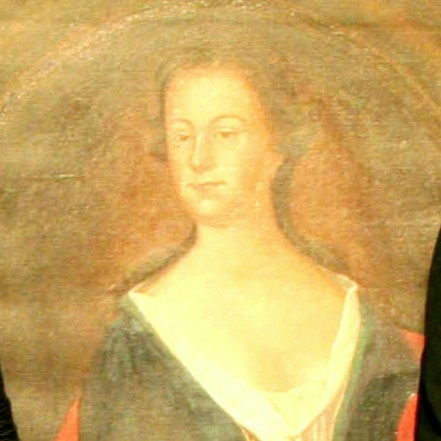
- portrait
- Born: Elizabeth Godolphin; 5 November 1663; Coulston Wiltshire
- Died: 29 July 1726 (aged 62)
- Resting place: Westminster Abbey
- Known for: founding Godolphin School
- Spouse: The Hon. Charles Godolphin
- Children: two (died young), adopted another
- Parent(s): Elizabeth and Francis Godolphin. Her guardian was Sir William Godolphin

Elizabeth Godolphin (born 5 November 1663 – 29 July 1726) was a British school founder and benefactor. She is buried in Westminster Abbey. Godolphin School, Salisbury, is named after her.

== Life ==
Her birth date is shown in the entry for Coulston in the Bishops Transcripts for (Coulston]], Wiltshire. Her parents were Elizabeth and Francis Godolphin. Her mother's father was John Gayer who had been a Lord Mayor of London. Her mother died in childbirth when she was about four and her father remarried but died when she was seven. He had built what became Baynton House in Coulston. Her uncle Sir William Godolphin became the guardian of her and her brother Francis. Their father had left them an annuity but the bulk of the estate went to his eldest child, William, who was Elizabeth's brother. The younger William died in a duel in 1682, and her brother inherited. When Francis took his own life in 1702, part of the inheritance passed to Elizabeth.

She married her cousin Charles Godolphin (c.1650–1720) in 1687; he was a Member of Parliament for Helston, Cornwall, and held government offices including (from 1691) a post as customs commissioner. The couple lived at St James's Street in Piccadilly. They adopted a relative, Frances (Fanny) Quicke, after their two children (a son and a daughter) died young.

Godolphin School was founded by her using her own money and some from the estate of her husband, the Hon. Charles Godolphin. She created the school originally for the education of eight young orphaned gentlewomen. According to the terms of her will, the students were to be daughters of members of the Church of England, between eight and twelve years of age, born in Salisbury or some other part of Wiltshire, and to have had "some portion left to them but not exceeding £400". The girls were to be taught to "dance, work, read, write, cast accounts and the business of housewifery". The new charity was initially to be administered by her nephew William Godolphin and his heirs; the Dean and Chapter declined to take on the task.

The school did not open its doors until 9 August 1784, when it was based in Rosemary Lane, in the Cathedral Close, Salisbury. In 1789 the school promised a regime of early rising, "agreeable exercise" and a diet of wholesome books "such as enlarge the heart to Virtue and excellency of Sentiment".

== Death and legacy ==
The school dates its foundation to 1726, the year of Godolphin's death. She was buried in Westminster Abbey, joining her husband and their children. The inscription records the terms of her will as set out above. Her husband died several years before this bequest was made.

Every other year, in November, Godolphin School commemorates its founder Elizabeth Godolphin when the Head Girl, accompanied by members of the Upper Sixth, lays a wreath on her tomb in the cloister of Westminster Abbey.

Godolphin School makes available substantial contributions to the fees of some students as part of its founder's legacy.
