= Baynton House =

English country house in Coulston, Wiltshire, England

Coordinates: 51.2839°N 2.0712°W

Baynton House is a Grade II listed 17th-century country house at Coulston, Wiltshire, England, about 5 miles (8 km) northeast of the town of Westbury.

== History ==
The house was begun by Francis Godolphin in about 1658; it was said to be worth £200. It was inherited by Elizabeth Godolphin who married her cousin, Charles Godolphin. She survived him and died in 1726 (making a bequest that in time would create the Godolphin School, Salisbury). Her heir was her nephew William. After the death in 1781 of William Godolphin it was bought by William Evelyn, who enlarged what had been previously a house 'of very small pretensions'.

William Long purchased the house in 1796, after his own manor house of Baynton in Edington had been destroyed by fire. He renamed it Baynton House and made alterations which included a new south wing. Parts of the rear of the house probably date from the first building of c.1658, and in the hall there is re-used panelling of the same era. Constructed of rendered brick, with a seven-bay east front, the house sits in parkland, with its own lake.

John Long of Monkton Farleigh (nephew of Richard Godolphin Long) inherited the property after the death of the widow of his cousin William Long in 1822, who had left it at her disposal. In 1830, 365 Roman coins known as the Baynton Hoard were dug up in the grounds, 101 of which are now kept in the Wiltshire Museum, Devizes. John Long sold the property in 1842, and it subsequently passed to Simon Watson Taylor of Erlestoke, from whose heirs it was bought by G. S. H. Pearson about 1915.

There was a walled kitchen garden some 3/4 mile (1.2 km) to the east, near the village of Erlestoke. The War Office bought the site in the 1930s, and in 1991 it became the home of Erlestoke and Coulston Cricket Club.

The house was occupied by R. H. Pearson, who wrote a book named after the house which was published in 1955, recording the lives of the Pearson family. He sold the house in 1964 for £25,000. The house was advertised for sale by public auction at the Red Lion, Salisbury, on 28 July 1966, with sixteen acres of grounds. It was reported to have three reception rooms, a panelled hall, long gallery, and study, six principal bedrooms, six secondary bedrooms, and eight bathrooms. Outside were an Italian garden, a lake, a paddock, an entrance lodge and two other cottages, a hard tennis court, and a squash court. The house was recorded as Grade II listed in 1968. The house is still a private residence.
