= Mary Douglas (disambiguation) =

Mary Douglas (1921–2007) was a British anthropologist.

Mary Douglas may also refer to:

- Mary Alice Douglas (1860–1941), English headmistress
- Mary Peacock Douglas (1903–1970), American librarian and author
- Mary Douglas, 6th Countess of Buchan, wife of James Erskine, 6th Earl of Buchan
- Mary Douglas Drysdale, American interior designer

== See also ==
- Lady Mary Victoria Douglas-Hamilton, Scottish noblewoman
