= William Godolphin (diplomat) =

English diplomat for Charles II and Member of Parliament

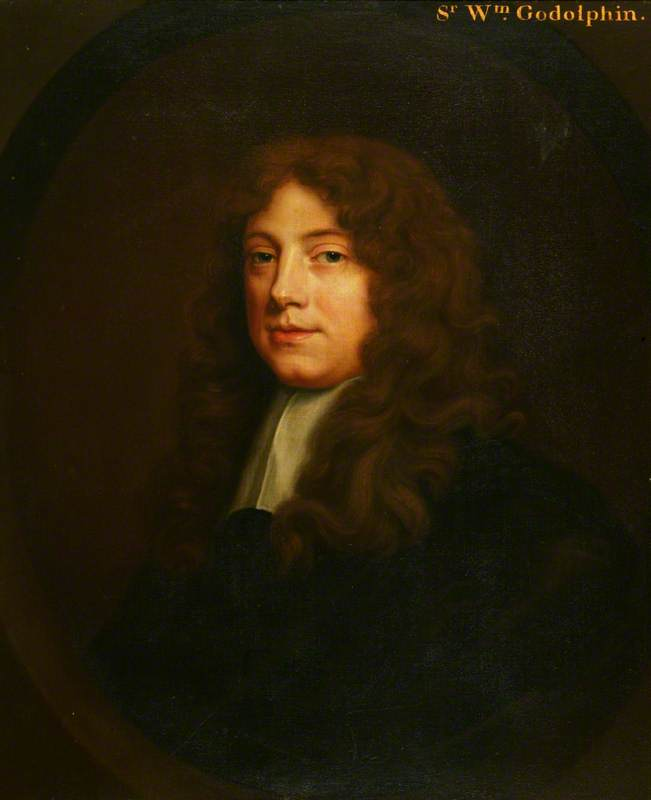
William Godolphin by Peter Lely

Sir William Godolphin (2 February 1635 – 11 July 1696) was an English diplomat for Charles II and Member of Parliament.

== Biography ==
Godolphin was third but eldest surviving son of Sir William Godolphin (1605–1663) of Spargor, Cornwall; the eldest son (by Judith Meredith) of John Godolphin (the younger brother of Sir William Godolphin (1567–1613)—and Ruth (died before 1658), daughter of Sir John Lambe of East Coulston, Wiltshire.

Godolphin was baptised 2 February 1634, and was educated at Westminster School and Christ Church, Oxford, gaining the degrees of Master of Arts in 1661 and Doctor of Civil Law in 1663. He became a follower of Lord Arlington,, an advisor to Charles II, and through that connection likely aided John Locke, Godophin's schoolmate from Westminster School and Christ Church College. Locke was appointed as secretary of Sir Walter Vane in 1665 on a diplomatic mission to the Elector of Brandenburg. On that mission, Locke observed firsthand religious toleration. In 1665 Godophin was elected in a by-election to Parliament as member for Camelford, but since he went to Spain early the next year he probably never took up his seat.

After 1662 he was exchanging letters with the correspondent and widow Martha, Lady Giffard. She had been a widow after her first marriage which only lasted for months. She was a Royalist involved with politics as she travelled with her brother living in Brussels in 1667 and later travelling with him to diplomatic meetings in Amsterdam and The Hague leading up to the Treaty of Aix-la-Chapelle. The treaty was signed in 1668 and she and Godolphin lost interest in writing to each other.

Godolphin's Estate Act 1697
- Act of Parliament
- Parliament of England
- Long title: An Act for confirming and establishing the Administration of the Goods and Chattels of Sir William Godolphin Knight, deceased.
- Citation: 9 Will. 3. c. 19 Pr.
- Territorial extent: England and Wales

Dates
- Royal assent: 2 April 1698
- Commencement: 3 December 1697 (Note: Start of session.)

Status: Current legislation

In 1667, he took part in the negotiations under Sandwich which resulted in a commercial treaty with Spain. He was knighted in 1668, and in 1669 was sent as Envoy Extraordinary to Madrid, becoming Ambassador in 1672. However, in 1678 he came under suspicion of having been converted to Catholicism, and was recalled; but rather than return to England, he then openly declared his Catholicism, and retired to Spain for the remaining two decades of his life. Shortly before he died, he made a declaration empowering his spiritual advisers, including the procurator-general of the Jesuits, to make his will after his death; an act of Parliament was passed in 1698, Godolphin's Estate Act 1697 (9 Will. 3. c. 19 Pr.), to declare this and other posthumous wills invalid and to make his nephew Francis and niece Elizabeth heirs on condition that £1,520 was devoted to charity, a charitable act leading ultimately to the foundation of Godolphin and Latymer School, Hammersmith, London and Godolphin School, Salisbury.

Samuel Pepys, who met him in 1668, called Godolphin "a very pretty and able person, a man of very fine parts".

== Portuguese relatives ==
He wrote from Madrid a letter dated 27 December 1683/5 to António Cabral da Cunha, Nobleman Knight of the Royal Household of Portugal, native of Lisbon, in which he called him cousin. This António Cabral da Cunha was son of António Cabral, born in São Miguel Island, Knight of the Habit of the Order of Saint James, Nobleman Knight of the Royal Household and Corporal of the Galleons of the State of India, and his second wife Maria da Cunha, daughter of João Cardoso and wife Maria Correia, paternal grandson of Francisco Bormans (portugueseised in Burmão), native and resident on the same island, and wife Margarida Rangel, daughter of Nuno Velho Cabral (distant nephew of Gonçalo Velho), and great-grandson of Lodewijk then Luís Dulfos Bormans, honoured and rich Flemish, who lived in São Miguel Island, where he married Margarida Sipiman, daughter of John then João Sipiman, English nobleman, and wife Marquesa Gonçalves Caiado, daughter of Francisco Dias Caiado, citizen of Porto, who, passing to Ponta Delgada, there was Judge and Councilman, and wife Teresa Gonçalves. António Cabral da Cunha, to whom the English ambassador at the Spanish court called cousin, was married to Bárbara Maria de Matos, sister of Father Salvador de Azevedo, Friar of the Convent of Palmela, daughter of Laurent de la Roche (in Portugal, Dom Lourenço de la Rocca), French nobleman, and wife Cecília de Almeida, native of Lisbon. It is not known of which line derives to this António Cabral da Cunha the kinship with the Godolphins, but it is natural that it is through their English Sipiman ancestors. The use in Portugal of the Godolfim or Goodolfim surname started with children of this António Cabral da Cunha. The arms the Godolfim family brings, as much in England as in Portugal, are: gules, a spread double-headed eagle argent, accompanied of three fleurs-de-lis red; crest: a swimming dolphin proper.

== Bibliography ==
- Cruickshanks, Eveline (1983). "GODOLPHIN, William (1635-96), of Spargor, St. Mabyn, Cornw.". In Henning, Basil Duke (ed.). The History of Parliament: the House of Commons 1660-1690. Secker & Warburg.
- Leslie, Stephen (1890). "Godolphin, William" . In Stephen, Leslie; Lee, Sidney (eds.). Dictionary of National Biography. Vol. 22. London: Smith, Elder & Co. pp. 46–47.
- Venning, Timothy (October 2008) [2004]. "Godolphin, Sir William (bap. 1635, d. 1696)". Oxford Dictionary of National Biography (online ed.). Oxford University Press. doi:10.1093/ref:odnb/10883. (Subscription, Wikipedia Library access or UK public library membership required.)

Parliament of England
Preceded by Hon. Thomas Coventry; Charles Roscarrock	Member of Parliament for Camelford; 1665–1679; With: Hon. Thomas Coventry	Succeeded by Sir James Smyth; William Harbord
