= Sir Vyell Vyvyan, 2nd Baronet =

English politician from Cornwall (1639–1697)

Sir Vyell Vyvyan, 2nd Baronet (May 1639 – 24 February 1697) was an English politician.

== Biography ==
Vyvyan was the eldest son of Sir Richard Vyvyan, 1st Baronet and Mary Bulteel. He was educated at St John's College, Oxford. In 1663 he was appointed a Commissioner for Assessment in Cornwall.

Vyvyan succeeded to his father's title and estate in 1665, at which point he also became governor of St Mawes Castle. On 19 December 1665 he contested a by-election for the St Mawes constituency, but the double return saw Joseph Tredenham taking the seat. In 1666 he was made a justice of the peace and in 1670 he was appointed a deputy lieutenant for Cornwall. In 1678, he sold his sinecure interest in St Mawes Castle to John Granville, 1st Earl of Bath, who promptly transferred it to Vyvyan's rival, Tredenham.

In early 1679, Vyvyan was returned as a Member of Parliament for Helston, likely on the interest of Sidney Godolphin. In the Commons, he voted against the Exclusion Bill and was classed as "doubtful" by Anthony Ashley Cooper, 1st Earl of Shaftesbury. In the Habeas Corpus Parliament, he was appointed to three committees. In the summer of 1769 he was re-elected for Helston and served in the Exclusion Bill Parliament, but did not attend any committees and gave way to Charles Godolphin in 1681. He served as High Sheriff of Cornwall in 1681–2.

In the summer of 1688, he was removed from all of his local offices in Cornwall for opposing the Declaration of Indulgence issued by James II. During the Glorious Revolution, in November 1688 Vyvyan was quick to follow the Earl of Bath in defecting to William III. He died on 24 February 1697 and was buried at Mawgan-in-Meneage.

Vyvyan had married Jane Melhuish on 24 February 1684. Together they had one son, who died before Vyvyan. As such, Vyvyan was succeeded in his titles by his nephew, Richard Vyvyan, who was also a politician and a prominent Cornish Jacobite.

Parliament of England
Preceded by Sir William Godolphin, Bt; Sidney Godolphin	Member of Parliament for Helston with Sir William Godolphin, Bt (1679); Sidney Godolphin (1679–1681); 1685–1687	Succeeded by Sidney Godolphin; Charles Godolphin
Baronetage of England
Preceded by Richard Vyvyan	Baronet (of Trelowarren); 1665–1697	Succeeded by Richard Vyvyan
