= Anna Pauffley =

British judge

Dame Anna Pauffley DBE
- Royal coat of arms of the United Kingdom

Justice of the High Court
- In office 2003–2017

Personal details
- Born: 13 January 1956 (age 70)
- Education: University of London

Dame Anna Evelyn Hamilton Pauffley DBE (born 13 January 1956), styled The Hon. Mrs Justice Pauffley, was a judge of the High Court of England and Wales. until her retirement on 1 October 2017.

She was educated at Godolphin School and the University of London.

She was called to the bar at Middle Temple in 1979. In 2003, she was appointed a judge of the High Court of Justice (Family Division). She retired from the bench in October 2017.

== Controversies ==
=== Accommodating child abuse ===
On 11 June 2015, Pauffley was highly criticised by ministers and child protection campaigners for stating that it was 'okay for migrant families to hit children', suggesting that migrants could hit children because of so-called 'culture context', in response a government spokesman stated that there should never be any exceptions regarding child abuse.
