= The Orphan's Legacy =

Legal treatise by John Godolphin

The Orphan's Legacy: or, a Testamentary Abridgement
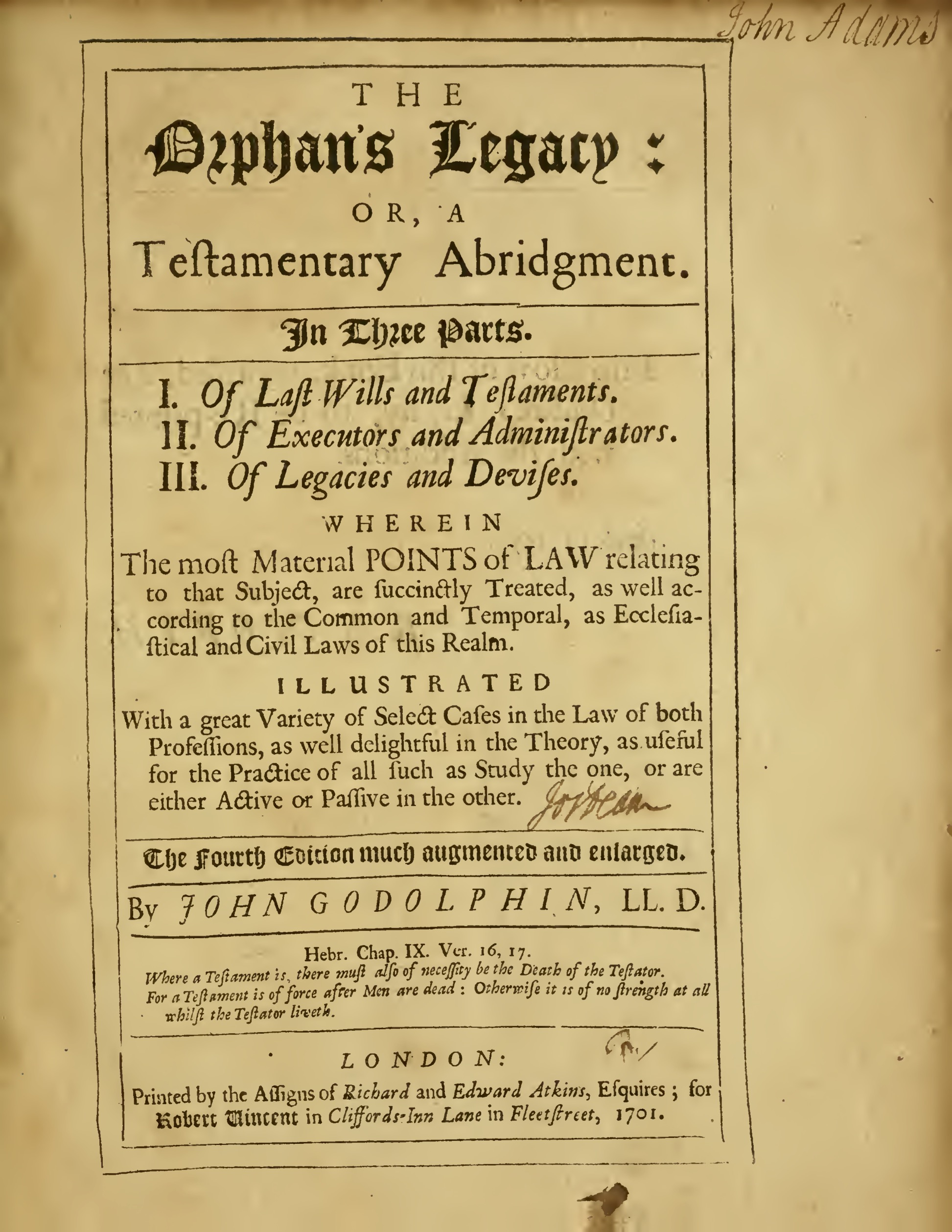
- Title Page of 4th ed. (1701)
- Author: John Godolphin
- Language: English
- Published: 1701
- Publication place: England
- Pages: 478

The Orphan's Legacy: or, a Testamentary Abridgement is a treatise on the law of inheritance by English jurist and writer John Godolphin. It was published in four editions between 1674 and 1701.

The book was an important source of legal knowledge for courts and scholars in 17th and 18th century England. Sir William Blackstone, in his Commentaries on the Laws of England drew heavily on them for his scholarship on testamentary law and administration. It also informed legal decisions in the pre-revolution American colonies.

In 1694 the founder of Pennsylvania, William Penn, recommended the first edition in a letter to his friend, Quaker dissident John Rodes.

In modern times it has been used by courts and scholars as evidence of the historical English law of wills and inheritance. For example, in a 1911 case involving the killing of actress Cora Crippen the book was cited for the "old law" that a killer could not inherit from his victim.
