= Sheila Callender =

Sheila Callender FRCP
- Dr Callender
- Born: 5 April 1914; Sidcup, Kent, England
- Died: 17 August 2004 (aged 90); Oxford, Oxfordshire, England
- Citizenship: United Kingdom
- Education: Godolphin School
- Alma mater: University of St Andrews
- Spouse: Ivan Gyula Árpád Monostori (m. 1957)
- Scientific career
- Fields: Haematology
- Institutions: Dundee Royal Infirmary; University of Oxford

Sheila Theodora Elsie Callender (5 April 1914 – 17 August 2004) was a British physician and haematologist. She spent the majority of her career at Oxford University, and has been credited with helping to establish haematology as a distinct medical discipline.

== Early life and education ==
Callender was born on 5 April 1914 in Sidcup, Kent, to Thomas Marshall Callender, a general practitioner, and Charlotte Elizabeth Marie Rose (née Hoysted). Her mother and father were of Irish and Scottish descent respectively. She attended secondary school at the Godolphin School in Salisbury. She attended the University of St Andrews from 1932, earning a BSc in 1935 and an MBChB in 1938. Upon her latter graduation, she received a gold medal recognising her as the best student of her year. She graduated with an MD in 1944 for her research on anaemia during pregnancy.

== Career ==
Callender began her career as a junior doctor at Dundee Royal Infirmary. In 1940, she was appointed to the Scottish Blood Transfusion Service as an assistant in pathology and medical officer. She worked at Oxford University from 1942 to 1946 as a house officer and research assistant. In 1946, she received a fellowship from the Rockefeller Foundation to conduct research in haematology in St. Louis, Missouri, until 1948. Upon her return to the United Kingdom, she was appointed reader and later a consultant physician at Oxford's Nuffield Department of Clinical Medicine, where she spent the rest of her career. She was made a Fellow of the Royal College of Physicians in 1962 and awarded a DSc by Oxford University in 1970. She has been recognised as one of a group of physicians in the United Kingdom and North America who helped to establish haematology as a distinct discipline of medicine.

Callender's contributions to haematology included research on iron absorption and the effects and management of iron overload. She studied some of the most common causes of anaemia: iron deficiency, vitamin B12 deficiency, and folate deficiency. She also worked with Rob Race to develop a new method for determining the lifespan of red blood cells, and helped Leslie Witts on early studies of chemotherapy regimens for treating leukaemia. She and her colleagues at Oxford designed one of the first whole-body counters to measure radioactivity within the body.

== Personal life ==
Callender married Ivan Gyula Árpád Monostori, a Hungarian refugee studying medicine at Oxford, in 1957; they lived together in Oxford and Scotland with "a collection of rather terrifying mastiffs". Callender died from leukaemia on 17 August 2004 at John Radcliffe Hospital in Oxford.
