= Francis Godolphin (died 1652) =

English Member of Parliament

Godolphin arms, Gules, an eagle with two heads, displayed between three fleurs-de-lys, two and one, argent

Francis Godolphin of Treveneage in Cornwall (died 1652) was an English Member of Parliament. The son of Sir William Godolphin of Treveneage, he represented St Ives in the Parliament of 1628–29 and again in the Long Parliament. Unlike his relatives in the senior branch of the Godolphin family, he supported the Parliamentary cause on the outbreak of the Civil War, and continued to sit through most of the 1640s; however, there is no record of his having taken any part in proceedings after Pride's Purge. (He should not be confused with his namesake and cousin once removed, Francis Godolphin of Godolphin, who was also a member of the Long Parliament but was ejected as a Royalist in 1644.)

Godolphin married Ann Carew in 1616, and they had three children:

- Francis Godolphin of Crowan
- Catherine Godolphin, who married John St Aubyn of Clowance
- Loveday Godolphin

He died in 1652, and was buried on 4 February 1652 at Crowan.

Parliament of England
Preceded by Edward Savage; William Noy	Member of Parliament for St Ives; 1628–1629; With: John Payne	Succeeded by William Dell; Sir Henry Marten
Preceded by William Dell; Sir Henry Marten	Member of Parliament for St Ives; 1640–1648; With: Lord Lisle 1640; Edmund Waller 1641–1644; John Feilder 1647–1648	Succeeded by Not represented in Rump Parliament
