= Thomas Blagge =

17th-century English Cavalier and member of the Royal household

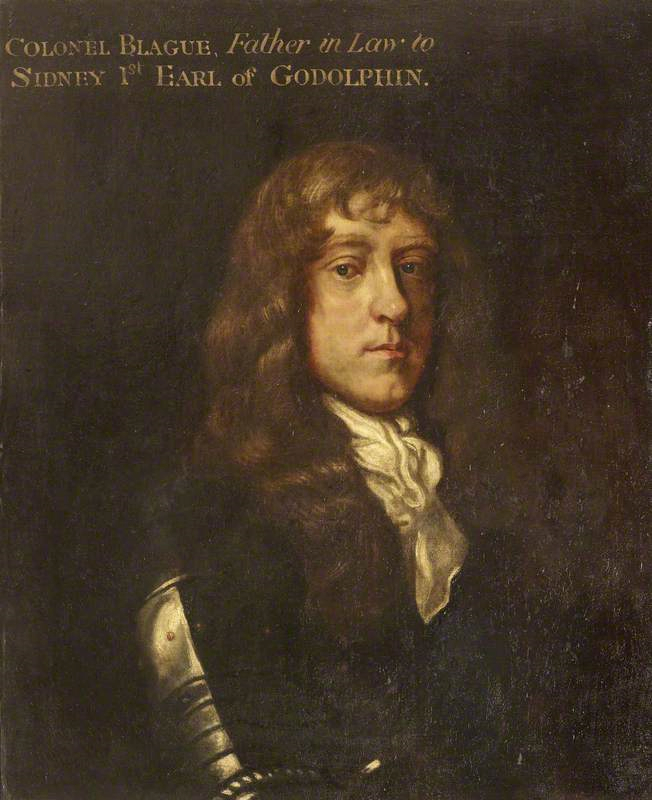
- Colonel Thomas Blagge

Governor of Great Yarmouth and Landguard Fort
- In office May 1660 – November 1660

Groom of the Chamber to Charles I and Charles II
- In office 1635–1660

Governor of Wallingford Castle
- In office February 1643 – July 1646

Personal details
- Born: 13 July 1613 (baptised) Little Horringer Hall, Suffolk
- Died: 4 November 1660 (aged 47) London
- Resting place: Westminster Abbey
- Spouse: Mary North (1641–1660; his death)
- Children: Henrietta Maria; Dorothy; Mary; Margaret
- Occupation: Soldier and member of the Royal Household

Military service
- Rank: Colonel
- Battles/wars: Wars of the Three Kingdoms; Edgehill; First Newbury; Cropredy Bridge; Lostwithiel; Second Newbury; Naseby; Siege of Wallingford Castle; Worcester; Franco-Spanish War; The Dunes

Colonel Thomas Blagge (13 July 1613 – 4 November 1660) served as Groom of the Chamber to Charles I and his son Charles II. He fought for the Royalists during the Wars of the Three Kingdoms, and following the Execution of Charles I in January 1649, joined the exiled Stuart court in France. He helped Charles II evade capture after defeat at Worcester in 1651, and although arrested himself, escaped from the Tower of London. He remained in exile for the next decade, fighting in the Franco-Spanish War during the brief Royalist alliance with Spain.

Born at Little Horringer Hall, Blagge was part of the Suffolk county gentry, connections which led to an appointment as a close personal servant to the king. When the First English Civil War began in August 1642, he quickly became a trusted and reliable Royalist brigade commander, and as governor of Wallingford Castle was one of the last to surrender in July 1646. He returned to England following the May 1660 Stuart Restoration and received a number of offices before dying in November 1660. Despite his early death, his loyalty was not forgotten and two of his daughters were appointed Maid of honour to the Duchess of York.

== Personal details ==
Thomas Blagge was baptised in Horningsheath, Suffolk on 13 July 1613, second surviving son of Ambrose Blagge (ca 1580–1662) and his first wife Martha (1588-1624). Six of their children lived to adulthood including Thomas, an older brother George (1611-1631), and four younger sisters, Martha, Katherine, Ann and Judith (1620-1707).

Ambrose Blagge owned Little Horringer Hall near Bury St Edmunds and was part of a wealthy and well connected circle of Suffolk gentry; his father Henry (1549-1596) had been MP for Sudbury. In 1625, he married secondly to Margaret Snelling, widowed mother of the painter Matthew Snelling. From this marriage, Thomas had a half brother and sister, Ambrose (1626-1664) and Margaret (1635-1720), while three others died as infants.

In 1641, Thomas married Mary North (died 1671), daughter of Sir Roger North (1577-1651), MP for Eye in Suffolk. They had three daughters who lived to adulthood, Henrietta Maria, who had 15 children with her husband Sir Thomas Yarborough (1637-1708), Mary and Margaret (1652-1678). In 1675, the latter married Sidney Godolphin, 1st Earl of Godolphin, then Groom of the Chamber to Charles II, who became one of the most powerful politicians of the late 17th and early 18th century.

== Career ==
Blagge's England; key locations. Note River Thames (blue line), London-Wallingford-Oxford

His family background placed Blagge firmly in the ranks of the middle to upper class county gentry, connections which resulted in an appointment as Groom of the Chamber to Charles I. During the political struggles of the early 1640s, most of Suffolk and East Anglia supported Parliament, including his father and father-in-law. However, like other Royal officials Blagge remained loyal to his master when the First English Civil War began in August 1642.

He raised a regiment for the Royalists, participating in the indecisive Battle of Edgehill in October 1642 and subsequent attack on London. After it failed, the main Royalist field army was divided between their wartime capital at Oxford, Abingdon and Wallingford. Blagge was appointed Governor of Wallingford Castle, a Royal possession that controlled a vital crossing point over the River Thames, but whose fortifications had been allowed to decay over the last 50 years.

Although present at the First Battle of Newbury in September, Blagge's priority was rebuilding Wallingford's defences, a process completed by the end of the year. During the 1644 Royalist offensive in South West England, he commanded a brigade at Cropredy Bridge, Lostwithiel and Second Newbury. Although Lostwithiel was a major victory, Charles had ignored advice from his nephew Prince Rupert, who cautioned the absence of the field army left Royalist garrisons around Oxford dangerously exposed (see Map). He was proved correct when the Parliamentarians captured Abingdon in July 1644, threatening the entire Royalist position in the Thames Valley. Coupled with the loss of Reading in 1643, retaining Wallingford became absolutely vital.

Most of the Oxford army was destroyed at Naseby in June 1645; Charles surrendered to the Scots Covenanters outside Newark-on-Trent in May 1646, followed by the Oxford garrison on 25 June. Besieged by the New Model Army under Sir Thomas Fairfax, Blagge did not capitulate until 27 July when his men were starving and close to mutiny, although the stubborn defence meant he secured good terms. Following the Execution of Charles I in January 1649, he joined Charles II in France, then accompanied him to Scotland in 1651.

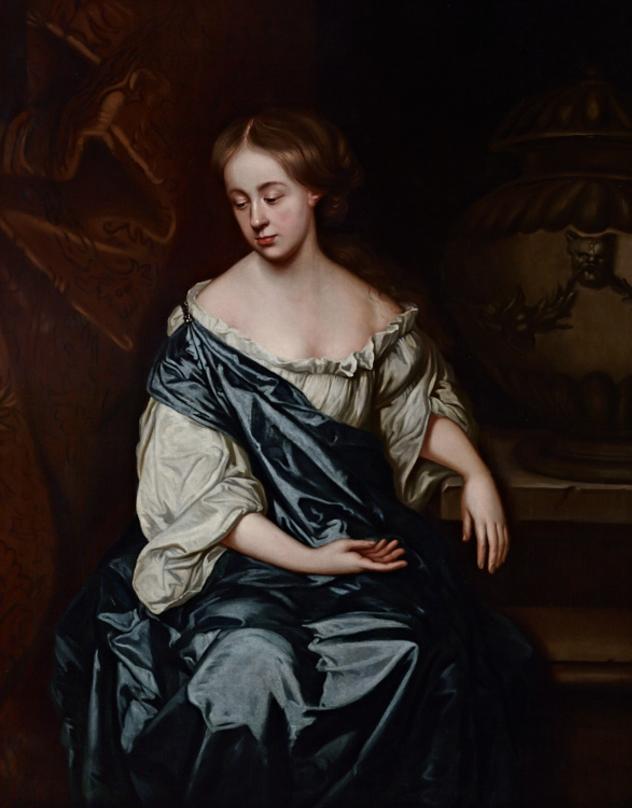
Blagge's youngest daughter Margaret (1652-1678)

When the Royalists were defeated at Worcester in September, he helped Charles evade capture; although arrested himself, he managed to escape from the Tower of London and rejoin the court. He was appointed Groom of the Chamber and his wife Mary governess to Princess Henrietta, making them part of a close knit inner circle of royal servants. During the short-lived 1658 alliance between Charles and Spain, Blagge and other exiles served in the army defeated by an Anglo-French army at The Dunes in June.

After the Stuart Restoration in May 1660, he was rewarded for his loyal service by being appointed Governor of Great Yarmouth and Landguard Fort. However, he died six months later and was buried in Westminster Abbey; the monument was replaced in 1757 with one commemorating Admiral Edward Vernon.

Blagge's early death left his widow three young daughters and large debts which she settled only just before her own death in 1671. Despite this, she managed to have both Mary and Margaret appointed Maid of honour to the Duchess of York and all three of her girls married well. Margaret was greatly admired by the diarist John Evelyn, who wrote a short biography after she died in childbirth in 1678.

== Sources ==
- Ditchfield, PH; Page, William (1923). A History of the County of Berkshire: Volume 3. Victoria County History.
- Edmond, Mary (1987). "Bury St Edmunds; A 17th century art centre". The Volume of the Walpole Society. 53. JSTOR 42581373.
- Evelyn, John (1907). The Life of Margaret Godolphin. Chatto and Windus.
- Hervey, Sydenham Henry Augustus (1900). Biographical note 290 in Horringer parish registers. Baptisms, marriages, and burials, with appendixes and biographical notes. G Booth.
- JH (1981). BLAGGE, Henry (c.1549-96), of Little Horningsheath, Suff. in The History of Parliament: the House of Commons 1558-1603. Boydell & Brewer.
- Newman, P. R. (1998). Atlas of the English Civil War. Routledge. ISBN 978-0-415-19610-9.
- Plant. "Colonel Thomas Blagge's Regiment of Foot". BCW Project. Archived from the original on 18 April 2021.
- Royle, Trevor (2004). Civil War: The Wars of the Three Kingdoms 1638–1660 (2006 ed.). Abacus. ISBN 978-0-349-11564-1.
- Sundstrom, Roy A (2011). "Godolphin, Sidney, first earl of Godolphin(1645–1712)". Oxford Dictionary of National Biography (online ed.). Oxford University Press. doi:10.1093/ref:odnb/10822. (Subscription, Wikipedia Library access or UK public library membership required.)
- Wallingford Castle. "Thomas Blagge". Earl Rivers Regiment of Foote.
- Westminster Abbey. "Thomas Blagge soldier". Westminster Abbey.
- Young, Peter (1939). "King Charles I's army of 1643-1645". Journal of the Society for Army Historical Research. 18 (69): 27–37. JSTOR 44219782.
