= John Penrose (Parliamentarian) =

English politician

John Penrose (born 1611) was an English politician who sat in the House of Commons from 1646 to 1648.

Penrose was the son of John Penrose of Helston and his wife Jane Trefusis. In 1645, Penrose was elected Member of Parliament for Helston in the Long Parliament. In 1647 he was a commissioner for raising money in Cornwall. In December 1648 he was one of the commissioners for settling militia throughout England and Wales. He is not recorded as sitting in the Rump Parliament after Pride's Purge.

Penrose married Amy Buggs and had four daughters and a son.

Parliament of England
Preceded by Sidney Godolphin; Francis Godolphin	Member of Parliament for Helston; 1646–1653; With: John Thomas	Succeeded by Not represented in the Barebones Parliament
