= Margaret Godolphin =

British courtier (1652–1678)

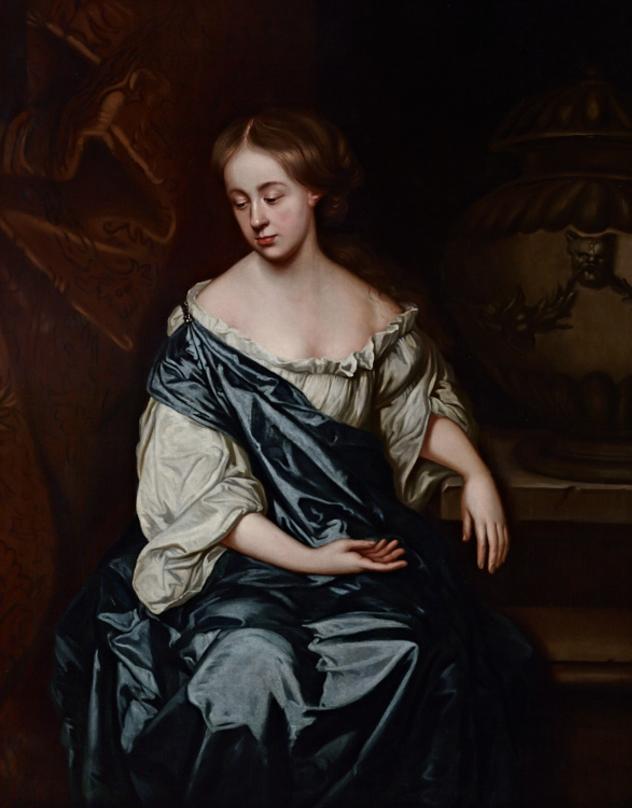
- Margaret Godolphin by Matthew Dixon, 1673
- Born: Margaret Blagge; 2 August 1652
- Died: 9 September 1678 (aged 26); Whitehall, London, England
- Burial place: Breage Parish Church, Cornwall
- Spouse: Sidney Godolphin, 1st Earl of Godolphin (m. 1676)
- Children: Francis Godolphin, 2nd Earl of Godolphin
- Parent: Thomas Blagge

Margaret Godolphin (née Blagge; 2 August 1652 – 9 September 1678) was an English courtier. She chose John Evelyn as a mentor and died after childbirth. His account of her life was not published until 1847.

== Life ==
Margaret Blagge was probably born in London on 2 August 1652, to the Royalist Colonel Thomas Blagge and his wife. Coming from an established, but not affluent, gentry background, the Blagges maintained strong connections with the exiled English court. Margaret served in the household of the Queen Mother, Henrietta Maria, and accompanied her back to England at the Restoration. Thomas Blagge died in 1660, leaving the family with significant financial difficulties.

In about 1666 she took on the role of Maid of Honour to Anne Hyde, the Duchess of York. Her elder sister had previously held a position in the Duchess's household, where she was quickly married. When the duchess died in 1671 she was employed in the same role by the Queen, Catherine of Braganza. As a maid of honour, Margaret was responsible for entertaining the Queen, and "adorning the Court". She lived at Whitehall with other young, unmarried women from noble families. Maids of honour received a small salary of £20 annually in addition to accommodation, but were expected to provide their own clothing. They also received, upon leaving royal service, a dowry paid by the Treasury. While typically maids of honour would marry and retire from service after employment lasting one to two years, Margaret held her post for ten years.

=== Platonic friendship ===
She chose John Evelyn as a mentor and "spiritual father" in 1672, though the pair first met in 1669, when she approached him to assist with her financial affairs. Margaret was twenty and Evelyn was 52; he advised her on religious learning and worship. Evelyn would write a book about her life. Compared to other maids of honour and courtiers at the time, Margaret was exceptionally devout, which became a continuous joke amongst the courtiers.

=== Marriage ===
She married Sidney Godolphin on 16 May 1676 in a private religious ceremony. Initially, the pair kept their marriage a secret from the court and their families. Mary remained in royal service and retained her maiden name. Godolphin would later become one of the most important politicians in England. Mary gave birth to Francis Godolphin on 3 September 1678, and due to complications resulting from the birth, she died in Whitehall on 9 September, and was transported to her husband's family estate in Cornwall for burial.

== Legacy ==
Godolphin was buried at Breage Parish Church in Cornwall some days later. John Evelyn wrote an account of her life in manuscript form; this was passed down through his family to Edward Venables-Vernon-Harcourt, who was the Archbishop of York. He arranged for it to be published in 1847, with the assistance of the Bishop of Oxford.
