= Sidney Godolphin, 1st Earl of Godolphin =

British statesman (1645–1712)

The Right Honourable The Earl of Godolphin KG PC
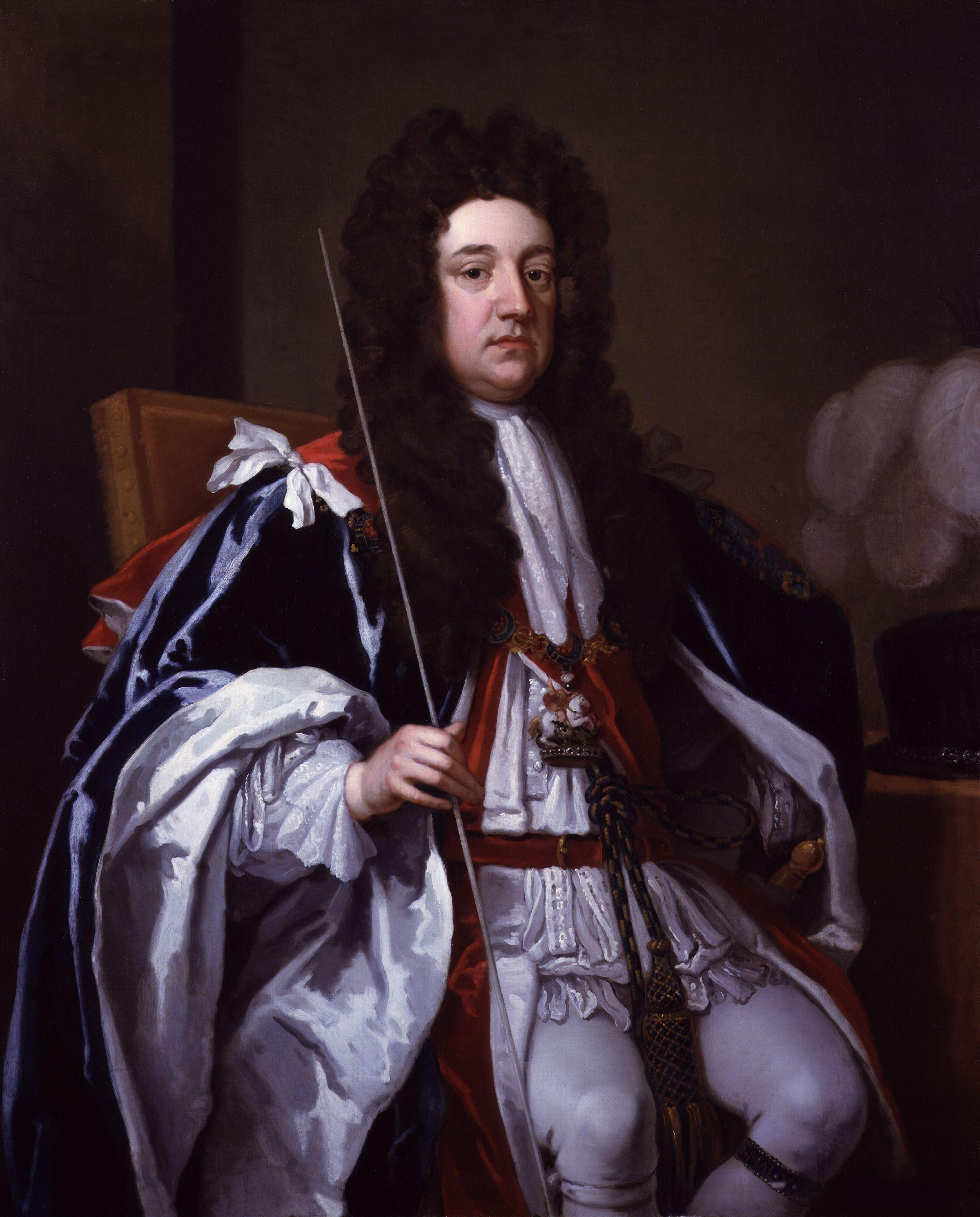
- Portrait by Godfrey Kneller, c. 1705–1707

Lord High Treasurer
- In office 8 May 1702 – 11 August 1710
- Monarch: Anne
- Preceded by: The Earl of Carlisle as First Lord of the Treasury
- Succeeded by: The Earl Poulett as First Lord of the Treasury

First Lord of the Treasury
- In office 9 December 1700 – 30 December 1701
- Monarch: William III
- Preceded by: The Earl Tankerville
- Succeeded by: The Earl of Carlisle
- In office 15 November 1690 – 1 May 1697
- Monarchs: William III and Mary II
- Preceded by: Sir John Lowther
- Succeeded by: Charles Montagu
- In office 9 September 1684 – 16 February 1685
- Monarchs: Charles II; James II
- Preceded by: The Earl of Rochester
- Succeeded by: The Earl of Rochester as Lord High Treasurer

Secretary of State for the Northern Department
- In office 17 April 1684 – 24 August 1684
- Monarch: Charles II
- Preceded by: The Earl of Sunderland
- Succeeded by: The Earl of Middleton

Member of Parliament for Helston
- In office September 1679 – 1685 Serving with Sir Vyell Vyvyan (1679–1681); Serving with Charles Godolphin (1681–1685)
- Preceded by: Sir William Godolphin
- Succeeded by: Sidney Godolphin
- In office 1665 – February 1679 Serving with Sir William Godolphin
- Preceded by: Sir Peter Killigrew
- Succeeded by: Sir Vyell Vyvyan

Personal details
- Born: Sidney Godolphin; 15 June 1645 Breage, Cornwall, Kingdom of England
- Died: 15 September 1712 (aged 67) St Albans, Hertfordshire, England, Kingdom of Great Britain
- Party: Tory
- Spouse: Margaret Blagge
- Children: Francis Godolphin
- Parent(s): Sir Francis Godolphin (1605–1667); Dorothy Berkeley

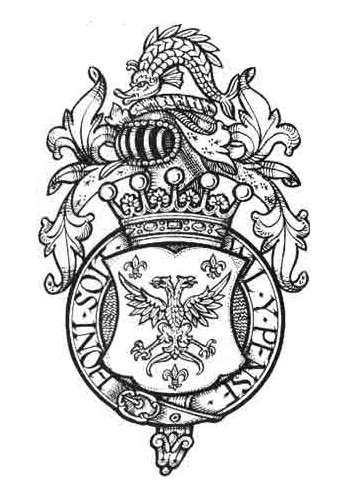
Arms of Sir Sidney Godolphin, KG: An eagle displayed with two heads between three fleurs-de-lis, circumscribed by the Garter, with canting crest: a dolphin embowed

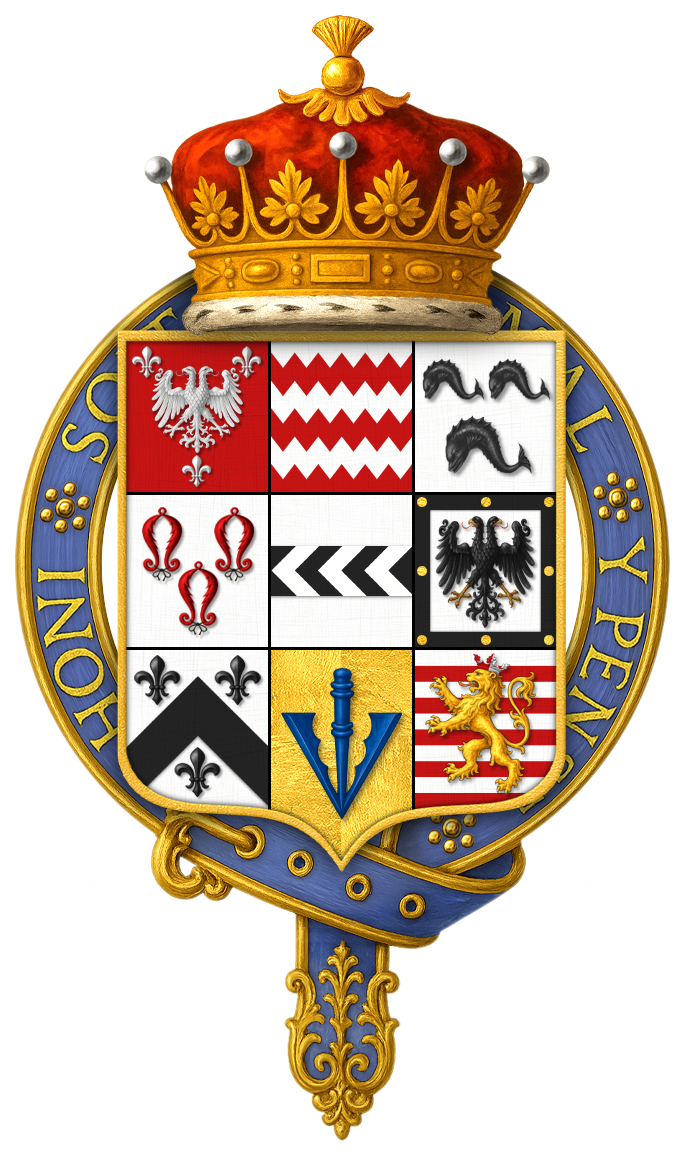
Quartered arms of Sidney Godolphin, 1st Earl of Godolphin, KG, as displayed on his Garter stall plate in St. George's chapel.

Sidney Godolphin, 1st Earl of Godolphin, KG, PC (15 June 1645 – 15 September 1712) was a British Tory statesman. He was a Privy Councillor and Secretary of State for the Northern Department before he attained real power as First Lord of the Treasury. He was instrumental in negotiating and passing the Acts of Union 1707 with Scotland, which created the Kingdom of Great Britain. He had many other roles, including that of Governor of Scilly.

== Family and early career ==
Godolphin arms, Gules, an eagle with two heads, displayed between three fleurs-de-lys, two and one, argent

He came from an ancient Cornish family as the son of Sir Francis Godolphin (1605–1667) and nephew of the poet Sidney Godolphin. At the Restoration, he was introduced into the royal household by King Charles II of England, whose favourite he had become, and he also entered the House of Commons as member for Helston, in Cornwall. Although he spoke few words before the House, they were so to the point that he "gradually acquired a reputation as its chief if not its only financial authority". In 1668, he was a successful intermediary between the King and his sister Henrietta Anne, the wife of the Duke of Orléans, to secure an agreement with King Louis XIV of France to reject England's Dutch allies in return for French money. In 1669, he was awarded a 31-year lease on all tin mines in Rialton and Retraigh in Cornwall. In 1670, Godolphin was appointed Groom of the Bedchamber along with a pension of £500 per annum. He held that post until 1678. The King said that he valued Godolphin because he was "never in the way and never out of the way".

Charles appointed Godolphin envoy-extraordinary to Louis XIV in 1672 to reassure France of Charles's allegiance before Louis attacked the Dutch. Godolphin was with Louis in the field during the Franco-Dutch War but was unimpressed with his capabilities as a military commander.

In March 1679, Godolphin was appointed a member of the Privy Council and in September was promoted, along with Viscount Hyde (afterwards Earl of Rochester) and the Earl of Sunderland, to the chief management of affairs.

== Exclusion and revolution ==
Although he voted for the Exclusion Bill in 1680, which, if successfully enacted, would have prevented the Catholic Duke of York from assuming the throne, Godolphin continued in office after the dismissal of Sunderland, and in September 1684, he was created Baron Godolphin of Rialton and succeeded Rochester as First Lord of the Treasury. After the accession of James II, he was made chamberlain to the queen, Mary of Modena, and, along with Rochester and Sunderland, enjoyed the king's special confidence. In 1687 he was named commissioner of the treasury. Although Parliament had voted to grant James II £6,000,000, Godolphin was involved in the payment of approximately £125,000 to James II by Louis XIV in return for James's support for Louis. The historian David Ogg wrote critically that "James and his two ministers, Rochester and Godolphin, were prepared to barter the independence of England for a sum little more than a sixtieth part of that granted by the national legislature". However, secret subsidies had also been paid to Charles II in the past, and according to Antonia Fraser, their acceptance was not "the national scandal it would be today". While the purpose of such funds was clearly to circumvent the control of Parliament over the monarch, "Whig leaders [...] allowed themselves to receive similar payments" from Louis XIV.

Godolphin was present at the birth of the Old Pretender, but during the ensuing controversy over whether or not the birth was genuine, he diplomatically stated that he had no useful information to contribute, as he claimed to have been too far from the bed to see anything. He was one of the council of five appointed by James II to represent him in London when James left the capital to lead his army after William of Orange and his forces invaded England. Afterwards, he was appointed a commissioner to negotiate with the prince, along with Lord Halifax and Lord Nottingham. On the accession of William III, Godolphin obtained only the third seat at the treasury board, but was still in control of affairs. He retired in March 1690, but was recalled in November and appointed First Lord of the Treasury once again.

== Career under William III and Queen Anne ==
While holding office under William III, for several years Godolphin continued, in conjunction with John Churchill (the future Duke of Marlborough), a secret correspondence with James II, and is said to have disclosed to James intelligence regarding the intended expedition against Brest during the Nine Years War. Godolphin was a Tory by inheritance, and was thought to have a romantic admiration for the wife of James II. After Fenwick's confession in 1696 regarding the attempted assassination of William III, Godolphin, who was compromised, tendered his resignation, but when the Tories came into power in 1700, he was again appointed First Lord of the Treasury. Though not technically a favourite with Queen Anne, he was after her accession appointed Lord Treasurer on the strong recommendation of Marlborough, and he retained the office for eight years. Sarah Churchill later wrote that if Anne came to learn anything about politics and statecraft, it was entirely from Godolphin's mentoring, and he eventually became "so integral a part of Anne's coterie that she and Sarah dubbed him with an alias of his own, so that in their parlance he went by, and answered to, the name of Mr Montgomery." In 1704, he was also made a Knight of the Garter, and in December 1706, he was created Viscount Rialton and Earl of Godolphin.

Though a Tory, he had an active share in the intrigues that gradually led to the predominance of the Whigs in alliance with Marlborough: the two were nicknamed "the Duumvirs". The influence of the Marlboroughs with the queen was, however, gradually supplanted by that of Abigail Masham and Robert Harley (later Earl of Oxford), and with the fortunes of the Marlboroughs, those of Godolphin were indissolubly united. The Queen initially relied heavily on his guidance, but relations became strained. Eventually, when he threatened to resign, she said coldly, "Do as you please... there are many to take your place". The services of both Marlborough and Godolphin were so appreciated by the nation that for a time, they regarded the loss of the queen's favour with indifference and even in 1708 to procure the expulsion of Harley from office. However, after the High Tory reaction to the impeachment of Henry Sacheverell, who had abused Godolphin under the name of Volpone, Anne made use of the opportunity to get rid of Marlborough by abruptly dismissing Godolphin from office on 7 August 1710 in tones as cold and ungrateful as those that she later used with Marlborough. Godolphin died two years later and his estate was worth more than £12,000. He is buried in the south aisle of the nave of Westminster Abbey. On the wall is a bust of him by the sculptor Francis Bird.

== Marriage and succession ==
On 16 May 1675, Godolphin married Margaret Blagge, daughter of Thomas Blagge, the pious lady whose life was written by John Evelyn in his book The Life of Mrs Godolphin. She died in childbirth in 1678 bearing his only son, and Godolphin never remarried. Margaret is buried at Breage, Cornwall, the spot being marked by a small brass floor plaque commissioned by the Duke of Leeds. Progeny:

- Francis Godolphin, 2nd Earl of Godolphin (1678–1766)

== Gallery ==
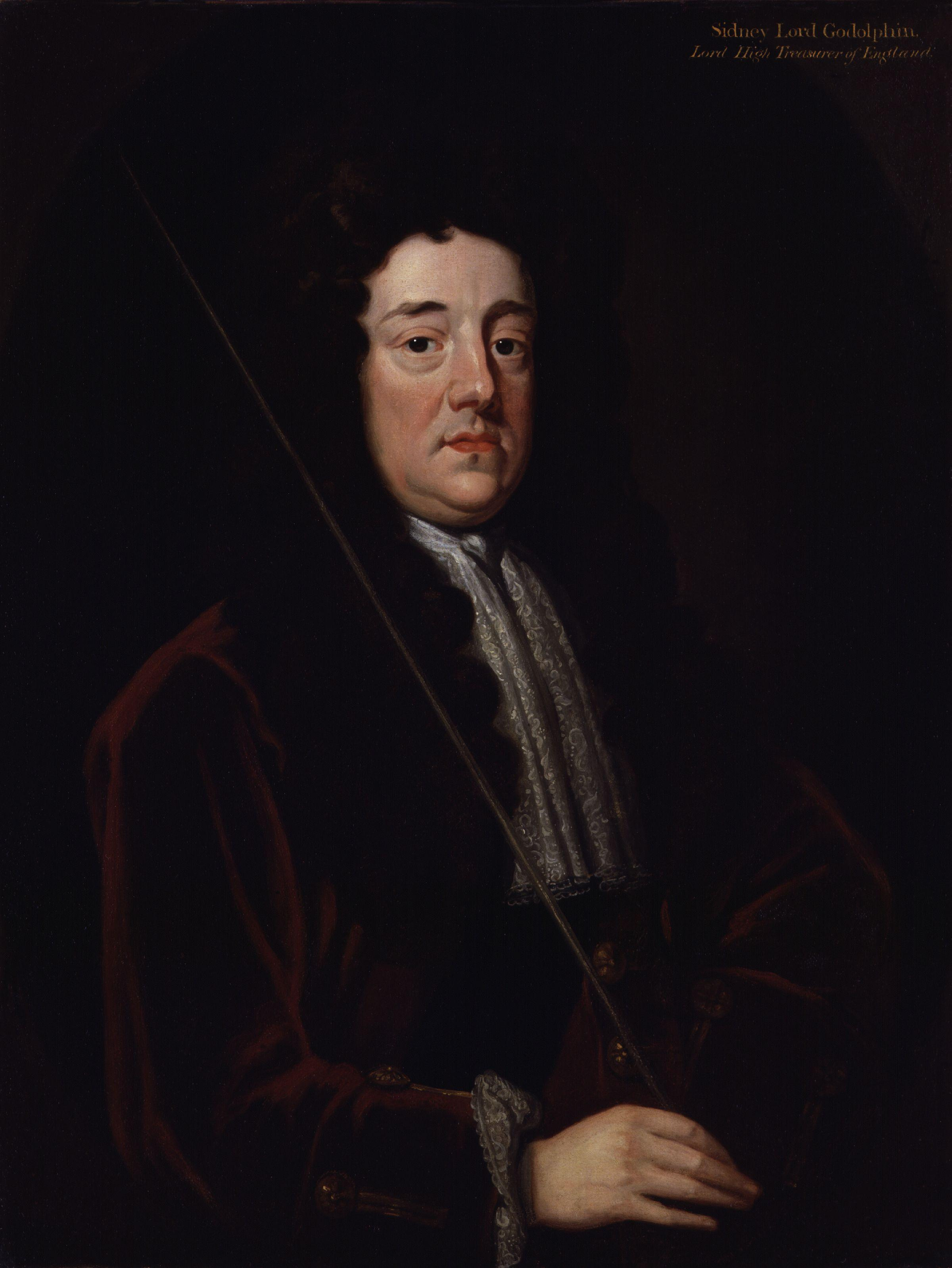
Sidney Godolphin, 1st Earl of Godolphin by Godfrey Kneller

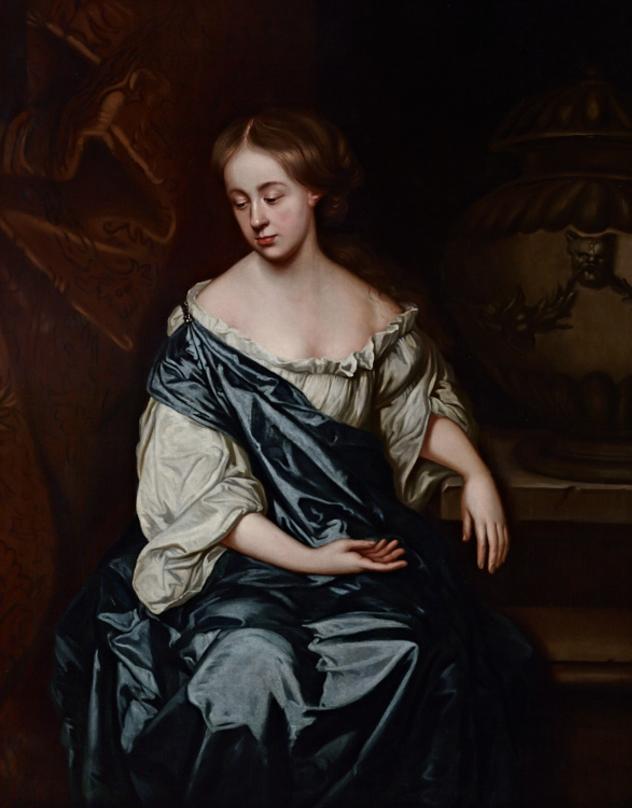
Margaret Blagge, wife of Sidney Godolphin, portrait by Matthew Dixon

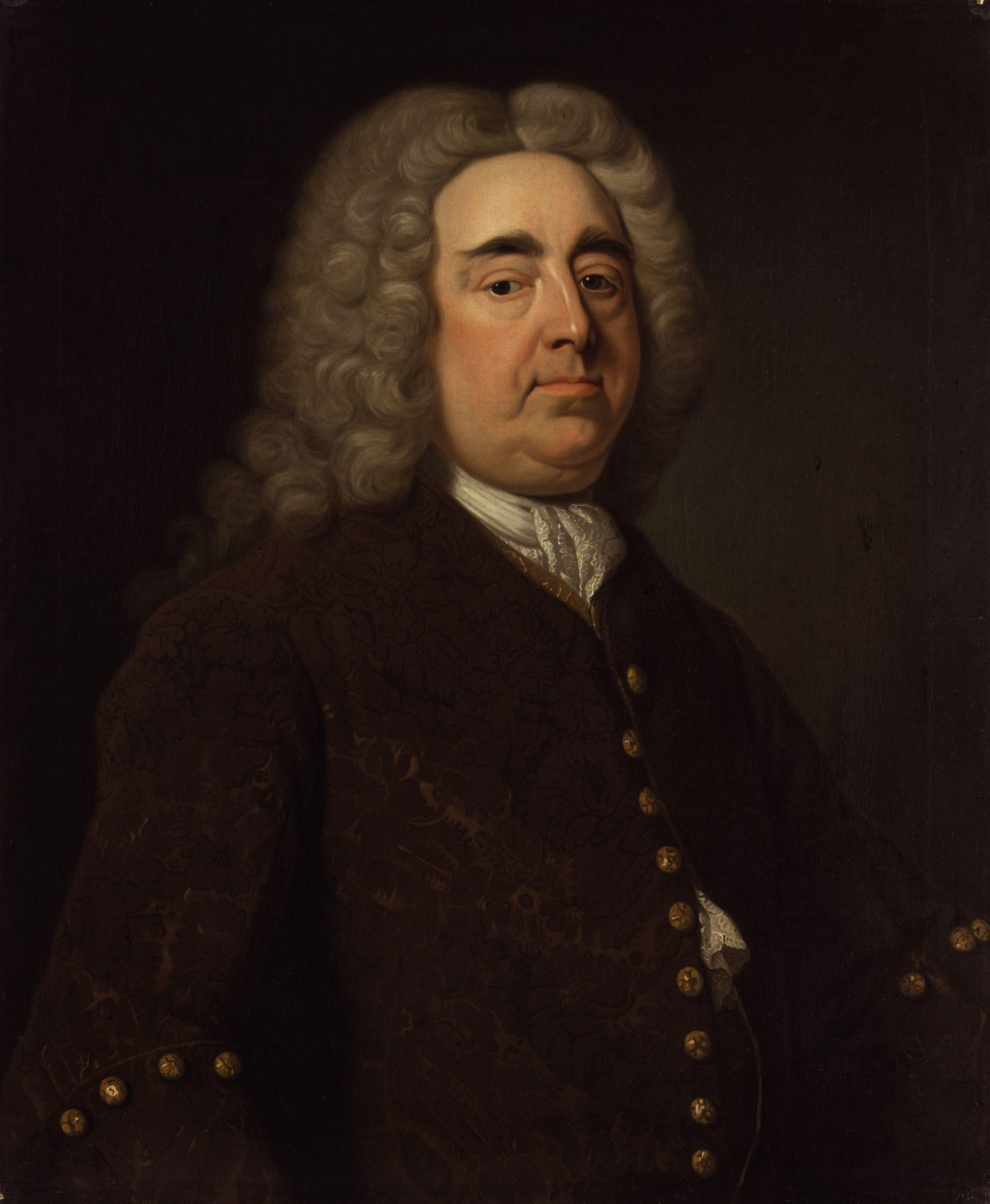
Francis Godolphin, 2nd Earl of Godolphin by Jean-Baptiste van Loo

== Legacy ==
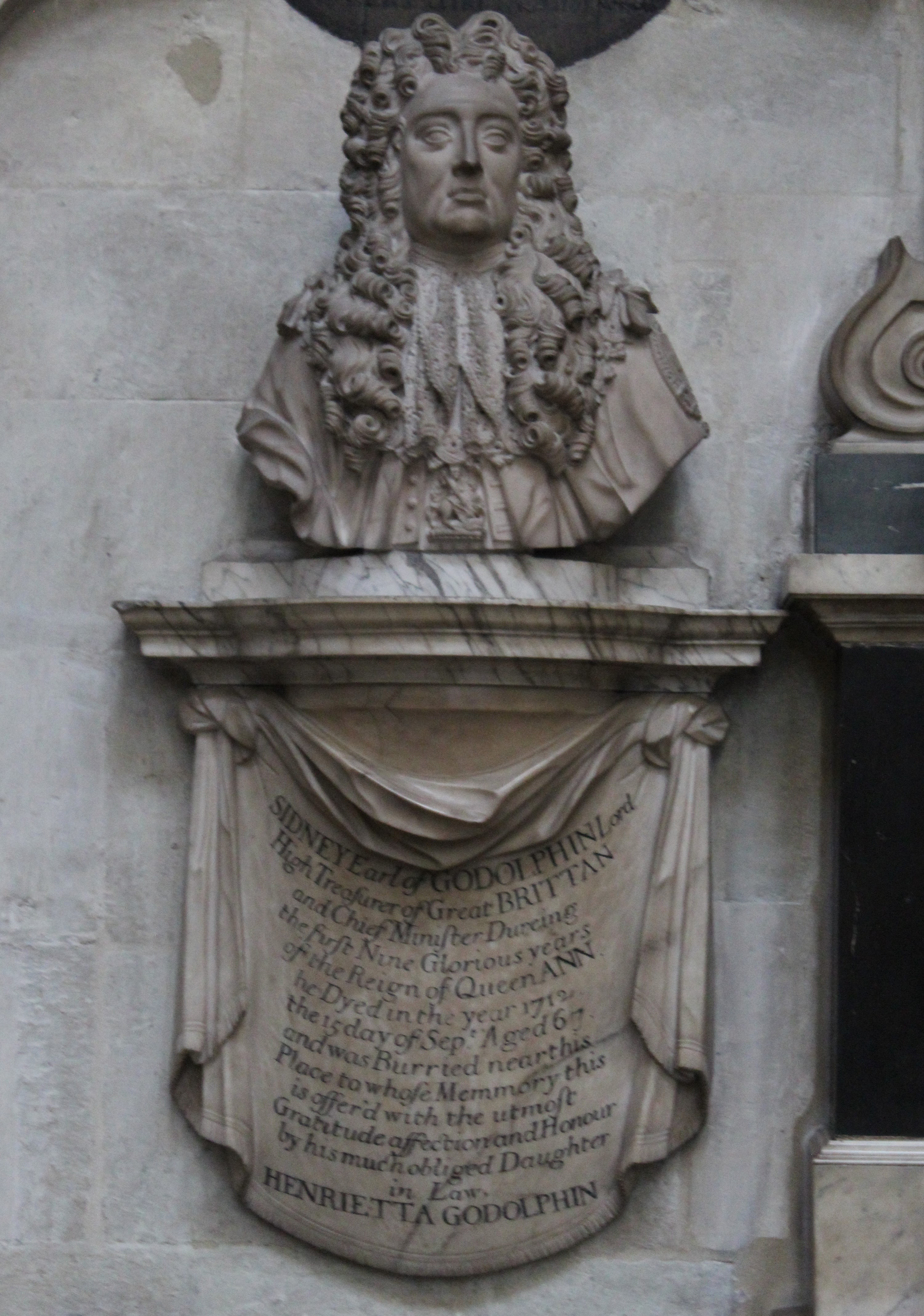
Memorial to Godolphin in Westminster Abbey

The Whig historian Lord Macaulay said of Godolphin in 1848:

He was laborious, clear-headed, and profoundly versed in the details of finance. Every government, therefore, found him an useful servant; and there was nothing in his opinions or in his character which could prevent him from serving any government. "Sidney Godolphin," said Charles, "is never in the way, and never out of the way." This pointed remark goes far to explain Godolphin's extraordinary success in life. He acted at different times with both the great political parties; but he never shared in the passions of either. Like most men of cautious tempers and prosperous fortunes, he had a strong disposition to support whatever existed. He disliked revolutions, and, for the same reason for which he disliked revolutions, he disliked counter-revolutions. His deportment was remarkably grave and reserved, but his personal tastes were low and frivolous; and most of the time which he could save from public business was spent in racing, cardplaying, and cockfighting.

In the opinion of Julian Hoppit, Godolphin "tirelessly oversaw the dramatic expansion of key areas of the State, providing an element of integrity, continuity, and predictability in a very uncertain environment. He was in a very real sense Marlborough's partner and together the duumvirs oversaw the glory days of the War of the Spanish Succession. In a very real sense Marlborough's dismissal and Godolphin's death the following year marked the end of an era". Roy Sundstrom asserted that Godolphin is an important figure in the history of England:

[…] first he raised the money required to blunt French hegemony in Europe and thus preserved the British constitution and the protestant monarchy; second he was instrumental in planning the military and diplomatic strategy that ultimately defeated Louis XIV; third, as lord high treasurer, he worked to make the Treasury more efficient and attempted to weed out corruption—the Treasury as he left it served England well for the remainder of the eighteenth century; fourth he was instrumental in negotiating and passing the Act of Union with Scotland which created the united kingdom of Great Britain; and fifth he negotiated the creation of a unified East India Company, which would be instrumental in establishing British rule in India.

== Notes ==
=== Primary sources ===
- Dickinson, William Calvin (1990). Sidney Godolphin, Lord Treasurer, 1702-10. Edwin Meller Press.
- Snyder, H. L. (1975). The Marlborough–Godolphin correspondence. Vol. 3 vols.
- Sundstrom, Roy A. (1993). Sidney Godolphin: Servant of the State. Dover: University of Delaware Press.

=== Secondary sources ===
- Hoppitt, Julian (2000). A Land of Liberty? England 1689-1727. Oxford: Clarendon Press.
- Macaulay, Thomas Babington (1889). The History of England from the Accession of James the Second. Vol. Two Volumes. London: Longmans.
- Ogg, David (1969). England in the Reigns of James II and William III. London: Oxford University Press.
- Sundstrom, Roy A. (May 2009) [2004]. "Godolphin, Sidney, first earl of Godolphin (1645–1712)". Oxford Dictionary of National Biography (online ed.). Oxford University Press. doi:10.1093/ref:odnb/10882. (Subscription, Wikipedia Library access or UK public library membership required.)

Parliament of England
| Preceded by Sir Peter Killigrew; Sir William Godolphin | Member of Parliament for Helston; 1665 – Feb 1679; With: Sir William Godolphin | Succeeded by Sir Vyell Vyvyan; Sir William Godolphin |
| Preceded by Sir Vyell Vyvyan; Sir William Godolphin | Member of Parliament for Helston; Sep 1679 – 1685; With: Sir Vyell Vyvyan 1679–1681; Charles Godolphin 1681–1685 | Succeeded by Sidney Godolphin; Charles Godolphin |
Court offices
| Preceded by Laurence Hyde | Master of the Robes; 1678–1679 | Succeeded by Henry Sydney |
Political offices
| Preceded by The Earl of Sunderland | Northern Secretary; 1684 | Succeeded by The Earl of Middleton |
| Preceded by The Earl of Rochester | First Lord of the Treasury; 1684–1685 | Succeeded by The Earl of Rochester (Lord High Treasurer) |
| Preceded by Sir John Lowther, Bt | First Lord of the Treasury; 1690–1697 | Succeeded by Charles Montagu |
| Preceded by The Earl of Tankerville | First Lord of the Treasury; 1700–1701 | Succeeded by The Earl of Carlisle |
| Preceded by In Commission (First Lord: The Earl of Carlisle) | Lord High Treasurer; 1702–1710 | Succeeded by In Commission (First Lord: The Earl Poulett) |
| Vacant Title last held by The Marquess of Carmarthen | Chief Minister of England (and then of Great Britain from 1707); 1702–1710 | Succeeded by The Earl of Oxford and Earl Mortimer |
Honorary titles
| Preceded by The Lord Granville | Lord Lieutenant and Custos Rotulorum of Cornwall; 1705 – 1710 | Succeeded by The Earl of Rochester |
| Preceded by Francis Godolphin | Governor of the Isles of Scilly; 1667−1712 | Succeeded by Francis Godolphin |
Peerage of England
| New creation | Earl of Godolphin; 1706 – 1712 | Succeeded by Francis Godolphin |
| New creation | Baron Godolphin; 1684 – 1712 | Succeeded by Francis Godolphin |
