= William Clerk (jurist) =

English civil lawyer

William Clerk, LL.D. (died 1655) was an English civil lawyer.

== Life ==
He received his education at Trinity Hall, Cambridge (LL.B. 1609, LL.D. 1629). He was admitted an advocate at Doctors' Commons on 23 October 1629, and in 1639 he occurs as official of the archdeacon of London. He was appointed one of the judges of the admiralty in 1651. His death occurred about August 1655.

He was author of An Epitome of certaine late Aspersions cast at Civilians, the Civil and Ecclesiastical Lawes, the Courts Christian, and at Bishops and their Chancellors, wherein the Authors thereof are refuted and repelled, Dublin, 1631. This treatise is chiefly in answer to the preface of Sir John Davies's Reports, and to some parts of the case of præmunire reported by him.
