= William Godolphin (1547–1589) =

Member of the Parliament of England

Godolphin arms, Gules, an eagle with two heads, displayed between three fleurs-de-lys, two and one, argent

Sir William Godolphin (1547 – October 1589), of Treveneage in Cornwall, was an English Member of Parliament. He was the younger son of Thomas Godolphin, Captain (governor) of the Scilly Isles, a member of one of Cornwall's leading families, and his wife Katherine Bonithon; his older brother, Sir Francis, who took over the governorship of the Scillies from their father, was also an MP and Vice-Warden of the Stannaries. Sir William represented Helston, at that period the Godolphin family borough, in the Parliament of 1586–7. He married Jane Gaverigan on 11 December 1587, only shortly before his death. His son, Francis, was MP for St Ives in the Long Parliament.

Parliament of England
Preceded by William Cooke; William Lewis	Member of Parliament for Helston; 1586–1587; With: Hannibal Vyvyan	Succeeded by William Briggin; Christopher Osborne
