= Mary Alice Douglas =

English headmistress

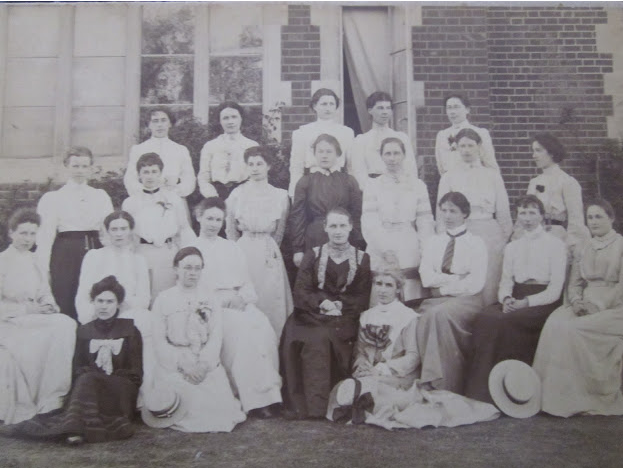
Mary Douglas and her colleagues at Godolphin School in 1901

Mary Alice Douglas (1860–1941) was an English headmistress at Godolphin School.

== Early life and education ==
She was born 29 November 1860 at Salwarpe, Worcestershire, the eighth of sixteen children of rector William Douglas and his wife Frances, née How. Educated at home, she taught at Worcester Girls’ High School at the age of 22 before attending Westfield College, London, in 1884–5.

== Headmistress of Godolphin ==
Douglas was appointed headmistress of Godolphin School, Salisbury, in 1890. Her 28-year headship saw the student body expand from 22 to 230 and the opening of several new purpose-built buildings to accommodate the larger numbers of girls. Douglas’ stated aim was 'to teach the girls to think for themselves, to desire what is good and true and to overcome difficulties by perseverance'.

In 1911, she and Sarah Burstall edited and published Public Schools for Girls: a Series of Papers on their History, Aims and Schemes of Study, arguing for greater specialisation in the curriculum of girls who intended to go on to college. Godolphin School sent several pupils to the women's colleges at Oxford and Cambridge under her headship.

She chaired the Association of Headmistresses from 1911 to 1913, and helmed the school through World War I, when the pupils contributed to local farming.

She retired in 1919 and died on 7 November 1941 at the home she shared with a brother and sister in Wantage, Berkshire.
