= Charles Godolphin =

English Tory politician (c.1651–1720)

Godolphin arms, Gules, an eagle with two heads, displayed between three fleurs-de-lys, two and one, argent

Charles Godolphin (c. 1651 – 10 July 1720) was an English Tory politician, lawyer, landowner, and Member of Parliament (MP) for Helston during the late 17th and early 18th centuries. His political opinions and activity largely aligned with those of his older and more influential brother, Sidney Godolphin, 1st Earl of Godolphin.

== Early life ==
Charles Godolphin was born in circa 1651, the fifth son of Sir Francis Godolphin and Dorothy Berkeley. The Godolphin family were prominent landowners in Cornwall, with strong political influence over the county. Godolphin was educated at Wadham College, Oxford, matriculating in 1666. He then attended the Middle Temple from 1670 to train in law. He was called to the bar in 1677, although there is no evidence that he ever practised as a barrister. In 1676, he is recorded as investing £400 in the East India Company and he later obtained a significant yield from the Royal African Company.

== Political career ==
Godolphin served under his brother, Sidney, at the Treasury, and was elected alongside Sidney as an MP for Helston in 1681. He attended the Oxford Parliament, but played no known part in it. After the dissolution of parliament, he was given a post in the stannary administration in Cornwall, which he held until his death. Godolphin was re-elected for Helston in 1685, but was again inactive in the Commons. He was elected to the Convention Parliament in 1689, during which he was appointed to eight committees and made 15 recorded speeches.

He was soon identified with Tory politics; he voted to agree with the Lords that the throne was not vacant after the flight of James II, and supported the includsion of the phrase "to preserve the Church, as it is now established by law" in the new Coronation Oath Act 1688. Godolphin was appointed to a committee tasked with thanking the King for his declaration to maintain the Church of England. He proposed an amendment to the Bill of Rights 1689, asserting the merit of Mary II's right to the throne so that "the monarchy might be looked upon as hereditary and not elective". He defended the amendments against criticisms that it served French interests. He opposed the bill to suspend of the Habeas Corpus Act 1679, declaring that "some time ago we did arraign the Government of arbitrary power exercised against law. We go about now to establish arbitrary government by law".

He continued to support his brother, Sidney, throughout his leadership of the ministry. Godolphin gave up his parliamentary seat at the second election of 1701 when it was declared incompatible with his position as chairman of the Board of Customs. He was a justice of the peace for Cornwall by 1701. In 1702, he was appointed a commissioner to negotiate union with Scotland. He, and other Tory commissioners, duly convened at Whitehall Palace in November 1702, but the group showed little interest in progressing the issue. The commission was adjourned on 3 February 1703 until October, but never reconvened.

== Personal life ==
He married his cousin, Elizabeth Godolphin, on 27 June 1687. The couple had two children, both of whom died in infancy. The marriage brought Godolphin into the possession of an estate at Coulston, Wiltshire, although the couple lived mostly in St James's, London. Godolphin died on 10 July 1720 and was buried in Westminster Abbey, where a monument was erected to him, his wife and children.

Parliament of England
Preceded by Sidney Godolphin; Sir Vyell Vyvyan, Bt	Member of Parliament for Helston with Sidney Godolphin (1681–1685); Sidney Godolphin (1685–1689); Sir John St Aubyn, Bt (1689–1695); Francis Godolphin (1695–1698); Sidney Godolphin (1698–1701); 1681–1701	Succeeded by Sidney Godolphin; Francis Godolphin
