= Sidney Godolphin (poet) =

English poet, courtier and politician (1610–1643)

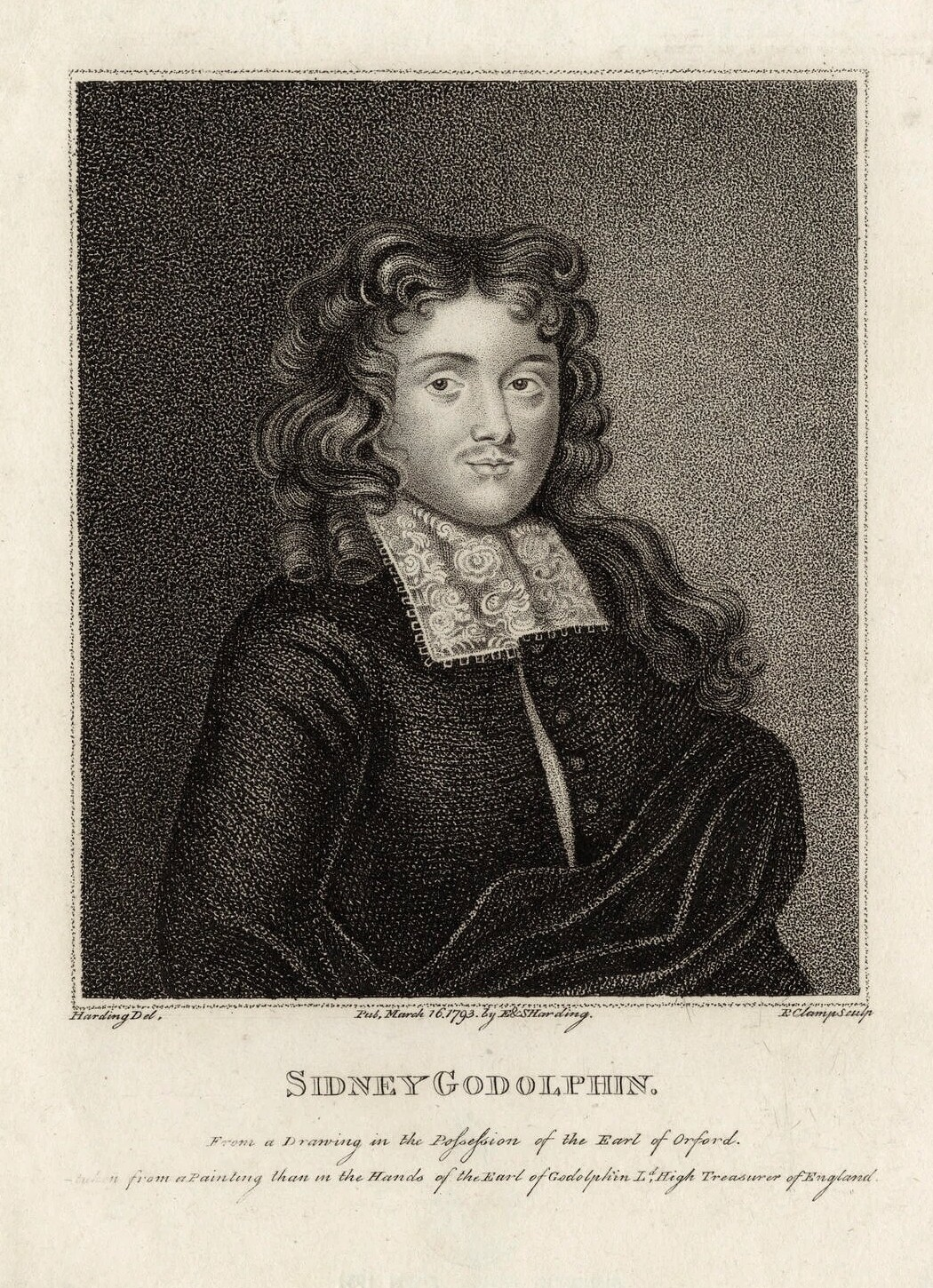
- Sidney Godolphin

Member of Parliament for Helston
- In office November 1640 – February 1643

Governor of Scilly
- In office 1636–1643

Personal details
- Born: 14 January 1610 (baptised) Breage, Cornwall
- Died: 8 February 1643 (aged 33) Okehampton
- Resting place: All Saints, Okehampton
- Education: Exeter College, Oxford
- Occupation: Poet and courtier

Military service
- Years of service: 1639 to 1643
- Battles/wars: Bishops' Wars; First English Civil War; Braddock Down

Sidney Godolphin, 14 January 1610 (baptised) to 8 February 1643, was a minor poet and courtier from Cornwall who sat in the House of Commons between 1628 and 1643. He served in the Royalist army during the First English Civil War and was killed in a skirmish near Chagford in Devon on 8 February 1643.

Godolphin arms, Gules, an eagle with two heads, displayed between three fleurs-de-lys, two and one, argent

== Personal details ==
Godolphin was baptised on 14 January 1610, second son of Sir William Godolphin (1567-1613) of Godolphin Estate, near Breage, Cornwall, and his wife, Thomasine (1581-1612). He had two brothers, Francis (1605-1667) and William (1611-1636), as well as a sister, Penelope (1607-1669), who married Charles Berkeley, 2nd Viscount Fitzhardinge. He never married and left no children.

== Career ==
Orphaned by the time he was three, Godolphin inherited his mother's estates in Norfolk and had enough money to live independently. He attended Exeter College, Oxford, from 1624 to 1627, followed by a period acquiring the basic legal training then considered essential for members of the gentry. Elected along with his brother Francis as one of the two MPs for Helston to the 1628 Parliament, he played little part in its activities before it was dissolved in 1629, ushering in eleven years of Personal Rule.

He spent the next few years travelling in France and the Low Countries, and in 1632 accompanied his distant relative Robert Sidney, 2nd Earl of Leicester on a diplomatic mission to Denmark-Norway. On his return to England, Godolphin took up residence at court and became part of the Great Tew circle, a collection of writers and poets clustered around Lucius Cary, 2nd Viscount Falkland. Other members included Edward Hyde and the political theorist Thomas Hobbes, who later dedicated Leviathan to his brother Francis.

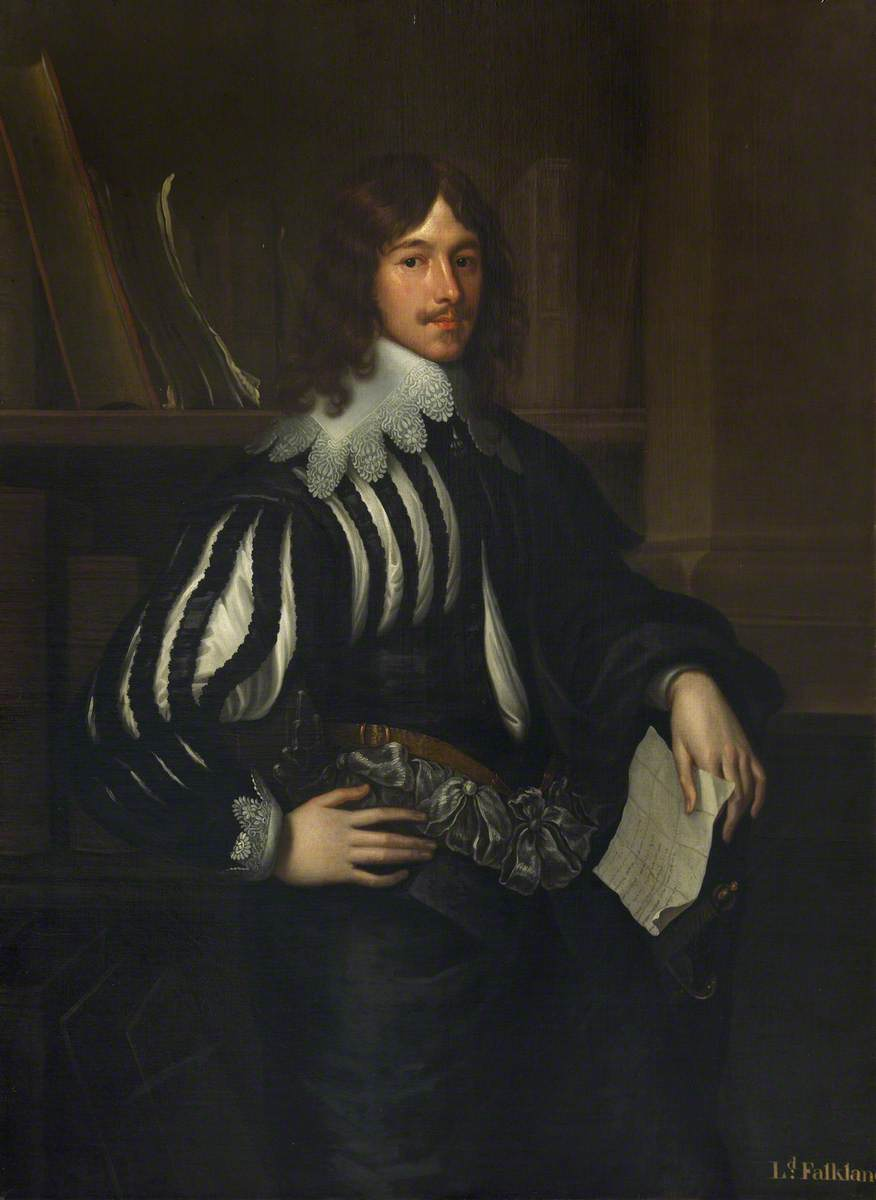
Godolphin was part of the Great Tew circle, headed by the moderate Royalist Lucius Cary, 2nd Viscount Falkland, also killed in 1643

From 1568 to 1834, the Godolphin family owned the lease on the Isles of Scilly and when his younger brother William died in 1636, Godolphin succeeded him as Governor. During the Bishops' Wars in 1639, he served in a troop of horse commanded by Sir Ralph Hopton, although he did not see action. He was re-elected as MP for Helston to both the Short Parliament in April 1640, and the Long Parliament in November.

He consistently supported the Crown and in May 1641 was one of 59 MPs named as "betrayers of their country" for voting against the Bill of Attainder for Strafford. Other MPs who voted against the Bill included Nicholas Slanning, John Trevanion, and John Arundel, all of whom would later be killed fighting for the Royalists. Most of the Royalist MPs withdrew in April 1642 but Godolphin remained until just before the First English Civil War began in August.

He refused an officer's commission and instead served as a trooper in the Western Royalist army commanded by Sir Ralph Hopton, although according to Clarendon his advice was highly valued in spite of his lack of military experience. He fought at Braddock Down in January, a victory which secured Cornwall for Charles I and allowed Hopton to cross the River Tamar into Devon. Godolphin was part of a scouting party led by John Berkeley ambushed by Parliamentarian troops while passing through the town of Chagford. During the skirmish, he was shot and killed.

He was buried two days later in the chancel of All Saints Church in Okehampton on 10 February 1643.

== Poems ==
Godolphin left poems which were never collected in a separate volume. "The Passion of Dido for Æneas, as it is incomparably expressed in the fourth book of Virgil," finished by Edmund Waller, was published in 1658 and 1679, and is in the fourth volume of Dryden's Miscellany Poems. He was one of "certain persons of quality" whose translation of Pierre Corneille's The La Mort de Pompée was published in 1664. A song is in George Ellis's Specimens of the Early English Poets, and another in the Tixall Poetry. Other poems in manuscript are in the Harleian MSS. (6917) and the Malone MSS. in the Bodleian Library. His elegy on John Donne was included in the second edition of the poet's collected poetry (1635) and commendatory verses by him are prefixed to Sandys's Paraphrase (1638), and an "Epitaph upon the Lady Rich" is in John Gauden's Funerals made Cordial (1658). Edmund Gosse writes that "it is probable that if Godolphin had lived, his executive skill in verse would have hastened the coming of the Augustan era."

== Haunting ==
It is alleged that Godolphin's ghost haunts The Three Crowns Hotel in Chagford. He is said to stride the corridors in full uniform.

== Notes ==
Parliament of England
Preceded by Francis Godolphin; Francis Carew	Member of Parliament for Helston; 1628–1629; With: William Noy	Parliament suspended until 1640
Vacant Parliament suspended since 1629	Member of Parliament for Helston; 1640–1643; With: William Godolphin 1640; Francis Godolphin	Succeeded by John Penrose; John Thomas
Honorary titles
Preceded by William Godolphin	Governor of the Isles of Scilly; 1636–1643	Succeeded by Francis Godolphin
