= Godolphin School =

Co-ed school in Salisbury, Wiltshire, England

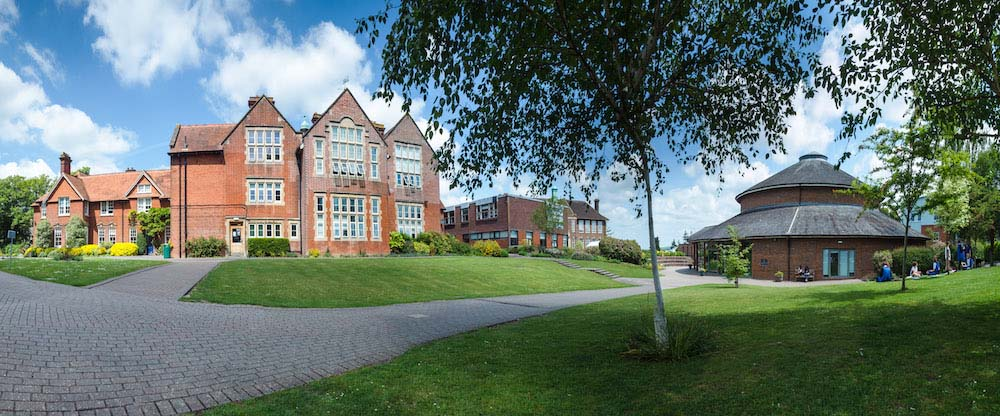

Location
- Milford Hill; Salisbury, Wiltshire, SP1 2RA; England
- Coordinates: 51°04′08″N 1°47′07″W

Information
- Type: Private day and boarding
- Motto: Franc ha leal eto ge Frank and loyal thou art
- Established: 1726; 300 years ago
- Founder: Elizabeth Godolphin
- Department for Education URN: 126519 Tables
- Head: Jenny Price
- Gender: Girls and Boys
- Age: 3 to 19
- Enrolment: 320 (2025)
- Publication: Gazette
- Website: www.godolphin.org

Godolphin School is a private boarding and day school for girls and boys in Salisbury, Wiltshire, England, which was founded in 1726 and opened in 1784. The school caters for pupils aged 3 to 19, although most enter at ages 11+, 13+ and 16+. There were 320 pupils in August 2025.

== History ==
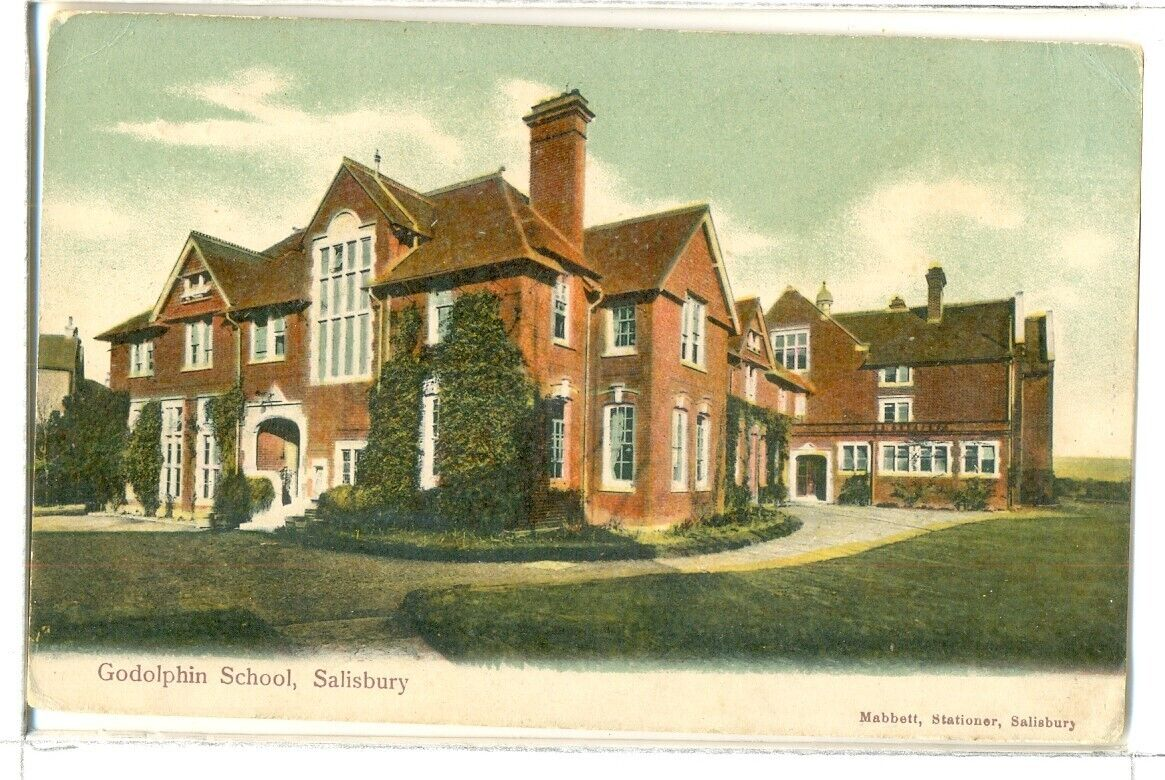
Godolphin School on a circa 1906 postcard, published by Mabbett, Stationer, Salisbury

Godolphin was founded by Elizabeth Godolphin using her own money and some from the estate of her husband, Charles Godolphin (c.1650–1720), who was a Member of Parliament for Helston, Cornwall. She created the school originally for the education of eight young orphaned gentlewomen. According to the terms of the will, the beneficiaries were to be daughters of members of the Church of England, between eight and twelve years of age, born in Salisbury or some other Wiltshire town, and to have had "some portion left to them but not exceeding £400".

The girls were to be taught to "dance, work, read, write, cast accounts and the business of housewifery". This was a fairly advanced curriculum for its time, since girls of this class were expected to be able to read but not necessarily to be able to write. The new charity was initially to be administered by her nephew William Godolphin and his heirs, The dean and chapter declined to take on the task on the grounds that the idea of educating women was "mere foolery and dreaming". Every year, in November, the school commemorates its founder Elizabeth Godolphin when the head girl, accompanied by members of the upper sixth and the Old Girls Association (OGA), lay a wreath on her tomb in the cloister of Westminster Abbey. This ceremony is known to girls past and present as "Commem."

The school did not open its doors until 9 August 1784, when it was set up in Rosemary Lane, in the Cathedral Close, Salisbury. It later occupied various houses in the vicinity, including Arundells, more recently the home of Sir Edward Heath, and finally the King's House. A prospectus of 1789, written by the headmistress, Mrs Voysey, promised a regime of early rising, "agreeable exercise" and a diet of wholesome books "such as enlarge the heart to Virtue and excellency of Sentiment".

Following an outbreak of cholera in 1848, the school moved to Milford Hill, where for nearly half a century it occupied various premises, including Fawcett House on Elm Grove, which was later to become the Swan School. Under the leadership of Miss Polhill (1854–1857) and M. T. Andrews (1875–1890), numbers were small and the curriculum narrow. Then, in 1890, Mary Douglas arrived. Described variously as a 'headmistress of genius' and 'the second founder of the school', her headship saw a tenfold increase in numbers from 23 in 1890 to 230 in 1920, the year she retired. In 1891, the distinctive red-brick building on the top of Milford Hill was opened at a cost of £4,000, and in the years that followed several new boarding houses were added. During the 1890s school fees were 4 guineas per term for pupils under 12, 5 guineas for pupils from 12 to 15, and 6 guineas for pupils over 15.

In 1904, an additional six acres were purchased to extend the school grounds, which were then landscaped on the side facing Laverstock. In 1914, oak panelling was installed in the Main Hall, and in 1925 an open-air swimming pool was opened. Additions to the school since the Second World War have included a new library building, several new boarding houses, a science and technology block, a prep school, a performing arts centre, an indoor swimming pool with fitness centre, a new boarding house and a Sixth Form Centre.

The arms and motto of the school are those of the Godolphin family. The motto Franc ha leal eto ge is Old Cornish and means 'Frank and loyal art thou'.

In 2024, the school joined United Learning, a group of over 90 independent schools and academies.

From September 2025, Godolphin became co-educational.

== Headmistresses ==
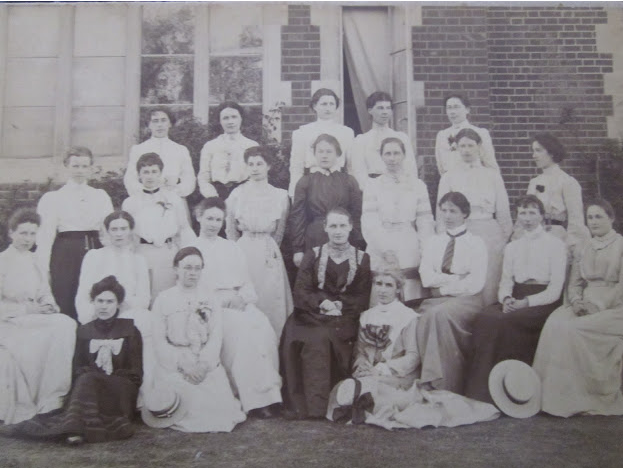
Mary Alice Douglas surrounded by colleagues

- Mrs Voysey
- 1784–: Miss Giffard (Mrs Davis)
- 1815–: Anna Maria Alford
- 1829–: Miss Emily
- 1832–1854: Margaret Bazeley
- 1854–1857: Miss Polhill (Mrs Cother)
- 1857–1875: Emma Polhill
- 1875–1890: M. T. Andrews
- 1890–1919: Mary Alice Douglas
- 1920–1935: Cecily Ray Ash
- 1935–1940: D. M. M. Edwards-Rees
- 1940–1958: G. May Jerred
- 1958–1967: Miss Engledow
- 1968–1980: Veronica Fraser
- 1980–1989: Elizabeth Prescott-Decie (Hannay)
- 1989–1996: Hilary Fender
- 1996–2010: Jill Horsburgh
- 2010–2013: Samantha Price
- 2014–2022: Emma Hattersley
- 2022– : Jenny Price

== Notable former pupils ==
- Minette Batters, business owner, farmer, NFU President
- Antonia Bernath, actor
- Sheila Callender, haematologist
- Mary Cartwright, mathematician
- Jilly Cooper, writer
- Molly Harrower, psychologist
- Deborah Meaden, business entrepreneur
- Dame Anna Pauffley, High Court judge
- Isabel Quigly, novelist and translator
- Dorothy L. Sayers, writer
- Mary Spender, singer and songwriter
- Dorothy Spicer, aviator, first woman to gain an advanced qualification in aeronautical engineering
- Catherine Steadman, actor and writer
- Theodora Turner, nurse
- Minette Walters, writer
- Hannah White, sailor
