= Francis Godolphin, 2nd Earl of Godolphin =

English courtier and politician (1678-1766)

The Right Honourable The Earl of Godolphin PC
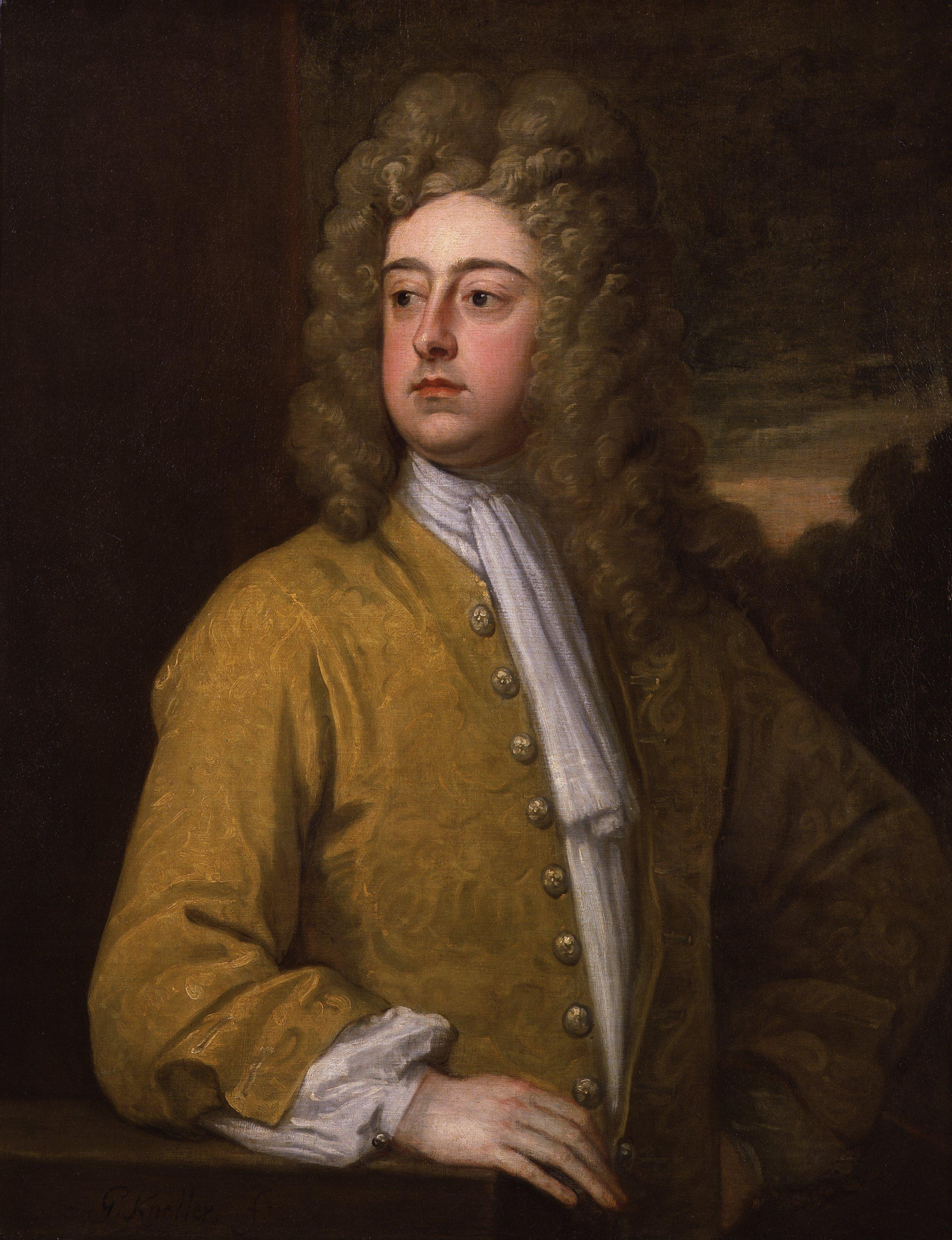
- Portrait by Godfrey Kneller

Lord Privy Seal
- In office 16 May 1735 – 7 April 1740
- Monarch: George II
- Preceded by: The Viscount Lonsdale
- Succeeded by: The Lord Hervey

Cofferer of the Household
- In office 1714–1723
- Monarch: George I
- Preceded by: The Lord Masham
- Succeeded by: The Earl of Bath
- In office 1704–1711
- Monarch: Anne
- Preceded by: Sir Benjamin Bathurst
- Succeeded by: The Lord Masham

Teller of the Exchequer
- In office 1699–1704
- Monarchs: William III, Anne
- Preceded by: Henry Carew
- Succeeded by: Thomas Coke

Personal details
- Born: 3 September 1678 Whitehall, London, England
- Died: 17 January 1766 (aged 87)
- Spouse: Henrietta Churchill, 2nd Duchess of Marlborough (m. 1698; died 1733)
- Children: William Godolphin, Marquess of Blandford; Lord Henry Godolphin; Lady Margaret Godolphin; Harriet Pelham-Holles, Duchess of Newcastle; Mary Osborne, Duchess of Leeds
- Parents: Sidney Godolphin, 1st Earl of Godolphin; Margaret Blagge
- Education: Eton College; King's College, Cambridge (M.A., 1705)

Francis Godolphin, 2nd Earl of Godolphin, PC (3 September 1678 – 17 January 1766), styled Viscount Rialton from 1706 to 1712, was an English courtier and politician who sat in the English and British House of Commons between 1695 and 1712, when he succeeded to the peerage as Earl of Godolphin. Initially a Tory, he modified his views when his father headed the Administration in 1702 and was eventually a Whig. He was a philanthropist and one of the founding governors of the Foundling Hospital in 1739.

== Early life ==
Godolphin, the only child of Sidney Godolphin, 1st Earl of Godolphin, was born in Whitehall, London, on 3 September 1678, and baptised the same day. His mother, Margaret Godolphin (née Blagge), died six days later on 9 September. John Evelyn, her most intimate acquaintance, transferred his friendship to her infant son, took general charge of his education, and continued to further his welfare as he grew. Godolphin was educated at Eton College and King's College, Cambridge, earning an M.A. degree in 1705.

== Career ==
Godolphin was returned as Member of Parliament for Helston at the 1695 English general election. He voted against the attainder of Sir John Fenwick on 25 November 1696. His first public appointment was joint registrar of the Court of Chancery on 29 June 1698, which he held until 20 January 1727. He did not stand at the 1698 English general election. He also held the place of one of the tellers of the Exchequer from 1699 to 1704. He was returned as MP for East Looe at the first general election of 1701, and at the second general election of that year, he was returned for both Helston and East Looe and chose to sit for Helston. He was classed as a Tory and on 26 February 1702, supported the motion vindicating the Commons’ proceedings against the Whig ministers. He was returned for Helston at the 1702 English general election, but with the Administration headed by his father, he began to switch his loyalty to the Court. Early in 1704, his father and the Duchess of Marlborough obtained the post of Cofferer of the Household for him, which he held until 1711. Godolphin was seen as an opponent of the Tack and did not vote for it on 28 November 1704. He was appointed Lord Warden of the Stannaries, high steward of the Duchy of Cornwall, and rider and master forester of Dartmoor at the beginning of 1705. At the 1705 English general election, he tried to unseat two Tackers when he stood for the Cambridge University constituency but was defeated. He also stood again at Helston and was returned as MP there. He voted for the Court candidate for Speaker on 25 October 1705.

Godolphin was known by the courtesy title of Viscount Rialton from 29 December 1706 until 1712. Early in 1708, he gave up the office of Warden of the Stannaries and the other posts, which had become too burdensome for him. At the 1708 British general election, he was returned as MP for Helston and Oxfordshire and chose to sit at Oxfordshire. In 1710, he voted for the impeachment of Dr Henry Sacheverell. At the 1710 British general election, he decided not to stand at Oxfordshire, was defeated at Penryn, but was returned as MP for Tregony on the Boscawen interest. He was classed as a Whig and lost his post in the Household on the change of Administration. He voted for the ‘No Peace Without Spain’ motion on 7 December 1711. On his father's death on 15 September 1712, he succeeded to the peerage as Earl of Godolphin. He vacated his seat in the House of Commons and joined the House of Lords.

Lord Rialton was again Cofferer of the Household from 1714 to 1723, as well as Lord Lieutenant of Oxfordshire from 1715 to 1735, lord of the bedchamber to George I in 1716, High Steward of Banbury in 1718, and a privy councillor from 26 May 1723. To George II, he was the groom of the stole and first lord of the bedchamber from 1727 to 1735. He was named high steward of Woodstock on 18 March 1728 and appointed Governor of the Scilly Islands on 18 April 1733.

On 23 January 1735, Lord Rialton was created Baron Godolphin of Helston in Cornwall, with special remainder, in default of his issue, to the heir's male of his deceased uncle, Dr Henry Godolphin, dean of St. Paul's. During the king's absence from Britain in 1723, 1725, and 1727, Godolphin acted as one of the lord's justices of the United Kingdom. Finally, as Lord Privy Seal, he was in office from 14 May 1735 to 25 April 1740. The pocket borough of Helston, not far from his ancestral home, Godolphin House, was under his patronage for many years and sent his nominees to Parliament. In return for this compliance, he rebuilt Helston Church in 1763 for £6,000. It was also his custom to pay the rates and taxes for all electors in the borough. It is said that he read only two works: Burnet's History of my own Time and Colley Cibber's Apology. When he had perused them throughout, he began them again.

Godolphin was married in March 1698 to Lady Henrietta Churchill, eldest daughter of John Churchill, 1st Duke of Marlborough, and Sarah Jennings. She was born on 20 July 1681 and baptised at St. Martin-in-the-Fields, London, on 29 July 1681. On her father's death, 16 June 1722, she became Duchess of Marlborough in her own right. She died on 24 October 1733 and was buried in Westminster Abbey on 9 November. Meanwhile, she acquired notoriety through an attachment to William Congreve, the dramatist.

Godolphin was one of the founding governors of the Foundling Hospital, a London charity created in 1739. It aimed to tackle the problem of child abandonment by providing an orphanage where parents could leave babies they considered themselves incapable of raising. He also had the distinction of owning one of the founding thoroughbred sires, the Godolphin Arabian. Among his protégés was the physician and humorist Messenger Monsey, for whom he obtained the position of physician at Royal Chelsea Hospital.

== Death and legacy ==
Lord Godolphin died at his house in the Stable Yard, St James's, on 17 January 1766 and was buried in Kensington Church on 25 January. He and his wife had two sons and four daughters, of whom two sons and a daughter predeceased him.

- William Godolphin, Marquess of Blandford (c. 1699–1731), who married Maria Catherina de Jong
- Lord Henry Godolphin (born February 1701)
- Lady Margaret Godolphin (born c. 1703)
- Lady Henrietta Godolphin (c. 1707–1776), who married the 1st Duke of Newcastle
- Lady Mary Godolphin (1723–1764), who married the 4th Duke of Leeds.

Without living male heirs, the earldom of Godolphin, viscountcy of Rialton, and barony of Godolphin of Rialton became extinct. The last devolved on his cousin Francis Godolphin, 2nd Baron Godolphin of Helston.

== Notes ==
Parliament of England
Preceded by Charles Godolphin; Sir John St Aubyn, Bt	Member of Parliament for Helston; 1695–1698; With: Charles Godolphin	Succeeded by Charles Godolphin; Sidney Godolphin
Preceded by Henry Trelawny; Sir Henry Seymour, Bt	Member of Parliament for East Looe; 1701; With: Sir Henry Seymour, Bt	Succeeded by Sir Henry Seymour, Bt; George Courtenay
Preceded by Charles Godolphin; Sidney Godolphin	Member of Parliament for Helston; 1701–1707; With: Sidney Godolphin	Parliament of England abolished
Parliament of Great Britain
New title	Member of Parliament for Helston; 1707–1708; With: Sidney Godolphin	Succeeded by Sidney Godolphin; John Evelyn
Preceded by Sir Robert Jenkinson, 2nd Bt; Sir Edward Norreys	Member of Parliament for Oxfordshire; 1708–1710; With: Sir Robert Jenkinson, 2nd Bt 1689–1710; Sir Robert Jenkinson, 3rd Bt 1710	Succeeded by Sir Robert Jenkinson, 3rd Bt; Francis Clerke
Preceded by Anthony Nicoll; Thomas Herne	Member of Parliament for Tregony; 1710–1713; With: John Trevanion 1710; George Robinson 1710–1713	Succeeded by George Robinson; Edward Southwell
Political offices
Preceded by Henry Carew	Teller of the Exchequer; 1699–1704	Succeeded by Thomas Coke
Preceded by Sir Benjamin Bathurst	Cofferer of the Household; 1704–1711	Succeeded by Samuel Masham
Preceded by The Lord Masham	Cofferer of the Household; 1714–1723	Succeeded by William Pulteney
Preceded by The Viscount Lonsdale	Lord Privy Seal; 1735–1740	Succeeded by The Lord Hervey
Court offices
Preceded by The Lord Granville	Lord Warden of the Stannaries; 1705–1708	Succeeded by Hugh Boscawen
Honorary titles
Preceded by The Earl of Abingdon	Lord Lieutenant of Oxfordshire; 1715–1739	Succeeded by The Duke of Marlborough
Preceded by Sidney Godolphin	Governor of the Isles of Scilly; 1712–1766	Succeeded by Francis Godolphin, 2nd Baron Godolphin
Peerage of England
Preceded by Sidney Godolphin	Earl of Godolphin; 1712–1766	Extinct
Peerage of Great Britain
New creation	Baron Godolphin; 1735–1766	Succeeded by Francis Godolphin
