= Sir William Godolphin, 1st Baronet =

English politician (c. 1640 – 1710)

Godolphin arms, Gules, an eagle with two heads, displayed between three fleurs-de-lys, two and one, argent

Sir William Godolphin, 1st Baronet (c. 1640 – 27 August 1710), of Godolphin in Cornwall, was an English landowner, politician, and Member of Parliament. He was the eldest son of Sir Francis Godolphin, KB, who had been a Member of Parliament until being barred from sitting because of his Royalist sympathies during the Civil War, and who after the Restoration was knighted in reward for his loyalty. Probably also in token of Sir Francis's services, William was created a baronet on 29 April 1661.

He represented the family borough of Helston in Parliament from 1665 until 1679, but his career was overshadowed by that of his younger brother, Sidney, who rose to be First Lord of the Treasury and was granted a peerage and later an earldom; another brother, Henry, took holy orders and ended as Dean of St Paul's and Provost of Eton. Sir William died unmarried, and the family estates passed to his brother.

Parliament of England
Preceded by Sir Peter Killigrew; Thomas Robinson	Member of Parliament for Helston; 1665–1679; With: Sir Peter Killigrew 1665–1668; Sidney Godolphin 1668–1679; Sir Vyell Vyvyan 1679	Succeeded by Sir Vyell Vyvyan; Sidney Godolphin
Baronetage of England
New creation	Baronet (of Godolphin); 1661–1710	Extinct
