= William Godolphin (1567–1613) =

English knight and politician

The Right Honourable Sir William Godolphin
- Born: 1567
- Died: 1613 (aged 45–46)
- Occupations: Soldier, politician
- Title: Sir
- Spouse: Thomasine Sidney
- Children: 4 (including Sir Francis Godolphin (1605–1667) and Sidney Godolphin)
- Parent(s): Sir Francis Godolphin (1540–1608); Margaret Killigrew

Sir William Godolphin (1567–1613), of Godolphin in Cornwall, was an English knight, soldier, and politician who sat in the House of Commons from 1604 to 1611.

== Biography ==
Godolphin was the older son of Sir Francis Godolphin (1540–1608), also an MP and Governor of the Scilly Isles and his first wife, Margaret Killigrew of Arwenack. He matriculated at Emmanuel College, Cambridge in 1585 and was admitted at Lincoln's Inn on 29 January 1587.

He accompanied the Earl of Essex in his military expedition of 1599–1600 to Ireland, and was knighted on 13 July 1599 for his gallantry in an action at Arklow. He was subsequently put in command of a brigade of cavalry, and he was credited with playing an important part in the victory at the Siege of Kinsale on 24 December 1601, when his troops broke through the enemy line and captured the Spanish commander. For his services, he was highly commended by the Crown, and made a member of the Privy Council of Ireland.

Godolphin was Member of Parliament (MP) for Cornwall in the first parliament of James I from 1604 to 1611, and was regarded as a reliable supporter of Crown policy.

He was Lieutenant-governor of the Scilly Isles from 1597, becoming full Governor on the death of his father in 1608 until his own death in 1613.

Godolphin arms, Gules, an eagle with two heads, displayed between three fleurs-de-lys, two and one, argent

== Search for metal ores ==
Godolphin went to Carlisle to meet the prospectors George Bowes and Bevis Bulmer in November 1603. In August 1608, King James sent him to Scotland to report on a promising new silver mine at Hilderston near Bathgate.

== Marriage ==
He married Thomasine, the only surviving daughter and heiress of Thomas Sidney of Wighton, Norfolk and his wife Mary Southwell of Sydmondham Hall (whose third husband was the distinguished soldier Sir Conyers Clifford) and had 3 sons and a daughter.

== Death ==
In the summer of 1613, when he was at the height of his political influence, Godolphin became seriously ill and died in early September. He was buried at Breage, Cornwall September 5, 1613.

== Family ==
Godolphin's children included:

- Sir Francis Godolphin, KB (1605–1667), his heir
- Sidney Godolphin (1610–1643), the poet
- William Godolphin (1611–1636), who first succeeded his father as Governor of Scilly
- Penelope Godolphin, who married Charles Berkeley, 2nd Viscount Fitzhardinge

== Ancestry ==
Ancestors of William Godolphin (1567–1613)

16. Sir John Godolphin
8. Sir William Godolphin
17. Margaret Trenouth
4. Thomas Godolphin
9. Margaret Glynn
2. Sir Francis Godolphin
5. Katherine Bonithon
1. Sir William Godolphin
3. Margaret Killigrew

Parliament of England
Preceded by Sir Anthony Rous; Jonathan Trelawny	Member of Parliament for Cornwall; 1604–1611; With: Sir Anthony Rous	Succeeded by Sir Richard Carew; John St Aubyn
Honorary titles
Preceded by Francis Godolphin	Governor of the Isles of Scilly; 1568−1608	Succeeded by William Godolphin
