= Francis Godolphin (1605–1667) =

English nobleman and politician

Sir Francis Godolphin KB MP
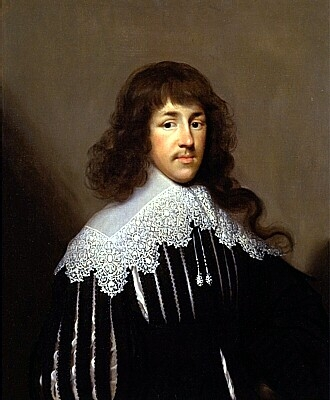
- Sir Francis Godolphin (1605–1667)
- Born: 25 December 1605
- Died: 22 March 1667 (aged 61)
- Occupation: Politician
- Title: Sir
- Spouse: Dorothy Berkeley
- Children: Sir William Godolphin, 1st Baronet; Sidney Godolphin, 1st Earl of Godolphin; Dean Henry Godolphin
- Parent(s): Sir William Godolphin (1567–1613); Thomasine Sidney

Sir Francis Godolphin KB MP (25 December 1605 – 22 March 1667), of Godolphin in Cornwall, was an English nobleman, landowner, politician, and Member of Parliament. His chief claim to fame is that he was the dedicatee of Hobbes' Leviathan.

== Origins ==
Godolphin was the eldest son of Sir William Godolphin (1567–1613) and Thomasine Sidney (1581–24 April 1612) and brother of the poet Sidney Godolphin, both of whom were also members of Parliament. He succeeded his father in 1613, inheriting estates which included the lease of the Scilly Isles.

== Career ==
He represented Helston in the Parliament of 1625–6, again in the Long Parliament and was appointed High Sheriff of Cornwall in 1638.

As he was a Royalist, when the Civil War broke out, he returned to Cornwall, where he secured the Scilly Isles for the King and raised a regiment of which his brother, William, took command. In consequence, he was disbarred from sitting in Parliament in January 1644, and his estates were sequestered. However, after the capture of the King he negotiated an honourable capitulation of the Scilly Isles to Parliament, with the House of Commons voting "that Mr Godolphin, governor of Scilly, upon his surrender of that island, with all forts &c, should enjoy his estate and be free from arrest for any acts of war".

Godolphin arms, Gules, an eagle with two heads, displayed between three fleurs-de-lys, two and one, argent

He was elected once more for Helston in the Convention Parliament of 1660, and following the Restoration he was knighted at Charles II's coronation. He died in 1667.

== Marriage ==
Sir Francis married Dorothy Berkeley, daughter of Sir Henry Berkeley of Yarlington in Somerset, MP for Ilchester, with whom he had numerous children, including:

- Sir William Godolphin, 1st Baronet (c. 1640 – 1710), eldest son and heir, member of parliament for Helston from 1665 to 1679, created a baronet in 1661.
- Francis Godolphin (died 1675), auditor of the imprests.
- Sidney Godolphin, 1st Earl of Godolphin (1645–1712), First Lord of the Treasury and Secretary of State, who was also a Member of Parliament for Helston and St Mawes, created a peer in 1684 and Earl of Godolphin in 1706.
- Dr Henry Godolphin, Dean of St Paul's and Provost of Eton College.
- Charles Godolphin (c. 1651 – 1720), member of parliament for Helston from 1681 to 1701.
- Elizabeth Godolphin (died 30 August 1707), eldest daughter, second wife of Sir Arthur Northcote, 2nd Baronet (1628–1688), of Hayne, Newton St Cyres and King's Nympton Park, King's Nympton, Devon. She was the mother of the 3rd and 4th Baronets and founding mother of the Earls of Iddesleigh. The stone ledger with an inscription to her husband and herself exists in King's Nympton Church, where both were buried.
- Ursula Godolphin (born 1643), second daughter, who married John Crudge, with whom she had a son William Crudge (c. 1660 – c. 1720)
- Jael Godolphin, third daughter, who married Edward Boscawen (1628–1685) of Cornwall, MP.

== Ancestry ==
Ancestors of Francis Godolphin (1605–1667)

16. Sir William Godolphin
8. Thomas Godolphin
17. Margaret Glynn
4. Sir Francis Godolphin
9. Katherine Bonithon
2. Sir William Godolphin
5. Margaret Killigrew
1. Sir Francis Godolphin
3. Thomasine Sidney

Parliament of England
Preceded by Francis Carew; Thomas Carew	Member of Parliament for Helston; 1625–1626; With: Francis Carew	Succeeded by Sidney Godolphin; William Noy
Preceded by Sidney Godolphin; William Godolphin	Member of Parliament for Helston; 1640–1644; With: Sidney Godolphin 1640–1643; Second seat vacant 1643–1644	Succeeded by John Penrose; John Thomas
Preceded by Anthony Rous; Alexander Penhellick	Member of Parliament for Helston; 1660–1661; With: Thomas Robinson	Succeeded by Thomas Robinson; Sir Peter Killigrew
Honorary titles
Preceded by Sidney Godolphin	Governor of the Isles of Scilly; 1643–1667	Succeeded by Sidney Godolphin
