= Sir Bevil Grenville's Monument =

Monument in Lansdown, Bath, UK

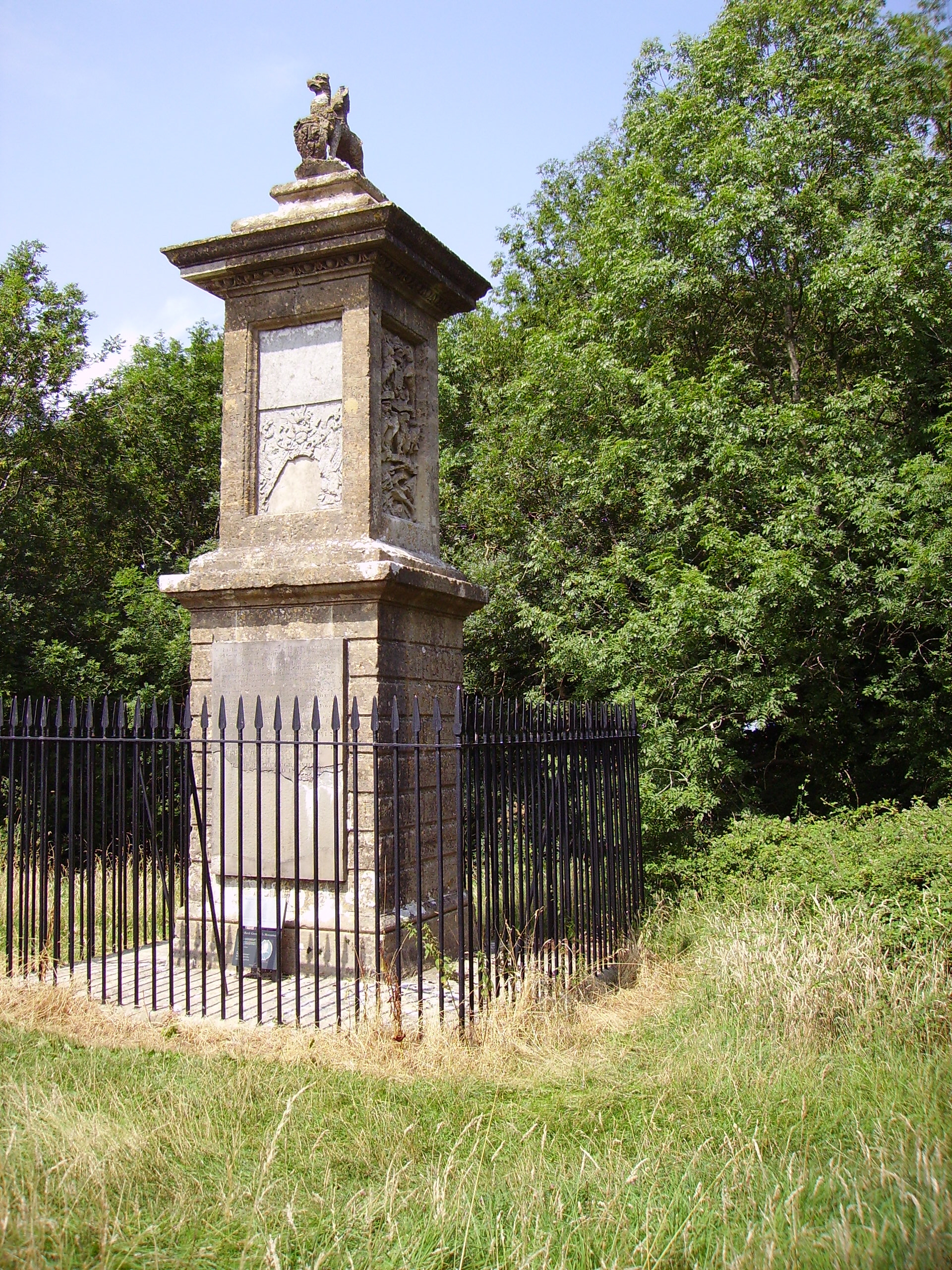
- Sir Bevil Grenville's monument, at the place where on 5 July 1643 he fell mortally wounded

- Location within Somerset
- 51°25′53″N 2°23′58″W
- Location: Lansdown Hill, near Bath, England

History
- Built: 1720

Listed Building – Grade II*
- Official name: Monument to Sir Bevil Grenville at NGR ST 7219 7034
- Designated: 1 February 1956
- Reference no.: 1214434

Scheduled monument
- Official name: Sir Bevil Grenville's Monument
- Designated: 12 December 1950
- Reference no.: 1015110

Sir Bevil Grenville's Monument is a monument erected in 1720 on Lansdown Hill, then called Lansdowne Hill, in Charlcombe parish about 4 miles (6.4 km) north-west of the city of Bath, in Somerset, England. It was designated a Grade II* listed structure in 1956, and a scheduled monument in 1950.

The monument commemorates the heroism of the Civil War Royalist commander Sir Bevil Grenville (1596–1643) of Stowe, Kilkhampton in Cornwall and Bideford in Devon, who on 5 July 1643 fell mortally wounded at the Battle of Lansdowne, leading his regiment of Cornish pikemen. It was erected by Grenville's grandson and has been maintained by his descendants. This has included the repair of inscriptions carved on the base of the monument, eulogising Grenville and his forces.

== Background ==
The Battle of Lansdowne took place on 5 July 1643 during the Civil War. The Royalists under Lord Hopton attacked the Parliamentarians led by Sir William Waller who occupied a commanding position on Lansdowne Hill. Under the leadership of Sir Bevil Grenville, Hopton's Cornish pikemen stormed Waller's breastworks, while Royalist musketeers outflanked Waller by passing through the woods on each side of his position. Grenville was mortally wounded in hand-to-hand combat as Parliamentarian horse counter-attacked and were driven off. He received a mortal blow to the head with a pollaxe and was taken to the rectory at nearby Cold Ashton where he died.

== History ==
The monument was erected in 1720 by George Granville, 1st Baron Lansdowne (1666–1735), grandson of Sir Bevil and heir male to William Granville, 3rd Earl of Bath (d.1711), great-grandson of Sir Bevil and the last male in the senior line of the family. In 1714 Baron Lansdowne had erected a mural monument to Sir Bevil in the Grenville Chapel in the Church of St James the Great, Kilkhampton, Cornwall, in which parish was situated the Grenville seat of Stowe.

The monument has been repaired several times, in 1777, 1828 and 1879, each time funded by Granville's descendants. Note that the original spelling was Bevil Granville but today Grenville or Greville are commonly used.

== Description ==
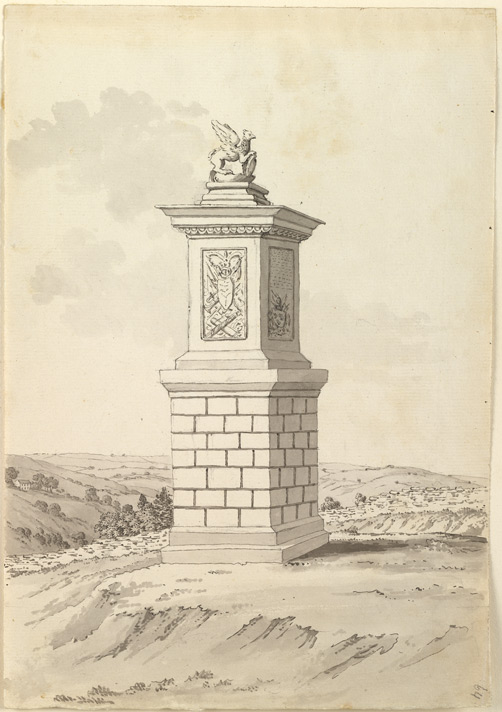
1783 Drawing by Samuel Hieronymus Grimm, British Library, Add. MS 15547, f.64

The monument is of ashlar stone masonry, 25 feet (7.6 m) high, in the English Baroque style. On the south side is a slate tablet inscribed with a quotation from the account by Lord Clarendon (1609–1674) in his History of the Rebellion and Civil Wars in England of the Battle of Lansdowne (1643). On the north side are two poems. On top is a griffin (the crest and supporters of the Grenvilles) holding an escutcheon displaying the Grenville coat of arms: Gules, three clarions or. On another side are shown the Royal Arms of King Charles II (1660–1685) supported by the arms of Sir Bevil's eldest son and heir John Granville, 1st Earl of Bath (1628–1701) and by the arms of the latter's half first cousin General George Monck, 1st Duke of Albemarle, KG (1608–1670). Monck was the principal figure behind the Restoration of the Monarchy to King Charles II in 1660, in effecting which he was much assisted by Sir John Grenville, for which services both were elevated to the peerage.

== Inscription ==
The Elegy on Sir Bevil Grenville by William Cartwright, a fellow Royalist, who died shortly after Sir Bevil on 29 November 1643, is inscribed on the monument:

This was not Nature’s courage nor that thing,
We valour call which Time and Reason bring,
But a diviner fury fierce and high,
Valour transported into Ecstasy.

== Bibliography ==
- Barratt, John (2005). The civil war in the south west. Bernsley: Pen & Sword Military. ISBN 1-84415-146-8.
- Chisholm, Hugh (1911). "Grenville, Sir Bevil" . In Chisholm, Hugh (ed.). Encyclopædia Britannica. Vol. 12 (11th ed.). Cambridge University Press. p. 580; last sentence. "A monument to him has been erected on the field of Lansdown"
- Round, J. Horace (1930). "The Granvilles and the Monks". In Page, William (ed.). Family Origins And Other Studies. Constable & Co.
