= Bernard Grenville =

English politician (1567 – 1636)

Arms of Grenville: Gules, three clarions or

Sir Bernard Grenville (1567 – 16 June 1636) was an English politician.

== Origins ==
He was the eldest surviving son of Richard Grenville (d. 1591), lord of the manors of Bideford in Devon and of Stowe in the parish of Kilkhampton, Cornwall and of Buckland Abbey, Devon, whom he succeeded in 1591 when he was lost on the Revenge.

He studied at King's College, Cambridge where he matriculated in Michaelmas term 1584.

== Career ==
Grenville came into the main family estates by a deed of 1586 and an indenture of 6 February 1591.

He was knighted in 1608.

He was appointed High Sheriff of Cornwall for 1596–97, and a justice of the peace and a deputy lieutenant of Cornwall in 1598. He was a Gentleman of the Privy Chamber to King Charles I in 1628. He was elected a member of parliament for Bodmin, Cornwall, in 1597.

== Marriage and children ==
He married Elizabeth Bevill, only daughter and heiress of Phillip Bevill of Brinn and Killigarth, by whom he had four sons and a daughter, including:

- Sir Bevil Grenville (1596–1643), a Royalist soldier in the Civil War; killed in action at the Battle of Lansdowne in 1643. He served as MP for Cornwall in 1621–1625 and 1640–1642, and for Launceston in 1625–1629 and 1640. He was the father of John Grenville, 1st Earl of Bath (1628–1701).
- Sir Richard Grenville, 1st Baronet (1600–1658)

He died on 16 June 1636, probably at Tremeer, and was buried on 26 June at St James the Great church, Kilkhampton, Cornwall.
