= John Trevanion =

English politician and royalist officer

John Trevanion (1613–1643) was an English politician who sat in the House of Commons of England from 1640 to 1643. He was a royalist officer who was killed in action in the English Civil War.

Trevanion was the son of Charles Trevanion of Caerhayes in Cornwall and his wife Amia Mallet.

Trevanion was a Member of Parliament, representing the Cornish boroughs of Grampound in the Short Parliament in 1640 and Lostwithiel in the Long Parliament from 1640 until his death in action at the siege of Bristol.

A seventeenth-century ode relating to four Cornish commanders included the distich:

Gone the four wheels of Charles's wain,
Grenville, Godolphin, Slanning, Trevanion slain

They did not all fall at the same time, nor in the same place, but all four were killed in the year 1643. Slanning and Trevanion were slain at the siege of Bristol; Sir Bevil Grenville fell at the Battle of Lansdowne near Bath, where an obelisk has been erected to his memory; and Sir Sidney Godolphin was shot in the porch of the Globe lnn at Chagford in Devon.

Trevanion married Mary Arundell, youngest daughter of Royalist John Arundell of Trerice, and sister of Richard Arundell, 1st Baron Arundell of Trerice and had a son Charles, who was successor to his grandfather.

== See also ==
- Cornwall in the English Civil War

Parliament of England
Vacant Parliament suspended since 1629	Member of Parliament for Grampound; 1640 (April); With: William Coryton	Succeeded by William Coryton; James Campbell
Preceded by Nicholas Kendall; Richard Arundell	Member of Parliament for Lostwithiel; 1640–1643; With: Richard Arundell	Succeeded by John Maynard; Francis Holles
