= Francis Godolphin (1540–1608) =

English politician and knight

Sir Francis Godolphin
- Born: 1540
- Died: 1608 (aged 67–68)
- Occupations: Politician and Knight
- Title: Sir
- Spouses: Margaret Killigrew; Alice Skerret
- Children: 3 (including Sir William Godolphin (1567–1613) and Sir Francis Godolphin (died 1640))
- Parent(s): Thomas Godolphin; Katherine Bonithon
- Relatives: Sir William Godolphin (grandfather); Sir William Godolphin (1515–1570) (uncle)

Sir Francis Godolphin (1540–1608) was an English politician, knight, and Member of Parliament.

== Life ==
The nephew of Sir William Godolphin (1515–1570), who left no male issue, he succeeded to his uncle's estates early in Queen Elizabeth's reign. He was one of the leading citizens of Cornwall, described by that county's 17th-century historian, Richard Carew, as one "whose zeal in religion, uprightness in justice, providence in government, and plentiful housekeeping, have won him a very great and reverent reputation in his country". (The Survey of Cornwall, 1602, quoted in Burke's Extinct Peerage).

His father, Thomas, had been Governor of the Scilly Isles and they were leased to Francis who became governor in his turn (see Governors of Scilly). On royal instructions, he improved the defences of the islands which were, in Carew's words "reduced to a more defensible plight by him, who with his invention and purse, bettered his plot and allowance, and therein so tempered strength and delight, and both with use, as it serveth for a sure hold, and a commodious dwelling".

Chief among this work of fortification was the building of Star Castle. He was also an innovative manager of Cornwall's tin mines, his inventions greatly increasing their productivity by extracting metal from material; that would previously have been discarded as refuse, so materially improving both the prosperity of Cornwall and the revenue that the Crown derived from it.

Sir Francis represented Cornwall in the Parliament of 1588–9 and Lostwithiel in that of 1593; he was also twice High Sheriff of Cornwall (1580 and 1604), Custos Rotulorum for a number of years, and Vice-Warden of the Stannaries from 1584 to 1603.

== Family ==
Godolphin arms, Gules, an eagle with two heads, displayed between three fleurs-de-lys, two and one, argent

Godolphin married Margaret Killigrew, daughter of Sir John Killigrew of Arwennack and the notorious pirate Mary Wolverston; and two of his sons, Sir William Godolphin (1567–1613) (his heir) and Sir Francis Godolphin (died 1640), followed him in becoming members of parliament. His daughter Thomasine married George Carew.

As a widower he married Alice Skerret (1545–1632) of Tavistock, Devon widow of Sir John Glanville (1542–1600)

== In fiction ==
In the historical novel The Grove of Eagles, by Winston Graham, Godolphin is shown as a sympathetic figure. The main characters are the family of his first wife, the Killigrews: both out of family feeling and his concern for law and order, Godolphin warns them that their reputation for piracy and their general lawlessness will lead them into ruin.

== Ancestry ==
Ancestors of Francis Godolphin (1540–1608)

16. Sir John Godolphin
8. Sir John Godolphin
17. Lady Elizabeth Killigrew
4. Sir William Godolphin
9. Margaret Trenouth
2. Thomas Godolphin
5. Margaret Glynn
1. Sir Francis Godolphin
3. Katherine Bonithon

Political offices
Preceded by William Lower	High Sheriff of Cornwall; 1580	Succeeded by John Arundell
Preceded by Anthony Rous	High Sheriff of Cornwall; 1604	Succeeded by Nicholas Prideaux
Preceded by Peter Edgcumbe	Custos Rotulorum of Cornwall; 1597–1606	Succeeded by The Earl of Pembroke
Preceded by The Earl of Bedford	Lord Lieutenant of Cornwall jointly with Richard Carew, Sir William Mohun, and Peter Edgcumbe; 1586–1587	Succeeded by Sir Walter Raleigh
Parliament of England
Preceded by Peter Edgcumbe; Sir William Mohun	Member of Parliament for Cornwall; 1588–1589; With: Peter Edgcumbe	Succeeded by Peter Edgcumbe; William Bevil
Preceded by William Fitzwilliams; William Gardiner	Member of Parliament for Lostwithiel; 1593; With: John Beal	Succeeded by William Cornwallis; John Cooke
Honorary titles
Preceded by (newly established)	Governor of the Isles of Scilly; 1568–1608	Succeeded by William Godolphin
