= Charles Trevanion =

English politician (c. 1594 – c. 1660)

Sir Charles Trevanion JP
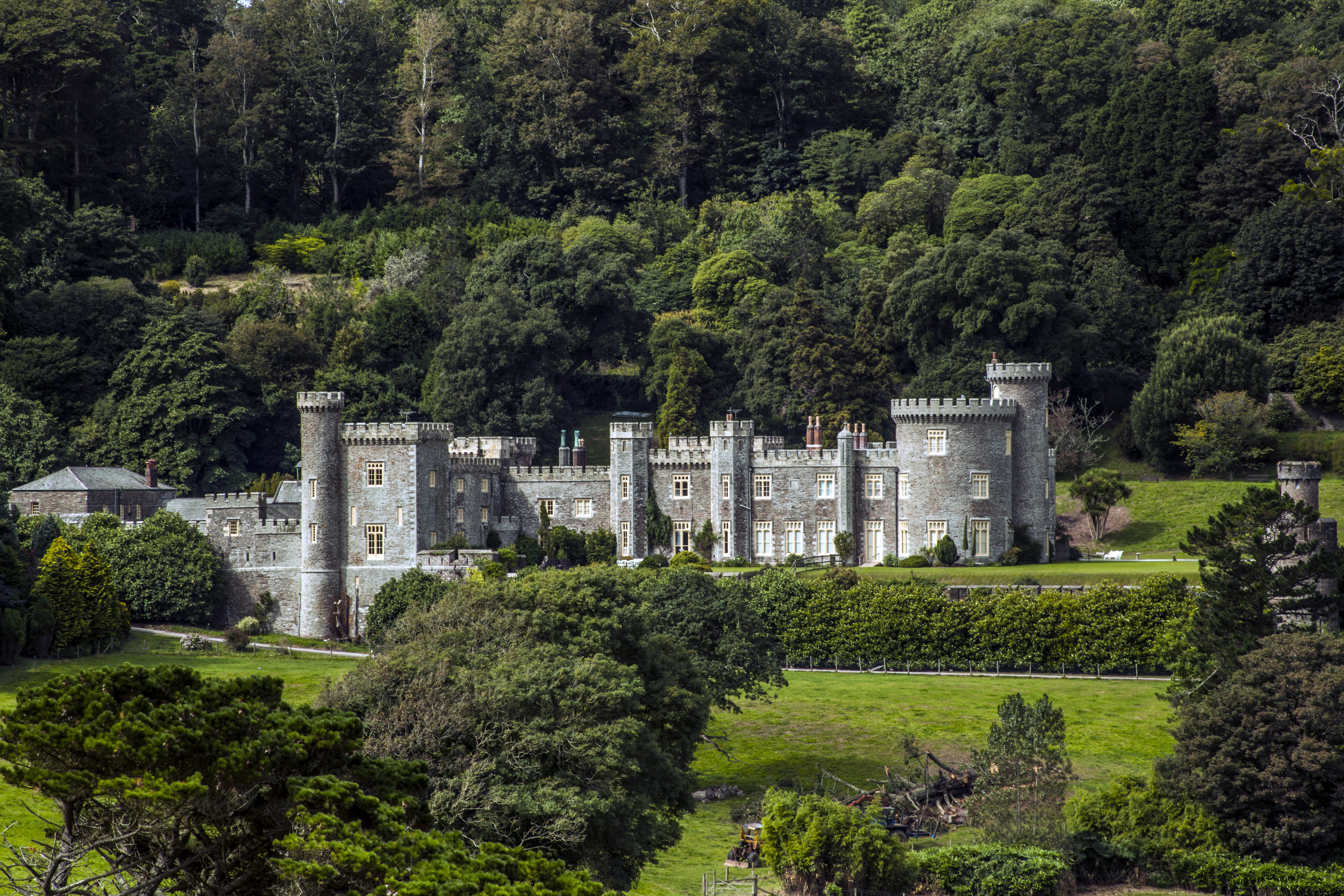
- Family home at Caerhays Castle (rebuilt in 18th century)

Royalist Vice Admiral of South Cornwall
- In office 1643–1645

High Sheriff of Cornwall
- In office November 1633 – November 1634

Member of Parliament for Cornwall
- In office June 1625 – August 1625

Personal details
- Born: 1594 Caerhays Castle, Cornwall
- Died: 1 July 1660 (aged 66) Bristol
- Resting place: Church of St Michael Caerhays
- Spouse: Amy Malet (1612–his death)
- Children: John Trevanion (1613–1643)
- Education: Oriel College, Oxford
- Occupation: Landowner and politician

Military service
- Years of service: 1642 to 1646
- Rank: Colonel
- Battles/wars: First English Civil War; Siege of Plymouth; Battle of Torrington

Charles Trevanion (c. 1594 – c. 1660) was an English landowner and politician, who was MP for Cornwall in 1625 and Sheriff from 1633 to 1634. He supported the Royalist cause during the First English Civil War, during which his eldest son John Trevanion was killed.

== Personal details ==
Charles Trevanion was born around 1594, eldest son of Charles Trevanion (died 1601) of Caerhays Castle and his wife Joan Wichalse (c. 1568–1598). One of the largest landowners in Cornwall, his father controlled several seats in Parliament, served as Vice-Admiral of Cornwall and was High Sheriff of Cornwall in 1596. When he died in 1601, Trevanion inherited nearly 8,000 acres of land around the village of St Michael Caerhays.

Sometime before 1613, he married Amia Mallet, daughter of Sir John Mallet of Enmore; they had two sons and a daughter, including John Trevanion (1613–1643), who was killed at the Storming of Bristol.

== Career ==
Trevanion attended Oriel College, Oxford in 1611 and became a local Justice of the Peace in 1617. Elected for Cornwall in 1625, he did not stand again but his extensive estates gave him influence over the Parliamentary seats of Grampound, Tregony and St Mawes. This made him a substantial player in Cornish politics for the next thirty years.

Although Trevanion supported Parliament against Charles I in the 1628 debate over the Petition of Right, in May 1641 his son John was one of 59 MPs named as "betrayers of their country" for voting against the Bill of Attainder for Strafford. When the First English Civil War began in August 1642, like most of the Cornish gentry Trevanion remained loyal to the king, and the West Country was a Royalist stronghold throughout the war.

In August 1643, he succeeded Sir Nicholas Slanning as Vice Admiral of South Cornwall, after the latter was killed along with his son John during the Storming of Bristol. This was a largely nominal post, since the Parliamentarian navy dominated the sea lanes, but Trevanion also raised an infantry regiment. Between 1643 and 1645, this unit took part in the Siege of Plymouth and fought at the Battle of Torrington in February 1646. It surrendered along with the remnants of the Royalist army in the West shortly afterwards.

During the 1648 Second English Civil War, Trevanion was suspected of involvement in an abortive Royalist rising in Cornwall, and briefly arrested in 1650. He retained considerable local influence and regained control of his estates in 1651, where he lived quietly until dying sometime between 1654 and 1660. The exact date is unknown, as no will or similar legal document survives.

== Sources ==
- Burke, John (1833). A Genealogical and Heraldic History of the Commoners of Great Britain and Ireland, Enjoying Territorial Possessions Or High Official Rank: But Uninvested with Heritable Honours; Volume I. Henry Colburn.
- Duffin, Anne; Hunneyball, Paul (2010). TREVANION, Charles (c.1594-by 1660), of Caerhayes, Cornw. in The History of Parliament: the House of Commons 1604-1629. CUP.
- Rushworth, John (1721). Historical Collections of Private Passages of State: Volume 4, May 1641. Browne & Son.

Parliament of England
Preceded by Bevil Grenville; William Coryton	Member of Parliament for Cornwall; 1625; With: Robert Killigrew	Succeeded by Sir Francis Godolphin; William Coryton
