= Francis Godolphin (died about 1640) =

English nobleman, politician, knight and Member of Parliament

Sir Francis Godolphin MP
- Godolphin arms, Gules, an eagle with two heads, displayed between three fleurs-de-lys, two and one, argent
- Died: 2 May 1640
- Occupations: Politician and Knight
- Title: Sir
- Parent(s): Sir Francis Godolphin (1540–1608); Margaret Killigrew

Sir Francis Godolphin MP (died 1640) was an English nobleman, politician, knight, and Member of Parliament.

== Biography ==
Godolphin was the third son of Sir Francis Godolphin (1540–1608) and his first wife Margaret Killigrew. He represented St. Ives in the Parliaments of 1624–5 and 1625, and Cornwall in that of 1626. He was also Recorder of Helston in 1620. He was still alive in 1637, and his will was proved on 2 May 1640.

== Notes ==
Parliament of England
Preceded by Lord St John; Robert Bacon	Member of Parliament for St Ives; 1624–1625; With: William Lake 1624–1625; Sir William Parkhurst 1625	Succeeded by Edward Savage; Benjamin Tichborne
Preceded by Sir Robert Killigrew; Charles Trevanion	Member of Parliament for Cornwall; 1626; With: William Coryton	Succeeded by William Coryton; Sir John Eliot
