= William Godolphin (1515–1570) =

Kingdom of England politician

Sir William Godolphin MP
- Born: 1515
- Died: 1570 (aged 54–55)
- Occupations: Soldier, Knight, Politician
- Title: Sir
- Spouse: Blanch Langdon
- Children: 3 daughters
- Parent(s): Sir William Godolphin; Margaret Glynn
- Relatives: Thomas Godolphin (younger brother); Sir Francis Godolphin (1540–1608) (nephew)

Sir William Godolphin MP (1515–1570) was a 16th-century English soldier, knight, politician, and Member of Parliament (MP), whose career has been so confused with that of his father and namesake Sir William Godolphin that it is sometimes difficult to be sure which of the two held which offices.

The father was Member for Cornwall and High Sheriff during the reign of Henry VIII; the son worked closely with Thomas Cromwell as a young man, and with the help of Cromwell's support was elected MP for Cornwall in 1539.

Godolphin arms, Gules, an eagle with two heads, displayed between three fleurs-de-lys, two and one, argent

After Cromwell's fall, the younger Godolphin acquired a considerable military reputation. He seems to have been drafted into the army command as an engineer, drawing on his knowledge of tin mining (which was the main source of his family's income in Cornwall). His most important contribution was at the Siege of Boulogne.

Richard Carew in his Survey of Cornwall saying of him "He demeaned himself very valiantly beyond seas, as appeared by the scars he brought home, no less to the beautifying of his fame, than the disfiguring of his face". After the capture of Boulogne, he was made its bailiff in recognition of the part he played in the victory, and also knighted.

He was a member of the Council of Regency from 1547 to 1551, High Sheriff of Cornwall in 1549–50 and 1568–9, and its MP once more in 1553. He was also a Vice-Warden of Stannaries, and Custos Rotulorum of Cornwall from 1562 until his death in 1570.

Sir William married Blanch Langdon and had three daughters, but leaving no male issue his estates passed to his nephew, Sir Francis Godolphin (1540–1608).
