= Cold Ashton =

Village in Gloucestershire, England

Coordinates: 51.452°N 02.362°W

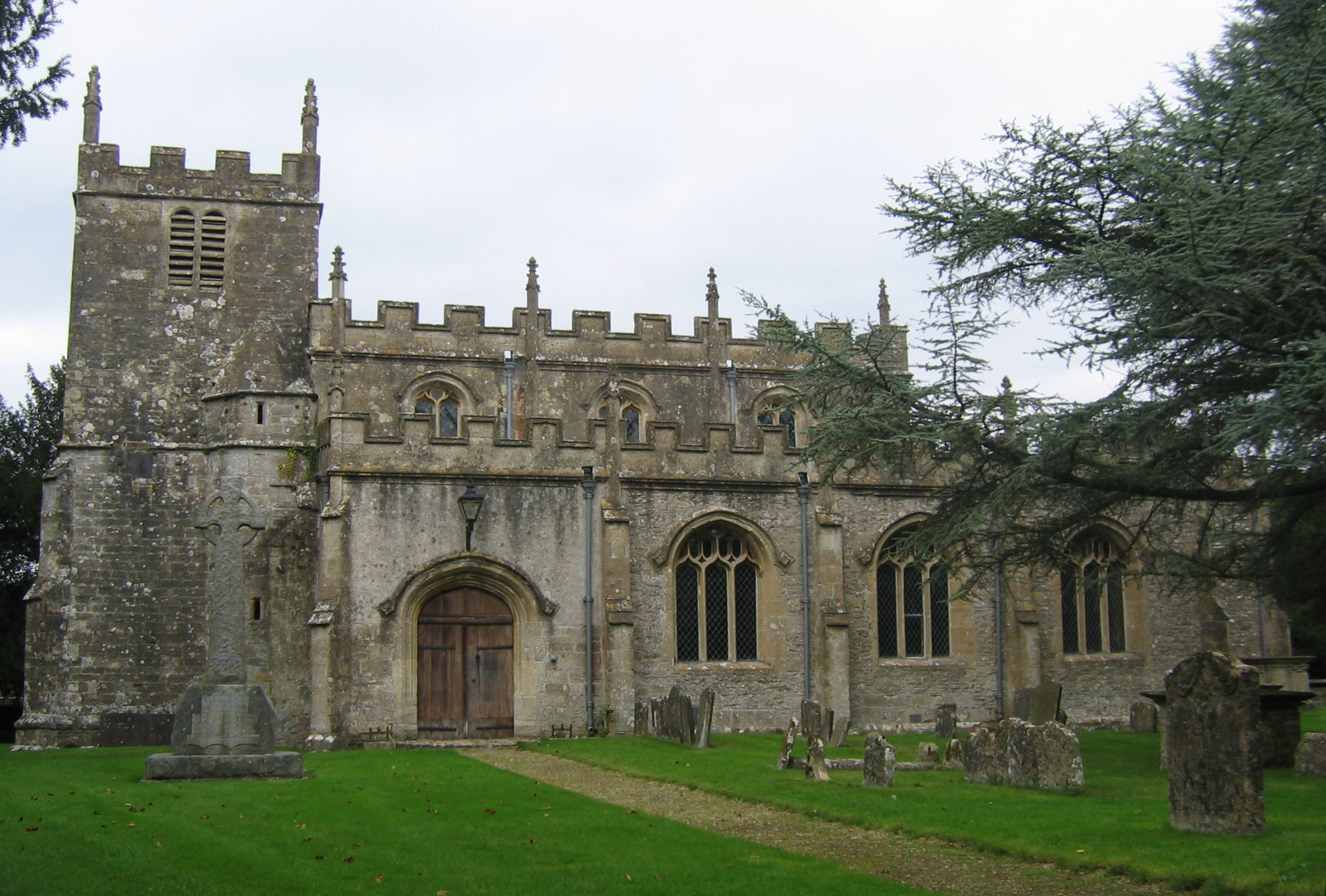
- Holy Trinity church

- Location within Gloucestershire
- Population: 221 (Neighbourhood Statistics 2011)
- OS grid reference: ST747725
- Civil parish: Cold Ashton
- Unitary authority: South Gloucestershire
- Ceremonial county: Gloucestershire
- Region: South West
- Country: England
- Sovereign state: United Kingdom
- Post town: CHIPPENHAM
- Postcode district: SN14
- Dialling code: 01225
- Police: Avon and Somerset
- Fire: Avon
- Ambulance: South Western

Cold Ashton is a village in South Gloucestershire, England. It is located 5 miles (8.0 km) north of Bath, near the junction between the A46 and A420 roads. The village church has a 14th-century tower and the rest of the church was rebuilt in the 16th century by Thomas Key, its rector. It had a population of 221 according to the 2011 census.

In the 1870s, Cold Ashton was described as

A parish in Chipping-Sodbury district, Gloucester; on the verge of the county, under the Cotswolds, 5¾ miles N of Bath r. station. It includes the village of Pennsylvania; and its Post Town is Marshfield under Chippenham. Acres, 2,300.

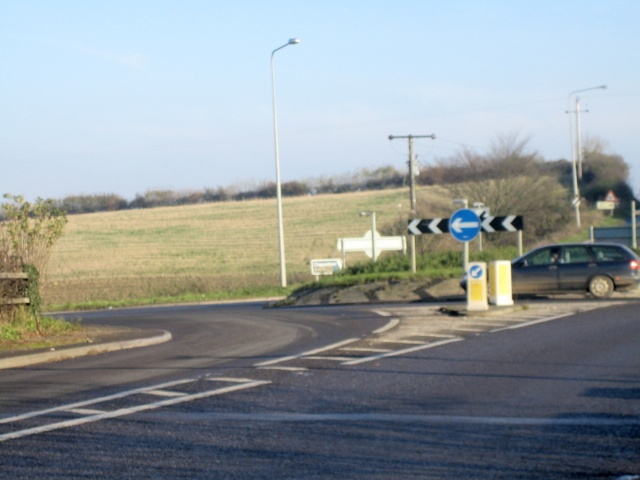
Roundabout linking the A46 and A420

Now, Cold Ashton is described as

A small village which, due to its setting, exhibits an air of tranquillity and pleasant isolation. The stone-walled main street together with the close alignment of the manor house, the Old Rectory and the courthouse, give the village an intimate character.

== History ==
Originally the property of Bath Abbey, Cold Ashton then became entirely owned by William Pepwall, Mayor of Bristol, following the Dissolution of the Monasteries in 1564. Following this acquisition, buildings such as the Elizabethan Manor House containing Renaissance style features, the Old Rectory and the Holy Trinity Church were constructed. It is debated who had this influence, however, with dating referring more-so to the later Mayor of Bristol John Gunning.

Looking at Holy Trinity Church in greater detail, it is described how

The Holy Trinity Church originally came under the Priory of St Peter in Bath and was largely rebuilt between 1508 and 1540 by the rector, Thomas Key. His rebus, a 'T' entwined in a key can be found embellishing the church and other interesting features include the remains of a rood loft and a curious pulpit set in a niche in the north wall.

In 1643 during the English Civil War Sir Bevil Grenville was injured at the Battle of Lansdowne and carried to the Old Rectory at Cold Ashton, where he died.

=== Domesday Book ===
The Domesday Book was a "Great Survey" completed in 1086 used largely in order to determine taxes to be owed as well as holdings and values of people. As such, very brief, listed descriptions were given to settlements such as Cold Ashton.

Such insights relate to the population as of 1086, saying "Total population: 8 households (quite small)." There is also some description of the village's tax, saying "Taxable units: Taxable value 5 exemption units. Taxed on 3.0." There is also some description of the village's resources, saying "Ploughland: 1 lord's plough team's. 3 men's plough teams. Other resources: Meadow 6 acres. 1 mill, value 0.2."

=== Domesday Reloaded ===
The BBC's Domesday Reloaded, used to give a more updated look in 1986 of everyday life across UK following the original Domesday Book 900 years previous, was partaken within Cold Ashton. Such insights relate to the church, the village's ecology and the village's education facilities as of 1986, saying

There are fears about the future of the Church in Cold Ashton, which has difficulty in paying its Diocesan Quota. Not only the church goers want to keep the church, nearly all the residents want to see it maintained and used. There are about 30 on the electoral role and an average attendance of about 15.

The area lies upon a Cotswold escarpment known locally as the 'South Wolds'. The highest point on this upland reaches some 200 metres above sea level and falls away sharply to the South. Land mass is mainly limestone, used frequently in dry stone walling.

There are no schools in the area covered, the nearest being a Primary school in Marshfield, 2 miles away and Comprehensives at Sir Bernard Lovell, Oldland and Kingsfield, Warmley, 5 miles distant, for which school buses are provided.

== Population statistics (1801-2011) ==
=== Population change ===
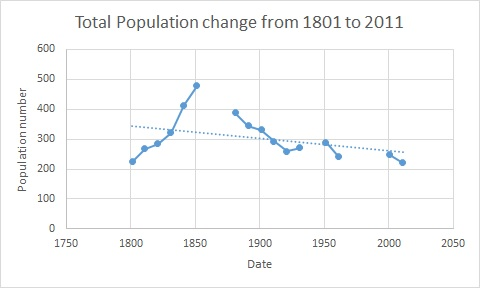
Total population of Cold Ashton civil parish, Gloucestershire, as reported by the Census of Population from 1801 to 2011.

The time series shows how, from 1801 to 1851, Cold Ashton grew in total population size by over double to nearly five hundred. After then, however, the graph highlights how after almost every ten-year period there has been a fall in total population. This has resulted in population density falling to 0.2 (number of persons per hectare) as of 2011, much lower than the South Gloucestershire average of 5.3 and national average of 4.1.

=== Economic activity ===
Unemployment in Cold Ashton as of 2011 is at 1.2%, which compares favorably with elsewhere. It's less than half the South Gloucestershire average of 2.8% and less than a third of the national average of 4.4%. This is largely because of much higher levels on self-employment at 32.0%, compared to the county's 8.9% average and 9.8% national average. This makes up for the lack of full-time employment, of which is 29.1% compared to the county's 42.9% average and 38.6% national average.

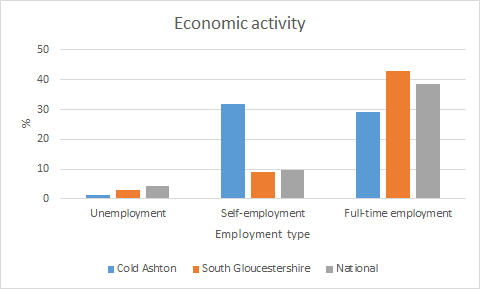
Economic activity in Cold Ashton, South Gloucestershire and nationwide, as reported by the Census of Population in 2011

=== Health ===
Levels of very good health in Cold Ashton as of 2011 compare well with county and national levels, being 52.9%, 49.1% and 47.2% respectively. Levels of very bad health in Cold Ashton, however, compare badly with county and national levels, being 1.8%, 0.9% and 1.2% respectively.

=== Occupational data ===
Occupational data of Cold Ashton in 1881 highlights how - based on occupations that have been identified - the greatest sector for employment was agriculture with 80 workers, with domestic service or offices behind that with 23 workers. Professionals, workers in dress and workers in various vegetable substances all only have 1 worker. It can also be noted how a large number of women workers have their occupation as unknown.

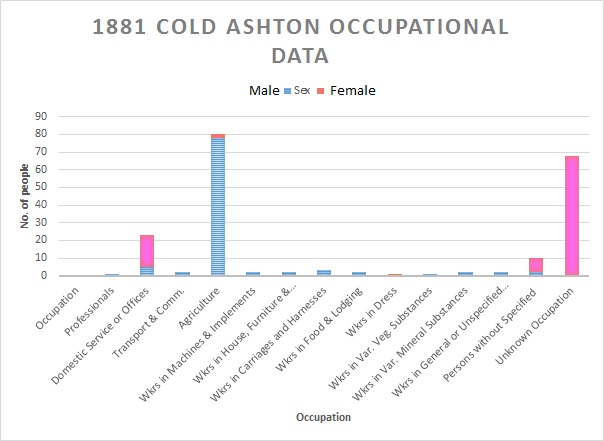
Occupational data of Cold Ashton as of 1881, as shown by Vision of Britain.

== Tourism ==
Cold Ashton is located near to the end of the Cotswold Way if starting the walk from Chipping Campden, or near the beginning if starting the walk from Bath. It is one of the suggested stopping points on the walk, and as such offers two bed and breakfasts in the form of Laburnum Cottage and Whiteways Bed and Breakfast.

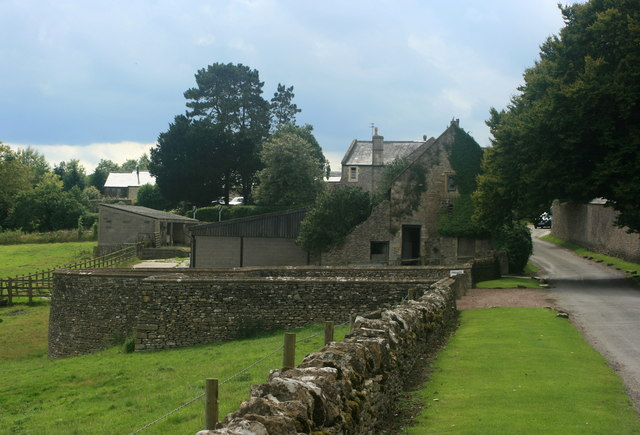
Hyde's Lane, part of the Cotswold Way

The village has no shop, but it is within walking distance of the garage in Pennsylvania.
