= Penstowe Castle =

Castle in Cornwall, England

- Kastel Kylgh (Cornish)
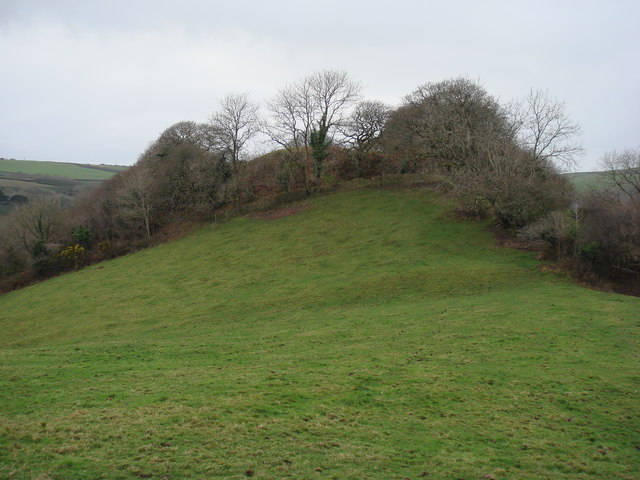
- Interactive map of Penstowe Castle
- 50.87694°N 4.49931°W
- Location: Kilkhampton, Cornwall
- OS grid reference: SS2426511581

Scheduled monument
- Official name: Motte and bailey castle 900m ESE of Burridge Farm
- Designated: 29 July 1957
- Reference no.: 1003079

Penstowe Castle, also called Kilkhampton Castle (Cornish: Kastel Kylgh), was a medieval fortification built near Kilkhampton, Cornwall, England, possibly during the years of the civil war in the 12th century known as the Anarchy.

== History ==
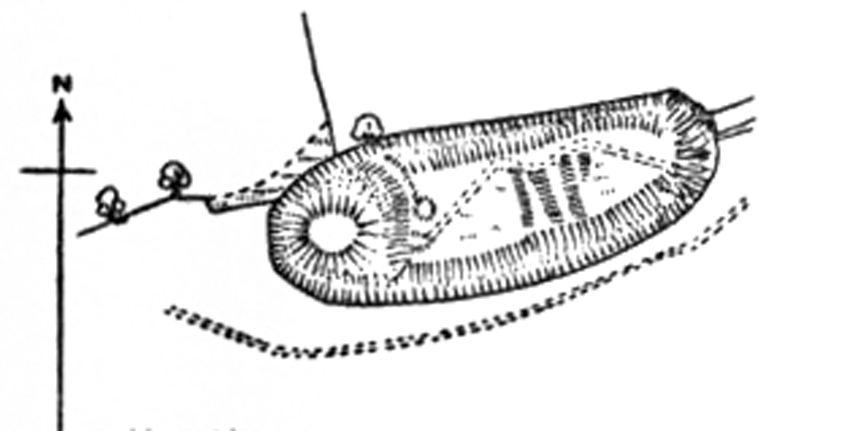
Plan of Penstowe Castle

The precise date of Penstowe Castle's construction is uncertain, but it was built during the years of the Anarchy in the mid-12th century, either by Robert, 1st Earl of Gloucester, feudal baron of Gloucester, who was certainly the tenant-in-chief of the manor of Kilkhampton, or by his tenants and relatives the Grenville family (possibly Sir Richard I de Grenville (d.post 1142) of Neath Castle, Glamorgan), which held the manor of Kilkhampton and the manor of Bideford in Devon from the Honour of Gloucester. Stowe House was the Grenvilles' residence at Kilkhampton, demolished and rebuilt in grand form in 1679 by John Granville, 1st Earl of Bath (1628-1701).

Kilkhampton Castle was built to a motte and bailey design, positioned on a knoll and protected by steep slopes on the north and south sides. The motte today is shaped as an oval, 18 metres (59 ft) by 8 metres (26 ft) across and between 6 metres (20 ft) and 9 metres (30 ft) high; the inner bailey is 30 metres (98 ft) by 25 metres (82 ft), and the outer bailey is 24 metres (79 ft) by 20 metres (66 ft). The configuration of baileys is unusual, although similar to nearby Eastleigh Berries Castle. A D-shaped building was located on top of the motte.

Archaeological excavations were carried out in 1925 and in the early 1950s. In the 21st century the site is protected under law as a scheduled monument.

== See also ==
- Castles in Great Britain and Ireland
- List of castles in England
