= Storming of Bristol =

1643 battle of the First English Civil War

- Part of the First English Civil War
- Storming of Bristol (after the painting by G. Cattermole, 1852)
Date	23 to 26 July 1643
Location	Bristol
Result	Royalist victory

Belligerents
Royalists	Parliamentarians

Commanders and leaders
Prince Rupert; Prince Maurice	Nathaniel Fiennes

Strength
4,500 horse 6,000 foot 20 guns	300 horse 1,500 foot 100 guns

Casualties and losses
500–600 killed	Unknown

The storming of Bristol took place from 23 to 26 July 1643, during the First English Civil War. The Royalist army under Prince Rupert captured the important port of Bristol from its weakened Parliamentarian garrison. The city remained under Royalist control until the second siege of Bristol in September 1645.

== Background ==
Western Campaign 1643

In the mid-17th century, Bristol was one of the most important and wealthy cities in England, second only to London. Although there were many Royalist sympathisers within the city, they failed to secure it when the war began, leaving it under Parliamentarian control. In July 1643, the city's garrison was weakened when 1,200 men were sent to reinforce Sir William Waller's Army of the Western Association, which was destroyed at the Battle of Roundway Down on 13 July. Realising that this presented the Royalists with a chance to seize Parliamentarian-held towns in the south-west, Prince Rupert marched from the wartime capital of Oxford, sending orders to the western Royalist army commanded by his brother Prince Maurice to attack the city from the south while he marched from the north.

== Defences ==
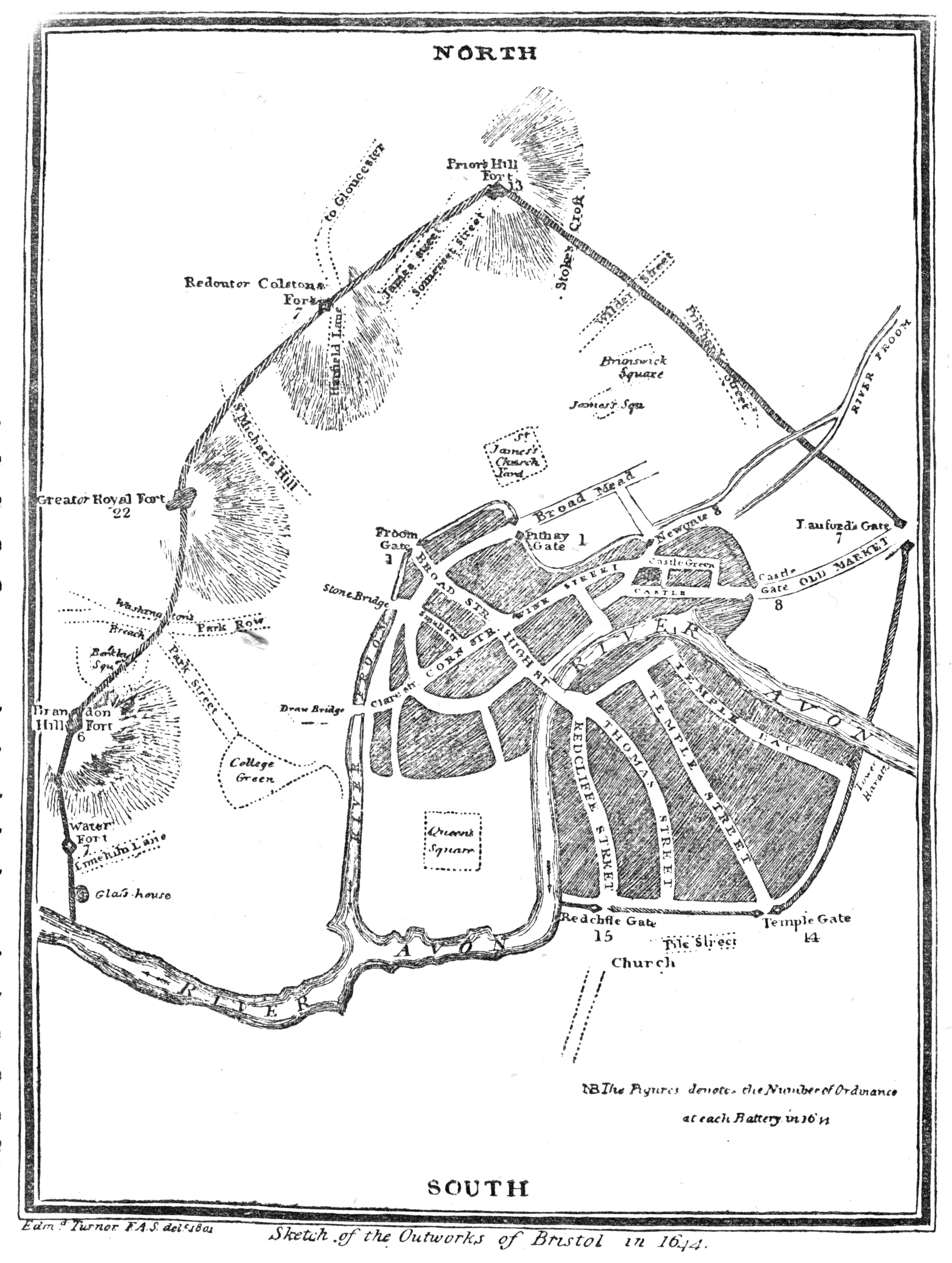
Map of Bristol's fortifications in 1644

The garrison under Colonel Nathaniel Fiennes consisted of 300 cavalry and 1,500 infantry, plus some poorly-armed town militia. The fortifications consisted of an inner wall immediately surrounding the city and resting on the Rivers Avon and Frome plus an outer five-mile circuit of walls and forts. To the south and east the outer wall was a continuous barrier consisting of a curtain wall and ditch on low-lying ground; to the north and west, the defences consisted of a chain of forts and batteries resting on the high ground overlooking the city, linked by a low earthwork. A total of 100 guns were distributed along the defences, mostly taken from ships in the harbour, but the loss of the troops sent to reinforce Waller left Fiennes unable to properly defend the long perimeter defences.

== Royalist plan ==
Prince Rupert personally led a reconnaissance of the defences to the north of the city on 23 July. There were some clashes between Royalist outposts on Clifton Hill and Parliamentarian sorties, which were beaten off.

After investing the city on the morning of 24 July, Rupert formally summoned the garrison to surrender, but when Fiennes refused he crossed the Avon to confer with Prince Maurice and his officers. The council was divided; since Prince Maurice and his Cornish infantry faced the stronger southern defences, they preferred to undertake a formal siege and bombardment. However, Rupert was conscious of the wider strategic issues; a series of Royalist successes and dissension within Parliament meant the West needed to be secured quickly to facilitate an offensive against London.

Rupert argued the northern defences were vulnerable given the weak state of the garrison, while a simultaneous assault from the south would prevent them being reinforced. His view eventually prevailed, and the attack was planned to begin early on 26 July. The signal would be a salvo from a Royalist battery facing the Prior's Hill Fort at the northern point of the defences.

== Attack ==
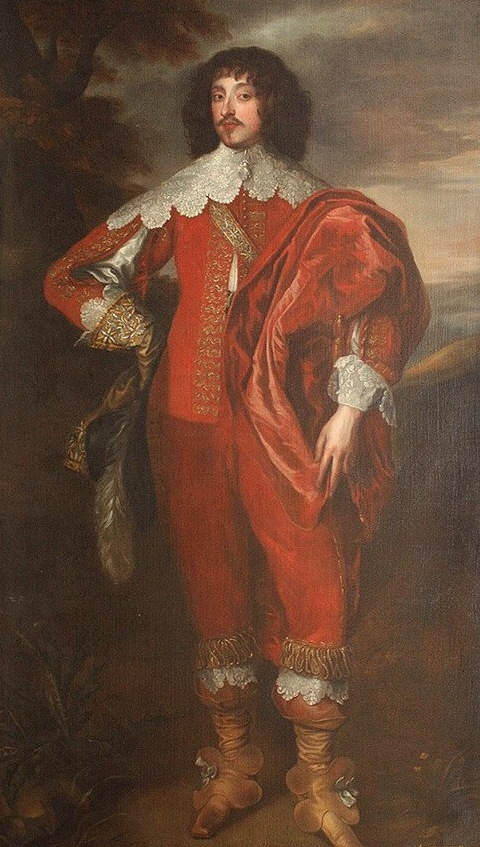
Viscount Grandison, who was killed in the assault on Prior Hill's fort

Unfortunately the Cornish attacked from the south prematurely at 3:00 am, forcing Rupert to begin the assault earlier than intended. Split into three columns, the Cornish rolled carts and wagons into the ditch in front of the wall to fill it and allow them to cross but the ditch was too deep and this approach failed. They then used faggots and scaling ladders to continue the attack but suffered heavy casualties. The three column commanders, Sir Nicholas Slanning, John Trevanion and Colonel Brutus Buck, were all killed and the Cornish eventually driven back.

The northern assault force consisted of three infantry brigades and some dragoons led by Colonel Henry Washington. The brigade commanded by Viscount Grandison attacked the Prior's Hill Fort and a nearby redoubt at Stokes Croft, but was repulsed and Grandison was killed. Sir John Belasyse's brigade was also unsuccessful at Colston's Mount and Prince Rupert had a horse killed under him while rallying Belasyse's infantry.

The third brigade under Colonel Henry Wentworth was more successful. Supported by Washington's dragoons, they penetrated a re-entrant between the Brandon Hill and Windmill Hill forts, into "dead ground" where they were protected from the fire of either fort. After throwing grenades over the wall to drive back the defenders, they pulled it down using halberds and partisans. Fiennes's cavalry tried to counter-attack but their horses flinched when faced with "fire-pikes", pikes to which fireworks were attached.

Wentworth's brigade pushed forward towards the inner defences, followed by Belasyse and Colonel Arthur Aston's regiment of cavalry. They captured another strongpoint, the "Essex Work", when the defenders panicked. There was severe fighting for two hours around the Frome Gate, part of the inner defences, as some of the townswomen tried to improvise a barricade of woolsacks behind the gate.

== Surrender and aftermath ==
Prince Rupert had sent for the Cornish infantry to reinforce the attack, but about 6 pm Fiennes asked for terms. Although granted the honours of war, which allowed them free passage to the nearest friendly territory and to retain their weapons and personal property, they were plundered by undisciplined Royalists when they marched out on 27 July.

Both sides suffered heavy casualties in the assault. Royalist statesman Clarendon later wrote "his Majesty’s loss was inestimable, and very hard to be repaired... there were slain...about five hundred common men and many excellent officers, whereof many were of prime command and quality". The loss of Slanning, Trevanion and Buck was especially significant, as the Cornish infantry were among the best troops in the Royalist army but reluctant to serve outside Cornwall or under "foreign" officers. With the death of the highly popular Sir Bevil Grenville at Lansdowne, many of their leaders were gone and they now returned home.

However, victory secured the second largest city in Britain and a landing point for reinforcements shipped from Ireland following the truce agreed in September with Confederate Ireland. In addition, Bristol's workshops eventually re-equipped the entire Royalist army with muskets, while they secured immense amounts of booty, including £100,000 of cash and war supplies. Eight armed merchant ships were captured, which later formed the nucleus of a Royalist fleet.

The capture of Bristol and Royalist success elsewhere meant by late August the Parliamentarian cause was close to collapse and was saved only by John Pym's leadership and determination. However, as was common for both sides throughout the war, success was followed by high rates of desertion as individuals took their loot home. The need to replace them prevented the Royalists from taking full advantage of their victory and delayed their attack on the main prize of London until late October.

Following the fall of the city, William Prynne accused Fiennes of cowardice, after which Fiennes was court-martialled and sentenced to death, given reprieve only after the intervention of the Lord-General of the parliamentarian forces, the Earl of Essex. The rapid surrender of Bristol by Prince Rupert to the New Model Army under Sir Thomas Fairfax in September 1645 vindicated his claims the city was far more vulnerable than was apparent. Fairfax's officers subsequently drew up a certificate exonerating Fiennes from all blame for capitulating in 1643.

== See also ==
- Siege of Bristol (1645)
- Fire lance

== Bibliography ==
- Dixon, William Hepworth (1852). Robert Blake, admiral and general at sea. London: Chapman and Hall.
- Firth, Charles Harding; Leslie, JH (1925). "The Siege and capture of Bristol by Royalist forces in 1643". Journal of the Society for Army Historical Research. 4 (18): 180–203. JSTOR 44227516.
- Gentles, Ian (1993). "Why Men Fought in the British Civil Wars, 1639-1652". The History Teacher. 26 (4): 407–418. doi:10.2307/494465. JSTOR 494465.
- Johnson, David (2012). Parliament in crisis; the disintegration of the Parliamentarian war effort during the summer of 1643 (PDF) (PHD). York University.
- Plant, David (1 November 2008). "Nathaniel Fiennes, 1610–69". BCW Project. David Plant.
- Plant, David (27 December 2009). "The Sieges of Bristol & Gloucester, 1643". BCW Project. David Plant.
- Rogers, Col. H.C.B. (1968). Battles and Generals of the Civil Wars, 1642-1651. Seeley Service & Co. Ltd.
- Royle, Trevor (2006) [2004]. Civil War: The Wars of the Three Kingdoms 1638–1660. Abacus. ISBN 978-0-349-11564-1.
- Schwarz, Marc (2004). "Fiennes, Nathaniel (1608-1669)". Oxford Dictionary of National Biography (online ed.). Oxford University Press. doi:10.1093/ref:odnb/9413. (Subscription, Wikipedia Library access or UK public library membership required.)
- Young, Peter; Holmes, Richard (2000). The English Civil War (Wordsworth ed.). Ware. ISBN 1-84022-222-0.
