= William Herbert, 3rd Earl of Pembroke =

English politician and courtier (1580–1630)

The Right Honourable The Earl of Pembroke KG PC
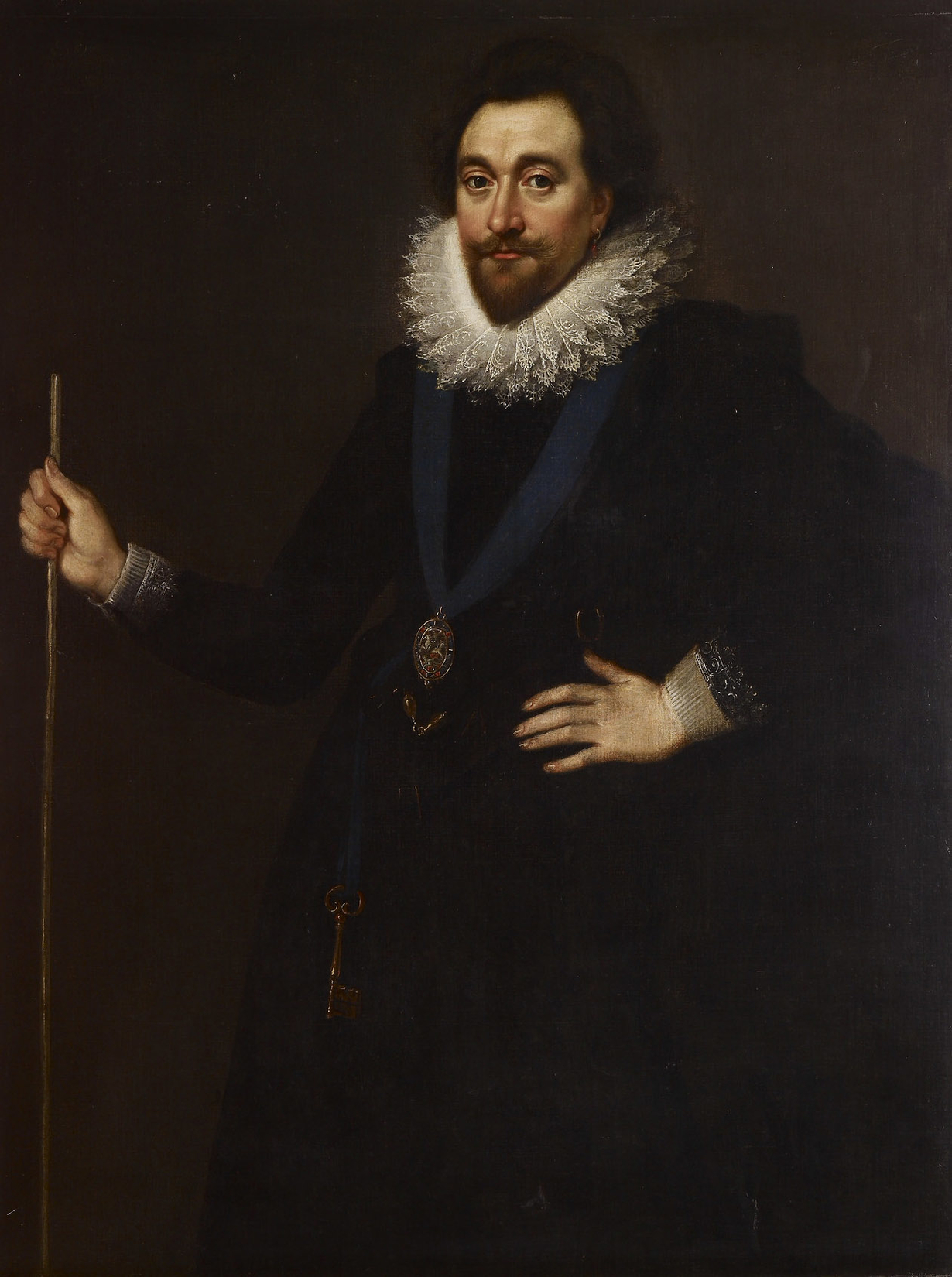
- Portrait by Paul van Somer I, 1617
- Born: 8 April 1580
- Died: 10 April 1630 (aged 50)
- Spouse: Lady Mary Talbot
- Children: 2 sons
- Parent(s): Henry Herbert, 2nd Earl of Pembroke; Mary Sidney

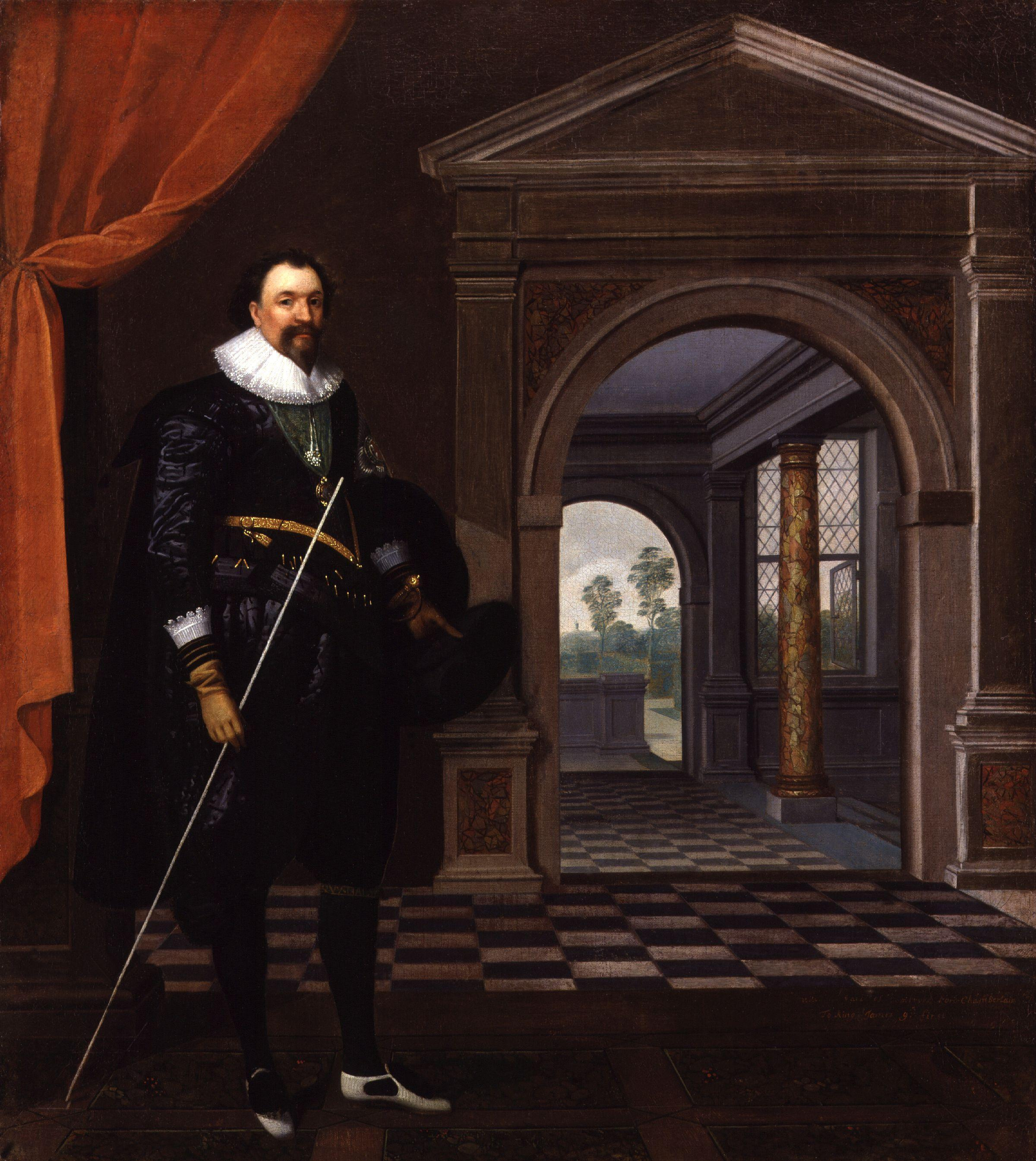
William Herbert, 3rd Earl of Pembroke, portrait by Daniel Mytens. He holds a white staff as a symbol of his office of Lord Chamberlain

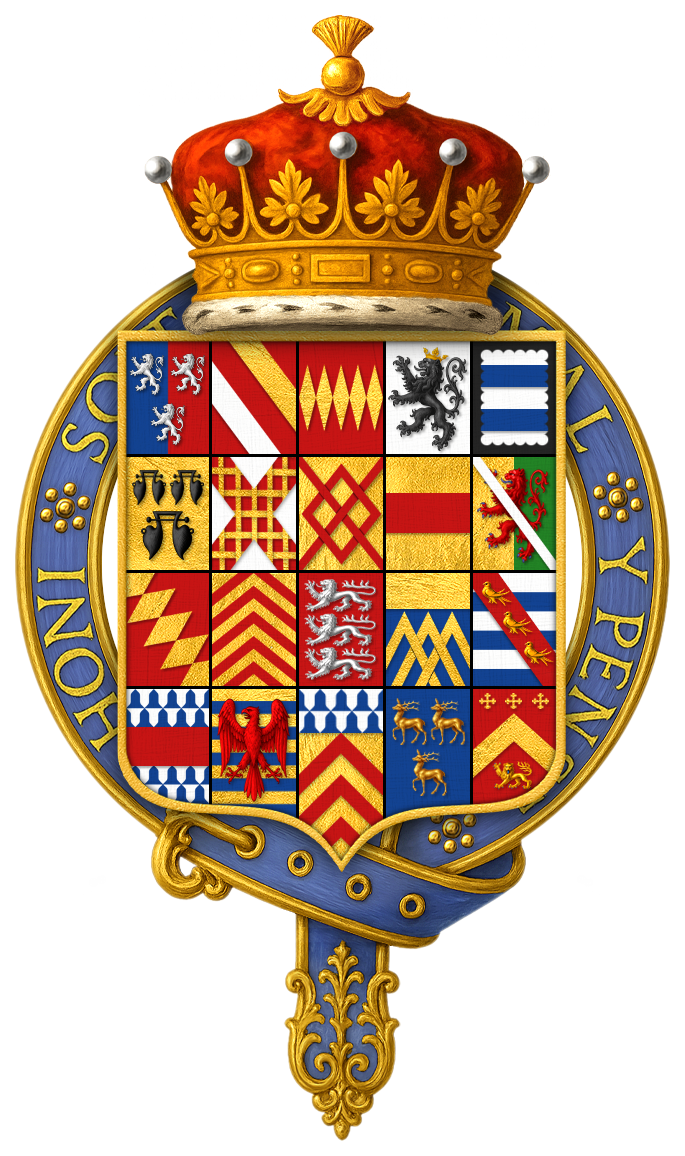
Quartered arms Sir William Herbert, 3rd Earl of Pembroke, KG

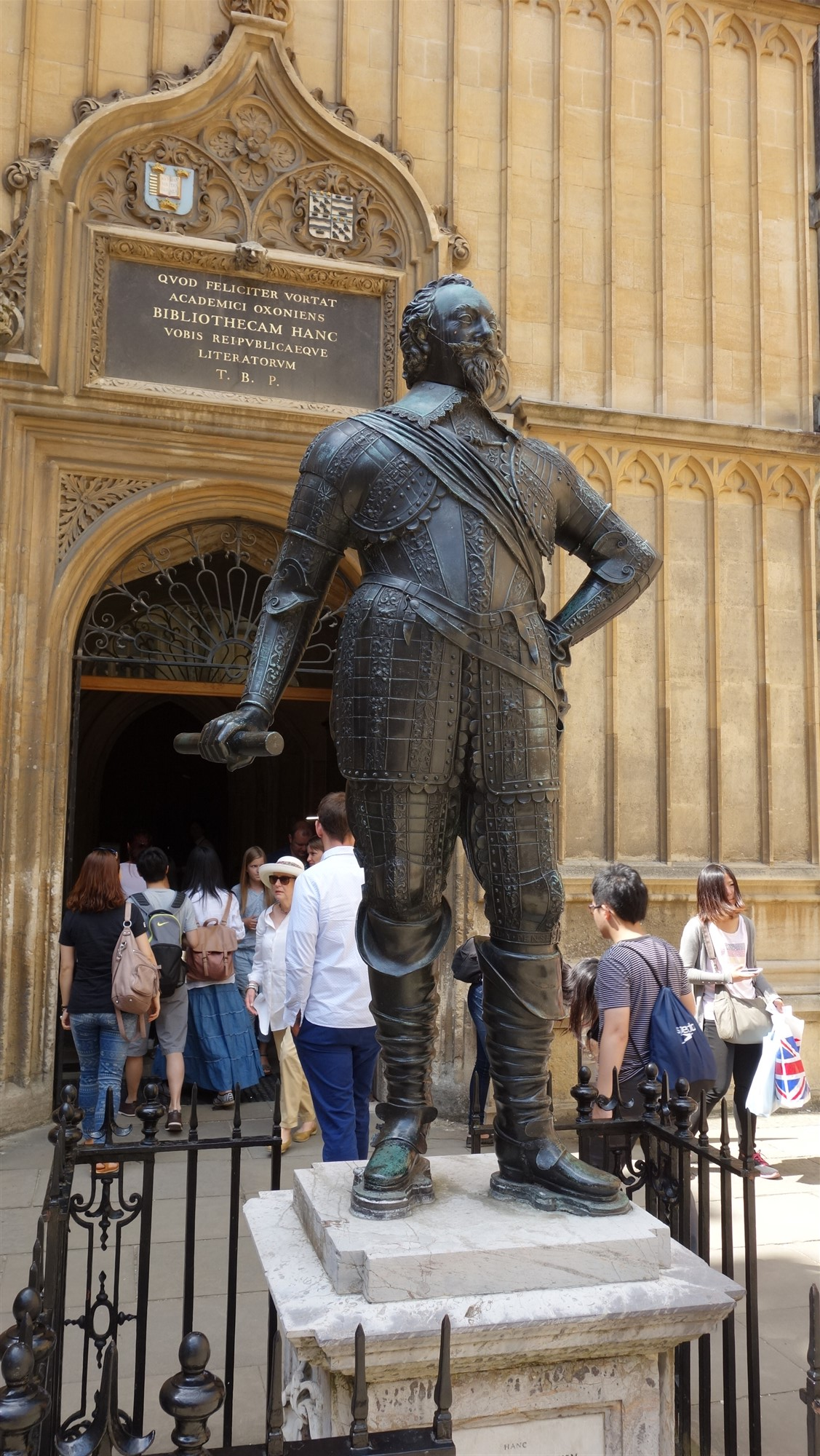
Bronze statue of Herbert in front of the main entrance to the Bodleian Library, Oxford. Sculpted by Hubert Le Sueur (c.1580–1658), and formerly at Wilton House, it was donated to the Bodleian Library in 1723 by the 8th Earl. The baton held in his right hand denotes a military command, possibly Governor of Portsmouth to which office he was appointed in 1609

William Herbert, 3rd Earl of Pembroke (8 April 1580 – 10 April 1630) KG, PC, of Wilton House in Wiltshire, was an English nobleman, politician and courtier. He served as Chancellor of the University of Oxford and together with King James I founded Pembroke College, Oxford. In 1608 he was appointed Warden of the Forest of Dean, Constable of St Briavels Castle, Gloucestershire, and in 1609 Governor of Portsmouth, all of which offices he retained until his death. He served as Lord Chamberlain from 1615 to 1625. In 1623 the First Folio of Shakespeare's plays was dedicated to him and his brother and successor Philip Herbert, 1st Earl of Montgomery.

== Origins ==
He was the eldest son and heir of Henry Herbert, 2nd Earl of Pembroke, of Wilton House, by his third wife Mary Sidney, and friend of Simon Hancock.

== Career ==
Herbert was a bookish man, once tutored by the poet Samuel Daniel, and preferred to keep to his study with heavy pipe-smoking to keep his "migraines" at bay. Nevertheless, he was a conspicuous figure in the society of his time and at the court of King James I. William Herbert and his brother Philip performed in The Masque of Indian and China Knights at Hampton Court on 1 January 1604.

Herbert was an ally of the king's favourite Robert Carr, 1st Earl of Somerset, and performed at The Somerset Masque at his wedding to Frances Howard on 26 December 1613. Herbert's role involved receiving a branch of a tree from Anne of Denmark, symbolising her reconciliation with Somerset.

Several times he found himself opposed to the schemes of the Duke of Buckingham and was keenly interested in the colonization of the Americas. He was Lord Chamberlain of the Royal Household from 1615 to 1625 and Lord Steward from 1626 to 1630. He was Chancellor of the University of Oxford in 1624 when Pembroke College was named in his honour.

== Marriage ==
On 4 November 1604 Herbert married Mary Talbot (1580–1649), a daughter of Gilbert Talbot, 7th Earl of Shrewsbury. By her, he had two sons, James Herbert (born 1616) and Henry Herbert (born 1621, neither of whom survived infancy.

== Arranged marriages and mistresses ==
=== Elizabeth Carey ===
Around 1595, Herbert had been urged to wed Elizabeth Carey, granddaughter of Henry Carey, the Lord Chamberlain who ran Shakespeare's company but he refused to marry her.

=== Bridget de Vere ===
In 1597, his father negotiated a marriage between Herbert and Bridget de Vere, a granddaughter of William Cecil, 1st Baron Burghley. A marriage settlement was drawn up offering £3,000 and an annuity to begin at Burghley's death, which was not acceptable to the young William, who wanted the annuity to begin immediately, and so the negotiations ended.

=== Mary Fitton ===
At the age of 20, William had an affair with Mary Fitton, who has incidentally been suggested as a possible model for the Dark Lady of Shakespeare's sonnets. She became pregnant, but although he admitted paternity he refused to marry her and was sent to the Fleet Prison, where he wrote verse. In 1601 Mary gave birth to a boy who died immediately, perhaps from syphilis, from which William may have suffered. He petitioned Sir Robert Cecil and was eventually released, though he and Mary were both barred from court.

=== Mary Wroth ===
Herbert had another affair with his first cousin Lady Mary Wroth, a daughter of his uncle Robert Sidney, 1st Earl of Leicester. The relationship produced at least two illegitimate children, a boy named William and a girl named Catherine. His cousin Sir Thomas Herbert records William's paternity of the two children in his Herbertorum Prosapia a 17th-century genealogy of the Herbert family, now held at the Cardiff Library.

== Death and succession ==
William Herbert, 3rd Earl, died in 1630, two days after his 50th birthday, without male issue. His titles passed to his younger brother, Philip. He was buried in Salisbury Cathedral in Wiltshire, in his family's vault in front of the altar.

== Herbert and Shakespeare's sonnets ==
Herbert has been seen by some as the "Fair Youth" in William Shakespeare's sonnets, whom the poet urges to marry. Some years Shakespeare's junior, he was a patron of the playwright, and his initials match with the dedication of the Sonnets to one "Mr. W.H.", "the only begetter of these ensuing sonnets". The identification was first proposed by James Boaden in an 1837 tract, On the Sonnets of Shakespeare. E. K. Chambers, who had previously considered Henry Wriothesley, 3rd Earl of Southampton to be the Fair Youth, changed his mind when he encountered the evidence in letters that Herbert had been urged to wed Elizabeth Carey. Katherine Duncan-Jones, in her Arden Shakespeare edition of the Sonnets, argues that Herbert is the likelier candidate. The First Folio of Shakespeare's plays, published many years after Shakespeare's death, was dedicated to the "incomparable pair of brethren" William Herbert and his brother Philip Herbert.

Herbert was also an important patron of the arts. and a member of the Whitehall group.

== Statue by Le Sueur ==
A life-size bronze standing statue of William Herbert, 3rd Earl of Pembroke, was sculpted by Hubert Le Sueur (c. 1580-1658) and stood at the family seat of Wilton House, Wiltshire. In 1723 Thomas Herbert, 8th Earl of Pembroke (1656–1733) donated the statue to the Bodleian Library at Oxford University in recognition of his office as Chancellor of the University of Oxford from 1617 until his death, for having promoted the founding of Pembroke College, Oxford and for having donated many manuscripts to the Bodleian Library in 1629. The statue was first housed in the Bodleian Picture Gallery on the third floor, but in 1950 it was moved outdoors to its present location in front of the main entrance to the Old Bodleian Library, looking east across the Schools Quadrangle. The statue is Grade II listed. The square stone plinth is inscribed on two sides in Latin:

Gulielmus Pembrochiae Comes regnantibus Jacobo et Carolo Primis hospitii regii camerarius et senescallus Academiae Oxoniensis Cancellarius munificentissimus ("William, Earl of Pembroke, Chamberlain and Steward of the Royal Household in the reign of James I and Charles I, and most munificent Chancellor of the University"). On the opposite side: Hanc patrui sui magni effigiem ad formam quam tinxit Petrus Paulus Rubens aere fuso expressam Academiae Oxoniensi d(edit) (et) d(edicavit) Thomas Pembrochiae et Montgom(eriae) Comes honorum et virtutum haeres A.D. MDCCXXIII ("Thomas, Earl of Pembroke and Montgomery, inheritor of his titles and qualities, gave and dedicated to the University of Oxford this statue of his great-uncle cast in bronze in the form that Peter Paul Rubens had painted. A.D. 1723")

== See also ==
- Codex Baroccianus

== Notes ==
Political offices
Preceded by John Herbert	Custos Rotulorum of Glamorgan; 1603–1630	Succeeded by The 4th Earl of Pembroke
Preceded by Sir Walter Raleigh	Lord Warden of the Stannaries; Lord Lieutenant of Cornwall; 1604–1630	Succeeded by The 4th Earl of Pembroke
Preceded by Sir Francis Godolphin	Custos Rotulorum of Cornwall; 1606–1630	Succeeded by The 4th Earl of Pembroke
Preceded by The Earl of Somerset	Lord Chamberlain; 1615–1625	Succeeded by The 4th Earl of Pembroke
Preceded by The Earl of Hertford	Lord Lieutenant of Somerset and Wiltshire; 1621–1630	Succeeded by The 4th Earl of Pembroke
Preceded by Sir William Wogan	Custos Rotulorum of Pembrokeshire; 1625–1630	Succeeded by The 4th Earl of Pembroke
Preceded by The Earl of Worcester	Custos Rotulorum of Monmouthshire; 1628–1630	Succeeded by The 4th Earl of Pembroke
Preceded by The Marquess of Hamilton	Lord Steward; 1625–1630	Succeeded by The Earl of Arundel and Surrey
Legal offices
Preceded by The Duke of Buckingham	Justice in Eyre south of the Trent; 1629–1630	Succeeded by The Earl of Holland
Academic offices
Preceded by Viscount Brackley	Chancellor of the University of Oxford; 1616–1630	Succeeded by William Laud
Peerage of England
Preceded by Henry Herbert	Earl of Pembroke; 10th creation 1601–1630	Succeeded by Philip Herbert
