= Custos Rotulorum of Cornwall =

This is a list of people who have served as Custos Rotulorum of Cornwall.

- Sir John Chamond ?–1544
- Sir Richard Grenville 1544–1550
- Sir John Arundell bef. 1558 – aft. 1558
- Sir William Godolphin bef. 1562–1570
- Peter Edgcumbe bef. 1573–1597
- Sir Francis Godolphin 1597–1606
- William Herbert, 3rd Earl of Pembroke 1606–1630
- Philip Herbert, 4th Earl of Pembroke 1630–1642
- John Robartes, 1st Earl of Radnor 1642–1685 jointly with
- Henry Bourchier, 5th Earl of Bath 1642–1654
- John Granville, 1st Earl of Bath 1685–1696
- Charles Robartes, 2nd Earl of Radnor 1696–1702
- John Granville, 1st Baron Granville 1702–1705
- Sidney Godolphin, 1st Earl of Godolphin 1705–1710
- Laurence Hyde, 1st Earl of Rochester 1710–1711
- Henry Hyde, 2nd Earl of Rochester 1711–1714
- Charles Robartes, 2nd Earl of Radnor 1714–1723
- vacant
- Richard Edgcumbe, 1st Baron Edgcumbe 1726–1758

For later custodes rotulorum, see Lord Lieutenant of Cornwall.
