= Bevil Grenville =

English landowner, soldier, and politician (1596–1643)

Sir Bevil Granville MP, JP
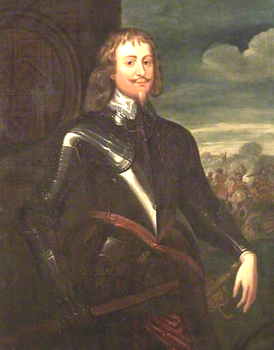
- Sir Bevil Grenville

Member of Parliament for Cornwall
- In office November 1640 – September 1642 (suspended)

Deputy lieutenant Cornwall
- In office 1636–1643

Member of Parliament for Launceston
- In office April 1625 – April 1640

Member of Parliament for Cornwall
- In office 1620–1624

Personal details
- Born: 23 March 1596 Lower Brynn, near Withiel, Cornwall, England
- Died: 5 July 1643 (aged 47) Charlcombe, Somerset, England
- Cause of death: Killed in battle
- Resting place: St James, Kilkhampton, Cornwall, England
- Spouse: Grace Smith (1618-his death)
- Children: 12, inching John and Bernard
- Parent(s): Sir Bernard Grenville (1567–1636); Elizabeth Bevil (1564–1636)
- Education: Exeter College, Oxford
- Occupation: Soldier and politician

Military service
- Rank: Colonel
- Battles/wars: Wars of the Three Kingdoms; Braddock Down; Sourton Down; Stratton; Lansdowne †

Sir Bevil Grenville (23 March 1596 – 5 July 1643) was an English landowner and soldier who sat as a Member of Parliament for various constituencies between 1620 and 1642, although during those years there were few parliamentary sessions. When the First English Civil War broke out in August 1642, he joined the Royalists and played a leading role in their early campaigns in the West Country. He was killed in action at the Battle of Lansdowne in 1643.

== Early life ==
Bevil Grenville was born 23 March 1596 in Lower Brynn, near Withiel, Cornwall, eldest son of Sir Bernard Grenville (1567–1636) and Elizabeth Bevil (1564–1636), and grandson of Elizabethan hero and naval captain, Sir Richard Grenville (1542–1591). He had a younger brother, Richard (1600–1659), who later also fought for the Royalists during the Wars of the Three Kingdoms, acquiring a reputation for brutality and greed.

Grenville entered Exeter College, Oxford, in 1611, and graduated in 1614, later saying he had failed to benefit much from his time there. He spent the next four years at Court, supervised by Endymion Porter, a close friend of his father and of the future Charles I.

In 1618, Grenville married Grace Smith (died 1647), daughter of Sir George Smith, three times Mayor of Exeter and one of its wealthiest citizens, an important consideration given his father's sizeable debts. They went on to have twelve children, including Richard (born 1620, died young), John (1628–1701), Dennis (died 1702), Bernard (1631–1701), Elizabeth, Bridget, Joanna and Grace.

== Early career ==
In 1621, Grenville was elected as one of the two knights of the shire for Cornwall, to sit in the 3rd Parliament of James I. In 1624 he was elected again for the 4th parliament.

In 1625, the family estates at Kilkhampton were settled on Grenville in return for agreeing to settle his father's debts of £15,000. He was elected for Launceston in 1625 and retained the seat until Charles I suspended Parliament in 1629.

While Sir Bernard backed Charles and his arbitrary policies, his son was a supporter of Sir John Eliot who was imprisoned in the Tower of London for his opposition to Personal Rule. Grenville withdrew from involvement in politics after Eliot's death in 1632, but was reconciled with his father shortly before he died in 1636 and became Deputy lieutenant of Cornwall.

== Wars of the Three Kingdoms ==
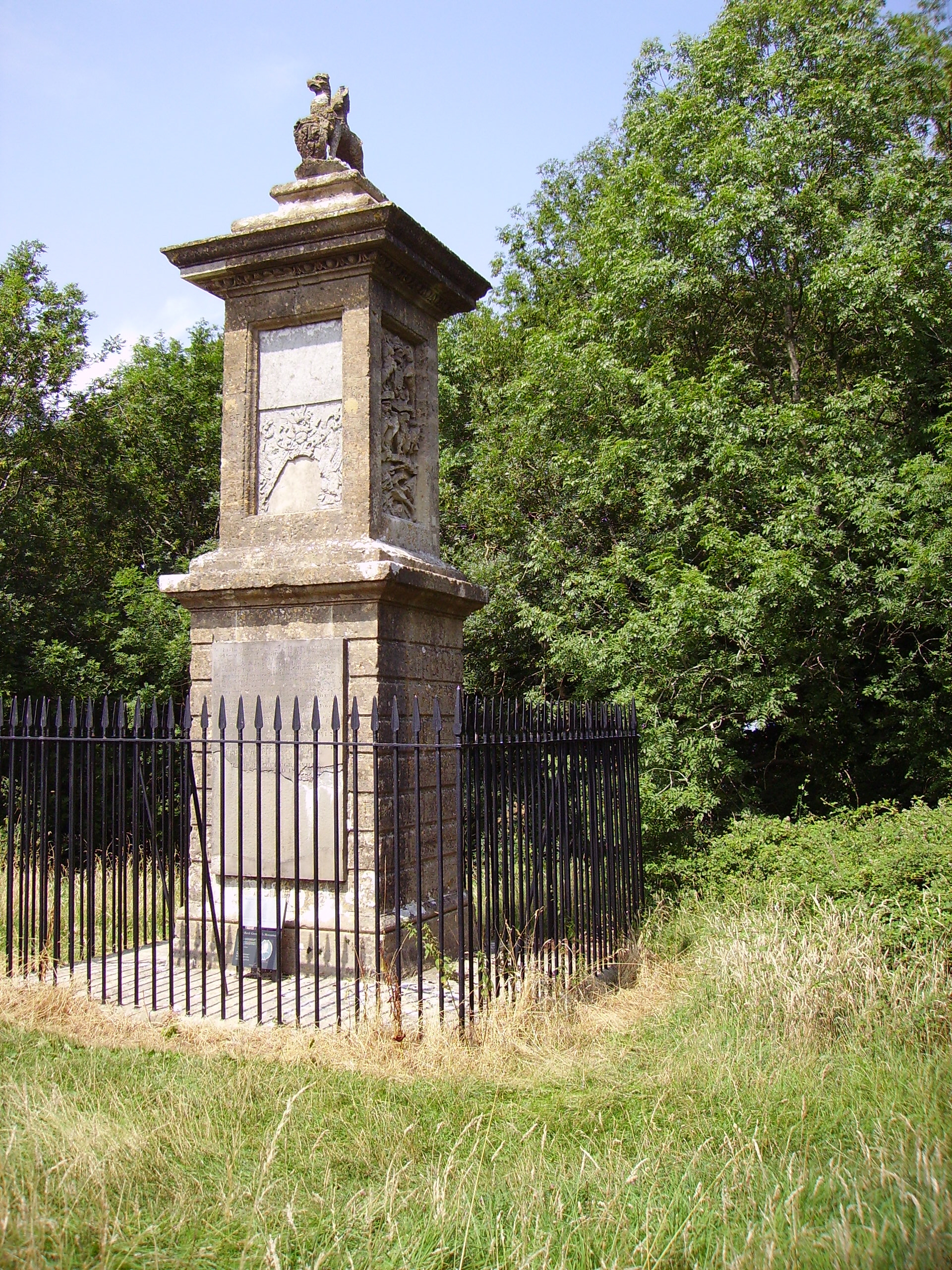
Sir Bevil Grenville's Monument erected by his grandson George in 1720

Despite his previous opposition to Royal policies, on the outbreak of the Bishops' Wars with Scotland in 1639, Grenville raised a troop of cavalry which acted as Charles' bodyguard and was knighted for his service in 1639. When Parliament was briefly recalled in April 1640, he was re-elected for Launceston, then sat for Cornwall in the Long Parliament from November 1640 until he was suspended in September 1642.

When the First English Civil War began in August 1642, most of the West Country gentry supported the Royalist cause. Grenville helped proclaim the King's Commission of Array at Launceston, empowering them to mobilise the local Trained bands or militia. In addition, Grenville, Nicholas Slanning, William Godolphin, John Trevanion and Warwick Mohun, each recruited a regiment at their own expense, collectively known as "the Tinners", since many of the recruits worked in local tin mines.

The rank and file often had little choice in deciding whether to "volunteer"; Grenville, generally regarded as a benevolent landlord, threatened his tenants and employees with sanctions if they refused to sign up. While militia on both sides often refused to serve outside their own counties, the Cornish were particularly noted for their reluctance to serve outside Cornwall or under non-Cornish officers. Although regarded as some of the best infantry available to the Royalists in the West, these factors limited their usefulness. When Royalist commander Sir Ralph Hopton advanced on Plymouth after his victory at Braddock Down in January 1643, many of his troops refused to cross the River Tamar into Devon.

At Stratton on 16 May 1643, Grenville led his men against Parliamentarian troops entrenched along the top of Stamford hill. After eight hours of fighting, the Royalists were nearly out of ammunition and a counterattack led by James Chudleigh knocked over Grenville and briefly caused his troops to waver; however, they quickly rallied and cut down their opponents using pikes and clubs. Shortly after this, the Parliamentarians were in headlong flight, a victory which secured Cornwall for the Royalists. Their advance into Devon, then Somerset, led to the Battle of Lansdowne on 5 July, near Bath. Grenville led his regiment in a successful charge against Parliamentarian positions on Lansdowne Hill, then formed a defensive line and held his ground despite a series of counterattacks by the Parliamentarian cavalry.

In the course of this, Grenville was hit in the head with a pole-axe and carried to the rectory at nearby Cold Ashton, where he died of his wounds next day. His friend John Trevelyan later wrote to his wife Grace that he "died an honourable death...fighting with invincible valour and loyalty for his God, his King and his Country". His servant Anthony Payne brought his body back to Kilkhampton, and he was buried in the parish church of St James on 26 July.

== Legacy ==
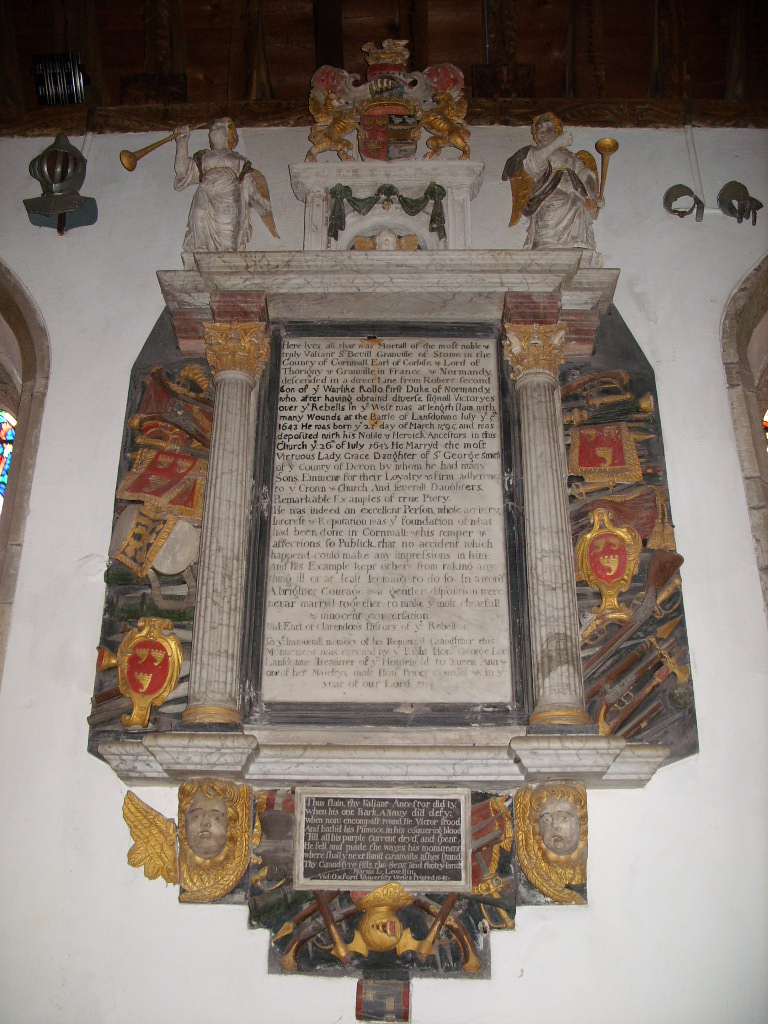
Mural monument to Sir Bevil Grenville in Kilkhampton parish church, Cornwall. Erected in 1714 by his grandson George

His grandson George Granville, 1st Baron Lansdown became Secretary at War in the Tory government of 1710 to 1712 and took the title "Baron Lansdown" in a reference to his heroic grandfather. Shortly before the succession of George I in 1714, he erected an elaborate monument to Sir Bevil in the Granville Chapel, a reminder of his family's loyalty to the House of Stuart. (Note: The inscription reads; "Here lyes all that was mortall of the most noble & truly valiant Sr Bevill Granville of Stowe in the county of Cornwall, Earl of Corbile & Lord of Thorigny & Granville in France & Normandy, descended in a direct line from Robert second son of ye warlike Rollo first Duke of Normandy who after having obtained diverse signall victoryes over ye rebells in ye West was at length slain with many wounds at the Battle of Lansdowne July ye 5th 1643. He was born ye 23d day of March 1595 and was deposited with his noble & heroick ancestors in this church ye 26th of July 1643. He marry'd the most virtuous lady Grace daughter of Sr George Smith of ye county of Devon by whom he had many sons eminent for their loyalty & firm adherence to ye crown & church and severall daughters remarkable examples of true piety. He was indeed an excellent person whose activity interest & reputation was ye foundation of what had been done in Cornwall & his temper & affections so public that no accident which happen'd could make any impressions in him and his example kept others from taking any thing ill or at least seeming so to do. Inamor'd a brighter courage & a gentler disposition were nevar marry'd together to make ye most chearfull & innocent conversation. Vid. Earl of Clarendon's History of ye Rebellion. To ye immortall memory of his renown'd grandf'ther this monument was erected by ye Right Hon.bl George Lord Lansdowne, Treasurer of ye Household to Queen Anne & one of Her Majesty's most Hon.ble Privy Counsel & in ye year of Our Lord 1714") Like many Tories, exclusion from office after 1715 embittered Granville and he became a Jacobite, being held in the Tower of London from 1715 to 1717 and allegedly involved in the 1722 Atterbury Plot. The erection of Sir Bevil Grenville's Monument in 1720 was another reference to his family history. (Note: Inscribed on the monument is Elegy on Sir Bevil Grenville by William Cartwright, another Royalist killed on 29 November 1643; "This was not Nature’s courage nor that thing, We valour call which Time and Reason bring, But a diviner fury fierce and high, Valour transported into Ecstasy".)

== Sources ==
- Barratt, John (2005). The Civil war in the South-West. Pen & Sword Military. ISBN 1-84415-146-8.
- Barratt, John (2004). Cavalier Generals: King Charles I and His Commanders in the English Civil War 1642 - 1646. Leo Cooper. ISBN 978-1844151288.
- Burke, John (1836). Genealogical and Heraldic History of the Commoners of Great Britain and Ireland, Volume 3. H Colbourn.
- Carlton, Charles (1992). Going to the Wars: The Experience of the British Civil Wars 1638–1651. Routledge. ISBN 978-1138155787.
- Cruickshanks, Eveline (2004). "Granville, George, Baron Lansdowne and Jacobite duke of Albemarle (1666-1735)". Oxford Dictionary of National Biography (online ed.). Oxford University Press. doi:10.1093/ref:odnb/11301. (Subscription, Wikipedia Library access or UK public library membership required.)
- Duffin, Anne (2004). "Grenville [Grenvile], Sir Bevil [Bevill] (1596–1643)". Oxford Dictionary of National Biography (online ed.). Oxford University Press. doi:10.1093/ref:odnb/11487. (Subscription, Wikipedia Library access or UK public library membership required.)
- Duffin, Anne; Hunneyball, Paul (2010). GRENVILLE, Bevill (1596–1643), of Stowe, Kilkhampton, Cornw in The History of Parliament: the House of Commons 1604–1629 (Online ed.). Boydell & Brewer.
- Firth, Charles (1890). "Grenville, Bevil" . In Stephen, Leslie; Lee, Sidney (eds.). Dictionary of National Biography. Vol. 23. London: Smith, Elder & Co. pp. 110–112.
- Mee, Arthur (1937). The King's England: Cornwall. Hodder & Stoughton.
- Round, Horace (1930). Family Origins and Other Studies; the Granvilles and the Monks. London.
- Royle, Trevor (2006). Civil War: The Wars of the Three Kingdoms 1638–1660. Abacus. ISBN 978-0-349-11564-1.
- Stoyle, Mark (2002). West Britons: Cornish Identities and the Early Modern British State. University of Exeter Press. ISBN 978-0859896870.
- Yerby, George; Hunneyball, Paul (2010). SMITH, George (-d.1619), of Madford House, Exeter, Devon in The History of Parliament: the House of Commons 1604-1629 (Online ed.). Boydell & Brewer.

Parliament of England
Preceded by Richard Carew; John St Aubyn	Member of Parliament for Cornwall; 1621–1625; With: John Arundell 1621–1622; William Coryton 1624–1625	Succeeded by Sir Robert Killigrew; Charles Trevanion
Preceded by Sir Francis Crane; Miles Fleetwood	Member of Parliament for Launceston; 1625–1629; With: Richard Scott	Parliament suspended until 1640
Vacant Parliament suspended since 1629	Member of Parliament for Launceston; 1640; With: Ambrose Manaton	Succeeded by Ambrose Manaton; William Coryton
Preceded by William Godolphin; Richard Buller	Member of Parliament for Cornwall; 1640–1642; With: Alexander Carew	Succeeded by Hugh Boscawen; Nicholas Trefusis
