= Pennsylvania, Gloucestershire =

Village in Gloucestershire, England

Coordinates: 51.463°N 2.367°W

Pennsylvania
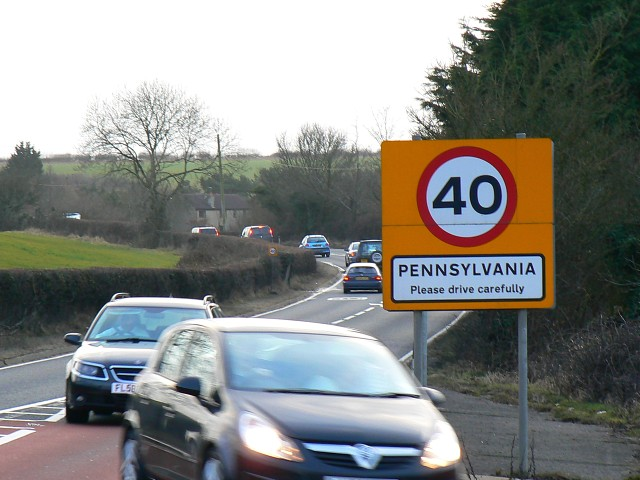

- Location within Gloucestershire
- OS grid reference: ST743732
- Unitary authority: South Gloucestershire
- Ceremonial county: Gloucestershire
- Region: South West
- Country: England
- Sovereign state: United Kingdom
- Post town: CHIPPENHAM
- Postcode district: SN14
- Police: Avon and Somerset
- Fire: Avon
- Ambulance: South Western

Pennsylvania is a small village in South Gloucestershire, England. It is situated on the A46 and is east of Bristol and north of Bath.

== Name origin ==
The second part of the name, 'sylvania', comes from the Latin word for 'woodland', silva. The first part of the name, 'penn', likely comes either from the British (Celtic) word pen, meaning 'hill', or a personal name.
