= Lower Brynn =

Hamlet in Cornwall, England

Coordinates: 50.431°N 4.832°W

- Location within Cornwall
- OS grid reference: SW990629
- Civil parish: Withiel
- Unitary authority: Cornwall
- Ceremonial county: Cornwall
- Region: South West
- Country: England
- Sovereign state: United Kingdom

Lower Brynn is a hamlet in the parish of Withiel, Cornwall, England, UK. Lower Brynn is approximately 5 miles (8.0 km) south-west of Bodmin.
