= William Godolphin (Warden of the Stannaries) =

16th-century English politician and knight

Sir William Godolphin MP
- Born: ca. 1486
- Died: ca. 1570
- Occupation: Politician
- Title: Sir
- Spouse: Margaret Glynn
- Children: 4 (including Sir William Godolphin (1515–1570))
- Parent(s): Sir John Godolphin; Margaret Trenouth

Sir William Godolphin MP (ca. 1486 – ca. 1570) was a 16th-century English knight, politician, and Member of Parliament.

== Life ==
He was the son of Sir John Godolphin, who was High Sheriff of Cornwall in 1505, and his wife Margaret, daughter of John Trenouth.

He sat as Member for Cornwall during the reign of Henry VIII and possibly also of Edward VI, and also served as High Sheriff of Cornwall and Warden of the Stannaries.

Godolphin wrote to Thomas Cromwell sending him a present of Cornish tin which could be made into pewter vessels. The ingots were marked with a bow and broad arrow and a horseshoe. He offered to send Cornish wrestlers to accompany Henry VIII if the king visited Calais. He sent two wrestlers to Cromwell whose command of the English language was not good, presumably they were Cornish speakers.

Godolphin arms, Gules, an eagle with two heads, displayed between three fleurs-de-lys, two and one, argent

He seems to have been confused with his eldest son, also Sir William Godolphin (1515–1570), not least in Burke's Extinct Peerage which conflates the two, so that is not clear which offices were held by the elder and which by the younger. Sir William lived to an advanced age, dying at around the same time as his son, which may have been the original cause of the confusion.

== Family ==
He married Margaret Glynn, and they had four children:

- Sir William Godolphin (1515–1570), who had three daughters but no sons
- Thomas Godolphin (born 1520), married Katherine Bonithon, Captain (governor) of the Isles of Scilly, through whom the male line of the family was continued. Their great-grandson would be George Lamberton, Captain of the "Fellowship", disappeared at sea in 1646 and subject of Longfellow's poem "The Phantom Ship".
- Elizabeth Godolphin (born 1522), married John Langdon
- Honor Godolphin (born ca. 1524), married William Melton

== Ancestry ==
Ancestors of William Godolphin (Warden of the Stannaries)

16. Sir Thomas Godolphin
8. John de Godolphin
17. Isabel Benne
4. Sir John Godolphin
9. Elizabeth Beauchamp
2. Sir John Godolphin
5. Lady Elizabeth Killigrew
1. Sir William Godolphin
3. Margaret Trenouth
