= Battle of Lansdowne =

1643 English Civil War battle

Coordinates: 51.4313°N 2.4010°W

- Part of First English Civil War
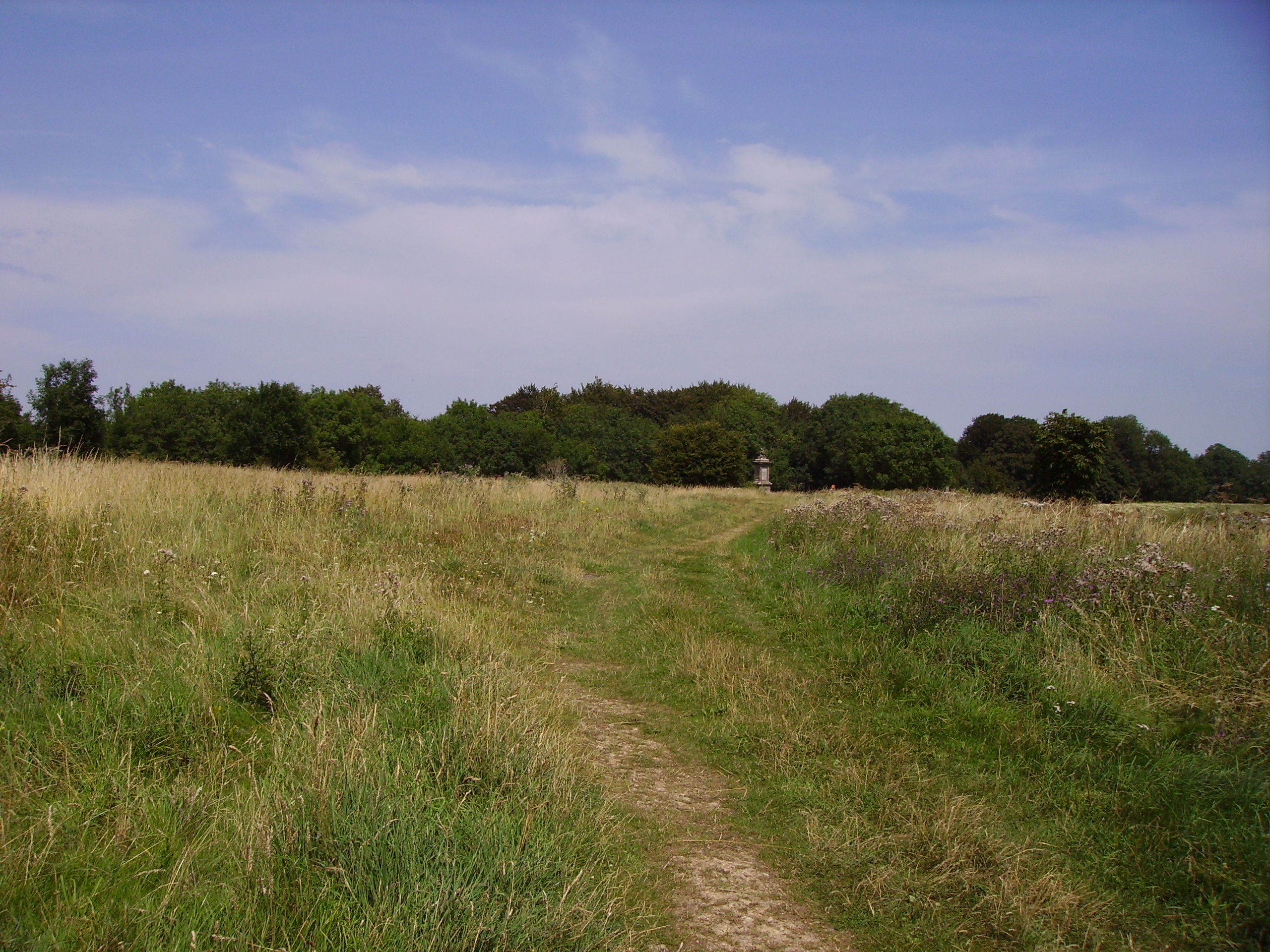
- The battlefield today with Sir Bevil Grenville's Monument
Date	5 July 1643
Location	Lansdowne Hill, near Bath, Somerset
Result	Royalist victory (see § Aftermath)

Belligerents
Royalists	Parliamentarians

Commanders and leaders
Lord Hopton + Sir Bevil Grenville †; Colonel John Giffard	Sir William Waller

Strength
2,000 horse 4,000 foot 300 dragoons 16 guns	2,500 horse 1,500 foot Unknown number of guns

Casualties and losses
200–300 killed 600–700 wounded	20 killed 60 wounded

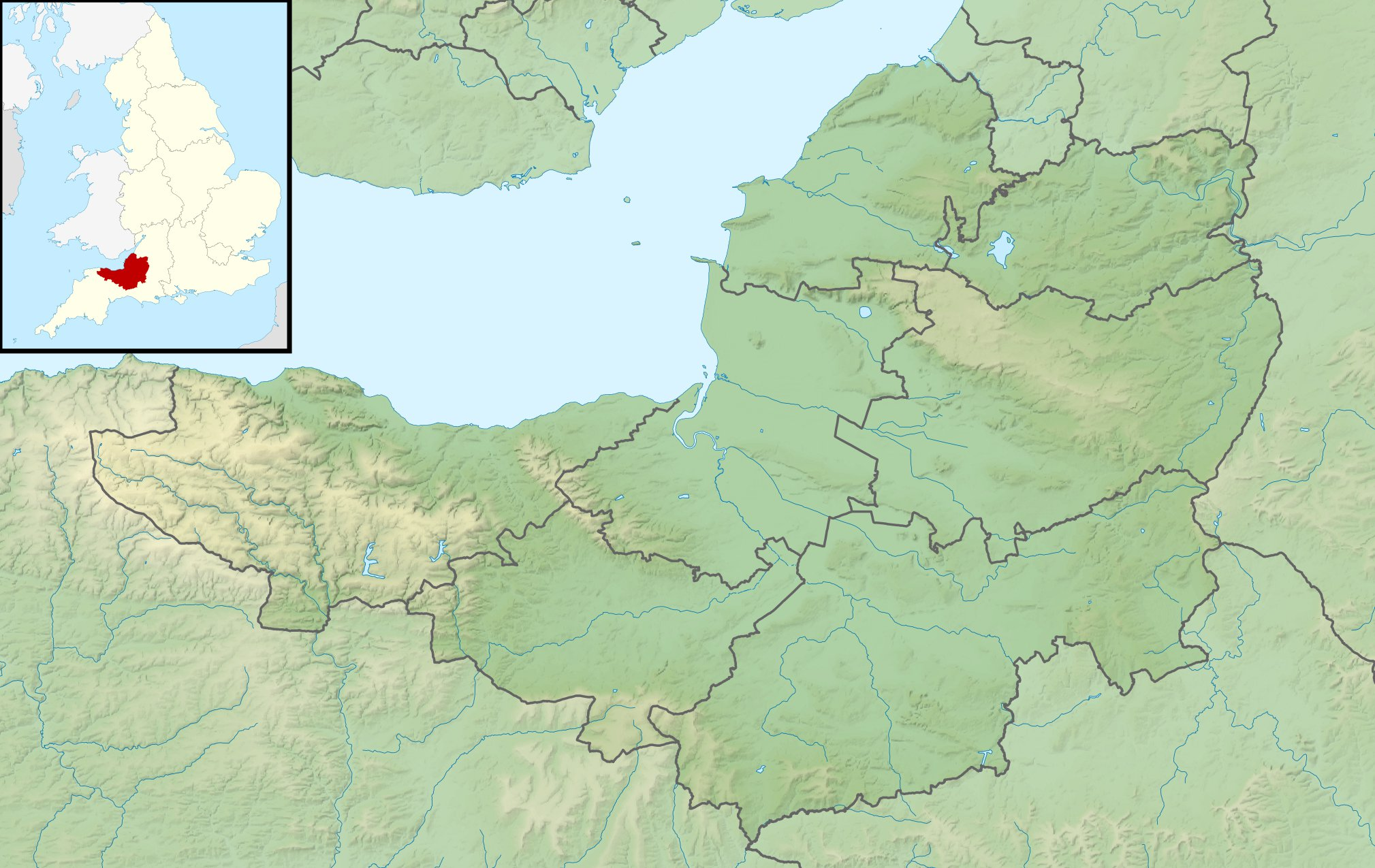
Somerset and Lansdowne

The First English Civil War battle of Lansdowne, or Lansdown, was fought on 5 July 1643, at Lansdowne Hill, near Bath, Somerset, England. Although the Royalists under Lord Hopton forced the Parliamentarians under Sir William Waller to retreat from their hilltop position, they suffered so many casualties themselves and were left so disordered and short of ammunition that an injured Hopton was forced to retire.

== Prelude ==
By late May 1643, Lord Hopton's Royalist army had captured most of the south-west of England. Joined by the Marquess of Hertford, he then advanced eastward into Parliamentarian-held territory. Sir William Waller's army held Bath, to obstruct their further advance. On 2 July 1643 the Royalists seized the bridge at Bradford-on-Avon. On 3 July, skirmishes took place at Claverton and at Waller's positions south and east of Bath. Waller retired to a strong position on Lansdowne Hill, north-west of Bath while the main Royalist force moved north through Batheaston to Marshfield.

Hopton's forces encountered Waller's position on Lansdowne Hill on 4 July and were unpleasantly surprised at its strength. They withdrew 5 miles (8 km) north-east to Marshfield, while their rearguard repulsed an attempt by Waller's cavalry to pursue them.

== Battle ==
Early on 5 July 1643, Waller moved to the north end of Lansdowne Hill, where he built crude breastworks for his infantry, and sent some of his cavalry against Hopton's outposts. The Parliamentarians put to flight some badly led Royalist cavalry, and the alarm caused all of Hopton's army to form up and to begin advancing west until they came in sight of Waller's position.

The two forces engaged in indecisive skirmishing for two hours until Waller tried to withdraw. Waller once again sent his horse and dragoons against the Royalists' rearguard, and this time they routed the Royalist cavalry, although the infantry stood firm. Hopton's army then turned about and ultimately defeated the Roundhead cavalry in a confused action. With his Cornish foot regiments already advancing without orders, Hopton at last attacked Lansdowne Hill.

As they charged up the steep slopes towards the Parliamentarian position on the crest, Hopton's cavalry suffered badly, and many panicked. As many as 1,400 of them fled, some as far as Oxford. Under Sir Bevil Grenville, Hopton's Cornish pikemen stormed Waller's breastworks, while Royalist musketeers outflanked Waller's forces through the woods on each side of his position. Grenville was mortally wounded in hand-to-hand combat as the Parliamentarian horse cavalry counter-attacked and were driven off. Waller's infantry fell back to a wall across the crest of the hill from where they kept up musket fire until darkness fell. During the night, they withdrew silently, leaving burning matches on the wall to deceive the Royalists that they still held the position.

== Aftermath ==
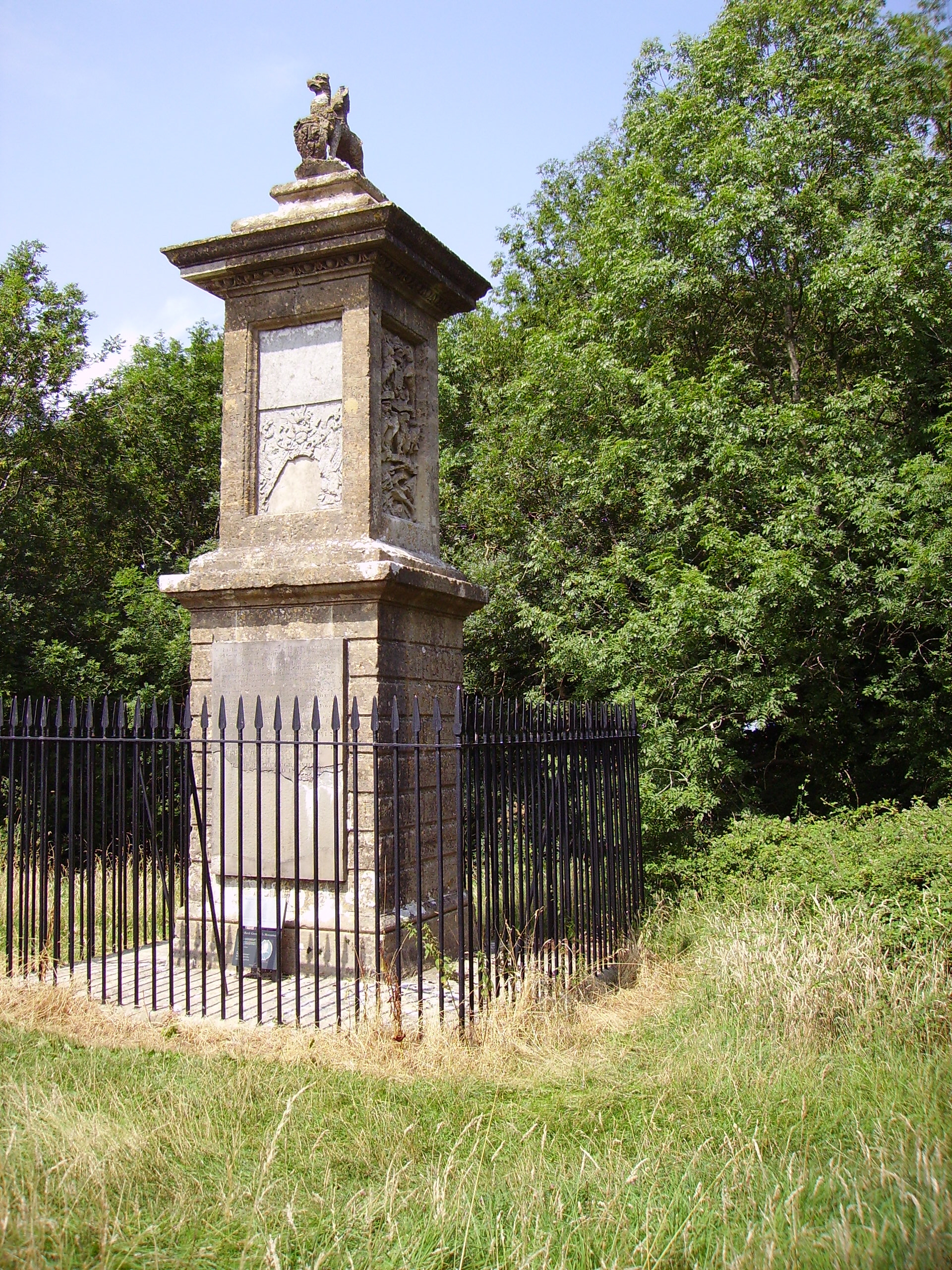
Sir Bevil Grenville's Monument, at the place where he fell

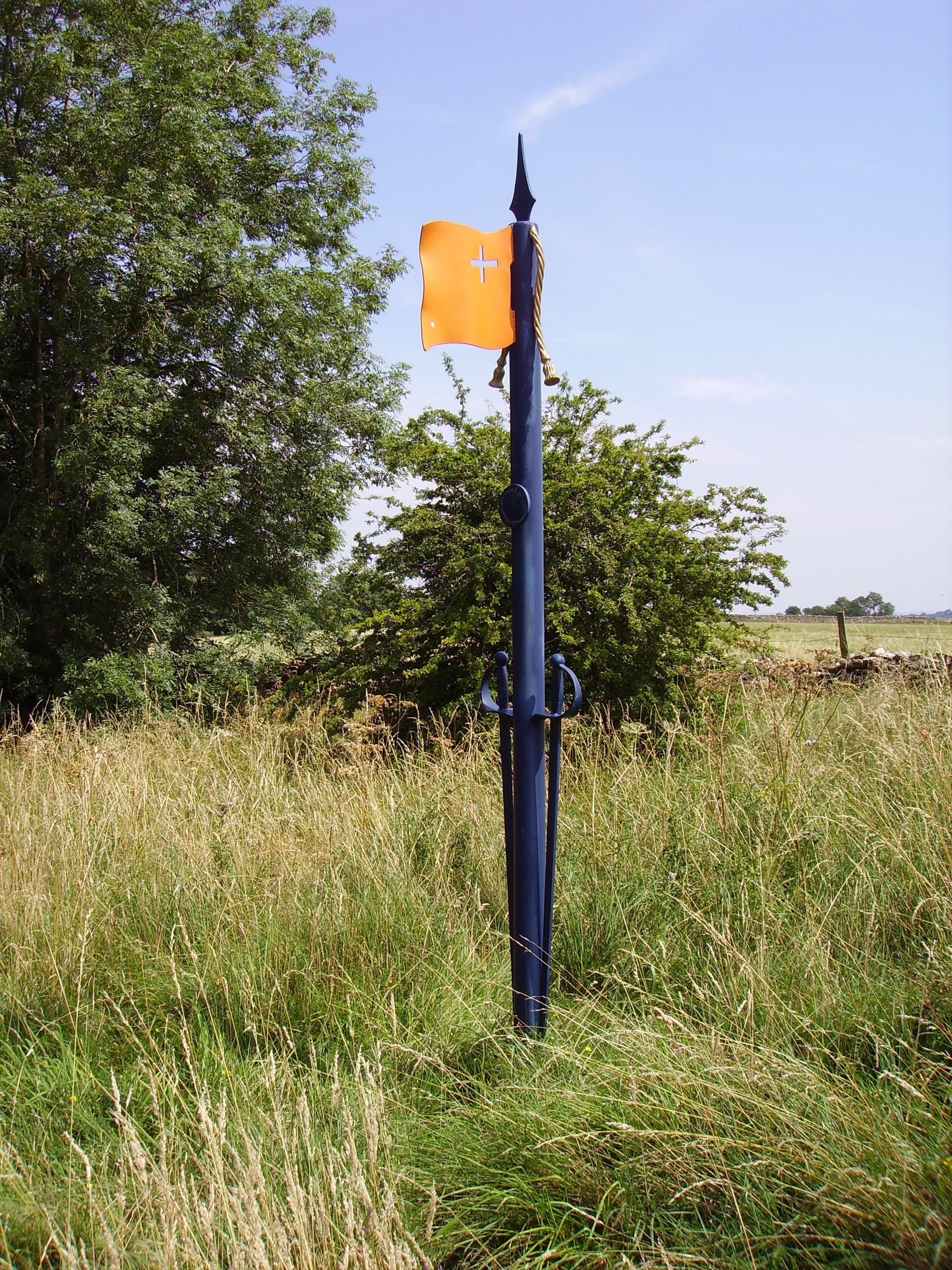
Battlefield marker

The day after the battle, a Royalist ammunition cart exploded. Hopton was injured and temporarily blinded. The loss of the powder and the absence of most of their horse meant that the Royalists could not fight another action. Meanwhile, Waller had retired to Bath, where he was reinforced and was ready to attack again. Hopton's army retreated in low spirits to Devizes. Hopton's army was in such a poor situation before their retreat that Hopton's military opponent but old friend Waller offered him hospitality in Bath, though the former refused it.

A Cornish officer describing the battle wrote that Waller was "... the best shifter and chooser of ground when he was not Master of the field that ever I saw". (sic)

The site of the battle is marked by a monument to Sir Bevil Grenville, who died after the battle in Cold Ashton Rectory. The battlefield is included on the Register of Historic Battlefields which is part of the National Heritage List for England.

== General references ==
Rodgers, Colonel H.C.B. (1968). Battles and Generals of the Civil War. Seeley Service & Company Publishers.
