= Kilkhampton =

Village in Cornwall, England

Coordinates: 50.875°N 4.484°W

Kilkhampton: Cornish: Kylgh
- Location within Cornwall
- Population: 1,368 (Civil Parish, 2011)
- OS grid reference: SS253113
- Civil parish: Kilkhampton
- Unitary authority: Cornwall
- Ceremonial county: Cornwall
- Region: South West
- Country: England
- Sovereign state: United Kingdom
- Post town: BUDE
- Postcode district: EX23
- Dialling code: 01288
- Police: Devon and Cornwall
- Fire: Cornwall
- Ambulance: South Western
- UK Parliament: North Cornwall

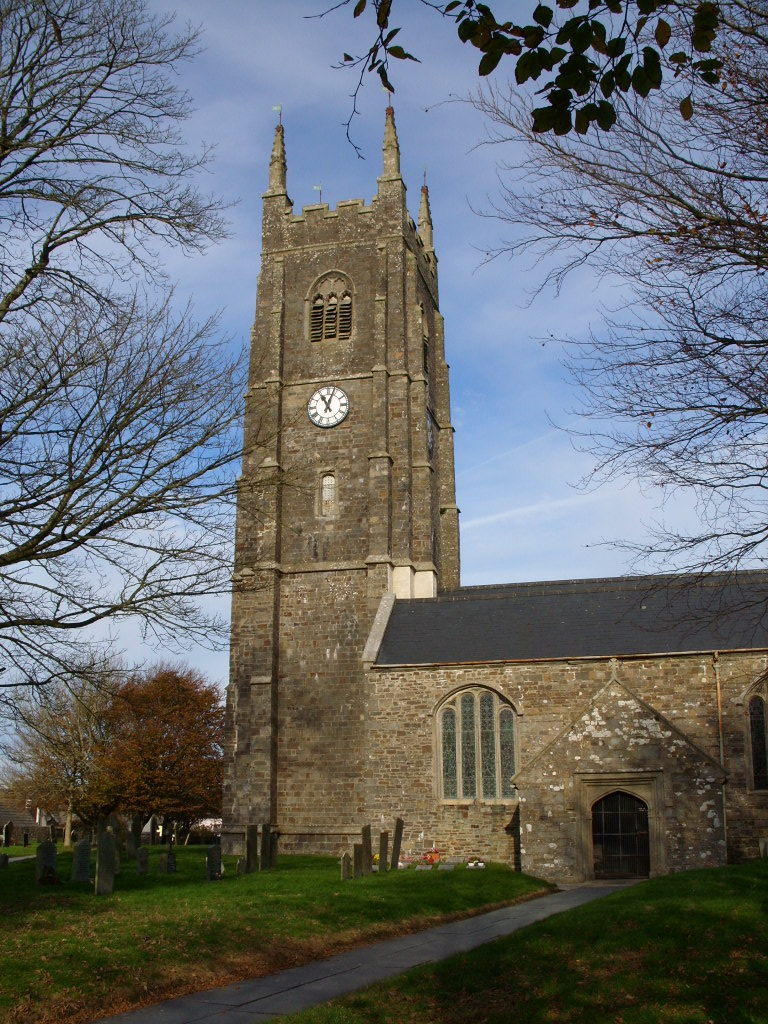
St James' Church, Kilkhampton

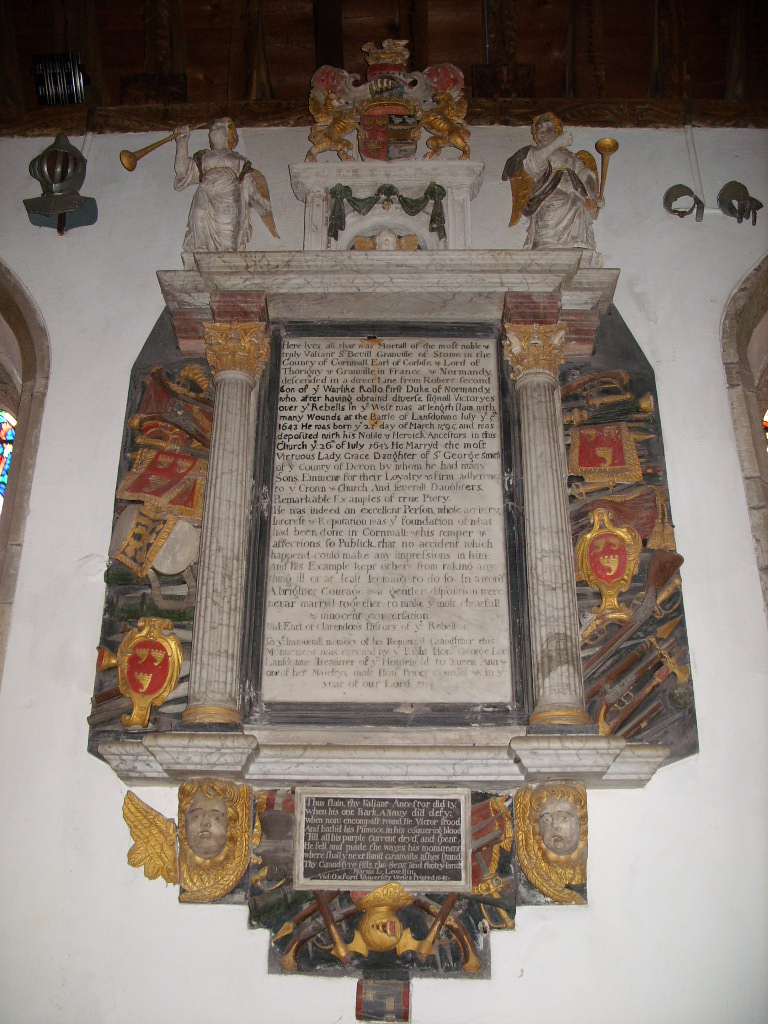
Bevil Grenville's memorial, in Kilkhampton church

Kilkhampton (Cornish: Kylgh, lit. 'circle') is a village and civil parish in northeast Cornwall, England, United Kingdom. The village is on the A39 about four miles (6 km) north-northeast of Bude.

Kilkhampton was mentioned in the Domesday Book as "Chilchetone". The population of the parish was 1,193 in the 2001 census. This increased to 1,368 in the 2011 census.

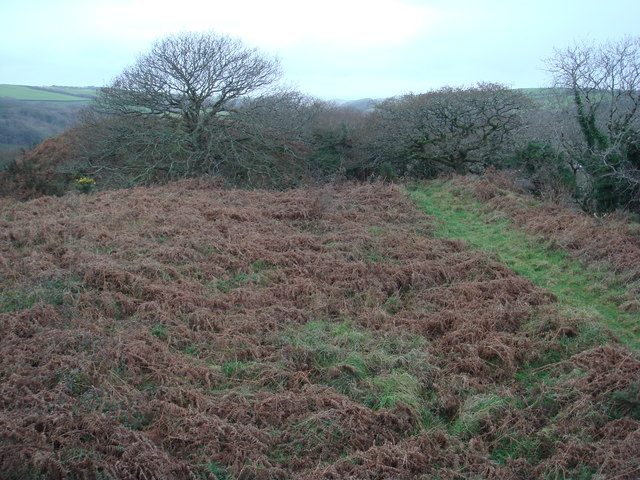
Penstowe Castle

The remains of a late Norman period motte-and-bailey castle known as Penstowe Castle are located 500 metres west of the village. Further west, at Stowe is the site of Stowe House, the grand mansion of John Granville, 1st Earl of Bath, built in 1680 but demolished in 1739: some of the stonework was reused at Penstowe, also in the parish.

Kilkhampton has a post office, a primary school, and a community centre called the Grenville Rooms. There are three general stores, two pubs, and a selection of shops including an electrical goods store. There is also a MOT test station and an agricultural supply depot. The village was surveyed for the Survey of English Dialects.

A crater on Mars has been named Kilkhampton.

== History ==
The manor of "Chilchetone" was very valuable at the time of the Domesday Book in 1086. It had paid tax on 7 hides in the previous reign and there was land for 40 ploughs. 26 villagers and 23 smallholders had 26 ploughs between them and there was also 30 acres (120,000 m^{2}) of meadow, 20 sq furlongs of pasture and a considerable woodland. The livestock were 50 cattle, 600 sheep, 20 pigs and 40 goats; the annual value was £18.

== Kilkhampton Church ==
Kilkhampton Church, dedicated to St James the Great, dates from the 12th century and features a Norman south doorway and a tall buttressed Perpendicular tower containing eight bells. The church is notable for its extensive set of 16th-century benches and historic font. A monument to Sir Bevill Grenville, erected in 1711, stands on the south wall of the Grenville Chapel and is decorated with Corinthian columns and carved military trophies.

== Cornish wrestling ==
Cornish wrestling tournaments, for prizes, were held in Kilkhampton in the 1800s.

== Notable residents ==
See also People from Kilkhampton

- Sir Bevil Grenville (1596–1643), Royalist commander in the Civil War.
- Baron Granville a title created twice, in 1661 and 1703
- James Yeo (1789–1868), shipbuilder, merchant, farmer and political figure in Prince Edward Island.
- Henry Robinson (1819–1887), local Rector in the 1850s
- Thomas Greenway (1838–1908), Premier of the Canadian province of Manitoba until 1908.
- Minnie Pallister (1885–1960), a political writer and activist, self-described "Socialist propagandist" and unsuccessful political candidate
- Adelaide Phillpotts (1896–1993), the novelist, poet and playwright, lived in Kilkhampton following her marriage in 1952.
- Phil Vickery (born 1976), the England rugby union captain grew up in the village, he played about 200 games and 73 for England, his family still own a substantial amount of the surrounding farmland
