= Trengove =

Trengove is a surname. Notable people with the surname include:

- Jack Trengove (born 1991), Australian rules footballer
- Jackson Trengove (born 1990), Australian rules footballer
- John Trengove (disambiguation)
- Henry Trengove (by 1521–1561), Cornish politician
- Wim Trengove (born 1949), South African advocate
