= Beville (surname) =

Beville is a surname. Notable people with the surname include:

- Monte Beville (1875–1955), American baseball player
- Ben Beville (1877–1937), American baseball player
- Stephen Beville, English composer and pianist
- Liam Beville, Irish Powerlifter and Guinness Record holder
- Thomas Beville (disambiguation), multiple people
