= Trewynnard =

Trewynnard may refer to:

- William Trewynnard, Member (MP) of the Parliament of England for Helston in 1542.
- James Trewynnard, Member (MP) of the Parliament of England for Liskeard 1529, Newport, Cornwall 1547 and Penryn November 1554.

== See also ==
- Elizabeth Trewinnard
- Trewinnard
