= Thomas Beville =

Thomas Beville may refer to:

- Thomas Beville (MP for Helston) in 1397, MP for Helston
- Thomas Beville (MP for Huntingdonshire), 1413–1417, MP for Huntingdonshire
