= Richard Heywood =

Richard Heywood may refer to:

- Richard Heywood (bishop) (1867–1955), Anglican bishop
- Richard Heywood (MP), member of parliament for Helston in 1545
- Richard Heywood (actor) in The 14

== See also ==
- T. R. H. Thomson (Richard Heywood Thomson), English explorer and naturalist
- Dick Heyward, deputy executive director of UNICEF between 1949 and 1981
