= John Baker (Helston MP) =

English politician

John Baker (died c. 1421) was an English politician. He sat as MP for Helston in November 1414.

He married a woman called Juliana and they had one son.
