= John Jope Rogers =

British barrister, author and MP for Helston

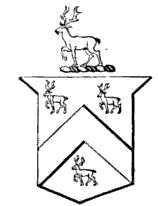
- The arms of the Rogers family of Penrose
- Born: 16 February 1816
- Died: 24 April 1880 (aged 64)
- Education: Trinity College, Oxford University
- Occupations: Barrister, Inner Temple
- Spouse: Maria Hichens
- Children: Margaret Hichens; Mary Ellen; John Peverell
- Parent(s): Mary Jope and John Rogers

John Jope Rogers (16 February 1816 – 24 April 1880) was the owner of Penrose, a house and estate near the Cornish town of Helston. The estate included Loe Pool, the largest lake in Cornwall, now owned by the National Trust. He was also an author and Conservative MP for Helston, Cornwall from 1859 to 1865.

== Life ==
Rogers was born, in the vicarage at Mawnan on 16 February 1816, to the Reverend John Rogers (1778–1856) and Mary Jope (died 1837). The eldest of five sons, he inherited the estate of Penrose on 12 June 1856, following the death of his father. Part of this estate between Helston and Porthleven, and including Loe Pool, is now owned by the National Trust. His brother Henry (1824–1912), a naval officer, was father of Leonard Rogers.

Rogers was educated at Shrewsbury School. He matriculated at Trinity College, Oxford in 1834 and graduated BA in 1838. In 1841 he took his MA. In 1842 he was called to the bar at the Inner Temple.

From 1859 to 1865, Rogers was Member of Parliament for Helston. He was also Chairman of the old Cornwall Quarter Sessions, a Deputy Lieutenant of Cornwall, president of the Helston Bank and president of the Royal Institution of Cornwall.

Rogers granted a mining lease to John Hunt, for the disused Wheal Rose lead mine on the Penrose estate, allowing superficial works and later access to the lower levels. Hunt started work around 1860, and a cost-book company was set up around 1864 to finance a steam-engine for the deeper work, with a mining sett that included the nearby Wheal Penrose and Wheal Unity mines. Wheal Rose and Wheal Unity were failed projects of the late 1830s of the company promoter William Millett Thomas.

Rogers died on 24 April 1880 and was the second person to be buried in the family vault in Sithney churchyard which was dug in 1856, following the death of his father.

== Works ==
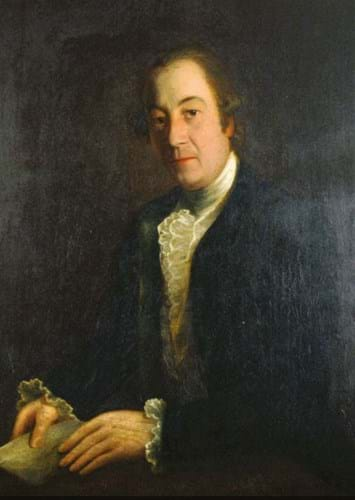
John Knill, portrait by John Opie

Rogers published in 1878 a catalogue of the paintings of the Cornish artist John Opie, Opie and His Works. It included a short biography. John Enys was a collaborator in this work, and unpublished notes of Rogers were used in Ada Earland's John Opie and his Circle of 1911.

One of Opie's sitters was John Knill (1733–1811), related to the Hichens family into which Rogers married. He possessed Knill's portrait by Opie, and wrote a short life of him. It was published in 1871 by Cunnack of Helston (anonymous).

Another catalogue by Rogers related to the works of the Bone family, including Henry Bone and Henry Pierce Bone, miniature and enamel painters. It was published in the Journal of the Royal Institution of Cornwall in 1880.

== Family ==
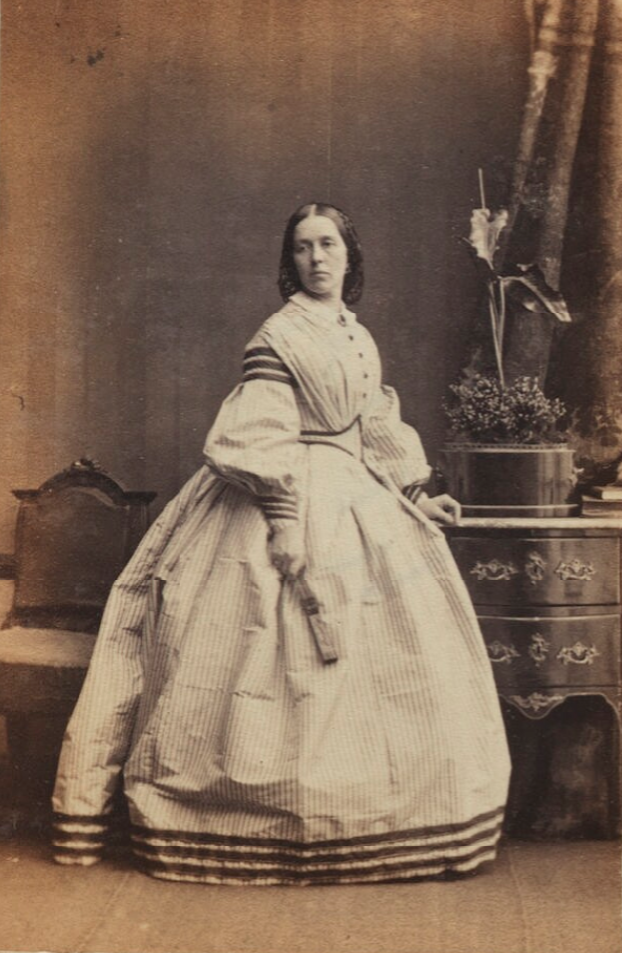
Maria Rogers, 1861 photograph

Rogers married Maria Hichens (baptised 13 March 1822, died 1911, aged 89), the eldest daughter of William Hichens, Esq of Camberwell Grove at Camberwell in 1844. Her father was a London stockbroker from a Cornish family, awarded compensation for enslaved people on an estate in Antigua; and an investor in the London and Brighton Railway.

The marriage produced four daughters and nine sons:

1. Margaret Hichens (died 16 January 1939), married 1878 Henry Dyke Acland, son of Henry Acland.
2. Mary Ellen, married 1874 John Cole (1844–1910), son of John Cole Dicker.
3. Maria Maude, married 1883 Charles Hugh Everard, Assistant Master at Eton.
4. Catherine Elizabeth, died 1866.
5. John Peverell (born 7 November 1846 – 21 August 1928), a captain in the Royal Regiment of Artillery.
6. Charles Fursdon (born 1848), cleric.
7. Reginald (born 1851).
8. Andrew Trevarthian (1853–1880), did not marry.
9. Robert Henry (born 1855). He died 28 November 1881, aged 26, on his voyage home from India.
10. Philip Powys (born 1857).
11. Frederick Evelyn (born 1860). He died 17 August 1936, aged 75.
12. Francis Bassett (born 1862).
13. Walter (born 1864), youngest son.

Parliament of the United Kingdom
Preceded by Charles Trueman	Member of Parliament for Helston; 1859 – 1865	Succeeded by Adolphus William Young
