= J. A. Stargardt =

Berlin-based antiquarian bookshop

J. A. Stargardt GmbH & Co. KG is a Berlin-based antiquarian bookshop and auction house that specializes in autograph and manuscript trading. Founded in 1830, it is the oldest autograph shop in the world and, according to Süddeutsche Zeitung, "probably the most important house in the world for collectors, archives, libraries and museums".

== History ==
J. A. Stargardt was founded as a book and sheet music store in 1830 and taken over in 1847 by Joseph A. Stargardt and Paul Julius Reuter. Reuter left the company in 1849 and founded the Reuter'sches Telegraphenbureau, later to become the globally renowned Reuters news agency. Stargardt began to concentrate on antiquarian books and, especially, on trade in autograph letters and manuscripts. While there is evidence of commercial autograph trading as early as 1822 in France and the mid-1830s in England, Stargardt was one of the pioneers of the trade in German-speaking Europe. It is globally the only company from the founding period of autograph trading still active today.

Since 1885, J. A. Stargardt is owned by the Mecklenburg family. Günther Mecklenburg, who directed the company from 1924 to the mid 1970s, is the author of Vom Autographensammeln, regarded as the fundamental guide to autograph trading and its history in the German-speaking countries, and first president of the Association of German Antiquarian Booksellers (Verband Deutscher Antiquare, VDA). Since 1988, J. A. Stargardt is managed by his grandson Wolfgang Mecklenburg.

=== Auctions ===
Joseph A. Stargardt began organizing autograph auctions in 1859 and, with the exception of World Wars I and II, the company has done so regularly ever since. As of 2023, J. A. Stargardt has published more than 700 stock and auction catalogs. Today, the auctions usually take place in spring in Berlin. The auctions are regularly announced and discussed in the national and international trade and public media.

In the field of music in particular, J. A. Stargardt has been able to sell rare manuscripts and notations at high prices. The highest hammer price at a Stargardt auction, 500,000 Euros, was paid in 2015 for the autograph manuscript of George Frideric Handel’s chamber trio “Se tu non lasci amore” (HWV 201a) from 1708. In 2011, 111 letters and cards from Franz Kafka to his sister Ottla were conveyed to the German Literature Archive in Marbach and the Bodleian Library in Oxford.

=== Memberships ===
J. A. Stargardt is a member of the Association of German Antiquarians (VDA), the International League of Antiquarian Booksellers (ILAB), the Federal Association of German Art Auctioneers (BDK), The Manuscript Society (MS) and the Universal Autograph Collectors Club (UACC).
