= Robert Trewick Bone =

English painter

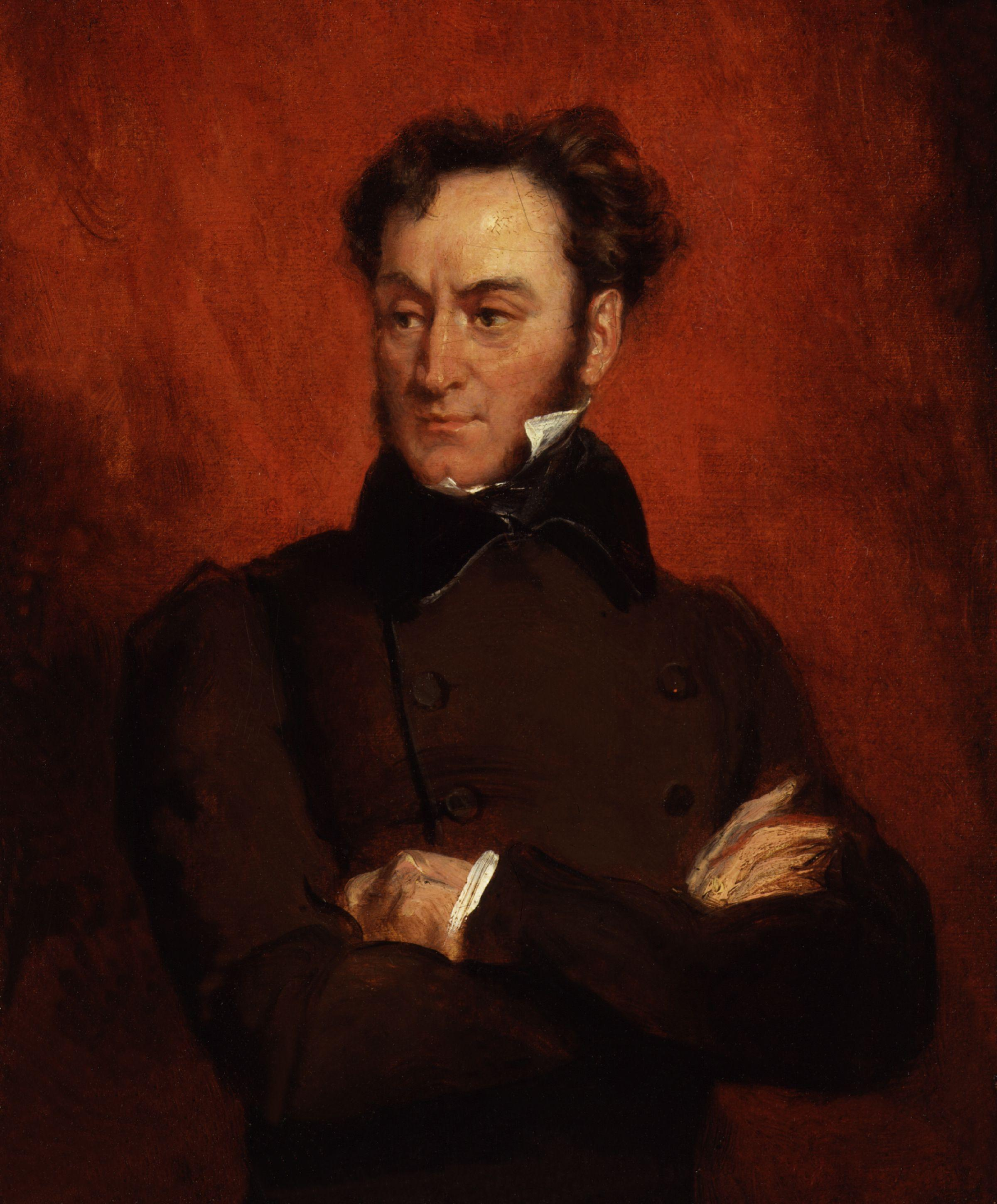
- Born: 24 September 1790; London
- Died: 5 May 1840 (aged 49)
- Occupation: Painter

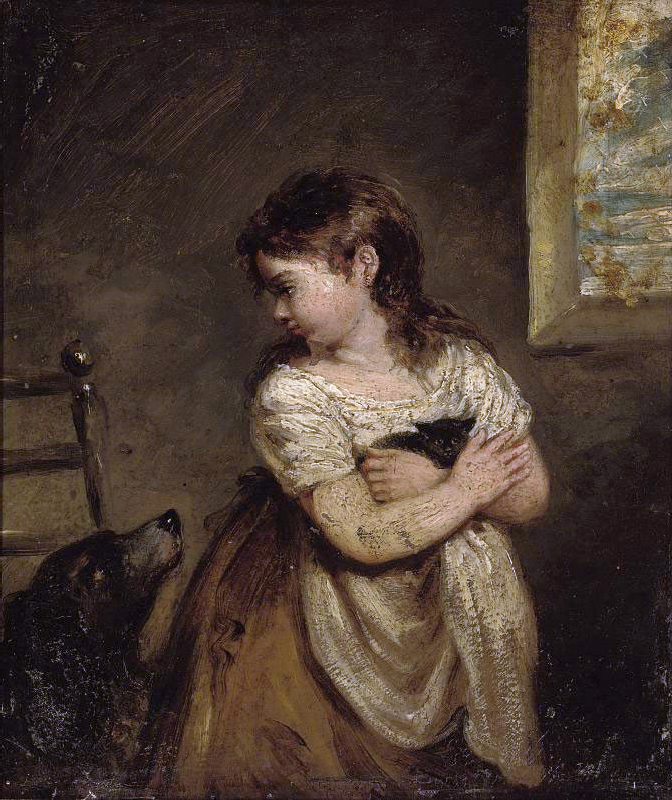
Girl holding a kitten (1818, oil on copper)

Robert Trewick Bone (24 September 1790 – 5 May 1840) was an English painter of sacred, classical and genre scenes. He was also an enamel painter.

== Life and work ==
Bone was born in London, the son (and one of 10 surviving children) of Henry Bone, the celebrated enamel painter, who instructed him in art, and younger brother of Henry Pierce Bone (1779–1855), also an enamel painter.

He exhibited 46 times at the Royal Academy starting in 1813, until 1837. In 1817 he won a premium of £100 from the British Institution for his painting of A lady with her attendants at the bath. His work was almost exclusively in oils, confining himself almost exclusively to sacred, classic, and domestic subjects. His works, though generally small, are tasteful and sparkling, and he was a member of the Sketching Club.

Bone died from the effects of an accident on 5 May 1840.
