= John Holdiche =

16th-century English politician

John Holdiche (by 1508 – 1536), of Yealmbridge, Devon, was an English politician.

He was a member (MP) of the parliament of England for Helston in 1529.
