= John Basset (writer) =

John Basset (17 November 1791 – 4 July 1843) was a writer on Cornish mining. He was deeply interested in Cornish mining, mining technology and economics.

Born at Illogan in Cornwall, he published an article in 1840 drawing attention to the devices called "Man Engines" for mechanically raising and lowering mine workers up and down the mine-shaft, replacing many yards of ladders. These devices were known to operate in the Harz Mountains in Germany. The Royal Cornwall Polytechnic Society (which had published the paper), offered a prize for a version suitable for use in Cornish mines, which was won by Michael Loam.

Basset was High Sheriff of Cornwall in 1837, and MP for Helston in 1840–41.

He died at Boppard am Rhein, Germany, on 4 July 1843 aged 51.

== See also ==
- Baron Basset
- Great Cornish Families
- Tehidy Country Park

Parliament of the United Kingdom
Preceded by Viscount Cantelupe	Member of Parliament for Helston; 1840–1841	Succeeded by Sir Richard Vyvyan, Bt
