= John Trengove =

John Trengove may refer to:

- John Trengove (judge) (1919–2020), South African lawyer and judge
- John Trengove (politician) (fl. 1547), English politician
- John Trengove (director) (born 1978), South African director
