= Edward Bray (died 1581) =

English Member of Parliament (c.1519–1581)

Sir Edward Bray (c. 1519 – 1581) was an English politician.

He was a member of the Parliament of England for Helston in 1571. He was the son of Sir Edward Bray.
