= Henry Bone =

British artist (1755–1834)

Henry Bone RA
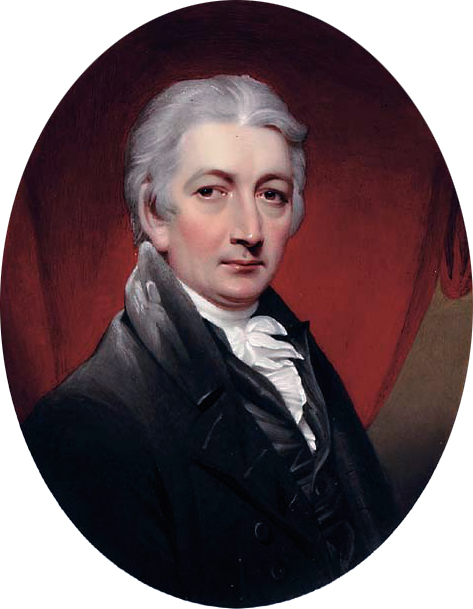
- Portrait of Henry Bone by his son Henry Pierce Bone
- Born: 6 February 1755; Truro, Cornwall, England, Kingdom of Great Britain
- Died: 17 December 1834 (aged 79)
- Known for: oil portraits; enamel
- Spouse: Elizabeth Vandermeulen
- Children: Henry Pierce Bone; Robert Trewick Bone; Several others
- Patrons: George III; George IV; William IV

Henry Bone RA (6 February 1755 – 17 December 1834) was an English enamel painter. By c. 1800 he had attracted royal patronage for his portrait miniatures This patronage continued throughout the reigns of three monarchs; George III, George IV and William IV. In his early career he worked as a porcelain and jewellry painter. He was elected a Royal Academician and produced the largest enamel paintings ever seen up to that time.

== Life and work ==
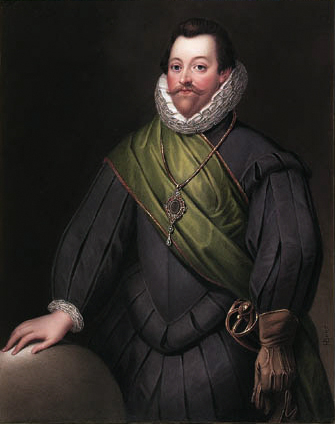
Francis Drake

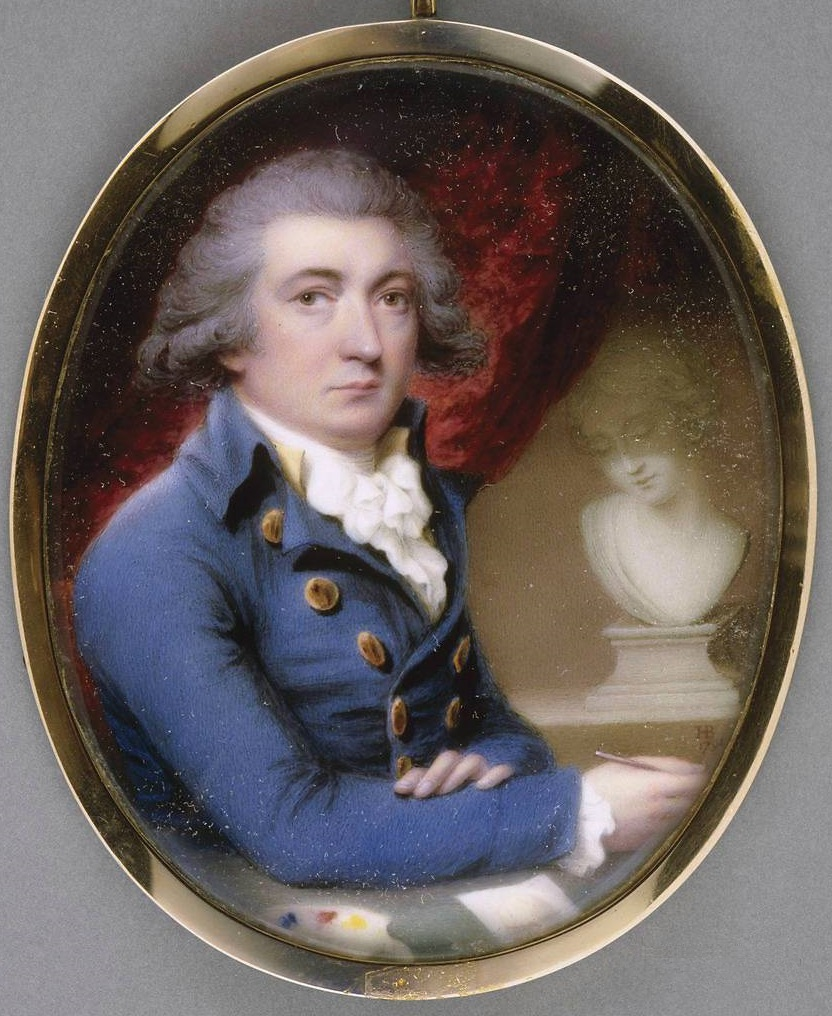
Self-portrait by Bone, 1791

Henry Bone was born in Truro, Cornwall. His father was a cabinet maker and carver of unusual skill. In 1767, Bone's family moved to Plymouth in neighbouring Devon, where Henry was employed, in 1771, by William Cookworthy, the founder of the Plymouth porcelain works and the first manufacturer of Hard-paste porcelain in England. Later in the same year Bone moved with the factory to Bristol, where then factory was under the management of Richard Champion of Bristol. In 1772, Bone was apprenticed to Champion, not to Cookworthy as often repeated. He remained for six years, working from 6 a.m. to 6 p.m., and studying drawing at night. His china decoration can be assumed to be of high merit, and is said by one Victorian writer to have been marked with the figure "1" in addition to the factory-mark, a small cross. This attribution is speculative, however, as are a number of alternative suggestions for what work he carried out at Bristol.

On the failure of the Bristol works in 1778, Bone came to London with one guinea of his own in his pocket, and five pounds borrowed from a friend. He first found employment enameling watches and fans, and afterwards in making enamel and watercolour portraits. He became a friend of John Wolcot who would also encourage the talents of portraitist John Opie, for many years Bone's neighbour in Berners Street, London. On Wolcot's advice, Bone made professional tours in Cornwall, from where Opie also hailed. Wolcot had been a visitor often at the house of William Cookworthy, and in 1780 Opie painted Cookworthy.

On 24 January 1779, just four days after the expiry of his apprenticeship deed, Bone married Elizabeth Vandermeulen, a descendant of the distinguished battle-painter Adam Frans van der Meulen. The couple went on to have ten children, moving regularly to accommodate their growing family. In 1781 he exhibited his first picture at the Royal Academy, a portrait of his wife, an unusually large enamel for the period. He then gave himself up entirely to enamel-painting, and continued frequently to exhibit at the Academy, initialing most of his works.

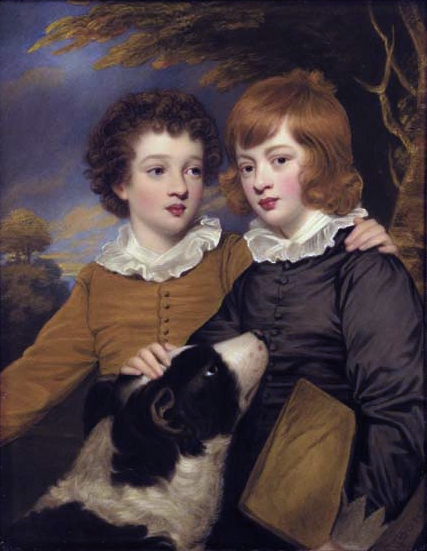
Henry Gawler (1766–1852) and his brother John Bellenden Ker (1765–1842) (after Joshua Reynolds)

In 1789, he exhibited "A Muse and Cupid", the largest enamel painting ever executed up to that time. In 1800 he was appointed enamel painter to the Prince of Wales; in 1801 he was made an associate of the Royal Academy (ARA) and enamel painter to George III, continuing to hold the appointment during the reigns of George IV and William IV. On 15 April 1811 he was elected a royal academician (RA), and shortly afterwards produced a still larger enamel (eighteen inches by sixteen), after Titian's Bacchus and Ariadne. More than 4000 people saw the work at Bone's house. The picture was sold to Mr. G. Bowles of Cavendish Square for 2,200 guineas, whilst the original Titian, borrowed by Bone for copying, was only insured for £1500. The price was paid (either wholly or partly) by a cheque drawn on Fauntleroy's Bank. Bone cashed the cheque on his way home, apparently just in time, as it is said that the next day financial difficulties caused the bank to suspend payments!

Bone initially used a subcontractor, Mr. Long, to created the copper plates upon which his works were created. Subsequently he decided to take over this task himself, and in learning to prepare his large plates, he was assisted by Edward Wedlake Brayley, who was by then already a distinguished antiquary, but had trained as an enameller.

Bone's next great works were a series of historical portraits from the time of Elizabeth I, a series of "Cavaliers distinguished in the Civil War", and a series of portraits of the Russell family. Some say that the Elizabethan series did not prove a financial success, but they were painted over a 20 year period with time set aside each year to borrow and make preparatory drawings from original paintings. It may thus have been regarded by Bone as a legacy project and at the time of his death 85 remained at his house at 15 Berners Street. In 1832 his eyesight failed, and after having lived at Berners Street for 31 years, he moved in that year to a smaller property in Somers Town, reluctantly applying for, and receiving, a Royal Academy pension.

He died on 17 December 1834, not without complaining of the neglect with which he had latterly been treated. He is said to have been "a man of unaffected modesty and generosity; friendship and integrity adorned his private life". Francis Chantrey carved a bust of him, and John Opie, John Jackson, and George Harlow all painted his portrait. In 1819, Bone had attended the funeral of Harlow alongside their friend Sir William Beechey. Richard Dagley was another friend.

== Legacy ==
Some time before his death Bone offered his collections, which had been valued at £10,000, to the nation for £4,000, but the offer was declined, and on 22 April 1836 they were sold by auction at Christie's, and so dispersed. Other major sales of his works took place in 1846, 1850, 1854, and 1856.

Today the largest collections of Bone's work are to be found in three principal locations. The Royal Collection houses many portraits, the largest number from a series of Monarchs started by Bone and finished by his son Henry Pierce Bone, are housed at Hillsborough Castle near Belfast. Portraits of the Russell family are at Woburn (currently closed) and a significant number of the historical portraits are at Kingston Lacey, Dorset, a National Trust property.

Bone has been called the "Prince of Enamelers". J. Jope Rogers published a large catalogue of 1,063 works of the Bone family in the Journal of the Royal Institution of Cornwall, No. XXII, for March 1880 - half of which was taken up by works by Henry Bone. This list is reproduced in the recent book (Panes, 2025, see below)

The 1951 Festival of Britain saw a number of Bone's enamels lent by King George VI and others to the museum in Truro for an exhibition of Bone's miniatures alongside the portraits of his friend John Opie. The two men were neighbours in Berners Street, London and hailed from the Cornwall region. The Royal Institution of Cornwall presented portraiture from the two artists which were "gathered from all over the country" with the King also loaning his Opie portraits to the museum for the exhibition. Henry Bone remains the only enameller to have been appointed a full member of the Royal Academy.

== Family ==
Two of his sons, Henry Pierce Bone and William Bone, were also notable enamellists and Robert Trewick Bone, an oil painter. Another son, Thomas Bone, was a midshipman who was wrecked and drowned during the attempted rescue of sailors from the sloop called Racehorse off the Isle of Man, while yet another, Peter Bone, was a lieutenant in the 36th Regiment, who was wounded at the Battle of Toulouse and died soon after returning to England. A sixth son was called to the bar. Four of Bone's grandchildren followed their father, Henry Pierce Bone and became artists, the most notable being Charles Richard Bone who exhibited enamel and other miniatures at the Royal Academy more than 40 times.

== Gallery ==
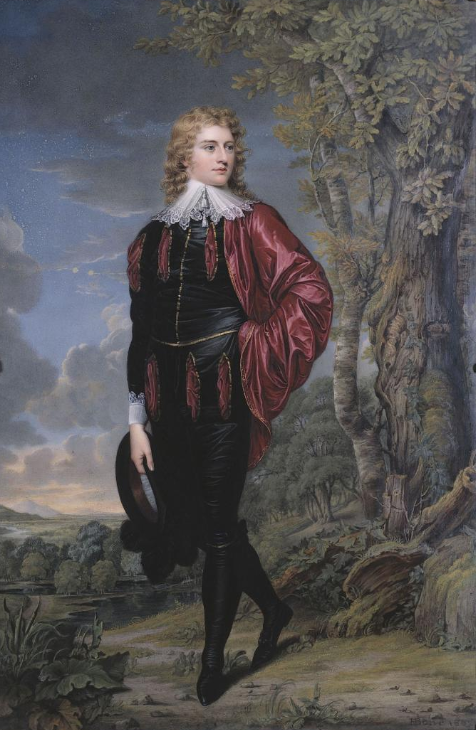
Henry Philip Hope (1802)

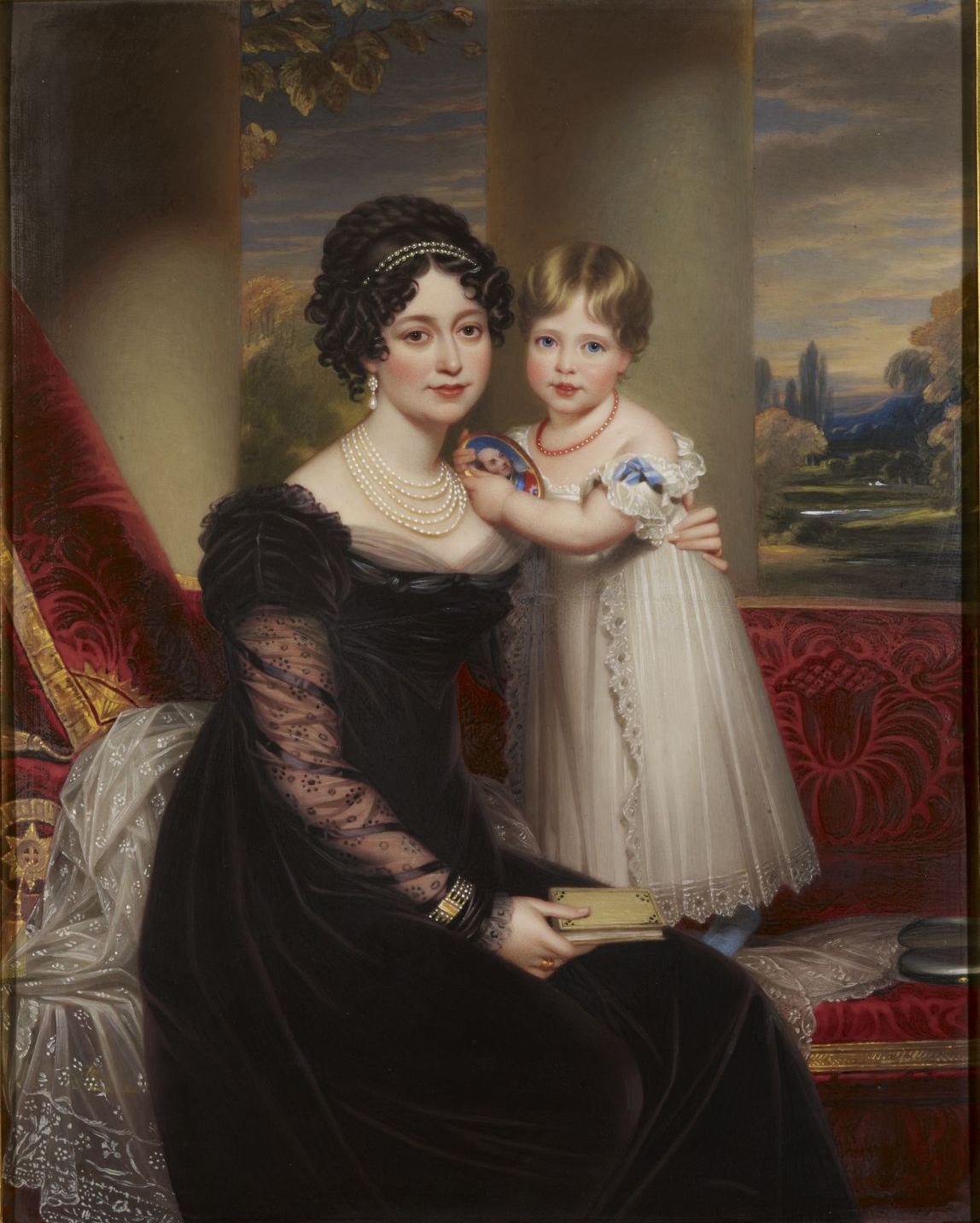
Duchess of Kent and Victoria (1824/5) after the 1821 painting by William Beechey

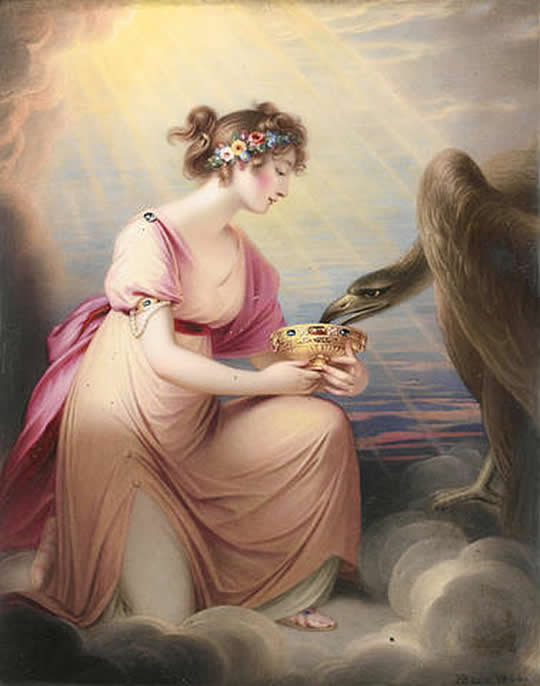
Sophia Lady Burrell as Hebe (1804)

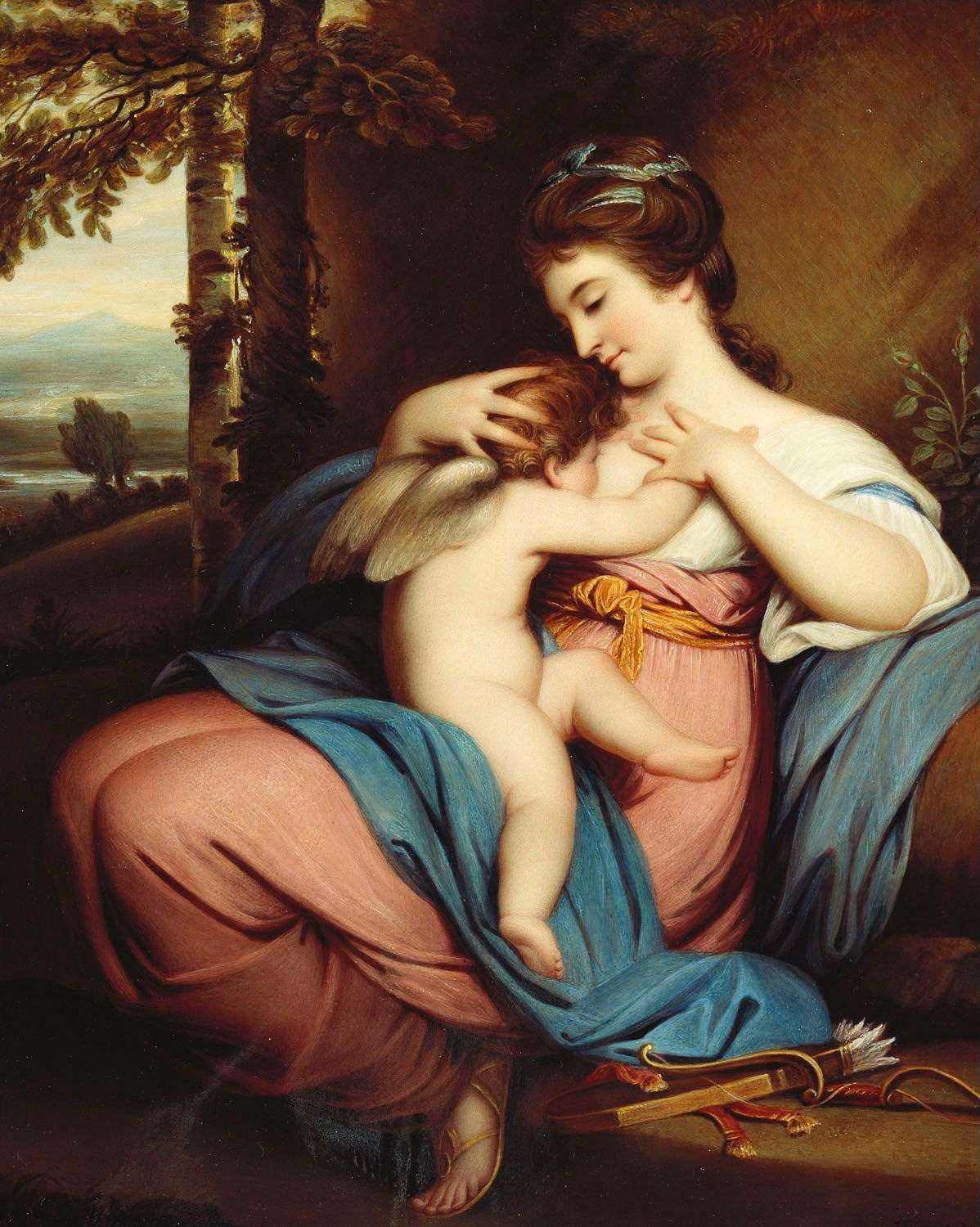
Hope nursing Love (1808)

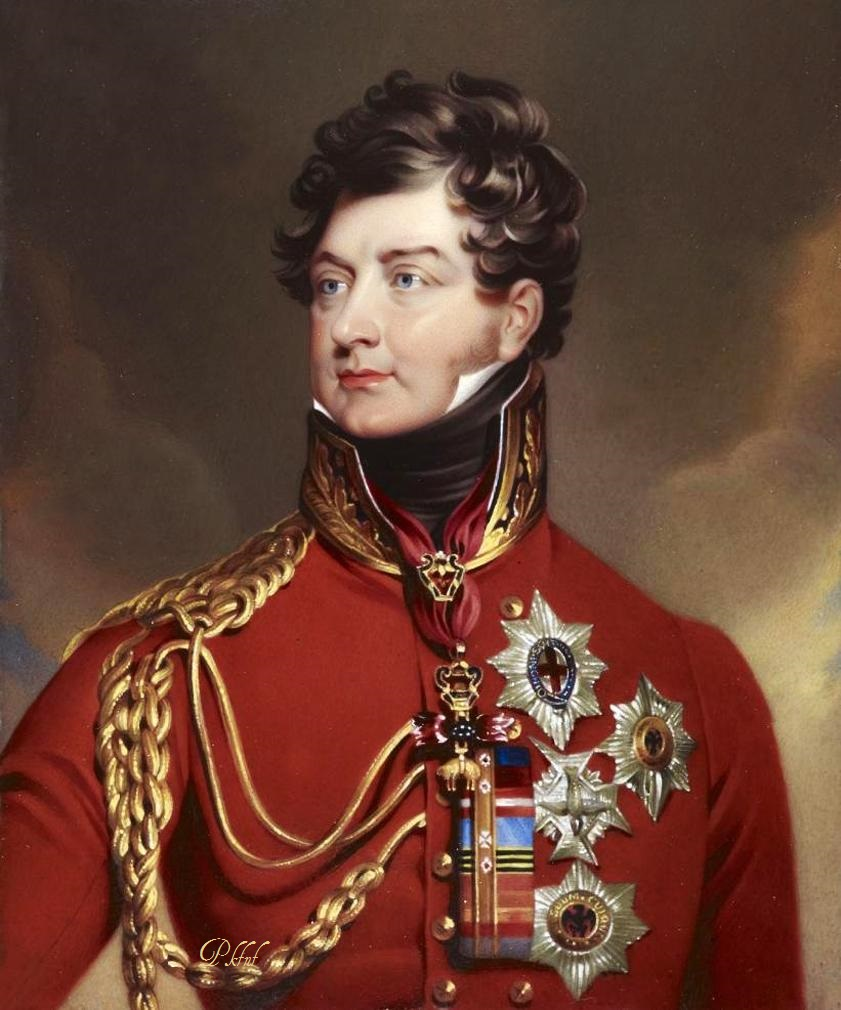
King George IV when Prince Regent (1762-1830), after Lawrence
