= 1866 Helston by-election =

UK parliament by-election in 1866

- 1 May 1866

Constituency of Helston
| Candidate | William Baliol Brett | Robert Campbell |
| Party | Conservative | Liberal |
| Popular vote | 153 | 152 |
| Percentage | 50.2% | 49.8% |
MP before election
A. W. Young
Liberal
Subsequent MP
William Baliol Brett
Conservative

A by-election was held on 1 May 1866 to return an MP for the constituency of Helston, England. The by-election was caused by the declaration that Adolphus Young's election in the 1865 United Kingdom general election was null and void due to bribery. Two candidates contested the election: Robert Campbell for the Liberal Party and William Baliol Brett for the Conservatives. On the original count, both candidates received 153 votes but Campbell was declared the winner after Thomas Rogers—the mayor of Helston, who was serving as the returning officer—made a casting vote in his favour.

The decision was appealed, and upon scrutiny, Brett was declared the winner after it was found that Campbell had received a vote from a local clergyman who did not have the right to vote due to a lack of residency. This election led to Parliament deciding that in future, if an equal number of votes were recorded for two or more candidates at an election, all such candidates should be elected.

== Background ==
=== Vacancy ===
At the 1865 United Kingdom general election, Adolphus William Young, representing the Liberal Party, had been elected as the Member of Parliament for the Helston constituency. He defeated the Conservative candidate, Major Shadwell Morley Grylls by 154 votes to 144. In the immediate aftermath, a report in the Royal Cornwall Gazette said that the result had been a surprise, and alleged that "certain measures ... were adopted to induce men to break their solemn pledges". A succession of letters were published over the subsequent weeks from representatives of both candidates, making a series of allegations and counter-allegations. In February 1866, a petition was presented to Parliament by three Helston constituents, accusing Young of "acts of bribery and corruption" during the election. At the subsequent hearing in April, Mr W. H. Cooke—counsel for the petitioners—announced that Young had accepted that without his knowledge, some of his representatives had been guilty of bribery, and he would not contest the charge. By agreement, only one witness was called, and the committee chairman agreed it was sufficient to report the election void.

=== Candidates and campaigning ===
The West Briton & Cornwall Advertiser reported that part of the agreement made by Young was that the resulting by-election would be contested by two new candidates, and as a result, neither he nor Major Grylls were presented as candidates. The Liberal Party put forward Robert Campbell, who had previously served as High Sheriff of Berkshire, while the Conservatives were represented by William Baliol Brett, a Queen's Counsel on the Northern Circuit. Brett had previously stood as a Conservative candidate in the 1865 Rochdale by-election, which he lost by 646 votes to 496.

Only a short period was allowed for campaigning; the seat had been vacated on 18 April, and the resulting by-election was held on 1 May. In a letter published in The West Briton & Cornwall Advertiser, Campbell said his "political opinions are in the main identical" to Young's. He supported the Liberal government, and specifically supported the electoral Reform Bill and the abolition of church rates. Brett similarly described himself as having views typical of the Conservative Party at the time. He opposed the Reform Bill as presented, suggesting that it would "give an unfair and predominating influence to the working classes".

== Result ==
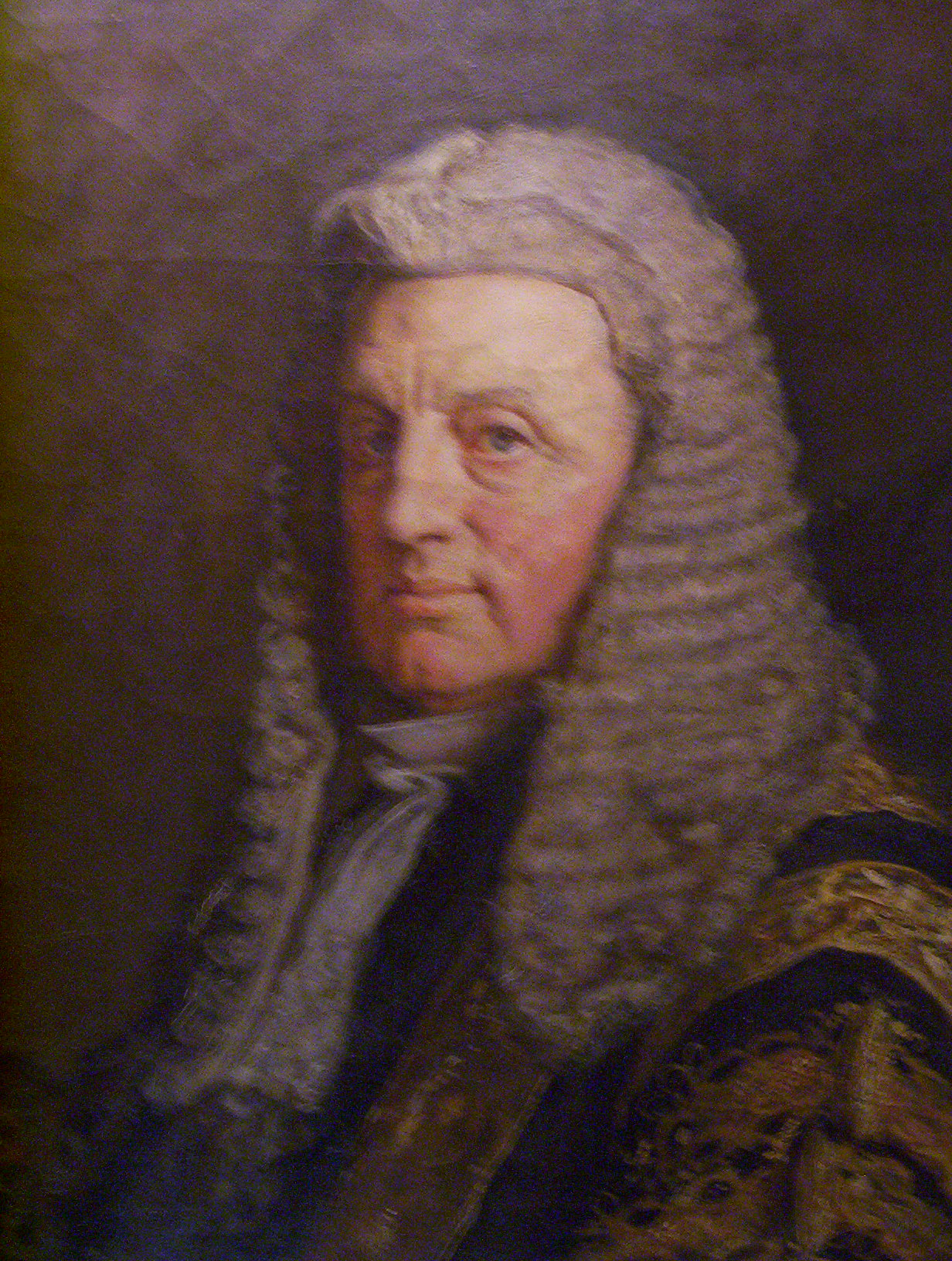
William Baliol Brett (painted later in life, c. 1885–1890) was elected after petitioning the original by-election result.

The nominations took place on Monday 30 April at Helston Town Hall; Brett was proposed by the previous Conservative candidate, Grylls, while Campbell was proposed by C. W. Popham. Campbell won more support in a "show of hands", upon which Brett requested a poll which was determined for the following day. Three polling stations were established; constituents based in the town of Helston itself would vote at the town hall, while booths were also set up at either end of the town for those electors from Wendron and Sithney. Voting commenced at 8 am, and by 10 am, 233 of the 348 registered electors had voted; at that stage, Campbell held a three-vote lead. In the late morning, both sides made an effort to round up those who had not yet voted, and at midday Campbell led by 138–134. Voting was much quieter throughout the afternoon, and by the end of the vote at 4 pm it was evident that the result was close; the Conservatives believed that they had won by a single vote.

When the results were announced, Thomas Rogers—the town mayor, who was acting as returning officer—announced that both candidates had received 153 votes. Campbell had gained the majority in Helston itself (79–62), but Brett had the advantage in both the outlying villages (31–28 in Wendron and 60–46 in Sithney). Rogers, who was a Liberal supporter and had already voted for Campbell in the poll, opined that he was not sure whether he held a casting vote, but said that "believing it to be the proper course, I shall give my casting vote for Mr Campbell." Objections immediately ensued from both sides. The Liberals complained that at 3:56 pm a voter, Martin, had been prevented from casting a vote for their candidate by the Conservatives "taking possession" of the hall. For their part, the Conservatives rejected this charge, and that by law the Mayor did not hold a casting vote. The town's deputy clerk then formally declared Campbell the elected member for Helston.

Campbell was sworn in on 7 May, taking up his seat in the House of Commons. A couple of days later, Brett presented a petition to the House of Commons. In addition to his complaint that the mayor should not have made a casting vote, he also alleged that some of the voters were not "properly qualified", and that a vote was cast after 4 pm, when the vote should have closed. The petition hearing was held on 3 July. After an initial confirmation of the original, tied result, a Wesleyan minister was called upon. The Reverend Isaac Rogers gave evidence that he had voted, despite no longer residing in the house he had previously occupied in the constituency, in the belief he was still eligible to do so. The hearing committee, as a result, amended the result of the poll to remove Reverend Rogers' vote, and as a result Brett was elected as the Member of Parliament for Helston.

1866 Helston by-election
| Party | Candidate | Votes | % | ±% |
|---|---|---|---|---|
| Conservative | William Baliol Brett | 153 | 50.2 | +1.9 |
| Liberal | Robert Campbell | 152 | 49.8 | −1.9 |
| Majority | | 1 | 0.4 | N/A |
| Turnout | | 305 | 87.6 | +2.0 |
| Registered electors | | 348 | | |
| Conservative gain from Liberal | | Swing | +1.9 | |

== Aftermath ==
This election led to Parliament deciding that "according to the law and usage of Parliament, it is the duty of the sheriff or other returning officer in England, in the case of an equal number of votes being polled for two or more candidates at an election, to return all such candidates". Per convention, Brett vacated his seat upon his appointment as Solicitor General in February 1868, but was subsequently re-elected unopposed in a by-election; two candidates initially stood against him but withdrew after appeals from their own party members to wait until the general election later that year. In August 1868, Brett was appointed as Justice of the Court of Common Pleas, and he once again vacated his seat. Shortly thereafter at the 1868 general election, Adolphus William Young was elected by a vote of 494 to 374.

== See also ==
- List of United Kingdom by-elections (1857–1868)
- Casting vote
