= Marguerite, Baroness de Reuter =

European aristocrat

Marguerite, Baroness de Reuter (14 July 1912 – 25 January 2009) was a European aristocrat and the last surviving member of the family that founded the Reuters news service. She was the wife of Oliver, 4th Baron de Reuter, whose grandfather, Paul Reuter, established the Reuters news service in London in 1851. Paul Reuter, a Jew who settled in the United Kingdom and converted to Christianity, had previously begun his career in journalism in Aachen, Germany, using carrier pigeons and telegraphs.

== Biography ==
=== Early life and title ===
She was born on 14 July 1912, the daughter of George Uehlinger of Neunkirch, Switzerland. A patron of the arts, she was a champion of her family's links with Reuters News Agency, and of her British citizenship, which she acquired through marriage to her husband, Oliver, 4th Baron de Reuter. She and her husband had no children, and she was a widow for the last 40 years of her life.

The title that her husband bore had been created on 7 September 1871, when the German Duke of Saxe-Coburg and Gotha granted the noble title of Freiherr (Baron) to Paul Reuter, her grandfather-in-law. In November 1891, Queen Victoria granted Paul Reuter (and his subsequent male-line successors) the right to use that German title (listed as "Baron von Reuter") in Britain. The title became extinct upon the death of her husband, the 4th Baron, since there was no male heir.

=== Final years ===
She suffered from a series of successive strokes late in 2008. She died at the age of 96 on Sunday 25 January 2009 at a French nursing home near the border with Monaco.

Tom Glocer, the chief executive of Thomson Reuters at that time, released a statement upon Marguerite's death, saying: "Although the founding family of Reuters were no longer significant shareholders in the company, the baroness did notably attend a service at St Bride's Church, London, to mark Reuters' historic move from Fleet Street to Canary Wharf in 2005."

Reuters News Agency moved out of its headquarters on Fleet Street in 2005. The company became part of Thomson Reuters plc in 2008.

== Personal life ==
Her personal interests, especially in the arts, continued well into her later years. She continued to ski until her 70s and was known to be fluent in several languages. Her hobbies included Bridge, as well as attending opera and ballet.
