= Edward Aysshton =

Member of the Parliament of England

Edward Aysshton (died 3 July 1481) was an English politician and lawyer who was MP for Truro in 1467 and Taunton in 1472 and 1477/78, and recorder of Launceston (1460-1478). He was the only surviving son of Nicholas Aysshton.
