= Adolphus William Young =

Australian politician

Adolphus William Young (1814 – 4 November 1885) was an English solicitor who spent some years in New South Wales and became a member of the New South Wales Legislative Council. He returned to England, where he was a Liberal Party politician who sat in the House of Commons variously between 1857 and 1880.

== Life and career ==
Young was the son of John Adolphus Young of Hare Hatch Lodge, in the parish of Wargrave, Berkshire and his wife Frances Haggard daughter of William Haggard, of Braham Hall, Norfolk. Young went to New South Wales where he practised for some years as a solicitor in Sydney. He was High Sheriff of New South Wales from October 1842 to 1849 and became a director of the Australasian Colonial and General Life Assurance Company in 1844. Young was a representative for the Port Phillip District in the Legislative Council before Victoria was formed into a separate colony. He returned to England and was a J.P. and Deputy Lieutenant for Berkshire.

Young was first elected British Member of Parliament (MP) for Great Yarmouth in 1857 but lost the seat in 1859. He was elected MP for Helston at the 1865 general election but his election was declared void on 18 April 1866 and a by-election held. He was re-elected MP for Helston at the 1868 general election and held the seat until 1880.

Young died at the age of 71.

== Personal life ==
Young married firstly Ann Eliza Smith, daughter of Edward Smith of Woodford Wells, Essex in 1837. Ann died in 1845 and he married secondly in 1847, Jane Throsby, daughter of Charles Throsby of Throsby Park, New South Wales.

New South Wales Legislative Council
Preceded by Charles Ebden	Member for Port Phillip; 1844–1845; Served alongside: Thomas Walker, Charles Nicholson; Thomas Mitchell, John Dunmore Lang	Succeeded by Thomas Boyd
Parliament of the United Kingdom
Preceded by William Torrens McCullagh; Edward Watkin	Member of Parliament for Great Yarmouth; 1857–1859; With: John Mellor	Succeeded by Sir Edmund Lacon, Bt; Sir Henry Stracey, Bt
Preceded by John Jope Rogers	Member of Parliament for Helston; 1865–1866	Succeeded by Robert Campbell
Preceded by Sir William Brett	Member of Parliament for Helston; 1868–1880	Succeeded by William Molesworth-St Aubyn
