= A Dispatch from Reuters =

1940 film by William Dieterle

- 1940 theatrical poster
- Directed by: William Dieterle
- Written by: Valentine Williams (story); Wolfgang Wilhelm (story); Milton Krims
- Produced by: Hal B. Wallis (exec. producer); Henry Blanke (assoc. producer)
- Starring: Edward G. Robinson; Edna Best
- Cinematography: James Wong Howe
- Edited by: Warren Low
- Music by: Max Steiner
- Distributed by: Warner Bros. Pictures
- Release dates: September 18, 1940 (Preview); October 29, 1940 (Los Angeles); December 11, 1940 (New York City)
- Running time: 89–90 minutes
- Country: United States
- Language: English

A Dispatch from Reuters (displayed as A Dispatch from Reuter's [sic] in the film's title sequence) is a 1940 biographical film about Paul Reuter, the man who built the famous news service that bears his name. The film was directed by William Dieterle and stars Edward G. Robinson.

== Plot ==
Paul Reuter starts a messenger service using homing pigeons to fill a gap in the telegraph network spanning Europe, but he faces difficulty attracting subscribers. When poison is mistakenly sent to a hospital, Reuter's message saves many lives. However, he is persuaded by Ida Magnus, the pretty daughter of Dr. Magnus, to suppress the news, as a scandal would jeopardize the good work that the doctors are performing.

With some hot news about Russia's invasion of Hungary, which would depress the stock market, Reuter convinces bankers that he can provide them with financial information much more quickly than by any other means. His disorganized friend Max Wagner runs Reuter's Brussels office, but Reuter learns that Ida had visited there and taken control of the office. Reuter sends a message by pigeon asking her to marry him, and she returns a pigeon with her assent.

When the telegraph network finally fills the gap that Reuter's business had been exploiting, he realizes that he can use his network of European employees to gather news and sell it to newspapers. He encounters resistance, particularly from John Delane, the influential editor of The Times, but persuades Louis Napoleon III to allow him to disseminate the text of an important speech while it is presented.

A rival company secretly builds a telegraph line in Ireland that provides it with a two-hour lead in receiving news from ships sailing from North America. Reuter borrows money from his client and friend Sir Randolph Persham and builds his own line that extends further west and retrieves the news even quicker. Its first use is to announce the assassination of President Lincoln. As nobody knows about Reuter's new telegraph line, he is accused of concocting the story to manipulate the stock market, and even Sir Randolph believes the rumors at first. The matter is discussed in the British Parliament, but Reuter is vindicated when slower services confirm his story.

== Cast ==
- Edward G. Robinson as Paul Julius Reuter
- Edna Best as Ida Magnus Reuter
- Eddie Albert as Max Wagner
- Albert Bassermann as Franz Geller
- Gene Lockhart as Otto Bauer
- Otto Kruger as Dr. Magnus
- Nigel Bruce as Sir Randolph Persham
- Montagu Love as John Delane
- James Stephenson as Carew
- Walter Kingsford as Louis Napoleon III
- David Bruce as Mr. Bruce
- Ernie Stanton as Cockney News Vendor (uncredited)
- Dickie Moore as Reuter as a Boy
- Lumsden Hare as Chairman
- Cyril Delevanti as Cockney News Vendor (uncredited)
- Gilbert Emery as Lord Palmerston (uncredited)
- Robert Homans as Reporter (uncredited)

== Production ==
The project's working titles were The Man from Fleet Street and The Man Reuter, but the title was changed to A Dispatch from Reuters in July 1940 at the suggestion of the film's director William Dieterle, who felt that titles for biographical films typically lacked intrigue.

In preparation for filming a scene in which a hawk pursues a carrier pigeon, bird handlers were concerned with the hawk overtaking and killing the pigeon, so they used both a tame hawk and a wild one and slowed the wild hawk's speed using weights attached to its body. However, it was the pigeon who chased both hawks, so the chase scene was shortened. After one of the carrier pigeons flew astray with a prop warning message about poisoned medicine affixed to its body, police departments north of Hollywood were warned to ignore the alarming message.

== Release ==
A preview screening was held at the Warner Hollywood Theater on September 18, 1940.

== Reception ==
In a contemporary review for The New York Times, critic Thomas M. Pryor called A Dispatch from Reuters "a slow-paced drama of mixed values" and wrote: "Though generally interesting, the new film ... is only occasionally stimulating, and there are instances when the biography of the journalist is more apocryphal than factual. But on the whole it is a creditable job, and, like William Dieterle's previous excursions into the biographical, the production is handsomely mounted and the story flows smoothly. ... Edward G. Robinson gives a sincere though not always convincing performance in the leading role."

Reviewer Philip K. Scheuer of the Los Angeles Times wrote: "[I]t is as excitingly factual as a bulletin from Europe and as inspiringly romantic as progress itself. Further in its favor is a stepping-up of the tempo above that of earlier scientific studies, as befits a saga of those swift heralds who bear the tidings of good or evil impartially to the corners of the earth. ... The production may carve no news [sic] paths in biological narrative, but it is one of the most representative of its type and a superlative movie."

Columnist Hedda Hopper remarked: "It's full of action. Eddie Robinson's performance has moments of great power."
