= Thomas Mildmay (died 1566) =

English politician

Thomas Mildmay (1515 – 21 September 1566), was an English politician, sheriff, and judicial officer.

He was born in Moulsham, Essex and London, the eldest son of Thomas Mildmay of Chelmsford, Essex.

From 1541 until his death, he was Justice of the peace for Essex. From 1558–1559, he was appointed High Sheriff of Essex and Hertfordshire. He was elected a Member of Parliament for Bodmin in October 1553, Lostwithiel in 1559 and Helston in 1547, Mar. 1553, 1555 and 1558.

He married Avice (modern form: Avis), the daughter of William Gonson of London, and had 8 sons and 7 daughters. Mildmay, who died in 1566, was a benefactor to King Edward VI Grammar School, Chelmsford.
