= Robert Campbell (MP for Helston) =

Robert Campbell MP

Member of Parliament for Helston
- In office 1 May 1866 – 5 July 1866
- Preceded by: Adolphus William Young
- Succeeded by: William Brett

Personal details
- Born: 12 July 1811 Sydney, New South Wales, Australia
- Died: 15 October 1887 (aged 76) Berkshire, England
- Party: Liberal
- Spouse: Anne Orr
- Children: 8, including: Robert Campbell; Florence Bravo

Robert Campbell (12 July 1811 – 1887) was a British Liberal Party politician, originally from Australia.

He was born in Sydney, Australia, on 12 July 1811, the son of Scottish-born merchant. entrepreneur and pastoralist Robert Campbell (1789–1851). He married Anne Orr in Parramatta, New South Wales on 15 January 1835. They later moved to England.

In 1859 he bought Buscot Park where he lived until his death in 1887.

He was elected MP for Helston at a by-election in May 1866 but was unseated in July 1866. The by-election had originally recorded 153 votes for both him and his rival, William Brett, but Campbell was declared elected after the Returning officer (who was the father of his election agent) cast a vote for him, after consulting a legal textbook which suggested he could make the casting vote.

A petition was lodged, and a committee decided the returning officer had no right to cast the vote and should have declared both candidates elected. However, on scrutiny one vote was taken from Campbell's total, leaving Brett elected alone. This election led to Parliament deciding that "according to the law and usage of Parliament, it is the duty of the sheriff or other returning officer in England, in the case of an equal number of votes being polled for two or more candidates at an election, to return all such candidates".

In 1877, Campbell's daughter Edith married Herbert Reuter, of Reuters. Within a few days of her death in 1915, Reuter killed himself.

His daughter Florence married Charles Bravo and was suspected of his murder, dying in 1878 of alcohol poisoning.

Campbell's son Robert Campbell (1843–1889) went into politics in New Zealand.

Parliament of the United Kingdom
Preceded by Adolphus William Young	Member of Parliament for Helston; May 1866 – July 1866	Succeeded by William Brett
