= Nicholas Aysshton =

Member of the Parliament of England

Nicholas Aysshton was an English politician who was MP for Liskeard in May 1421, Helston in 1422, 1423, 1425, 1427, and 1435, Launceston in 1431 and 1432, and Cornwall in 1437 and 1439. He was a justice of the peace in Cornwall, Devon, Dorset, Hampshire, Somerset, Surrey, and Wiltshire; a steward and receiver of Caliland; and a serjeant-at-law. His son was Edward Aysshton.
