= Joseph Abraham Stargardt =

German bookseller

- Born: 17 June 1822; Märkisch Friedland, West Prussia, Kingdom of Prussia (Mirosławiec, Poland)
- Died: 30 April 1885 (aged 62); Berlin, German Empire
- Occupation: bookseller

Joseph Abraham Stargardt (17 June 1822 – 30 April 1885) was a German bookseller and business partner of Paul Julius Reuter.

Stargardt was born in Märkisch Friedland, West Prussia, Kingdom of Prussia (Mirosławiec, Poland). He started to work as a bookseller at Asher & Co. in Berlin in 1838. From April to September 1844 he worked at "Amelangschen Buchhandlung" in Berlin and from October to December 1845 at A. Franck in Paris. In 1846 Stargardt worked in Halle (Saale) at "J. T. Lippert" and in 1847 he and his affiliate Paul Julius Reuter (1816–99) purchased Johann Carl Klage's book and music store in Berlin.

Stargardt applied for Berlin citizenship in August 1847 but on 8 December 1847 he refused to swear the special form of oath provided for Jews. He received the official citizenship finally on 28 May 1852.

In the German revolutions of 1848-49 the Reuter & Stargardt publishing house publicized several "radical-democratic" pamphlets and booklets and Stargardt came in contact with philosophers like Max Stirner (1806–56). In 1849 P. J. Reuter was accused of distributing democratic literature and fled to London, where he founded his Telegraphic Office in 1851. Stargardt became the sole proprietor of Reuter & Stargardt, now operating as "J. A. Stargardt".

In the early 1850s the store was regularly searched by the Prussian police and several publications and posters were confiscated. Stargardt then specialized on antiquarian and autographic bookselling. Alexander von Humboldt, Bettina von Arnim, Karl August Varnhagen von Ense and Crownprince Friedrich Wilhelm became regular customers.

Stargardt died on 30 April 1885 in Berlin. The "J.A. Stargardt" autograph store still exists today.
