= William Molesworth-St Aubyn =

English politician

Member of Parliament for Helston
- In office 1880–1885

Personal details
- Born: William Napleton Molesworth-St Aubyn; 18 October 1835
- Died: 29 June 1895 (aged 59)
- Spouse: Annie Coles
- Parents: Hender Molesworth-St Aubyn (father); Helen Matilda Isabelle Napleton (mother)
- Education: Harrow School; Christ Church, Oxford

William Napleton Molesworth-St Aubyn (18 October 1838 – 29 June 1895) was an English Conservative politician who sat in the House of Commons from 1880 to 1885.

Molesworth-St Aubyn was the son of Rev. Hender Molesworth-St Aubyn of Clowance, Cornwall and his wife Helen Matilda Isabelle Napleton, daughter of Rev. T Napleton of Powderham, Devon. He was educated at Harrow School and Christ Church, Oxford. He was called to the bar at Lincoln's Inn and went on the western circuit and the Devon and Exeter sessions.

At the 1880 general election Molesworth-St Aubyn was elected member of parliament for Helston. He held the seat until the borough was disenfranchised in 1885. At the 1885 general election, he contested the Truro seat, where he was defeated by the Liberal Party candidate William Bickford-Smith.

Molesworth St Aubyn married Annie Coles, daughter of George Coles of Southsea.

Parliament of the United Kingdom
Preceded by Adolphus William Young	Member of Parliament for Helston; 1880 – 1885	constituency abolished
