= Alexander Penhellick =

Member of the Parliament of England

Alexander Penhellick (c1632 - c 1661) was an English politician who sat in the House of Commons in 1660.

Penhellick was the eldest son of Humphrey Penhellick of Helston and his wife Grace Bolithoe. His father was mayor of Helston in 1638. Penhellick was a merchant and in 1652 he was granted a commission for a privateer with Peter Ceely. He was commissioner for assessment for Cornwall in 1652 and 1657.

In April 1660 Penhellick was elected Member of Parliament for Helston in the Convention Parliament. There was a double return at the election and Penhellick was seated on the merits of the return. However, in June the election was declared void and he left the House of Commons without having made any speeches and having been appointed to no committees.

Penhellick died between 12 October 1660 when he signed his will and 12 February 1662 when the will was proved.

Penhellick married Dorcas and had a son and daughter.
