= John Kyme (MP for Helston) =

English politician

John Kyme or Cayme (by 1519 – 25 April 1585), of London and Lewes, Sussex, was an English politician.

He was a member (MP) of the parliament of England for Helston in April 1554.
