= Charles Trueman =

British politician (1814–1879)

Member of Parliament for Helston
- In office 27 March 1857 – 30 April 1859
- Preceded by: Richard Vyvyan
- Succeeded by: John Jope Rogers

Personal details
- Born: 1814
- Died: 1879 (aged 64–65)
- Party: Liberal
- Other political affiliations: Whig

Charles Trueman (1814–1879) was a British Liberal and Whig politician.

Trueman was elected Whig MP for Helston unopposed at the 1857 general election, but lost the seat at the next election in 1859 when he stood as a Liberal.

Parliament of the United Kingdom
Preceded by Richard Vyvyan	Member of Parliament for Helston; 1857–1859	Succeeded by John Jope Rogers
