= Herbert de Reuter =

English business executive of Reuters

August Julius Clemens Herbert Reuter, 2nd Baron de Reuter (10 March 1852 – 18 April 1915) was a British businessman in London who spent most of his adult life working for his father's news agency, Reuters, of which he was general manager for 37 years, from 1878 until his death.

He killed himself on 18 April 1915, three days after his wife's death, and with Reuters in financial difficulties.

== Life ==
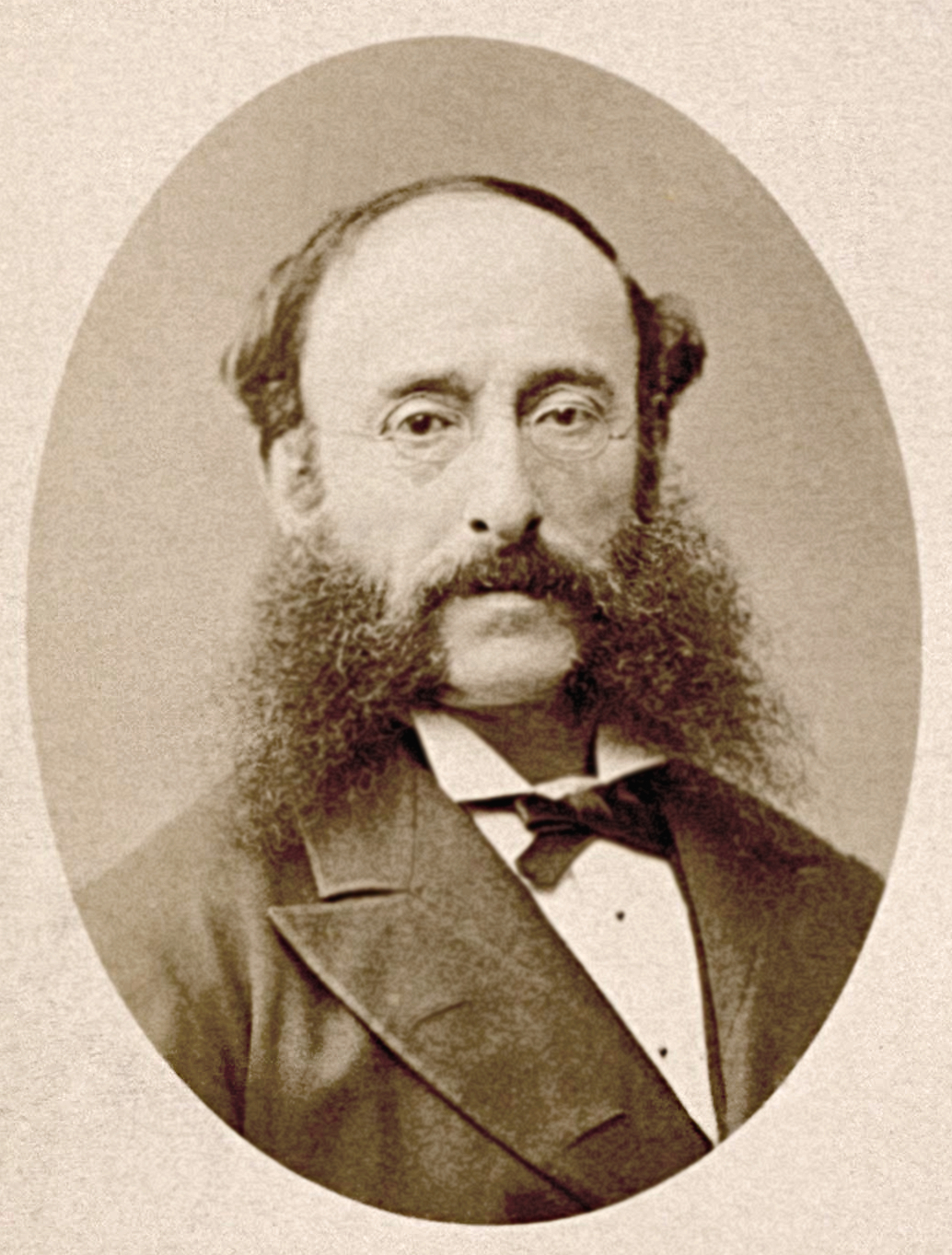
Reuter's father, Paul Reuter

Reuter was born in London in 1852, the eldest son of Paul Reuter, by his marriage to Ida Maria, a daughter of Friedrich Martin Magnus, a banker in Berlin. Both his parents were German-speaking Jews, but on 16 November 1845, seven days before the marriage, his father changed his name from Josaphat to Reuter and converted from Judaism to Lutheranism, taking the Christian names Paul Julius in a baptism ceremony at St George's German Lutheran Church, Whitechapel. His marriage to Ida Maria Magnus also took place there, on 23 November.

The young Herbert Reuter was educated at Harrow and Balliol College, Oxford. Unlike his father, he was thoroughly English.

Reuter had two younger brothers, George and Alfred, and a sister, Clementine Maria. She married, in 1875, the Swedish Count Otto Stenbock, Councillor of the Swedish Legation in London, subsequently the Swedish Minister in Lisbon and then in Constantinople.

Reuter spent most of his life in the service of the Reuters news agency, which his father had established. After his father's retirement in 1878, he became the agency's general manager, at the age of 26. The name of Reuters was well known, and Paul Reuter had been a prominent public figure, but although Herbert was managing director for longer, he never became well known.

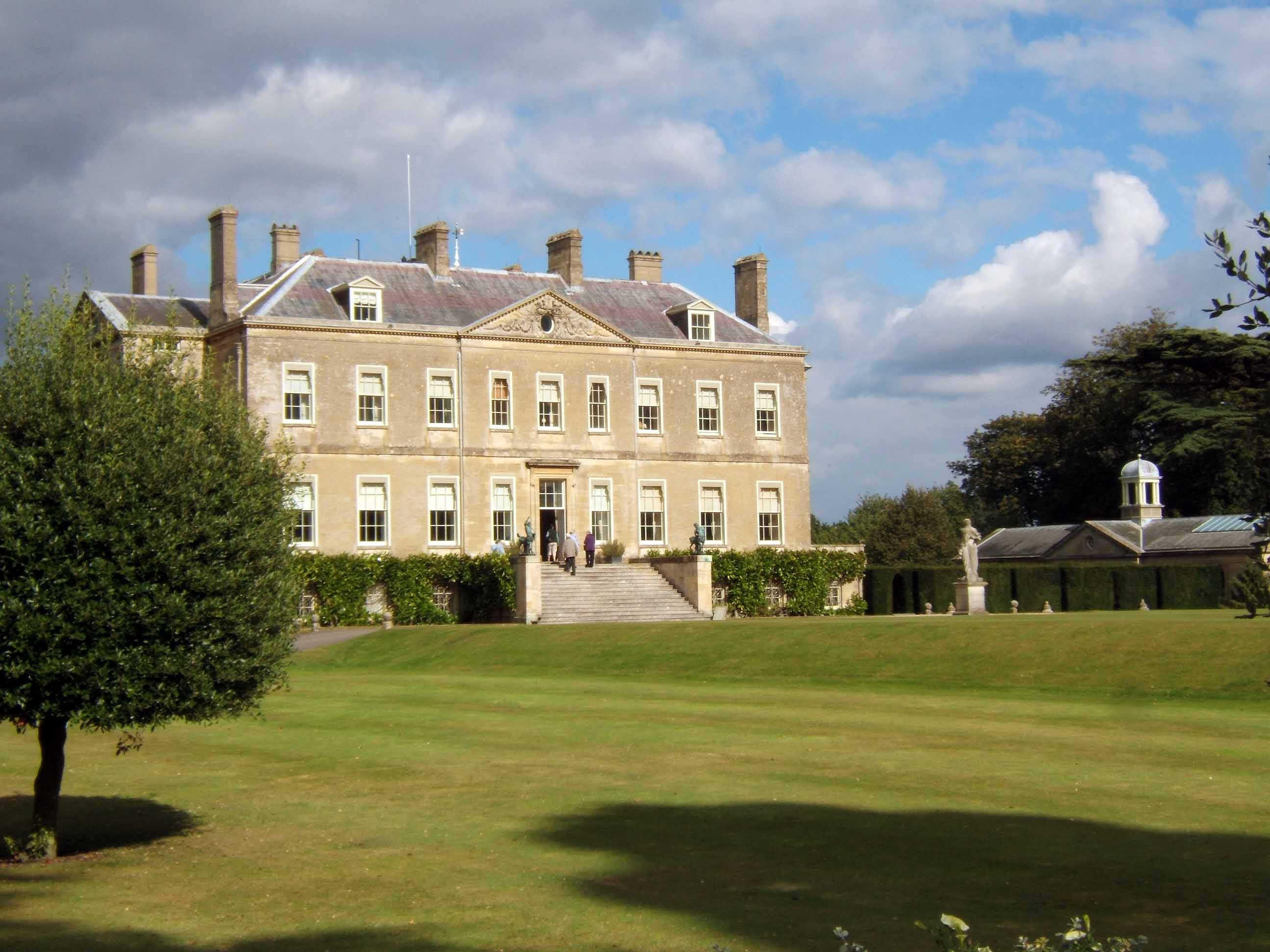
Buscot Park

Marrying Edith Campbell, a daughter of Robert Campbell, of Buscot Park, Berkshire, in 1876, Reuter had a daughter, Olga Edith, born on 14 January 1877, and a son, Hubert Julius de Reuter, born on 6 September 1878, who joined the family firm. In 1901, his daughter married John William Edward James Douglas of Tilquihillie, by Banchory, and they had a son, John Sholto, born in 1904, and two daughters, Madeleine Clemence Ogilvie and Phoebe Mary.

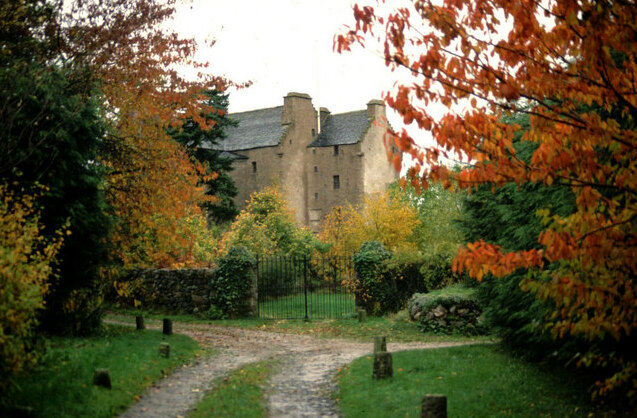
Tilquhillie

For some years, Reuters had operated a banking department, which was profitable, and in 1913 Reuter launched Reuters Bank as a subsidiary of the News Agency. However, it proved an expensive mistake and within two years had swallowed up the whole of the reserves of the main company.

On 18 April 1915, at Reigate, Reuter shot himself dead with a revolver, a few days after the death of his wife. Two days later, on 20 April, their son Hubert enlisted as a private in the Royal Fusiliers. He was killed in action on 13 November 1916.

In October 1915, Roderick Jones was appointed as general manager of Reuters, and in 1916 he and the company chairman, Mark Napier, bought the company.

In 1920, after her first husband's death, Reuter's sister Clementine married Sir Herbert Chermside, a former Governor of Queensland. She lived until 1941, when she left an estate valued at £49,664, equal to £3,106,638 today.
