= Robert Docat =

16th-century English politician

Robert Docat (fl. 1553) was an English politician.

He was a member (MP) of the parliament of England for Helston in March 1553.
