= Henry Trengove =

Member of the Parliament of England

Henry Trengove or Nance (by 1521 – November 1561), of Nance in Illogan, Cornwall, was a Cornish politician.

He was a member (MP) of the parliament of England for Helston, Cornwall in October 1553.
