= John Trengove (politician) =

16th-century English politician

John Trengove (fl. 1547) was an English politician.

He was a member (MP) of the parliament of England for Helston in 1547.
