= Stephen Beville =

English composer and pianist

Stephen Beville is an English composer and pianist of classical music.

Acclaimed in 2010 as 'one of the most talented young musicians to emerge from the UK' (Frankfurter Neue Press), Beville began to compose and study the piano at the age of eleven. As a pianist, he has performed throughout Britain and Germany, and has made recordings and given interviews for SWR (Southwest German) radio. Beville has performed at festivals including the Huddersfield Contemporary Music Festival, the 'Glories of the Keyboard', and 'American Reflections' festivals at the Royal Northern College of Music and the London New Wind Festival.

== Career ==
Beville studied at the Junior Academy (Royal Academy of Music) from 1989 to 1994, learning composition, and later piano and conducting. Having won a Yamaha scholarship, he read music at the University of Huddersfield. During this time, he performed much contemporary music, and studied piano with Peter Katin and composition with Richard Steinitz.

Beville graduated in 1998 with First Class Honours, and was awarded the Wilfrid Mellers prize and Rodwell prize.

He thereafter continued his studies at the Royal Northern College of Music in Manchester. Beville is the recipient of the PG Diploma and MMus in Performance and Composition, and the Professional Performance Diploma with Distinction - the most prestigious accolade of the RNCM. In 2001, he won the 'Lucy Pierce Award'. He has performed with the RNCM Symphony Orchestra, Chamber Orchestra and The New Ensemble in a range of contemporary music, not least his own work.

Beville's music has been performed in venues such as the Royal Academy of Music, the British Music Information Centre, The Barbican and King's College in London, the RNCM, Exeter Cathedral, the Velte-Saal, Insel Theatre and ZKM (Centre for Art and Media Technology) in Karlsruhe, and the BKA Theatre in Berlin. The early Chamber Concerto was premiered by the Manson Ensemble, and later selected by the Society for the Promotion of New Music for a performance by Music-Projects London, conducted by Martyn Brabbins. Other works that have been selected by the SPNM include the Ballade for Eight Players, Purgatory Pieces for string quartet, and Epicycle for chamber orchestra - first performed by The New Ensemble, directed by Andre de Ridder.

In 2001, Beville won a DAAD scholarship to study at the Musikhochschule Karlsruhe in Germany, where he obtained the Konzertexamen both in Composition and Performance - First Class. In addition, he was awarded a scholarship from the Heinrich Strobel Stiftung, Freiburg to support his studies. In Karlsruhe, he focused mainly on combining live instrumental performance with electronic facilities available at the ComputerStudio of HfM Karlsruhe. This resulted in works with piano, such as The Echoing Sky, Three Michelangelo Pieces, and Fashionism - Scenes of Youth for electric guitar, piano, percussion and live electronics. All have been performed to critical acclaim - the first piece in collaboration with the Badische Konservatorium to mark 400 years of keyboard music. Recent works include Jerusalem Visions (2016) for chorus and orchestra (composed to commemorate the 100th anniversary of Hubert Parry's anthem Jerusalem), Kyrie (2020) and Every Man (2021) also for chorus and orchestra. Beville's music has been featured at international festivals of contemporary music such as KlangRiffe 2003, the London New Wind Festival (2007/2008) and the 'Unerhoerte Musik' days in Berlin (2011).

In 2011, a first volume of Beville's music (comprising Purgatory Pieces and Scenes from Dreams) was published by the Berlin-based publishers Simon-Verlag. His debut CD recordings of piano music by Beethoven, Chopin, Schumann and Boulez was released to critical acclaim the following year on the Divine Art label.

== Discography ==
- Stephen Beville in Karlsruhe (Divine Art, CD25108)
  - CD 1: Frédéric Chopin – Scherzo No. 4 in E major, Op. 54; Pierre Boulez – Douze Notations; Ludwig van Beethoven – Piano Sonata No. 32 in C minor, Op. 111
  - CD 2: Ludwig van Beethoven – Piano Sonata No. 26 in E-flat major, Op. 81a (Les Adieux); Robert Schumann – Fantasie in C major, Op. 17
- Stephen Beville – Visions and Ventures (Divine Art, CD25230)
  - Johann Sebastian Bach – Prelude and Fugue in E major from The Well-Tempered Clavier, Book II; Sergei Prokofiev – Visions fugitives, Op. 22; Ludwig van Beethoven – Piano Sonata No. 4 in E-flat major, Op. 7

== Selected works ==
- Ballade for Eight Players (1997)
- Prologue for string Quartet (1998)
- Three Piano Pieces (1998)
- Epicycle for chamber orchestra (1999–2000)
- Meditations at the Cross for large ensemble (2000)
- The Echoing Sky for piano and electronics (2001)
- Three Michelangelo Pieces for piano, electronics and tape (2002)
- Fashionism - Scenes of Youth for electric guitar, piano, percussion and electronics (2003)
- Purgatory Pieces for string quartet (2004)
- Nocturnes for violin and piano (2005)
- Scenes from Dreams - Six pieces for piano (2006)
- Grand Partita for speaker and large orchestra (2007–8)
- Improvisation I - The Time of Day for cello and piano (2009)
- Shards and Shimmers for piano solo (2009–10)
- Aria for flute and piano (2010)
- Four Sacred Pieces for various instruments (2011)
- Monodrama for solo violin (2011)
- Prelude, Etude & Fantasy, for keyboard (2012)
- Other Spaces for viola and bongos (2012)
- Hootenanny for flute and electronics (2013)
- Homage to Mondrian for piano (2014)
- Jerusalem Visions for chorus and orchestra (text: William Blake) (2016)
- Triptych for Church Organ (2017)
- Two Painters (Mondrian and Nicholson) for piano (2018)
- Out Wonted Hymn for chorus and organ (text: R. Bridges) (2019)
- L'education philosophique for clarinet, metallic percussion and speaker (2019)
- Portrait of the Angel Raphael for piano (2020)
- Kyrie for solo singers, chorus and orchestra (2020)
- Holy Song for chorus and organ (2021)
- Every Man chorus and orchestra (text: W Kandinsky) (2021)
- Fanfare for the Solitary Man for solo cornet (2021)
- The Word for chorus and organ (2022)
- Jesus Lamb of God for unaccompanied choir (2022)
- Memento for unaccompanied choir (2023)
