= Thomas Beville (MP for Helston) =

English politician

Thomas Beville (fl. 1397–1439) was an English politician. He sat as MP for Helston in January 1397.

Before 1435, he had contracted debts in London and Middlesex amounting to £58.
