= William Trewynnard =

English politician

William Trewynnard (by 1495 – 1549), of Trewinnard, Cornwall, was a Cornish politician.

He was a member (MP) of the parliament of England for Helston in 1542.

He was robbed and his estates despoiled during the Prayer Book Rebellion in 1549, when he was mortally wounded by rebels when trying to shelter at St Michael's Mount.
