= Paul Reuter =

Anglo-German entrepreneur and news agency founder (1816–1899)

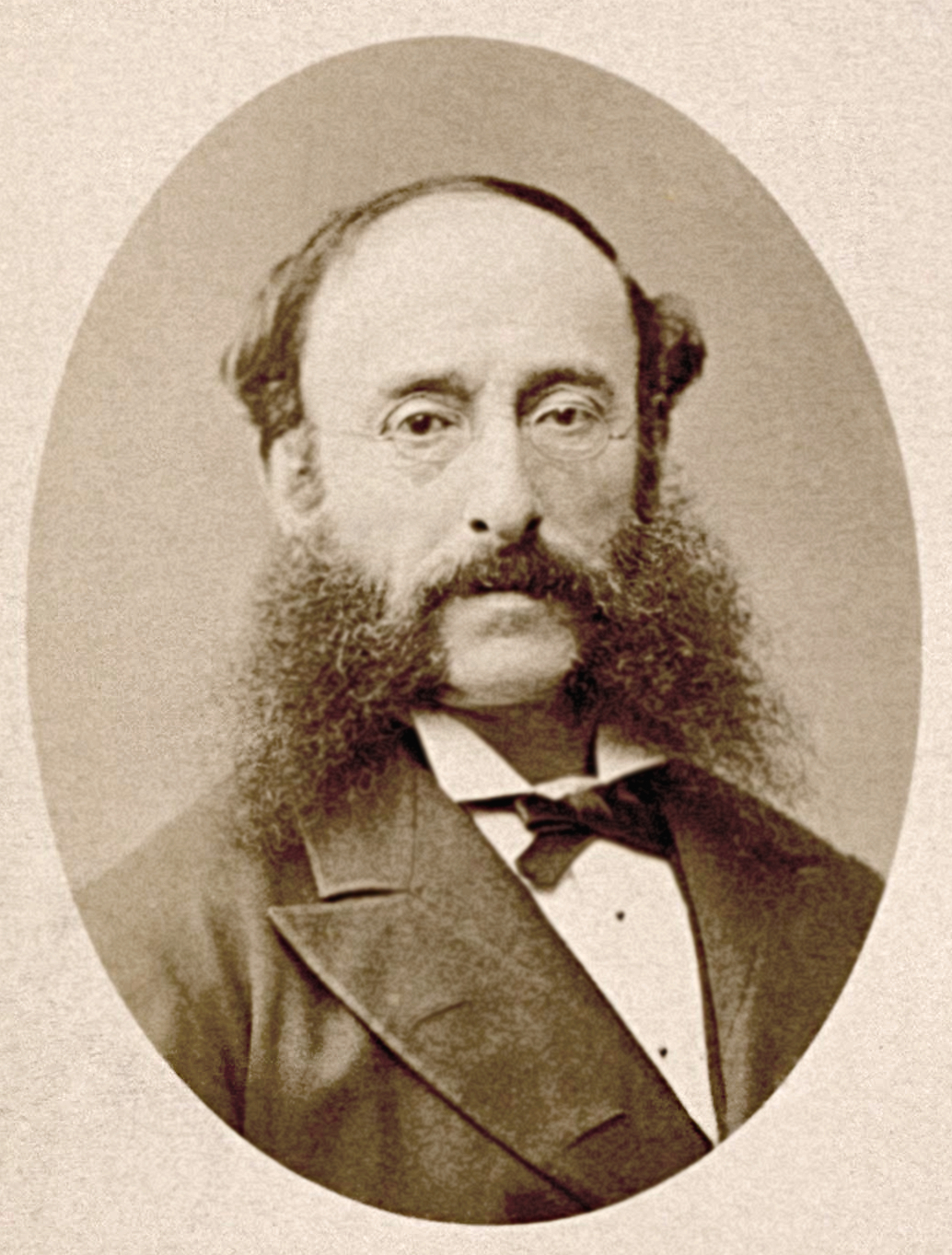
- Reuter c. 1860
- Born: Israel Beer Josaphat; 21 July 1816; Kassel, Electorate of Hesse, German Confederation
- Died: 25 February 1899 (aged 82); Nice, France
- Occupations: Entrepreneur and reporter
- Known for: Reuters news agency
- Spouse: Ida Maria Magnus (m. 1845)
- Children: 3, including Herbert

Paul Julius Reuter (born Israel Beer Josaphat; 21 July 1816 – 25 February 1899), later ennobled as Freiherr von Reuter (Baron von Reuter), was a German-born British entrepreneur who was a pioneer of telegraphy and news reporting. He was a reporter, media owner, and the founder of the Reuters news agency, which became part of the Thomson Reuters conglomerate in 2008.

== Life and career ==
Reuter was born in a Jewish family as Israel Beer Josaphat in Kassel, Electorate of Hesse (now part of the Federal Republic of Germany). His father, Samuel Levi Josaphat, was a rabbi. His mother was Betty Sanders. In Göttingen, Reuter met Carl Friedrich Gauss, who was experimenting with the transmission of electrical signals via wire.

On 16 November 1845, he converted to Christianity in a ceremony at St. George's German Lutheran Chapel in London, and changed his name to Paul Julius Reuter. One week later, in the same chapel, he married Ida Maria Elizabeth Clementine Magnus of Berlin, daughter of a German banker.

After some work as a bank clerk, in 1847 he founded Reuter and Stargardt, a Berlin book-publishing firm, with Joseph Abraham Stargardt. The distribution of radical pamphlets by the firm at the beginning of the 1848 Revolution may have focused official scrutiny on Reuter. Later that year, he left for Paris and worked in Charles-Louis Havas' news agency, Agence Havas, the future Agence France Presse.

As electrical telegraphy evolved, Reuter founded his own news agency in Aachen. Until the entire distance was connected by telegraph, messages were transferred on the leg between Brussels and Aachen using homing pigeons, completing the link to Berlin and Paris. Speedier than the post train, pigeons gave Reuter faster access to financial news from the Paris stock exchange. Eventually the telegraph link was completed and the pigeons were no longer necessary.

A telegraph line was being laid between Britain and continental Europe, so Reuter moved to London, renting an office near the Stock Exchange. In 1863, he privately erected a telegraph link to Crookhaven, the farthest south-western point of Ireland. On nearing Crookhaven, ships from the U.S. threw canisters containing news into the sea. These were retrieved by Reuters and telegraphed directly to London, arriving long before the ships reached Cork.

On 17 March 1857, Reuter was naturalised as a British subject. On 7 September 1871, the Duke of Saxe-Coburg and Gotha granted him the noble title of Freiherr (baron). In November 1891, Queen Victoria granted him and his male-line successors the right to use that German title (listed as Baron von Reuter) in Britain.

In 1872, Nasir al-Din Shah, the Shah of Iran, signed a surprisingly lopsided concession agreement with Reuter. George Curzon wrote that:

[t]he concession was dated 25 July 1872. When published to the world, it was found to contain the most complete and extraordinary surrender of the entire industrial resources of a kingdom into foreign hands that has probably ever been dreamed of, much less accomplished, in history. Exclusive of the clauses referring to railroads and tramways, which conferred an absolute monopoly of both those undertakings upon Baron de Reuter for the space of seventy years, the concession also handed over to him the exclusive working for the same period of all Persian mines, except those of gold, silver, and precious stones; the monopoly of the government forests, all uncultivated land being embraced under that designation; the exclusive construction of canals, kanats, and irrigation works of every description; the first refusal of a national bank, and of all future enterprises connected with the introduction of roads, telegraphs, mills, factories, workshops, and public works of every description; and a farm of the entire customs of the empire for a period of twenty-five years from 1 March 1874, upon payment to the Shah of a stipulated sum for the first five years, and of an additional sixty per cent of the net revenue for the remaining twenty. With respect to the other profits, twenty per cent of those accruing from railways, and fifteen per cent of those derived from all other sources, were reserved for the Persian Government.

The Reuter concession was immediately denounced by all ranks of businessmen, clergy, and nationalists of Persia, and it was quickly forced into cancellation.

== Marriage and children ==
In 1845, Reuter married Ida Maria Magnus, daughter of Friedrich Martin Magnus, a German banker in Berlin. They had three sons: Herbert, who became the 2nd baron (succeeded by his son Hubert as 3rd baron), George and Alfred. Clementine Maria, one of his daughters, married Count Otto Stenbock, and after Stenbock's death, Sir Herbert Chermside, a governor of Queensland.

The 2nd baron's brother George had two sons, Oliver (who became the 4th baron) and Ronald. The last member of the family, Marguerite, Baroness de Reuter, widow of the 4th baron and Paul Julius Reuter's granddaughter-in-law, died on 25 January 2009, at the age of 96.

== Death and legacy ==
Reuter died in 1899 in Nice, France.

Reuter was portrayed by Edward G. Robinson in the Warner Bros. biographical film A Dispatch from Reuters (1941).

The Reuters News Agency commemorated the 100th anniversary of its founder's death by launching a university award (the Paul Julius Reuter Innovation Award) in Germany.

== Gallery ==
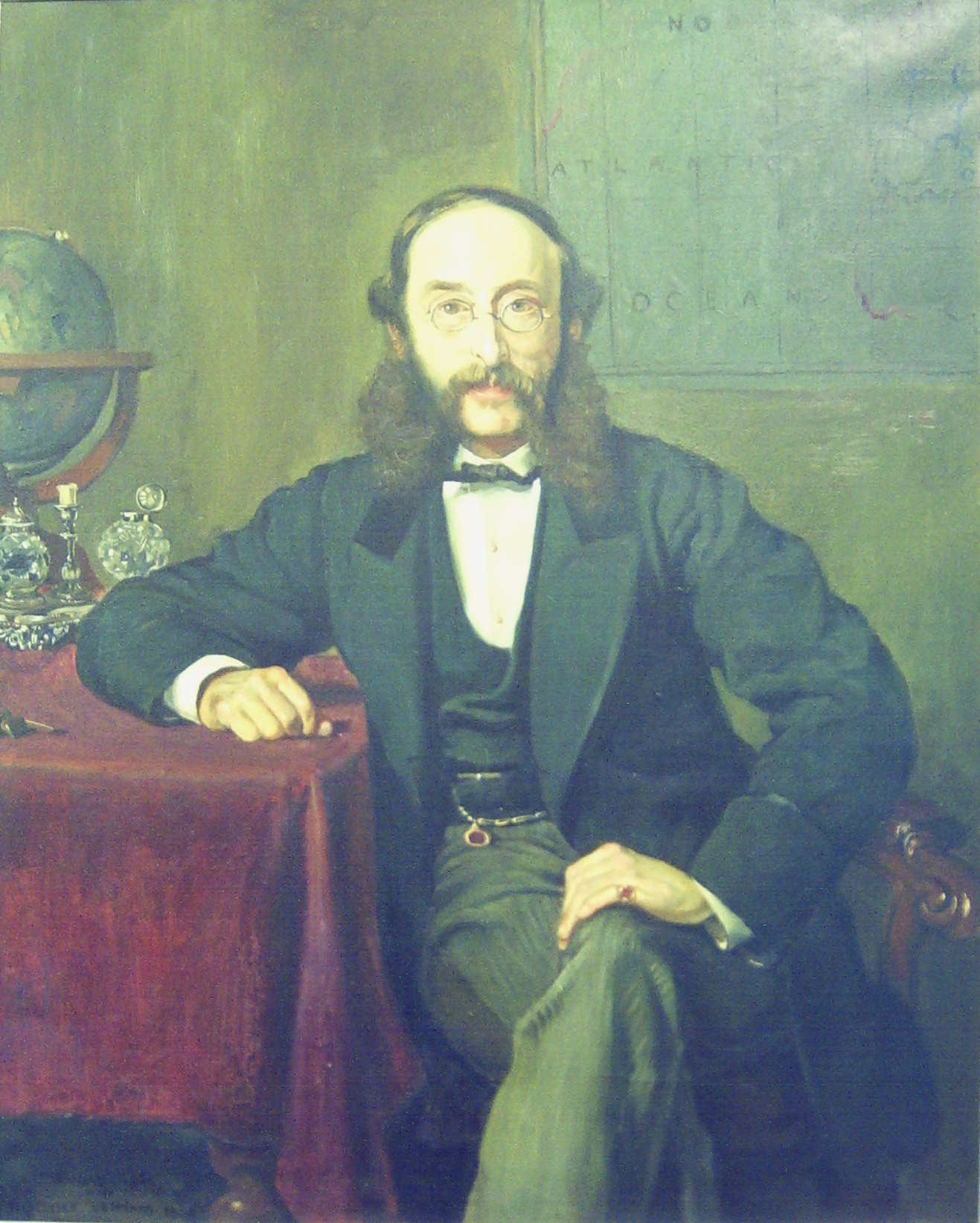
Portrait of Reuter in 1869 at age 53, by Rudolf Lehmann

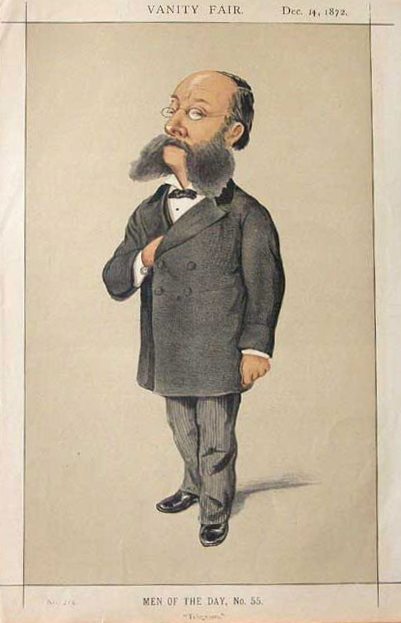
Caricature of Reuter in 1872

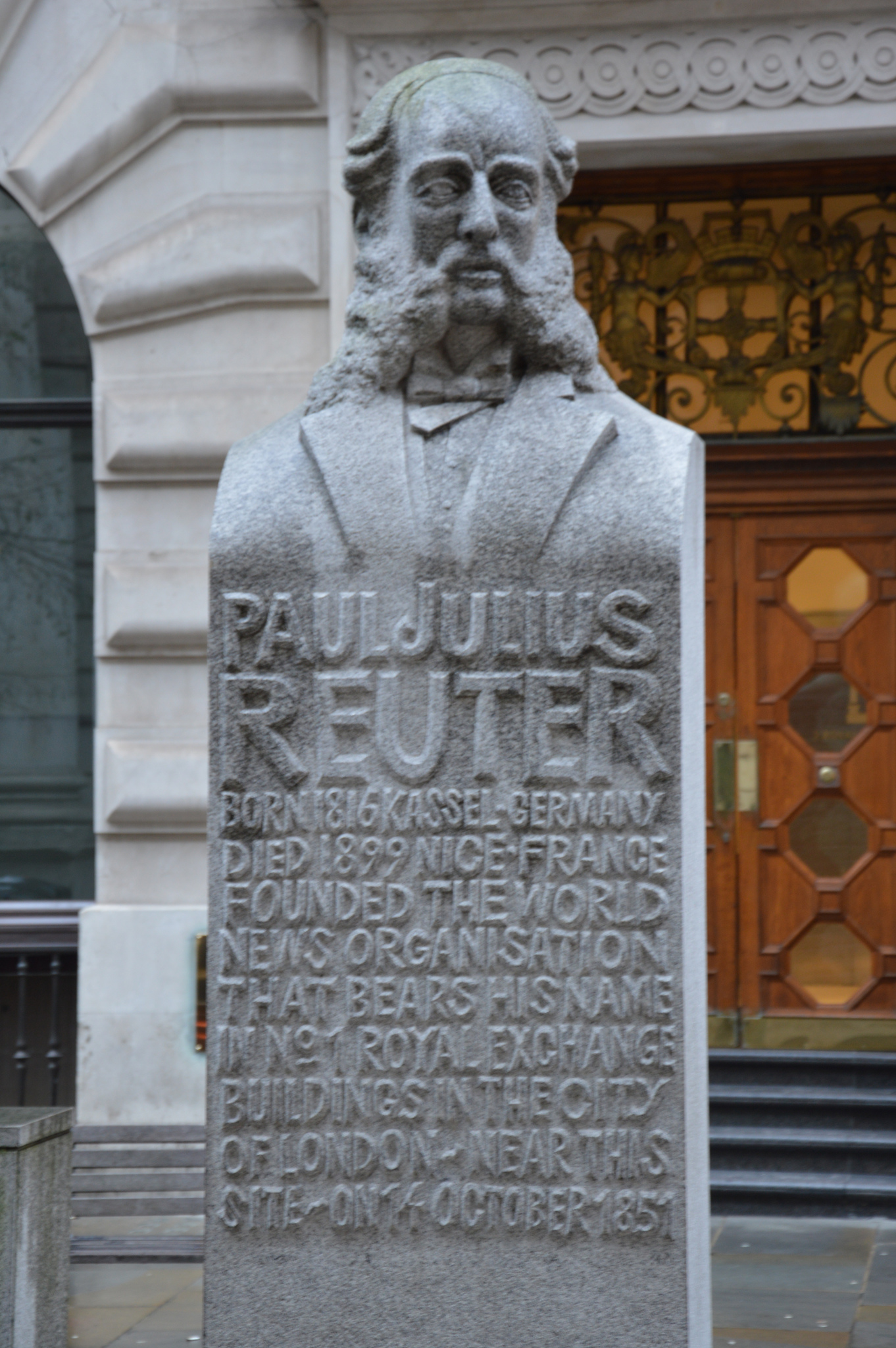
Bust of Reuter in the City of London

== See also ==
- German inventors and discoverers
