= Richard Heywood (MP) =

Member of the Parliament of England

Richard Heywood (by 1520 – 1570), of London, was a Member of Parliament for Helston in 1545.
