= Henry Pierce Bone =

English painter

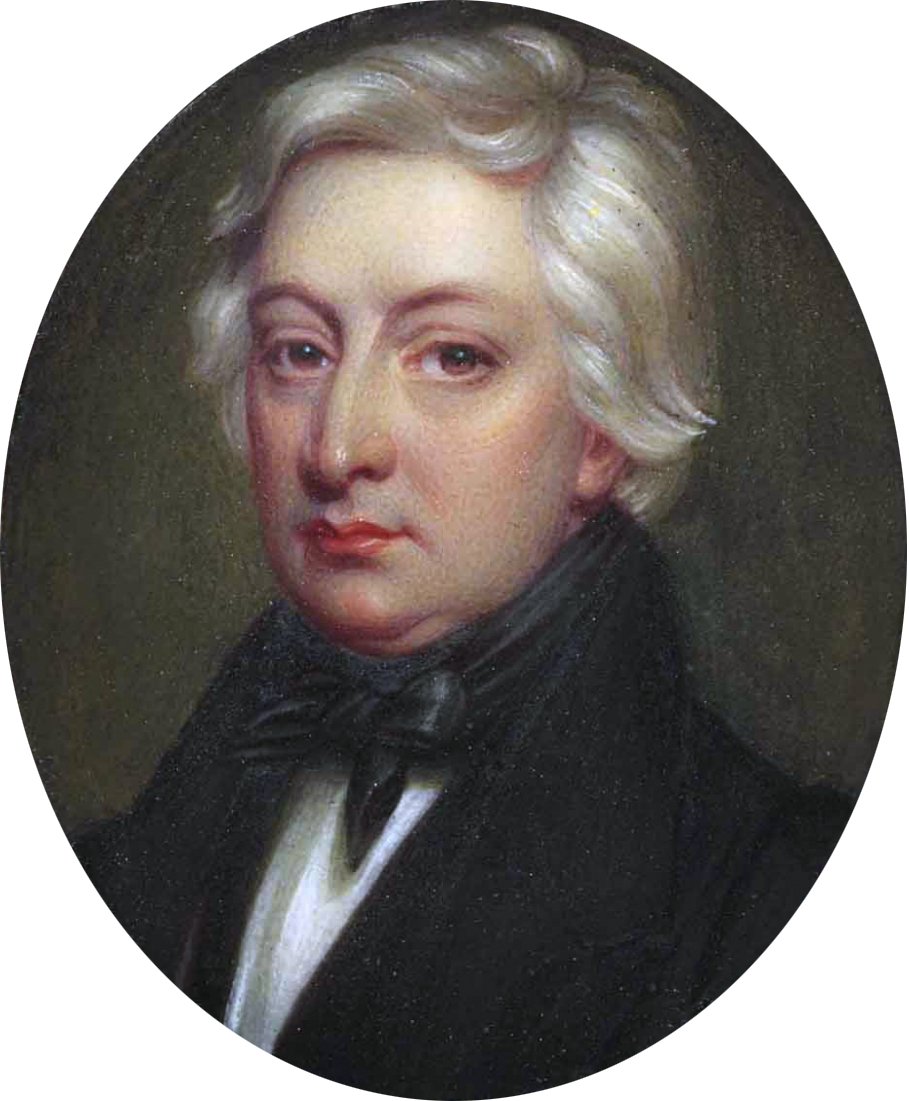
Self portrait (1867)

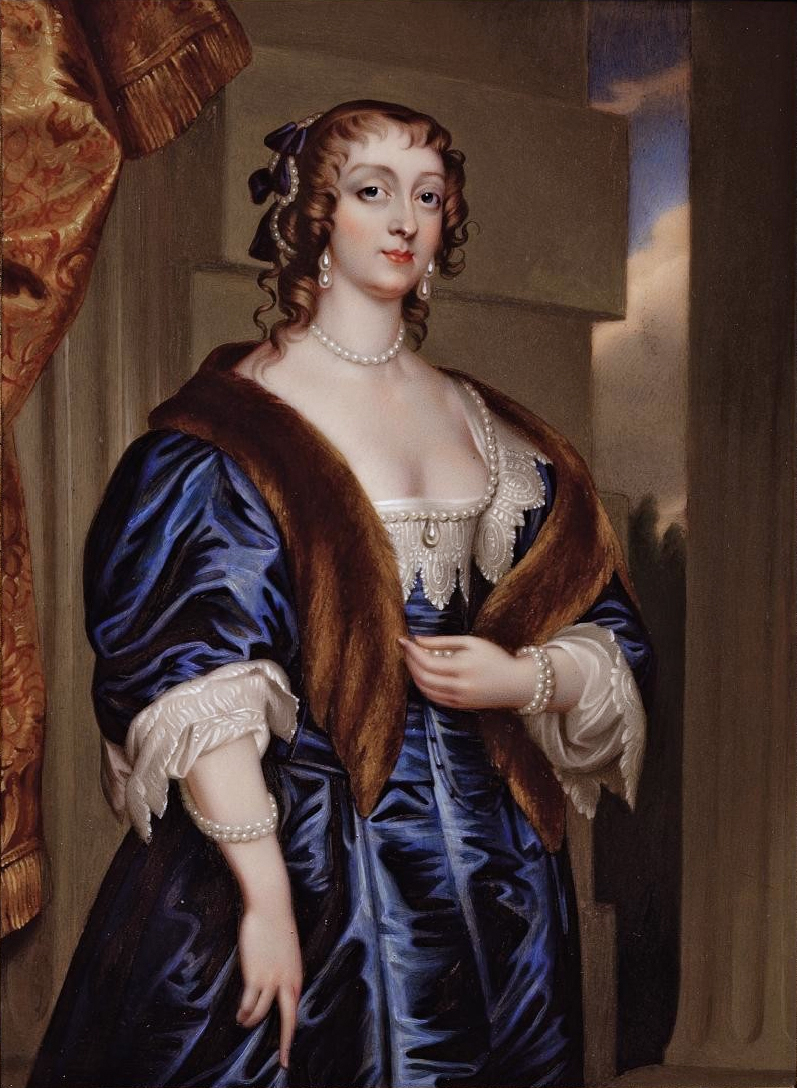
Lady Mary Feilding, Duchess of Hamilton – daughter of William Feilding, 1st Earl of Denbigh (1839, after Anthony van Dyck)

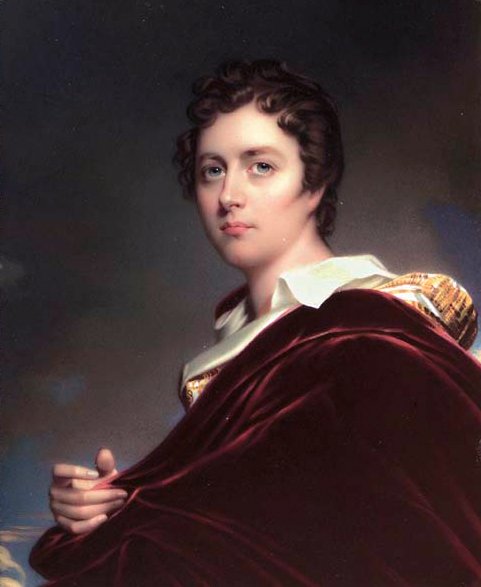
Lord Byron by Henry Pierce Bone

Henry Pierce Bone (6 November 1779 – 21 October 1855 London) was an English enamel painter.

== Life ==
Bone was the son of Henry Bone, the notable enamel painter, and Elizabeth Van der Meulen, a descendant of the distinguished battle-painter Adam Frans van der Meulen. His brother was the artist Robert Trewick Bone (1790–1840). He received his art education from his father.

He commenced as a painter in oils, and exhibited some portraits at the age of twenty. In 1806 he began painting classical subjects, and continued doing so until 1833, when he reverted to his father's art of enameling, which he continued to practise until the year of his death.

In 1846 he published a catalogue of his enamels. He was appointed successively enamel painter to Adelaide of Saxe-Meiningen and to Queen Victoria and Albert of Saxe-Coburg and Gotha. Though his enamels did not attain the quality of his father's, they display very considerable ability, and he was not only a rapid sketcher, but his designs for classical and scripture subjects were bold and skilful.

In 1851 Bone wrote to Prince Albert resigning his position as enameller to Albert and Queen Victoria. This appears to have arisen because the enamels of other painters were preferred for prizes at the Great Exhibition, leaving him feeling "no longer worthy" of holding the post. There is no documentary record in the Royal Archives of his resignation, or any reply to his letter, but Bone stopped adding his appointments to the inscriptions on paintings he did in subsequent years.

Bone died at 22 Percy Street, Bedford Square, London on 21 October 1855 and was buried on the western side of Highgate Cemetery.
