= Helston (constituency) =

Parliamentary constituency in the United Kingdom, 1832–1885

- Former borough constituency for the House of Commons
- County: Cornwall
- Major settlements: Helston

1298–1885
- Seats: 1298–1832: Two; 1832–1885: One
- Replaced by: Truro

Helston, sometimes known as Helleston, was a parliamentary borough centred on the small town of Helston in Cornwall.

Using the block vote system of election, it returned two Members of Parliament (MPs) to the House of Commons of England until 1707, then to the House of Commons of Great Britain until 1800, and to the House of Commons of the United Kingdom until the 1832 general election.

The Reform Act 1832 reduced its representation to one member, elected by the first-past-the-post system. Under the Redistribution of Seats Act 1885, it was abolished with effect from the 1885 general election.

== Members of Parliament ==
=== MPs before 1640 ===
- Constituency created (1298)

Parliament	First member	Second member
1298	R de Rosemayn	I de Kellyhellan
1318	J Jerveys	
1323–24	John Tremayne	
1325	David De Autrenon	
1332	J Jerveys	
1338	J Jerveys	
1341–42	John Tremayne	
1351–52	Johannes De Tremayn (Note: Also member for Bodmin)	
1358	John Hamely	
1360	T Jerveys	
1361	John Hamely	
1363	T Jerveys	
1384	William Bodrugan	
Parliament of 1386	Roger Trewythenick	John Urban
First Parliament of 1388 (Feb)	Thomas Tregadereth	Roger Trewythenick
Second Parliament of 1388 (Sep)	Thomas Bray	John Symon
First Parliament of 1390 (Jan)	Roger Trewythenick	John Urban
Second Parliament of 1390 (Nov)	?	?
Parliament of 1391	Roger Trewythenick	William Glasen
Parliament of 1393	John Trereise	Michael Trereise
Parliament of 1394	?	?
Parliament of 1395	Roger Trewythenick	Roger Skewys
First Parliament of 1397 (Jan)	Thomas Beville	John Urban
Second Parliament of 1397 (Sep)	John Pengersick	John Skewys
Parliament of 1399	Roger Trewythenick	John Pengersick
Parliament of 1401	?	?
Parliament of 1402	Roger Trewythenick	John Masselegh
First Parliament of 1404 (Jan)		
Second Parliament of 1404 (Oct)		
Parliament of 1406	Walter Badrygy	William Penalewy
Parliament of 1407	John Pengersick	Matthew Skewys
Parliament of 1410	M Jerveys	
Parliament of 1411	John Glasen	Thomas Pellour
First Parliament of 1413 (Feb)		
Second Parliament of 1413 (May)	Thomas Treffidowe	Thomas Polglas
First Parliament of 1414 (Apr)		
Second Parliament of 1414 (Nov)	John Clink	John Baker
Parliament of 1415 or 1416 (Mar)	John Glasen	Robert Treage
Parliament of 1416 (Oct)		
Parliament of 1417	John Glasen	Thomas Gurtaboys
Parliament of 1419	Robert Treage	John Cork
Parliament of 1420	William Richard	William Trethake II
First Parliament of 1421 (May)	Thomas Carathyn	John Treffridowe
Second Parliament of 1421 (Dec)	William Penpons	Adam Vivian\
1422	Nicholas Aysshton	
1423	Nicholas Aysshton	
1425	Nicholas Aysshton	
1427	Nicholas Aysshton	
1435	Nicholas Aysshton	
1491–92	William Antron	
Parliament of 1529	Edmund Smith	John Holdiche
Parliament of 1542	William Trewynnard	?
Parliament of 1545	John Arundell	Richard Heywood
Parliament of 1547	Thomas Mildmay	John Trengove
First Parliament of 1553 (Mar)	Thomas Mildmay	Robert Docatt
Second Parliament of 1553 (Oct)	William Bendlowes	Henry Trengove alias Nance
First Parliament of 1554 (Apr)	William St Aubyn	John Kyme
Second Parliament of 1554 (Nov)	Reginald Mohun	William St Aubin
Parliament of 1555	Thomas Mildmay	Edward Neville
Parliament of 1558	Thomas Mildmay	Peter Martyn
Parliament of 1559	John Trendeneck	Francis Goldsmith
Parliament of 1562–1567	William Porter	John Dudley
Parliament of 1571	Sir Edward Bray	John Gayer
Parliament of 1572–1581	William Killigrew	John Vivian (died c.1578)
Parliament of 1584–1585	Humphrey Prideaux	William Lewis
Parliament of 1586–1587	Hannibal Vyvyan	William Godolphin
Parliament of 1588–1589	William Buggin	Christopher Osborne
Parliament of 1593	William Gardiner	Ralph Knevitt
Parliament of 1597–1598	William Cooke	Nicholas Saunders
Parliament of 1601	William Twysden	Hannibal Vyvyan
Parliament of 1604–1611	Sir John Leigh	John Bogans (died); Robert Naunton (from 1606)
Addled Parliament (1614)	Sir Robert Killigrew	Henry Bulstrode
Parliament of 1621–1622	Sir Thomas Stafford	William Noy
Happy Parliament (1624–1625)	Thomas Carey	Francis Carew
Useless Parliament (1625)	Thomas Carey	Francis Carew
Parliament of 1625–1626	Francis Godolphin	Francis Carew
Parliament of 1628–1629	Sidney Godolphin	William Noy
No Parliament summoned 1629–1640

=== MPs 1640–1832 ===
Year	First member	First party	Second member	Second party
April 1640	Sidney Godolphin	Royalist	William Godolphin	Royalist
November 1640	Sidney Godolphin	Royalist	Francis Godolphin	Royalist
February 1643	Sidney Godolphin killed in battle – seat vacant		Francis Godolphin	Royalist
January 1644	Sidney Godolphin killed in battle – seat vacant		Francis Godolphin disabled from sitting – seat vacant	
1646	John Penrose		John Thomas	
December 1648	Penrose not recorded as having sat after Pride's Purge		Thomas excluded in Pride's Purge – seat vacant	
1653	Unrepresented in the Barebones Parliament and the First and Second Parliaments of the Protectorate			
January 1659	Robert Rous		Thomas Juxon	
May 1659	Helston was unrepresented in the restored Rump			
April 1660	Anthony Rous		Alexander Penhellick	
July 1660	Thomas Robinson		(Sir) Francis Godolphin	
1661	Thomas Robinson		Sir Peter Killigrew	
1665	Sir William Godolphin, Bt		Sir Peter Killigrew	
1668	Sir William Godolphin, Bt		Sidney Godolphin	Tory
Feb 1679	Sir William Godolphin, Bt		Sir Vyell Vyvyan, Bt	Tory
Sep 1679	Sidney Godolphin	Tory	Sir Vyell Vyvyan, Bt	Tory
1681	Sidney Godolphin	Tory	Charles Godolphin	Tory
1685	Sidney Godolphin	Whig	Charles Godolphin	Tory
1689	Sir John St Aubyn, Bt	Tory	Charles Godolphin	Tory
1695	Francis Godolphin		Charles Godolphin	Tory
1698	Sidney Godolphin	Whig	Charles Godolphin	Tory
1701	Sidney Godolphin	Whig	Francis Godolphin	
1708	Sidney Godolphin	Whig	John Evelyn	
Oct 1710	Sidney Godolphin	Whig	George Granville	Tory
Dec 1710	Sidney Godolphin	Whig	Robert Child	
1713	Henry Campion		Charles Coxe	
1714	Thomas Tonkin		Alexander Pendarves	Tory
1715	Sir Gilbert Heathcote, Bt	Whig	Sidney Godolphin	Whig
1722	Sir Robert Raymond	Tory	Walter Carey	
1724	Sir Clement Wearg	Whig	Walter Carey	
1726	Exton Sayer		Walter Carey	
1727	John Evelyn	Whig	John Harris	Whig
1741	Francis Godolphin		Thomas Walker	Whig
1747	Francis Godolphin		(Sir) John Evelyn	Whig
1766	William Windham		(Sir) John Evelyn	Whig
1767	William Windham		William Evelyn	
1768	The Earl of Clanbrassil		William Evelyn	
1774	Marquess of Carmarthen	Tory	Francis Owen	
1775	Francis Cust		Philip Yorke	
1780	Jocelyn Deane		Philip Yorke	
March 1781	Richard Barwell		Philip Yorke	
June 1781	Richard Barwell		Lord Hyde	Tory
1784	John Rogers		Lord Hyde	Tory
1786	Roger Wilbraham		Lord Hyde	Tory
1787	Roger Wilbraham		James Burges	
1790	Sir Gilbert Elliot, Bt	Whig	Stephen Lushington	Whig
1795	Charles Abbot	Tory	Stephen Lushington	Whig
1796	Charles Abbot	Tory	Richard Richards	
1799	Charles Abbot	Tory	Lord Francis Osborne	
1802	Viscount Fitzharris		John Penn	
1804	Davies Giddy		John Penn	
1805	Davies Giddy		Viscount Primrose	
April 1806	Sir John Shelley, Bt		Viscount Primrose	
November 1806	Nicholas Vansittart	Tory	John de Ponthieu	
January 1807	Thomas Brand	Whig	John de Ponthieu	
May 1807	Sir John St Aubyn, Bt		Richard Richards	
July 1807	Sir John St Aubyn, Bt		The Lord Dufferin and Claneboye	
1812	William Horne	Whig	Hugh Hammersley	
1818	Lord James Townshend	Tory	Harrington Hudson	
1826	Lord James Townshend	Tory	The Marquess of Carmarthen	Tory
1830	Lord James Townshend	Tory	Sir Samuel Brooke-Pechell, Bt	Whig
1831	Lord James Townshend	Tory	Sackville Lane-Fox	Tory
1832	Representation reduced to one member			

=== MPs 1832–1885 ===
Election	Member	Party
1832	Representation reduced to one member	
1832	Sackville Lane-Fox	Conservative
1835	Lord James Townshend	Conservative
1837	Viscount Cantelupe	Conservative
1840 by-election	John Basset	Conservative
1841	Sir Richard Vyvyan, Bt	Conservative
1857	Charles Trueman	Whig
1859	John Jope Rogers	Conservative
1865	Adolphus William Young	Liberal
1866 by-election	Robert Campbell	Liberal
1866 by-election	Sir William Brett	Conservative
1868	Adolphus William Young	Liberal
1880	William Molesworth-St Aubyn	Conservative
1885	constituency abolished	

== Elections ==
=== Elections in the 1880s ===
General election 1880: Helston
Party	Candidate	Votes	%	±%
Conservative	William Molesworth-St Aubyn	466	52.1	+5.1
Liberal	Adolphus William Young	429	47.9	−5.1
Majority		37	4.2	N/A
Turnout		895	84.2	−1.7
Registered electors		1,063		
Conservative gain from Liberal		Swing	+5.1	

=== Elections in the 1870s ===
General election 1874: Helston
Party	Candidate	Votes	%	±%
Liberal	Adolphus William Young	473	53.0	−3.9
Conservative	William Nassau Lees	420	47.0	+3.9
Majority		53	5.0	−7.8
Turnout		893	85.9	+1.5
Registered electors		1,040		
Liberal hold		Swing	−3.9	

=== Elections in the 1860s ===
General election 1868: Helston
Party	Candidate	Votes	%	±%
Liberal	Adolphus William Young	494	56.9	+5.2
Conservative	Thomas Charles Bruce	374	43.1	−5.2
Majority		120	13.8	+10.4
Turnout		868	84.4	−1.2
Registered electors		1,029		
Liberal hold		Swing	+5.2	

By-election, 19 February 1868: Helston
Party	Candidate	Votes	%	±%
Conservative	William Brett	Unopposed		
Conservative gain from Liberal				

- Caused by Brett's appointment as Solicitor General for England and Wales

By-election, 1 May 1866: Helston
Party	Candidate	Votes	%	±%
Conservative	William Brett	153	50.2	+1.9
Liberal	Robert Campbell	152	49.8	−1.9
Majority		1	0.4	N/A
Turnout		305	87.6	+2.0
Registered electors		348		
Conservative gain from Liberal		Swing	+1.9	

- Caused by the 1865 election being declared void on petition, due to bribery. At the original count for the by-election, both candidates received 153 votes apiece, but Campbell was declared elected after the Returning officer (who was the father of his election agent) cast a vote for him, after consulting a legal textbook which suggested he could make the casting vote. A petition was lodged, and a committee decided the returning officer had no right to cast the vote and should have declared both candidates elected. However, on scrutiny one vote was taken from Campbell's total, leaving Brett elected alone. This election led to Parliament deciding that "according to the law and usage of Parliament, it is the duty of the sheriff or other returning officer in England, in the case of an equal number of votes being polled for two or more candidates at an election, to return all such candidates".

General election 1865: Helston
Party	Candidate	Votes	%	±%
Liberal	Adolphus William Young	154	51.7	+6.9
Conservative	Shadwell Morley Grylls	144	48.3	−6.9
Majority		10	3.4	N/A
Turnout		298	85.6	−4.3
Registered electors		348		
Liberal gain from Conservative		Swing	+6.9	

=== Elections in the 1850s ===
General election 1859: Helston
Party	Candidate	Votes	%	±%
Conservative	John Jope Rogers	158	55.2	New
Liberal	Charles Trueman	128	44.8	N/A
Majority		30	10.4	N/A
Turnout		286	89.9	N/A
Registered electors		318		
Conservative gain from Liberal		Swing	N/A	

General election 1857: Helston
Party	Candidate	Votes	%	±%
Whig	Charles Trueman	Unopposed		
Registered electors		309		
Whig gain from Conservative				

General election 1852: Helston
Party	Candidate	Votes	%	±%
Conservative	Richard Vyvyan	Unopposed		
Registered electors		317		
Conservative hold				

=== Elections in the 1840s ===
General election 1847: Helston
Party	Candidate	Votes	%	±%
Conservative	Richard Vyvyan	Unopposed		
Registered electors		385		
Conservative hold				

General election 1841: Helston
Party	Candidate	Votes	%	±%
Conservative	Richard Vyvyan	159	54.5	−1.6
Whig	William Revell Vigors	133	45.5	+1.6
Majority		26	9.0	−3.2
Turnout		292	73.4	−4.5
Registered electors		398		
Conservative hold		Swing	−1.6	

By-election, 12 March 1840: Helston
Party	Candidate	Votes	%	±%
Conservative	John Basset	Unopposed		
Conservative hold				

- Caused by West's resignation, by accepting the office of Steward of the Chiltern Hundreds, in order to contest a by-election at Lewes

=== Elections in the 1830s ===
General election 1837: Helston
Party	Candidate	Votes	%
Conservative	George West	160	56.1
Whig	Arthur William Buller	125	43.9
Majority		35	12.2
Turnout		285	77.9
Registered electors		366	
Conservative hold			

General election 1835: Helston
Party	Candidate	Votes	%
Conservative	James Townshend	Unopposed	
Registered electors		356	
Conservative hold			

General election 1832: Helston
Party	Candidate	Votes	%
Tory	Sackville Lane-Fox	Unopposed	
Registered electors		341	
Tory hold			

General election 1831: Helston
Party	Candidate	Votes	%
Tory	Sackville Lane-Fox	Unopposed	
Tory	James Townshend	Unopposed	
Registered electors		c. 81	
Tory hold			
Tory gain from Whig			

By-election, 1 December 1830: Helston
Party	Candidate	Votes	%
Whig	Samuel Pechell	Unopposed	
Whig hold			

- Caused by Pechell's appointment as a Lord of the Admiralty

General election 1830: Helston
Party	Candidate	Votes	%
Tory	James Townshend	Unopposed	
Whig	Samuel Pechell	Unopposed	
Registered electors		c. 81	
Tory hold			
Whig gain from Tory			
