= Bodrugan =

Bodrugan is a Cornish surname and placename. It may refer to:

== Surname ==
- Henry Bodrugan (died 1308), Cornish landowner, knight and politician
- Nicholas Bodrugan (born by 1521, died 1557 or 1584), alias Adams MP
- Otto Bodrugan (died 1331), Cornish landowner, soldier and politician
- William Bodrugan (disambiguation)
  - William Bodrugan (MP fl. 1420–33), MP for Cornwall
  - William Bodrugan (MP fl. 1384–1401), MP for Cornwall, Helston and Dunheved
  - William Bodrugan (MP died 1416), MP for Cornwall and Liskeard
  - William Bodrugan (priest), Archdeacon of Cornwall and Provost of Glasney College

== Place ==
- Bodrugan, Cornwall
