= John Arundell =

John Arundell or John Arundel may refer to:

== Arundell of Lanherne, Cornwall ==
- Sir John Arundell IV (1336–1376)
- John Arundell (died 1435), 'John The Magnificent'
- John Arundell (died 1423), MP for Devon, 1414 and Cornwall, 1419, 1421 and 1422
- John Arundell (died 1473) of Lanherne, Sheriff of Cornwall
- John Arundell (died 1545) of Lanherne, Receiver General of the Duchy of Cornwall
- John Arundell (died 1557), MP for Cornwall, 1554
- John Arundell (died 1590), MP for Helston, Shaftesbury, Preston and Cornwall

=== Arundell of Tolverne, Cornwall (descended from Lanherne) ===
- John Arundell of Tolverne, High Sheriff of Cornwall in 1510

=== Arundell of Wardour, Wiltshire (descended from Lanherne) ===
- John Arundell, 16th Baron Arundell of Wardour (1907–1944), army officer

== Arundell of Trerice, Cornwall ==
- John Arundell (admiral) (1495–1561), Vice-admiral of the West
- John Arundell (died 1580), his son, Cornish MP
- John Arundell (born 1576) (1576 – c. 1656), his son, Cornish MP and Governor of Pendennis Castle during the English Civil Wars
- John Arundell (Royalist) (1613–1644), son of the above, MP for Bodmin
- John Arundell, 2nd Baron Arundell of Trerice (1649–1698), MP for Truro
- John Arundell, 3rd Baron Arundell of Trerice (1649–1706)
- John Arundell, 4th Baron Arundell of Trerice (1701–1768)

== Arundel of Sussex ==
- John Climping (died 1262), also known as John Arundel or John of Arundel, Bishop of Chichester, 1253–1262
- John Arundel (bishop of Chichester) or Arundell (died 1477), Bishop of Chichester, 1459–1477
- John Arundel (bishop of Exeter) (died 1504), also spelt Arundell, Bishop of Lichfield and Coventry, 1496–1502 and Exeter, 1502–1504
- John FitzAlan, 1st Baron Arundel (c.1348–1379), also known as Sir John Arundel, soldier

== Others ==
- John Arundel (ice hockey) (1927–2002), Canadian hockey player
- John T. Arundel (1841–1919), English entrepreneur and businessman, vice-chairman of the Pacific Islands Company
