= William Bodrugan =

William Bodrugan may refer to:

- William Bodrugan (priest) (c. 1250–1307), Archdeacon of Cornwall and Provost of Glasney College
- William Bodrugan (fl. 1384–1401), MP for Cornwall, Helston and Dunheved
- William Bodrugan (died 1416), MP for Cornwall and Liskeard
- William Bodrugan (fl. 1420–1433), MP for Cornwall
