= Manor of Haccombe =

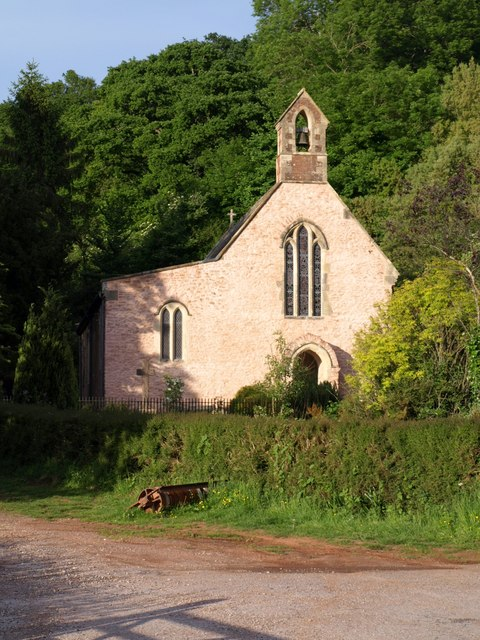
St Blaise's Church, Haccombe, which contains many effigies and monumental brasses

The manor of Haccombe was a historic manor in the small parish of Haccombe, near the town of Newton Abbot, Devon, England. It was the seat of important branches of the Courtenay and Carew families.

== Descent of the manor ==
The descent of the manor of Haccombe was as follows:

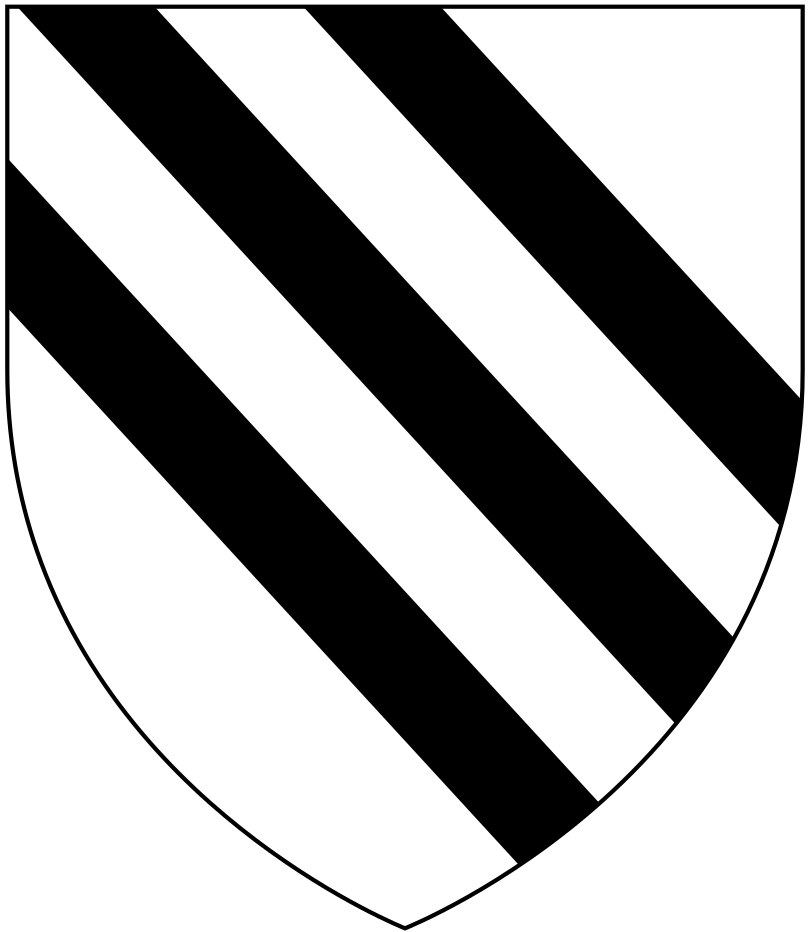
Arms of de Haccombe

=== de Haccombe ===
The earliest recorded holder of the manor was the de Haccombe family, which as was usual took its surname from the manor.

- Stephen de Haccombe, who is recorded as holding the manor in 1242.
- Sir Jordan de Haccombe, successor
- Sir Stephen de Haccombe, successor
- Jordan de Haccombe, successor, who married the daughter and heiress of Mauger de St Awbin, but left no sons, only a daughter and sole-heiress Cecily de Haccombe, wife of Sir John Arcedekne (alias l'Arcedekne, Archdekne, Archdeacon, etc) to whom passed the manor.

=== Arcedekne ===
Arms of Arcedekne. These are also the arms of the French commune of Erchin in northern France

- Sir John Arcedekne (1306 – c. 1377) of Ruan Lanihorne Castle in Cornwall, married Cecily de Haccombe, heiress of Haccombe. He was the son and heir of Thomas Arcedekne, 1st Baron Arcedekne (died 1331) of Ruan Lanihorne, Governor of Tintagel Castle in 1312 and Sheriff of Cornwall 1313–14, who was summoned by writ to Parliament in 1321, whereby he became Baron Arcedekne. Sir John Arcedekne and his descendants were never again summoned to Parliament in respect of their father's barony, and The Complete Peerage does not list them as holders of that peerage. He fought in France in 1345. He was a cousin of his wife Cecily de Haccombe, "within the fourth degree of consanguinity", and therefore in 1327 obtained a papal dispensation for the marriage to proceed. By Cecily de Haccombe he had (in the words of Risdon (died 1640)) "A fruitful progeny especially of issue male". However, of his nine sons only two left children, namely Sir Warin Arcedekne, second son and eventual heir; and the third son Richard Arcedekne whose son Richard Arcedekne died childless.
- Sir Warin Arcedekne (d.1400), second son and heir, also of Ruan Lanihorn, Cornwall, a Member of Parliament for Cornwall in 1380 and 1382, who married Elizabeth Talbot (d.1407), a daughter of Sir John Talbot of Richard's Castle in Herefordshire and a co-heiress of her brother John Talbot (d.1388). By his marriage he acquired extensive estates in six other counties. He left no sons, only four daughters and co-heiresses:
  - Eleanor Arcedekne, wife of Sir Walter Lucy of Dallington, Northamptonshire and Cublington, Buckinghamshire.
  - Phillipa Arcedekne, eventual heiress of Haccombe, the second wife of Sir Hugh Courtenay (c. 1358–1425).
  - Margery Arcedekne (d.1420), wife of Thomas Arundell (d.1443), of Tolverne in Philleigh, Cornwall (2nd son of John Arundell (1366–1435), The Magnificent, of Lanherne) four times a Member of Parliament for Cornwall.
  - Elizabeth Arcedekne, wife of Otto Trevarthian, a son of John Trevarthian (c.1360-1402), of Trevarthian in St. Hilary, Cornwall, MP.

Arms of Courtenay

=== Courtenay ===
- Sir Hugh Courtenay (c. 1358–1425), of Haccombe and of Boconnoc in Cornwall, who married as his second wife Phillipa Arcedekne, heiress of Haccombe. He was a Member of Parliament and Sheriff of Devon, a grandson of Hugh de Courtenay, 2nd/10th Earl of Devon (1303–1377), was the younger brother of Edward de Courtenay, 3rd/11th Earl of Devon (1357–1419), "The Blind Earl", and by his third wife was the grandfather of Edward Courtenay, 1st Earl of Devon (died 1509), KG, created Earl of Devon in 1485 by King Henry VII.

His marriage to Phillipa Archdekne was without male children, but did produce a daughter Joane Courtenay (born 1411), the wife of Nicholas Carew of Mohuns Ottery in Devon, and the eventual sole-heiress of her mother Phillipa Archdekne, from whom she inherited 16 manors including Haccombe, which she divided amongst her younger Carew sons.

=== Carew ===
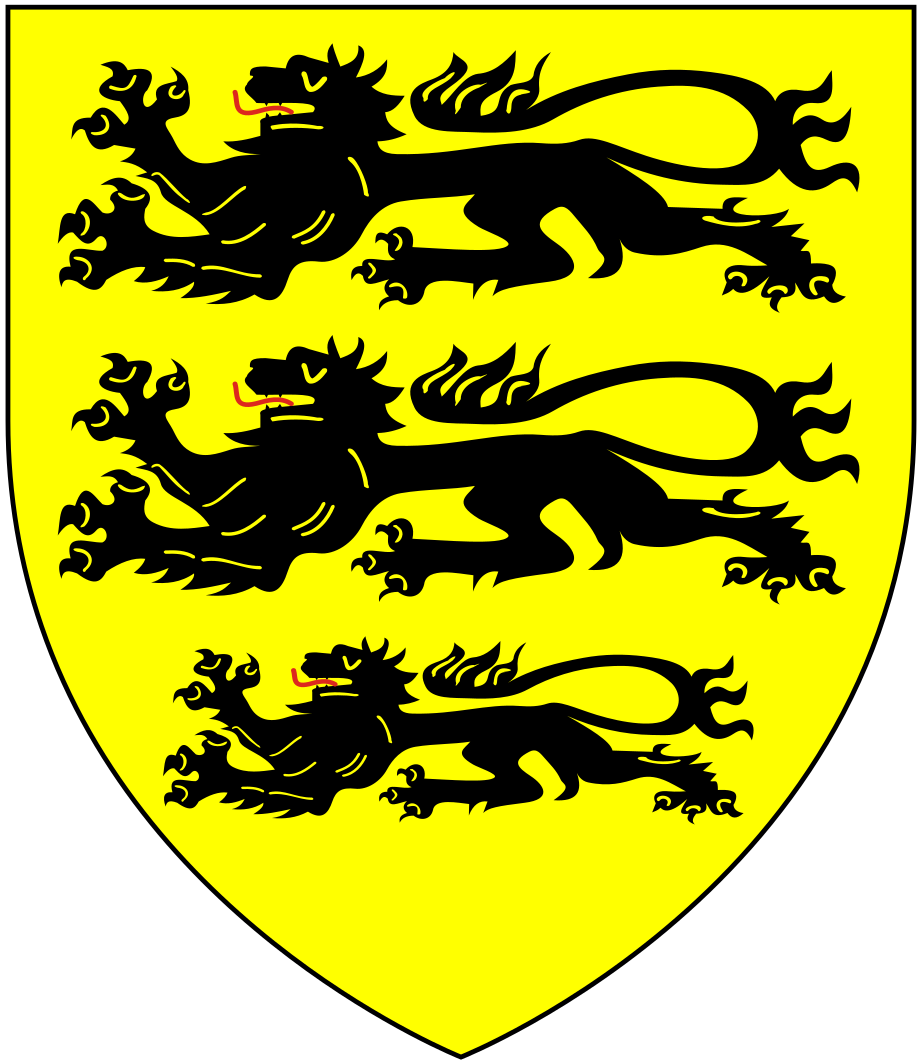
Arms of Carew

==== Nicholas Carew ====
Nicholas Carew of Mohuns Ottery in Devon, who married Joane Courtenay (born 1411), a daughter of Sir Hugh Courtenay (1358–1425) of Haccombe and of Boconnoc. As her eldest son was already well provided for as the heir to his father's estates of Mohuns Ottery and others under primogeniture, Joane Courtenay gave Haccombe to her second son Nicholas Carew, who founded there a prominent junior branch of the Carew family. (See Carew baronets (1661) of Haccombe).

Risdon however states the reason for Joan Courtenay having passed over her eldest son in distributing the Haccombe estates was "for some defect of a due respect to his mother (as she conceived)".

The Carew family of Haccombe obtained a baronetcy in 1661, still extant today, and continued to reside at that estate until the 19th century, having earlier inherited further estates from other advantageous marriages, including Bickleigh, inherited by Sir Thomas Carew, 1st Baronet (died 1673/4) following his first marriage to Elizabeth Carew, eldest daughter and co-heiress of Sir Henry Carew of Bickleigh and Tiverton Castle, the ancient seat of the Courtenay Earls of Devon, which latter was inherited by Sir Thomas Carew, 4th Baronet of Haccombe from his marriage to Dorothy West, a daughter and co-heiress of Peter West of Tiverton Castle.

Joan Courtenay survived her husband and married secondly, by royal licence dated 5 October 1450, Sir Robert Vere, second son of Richard de Vere, 11th Earl of Oxford, by whom she had a son, John Vere, father of John de Vere, 15th Earl of Oxford.

==== Nicholas Carew (died 1469) ====
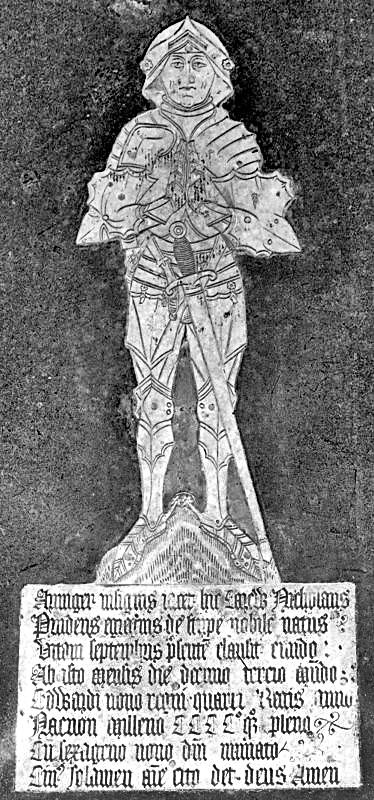
Photograph of monumental brass of Nicholas Carew, Haccombe Church

Nicholas Carew (died 1469), second son, was given Haccombe by his mother Joan Courtenay. He married Anna Crocker, "widow of John Seymour" and a daughter of Sir John Crocker (died 1508) of Lyneham in the parish of Yealmpton, Devon, a Member of Parliament for Devon in 1491, whose inscribed monumental brass, showing him dressed in armour, survives in Yealmpton Church.

The well-known and fine small monumental brass of Nicholas Carew, "in spiky armour", between four heraldic escutcheons displaying the arms of Carew, survives set into a ledger stone on the floor of the chancel of Haccombe Church, on the south side of the effigy of Sir Stephen de Haccombe. It was described as follows by Stabb (died 1917): "The armour is very rich; on his head is a visored salade raised to show the face; on the shoulder are paldrons, and on the right shoulder a peculiarly shaped plate of steel, called a moton; the hands, which wear gauntlets, are joined in prayer; the elbow and knee plates are large. The sword, which hangs in front, is long and reaches to the feet, the latter having spurs on the heels".

==== John Carew (d.1528) ====
John Carew (d.1528) of Haccombe, son and heir, who was a commander in the army (called Exercitus Anglicorum et Gallorum Regnum pro Pontifice Romano Liberando Congregatus "The army of the Kingdoms of the English and of the French gathered together for the liberating of the Roman Pope") sent into Italy in 1527 jointly by Kings Francis I of France and Henry VIII of England and under the command of Odet of Foix, Viscount of Lautrec, in order to rescue Pope Clement VII, then besieged in his Castel Sant'Angelo, following the Sack of Rome on 6 May 1527 by troops of Charles V, Holy Roman Emperor.

On 6 June 1527 the siege was lifted and Clement VII surrendered to the imperial troops, having agreed to pay a large ransom. Carew died at Pavia in 1528, soon after the pope's release. Carew married Katherine Zouch, a daughter of John la Zouche, 7th Baron Zouche, 8th Baron St Maur (1459–1526), who survived her husband and remarried to Sir Robert Brandon, an uncle of Charles Brandon, 1st Duke of Suffolk.

==== John Carew (d.1529) ====
John Carew (d.1529) of Haccombe, eldest son and heir, who survived his father by just one year. He married Elizabeth Martyn, a daughter of Christopher Martyn and sister of Richard Martyn.

==== Thomas Carew (1518–1586) ====
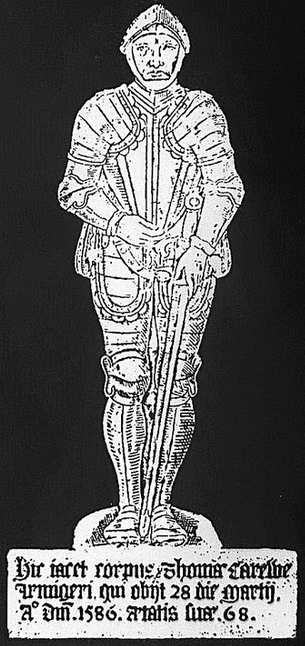
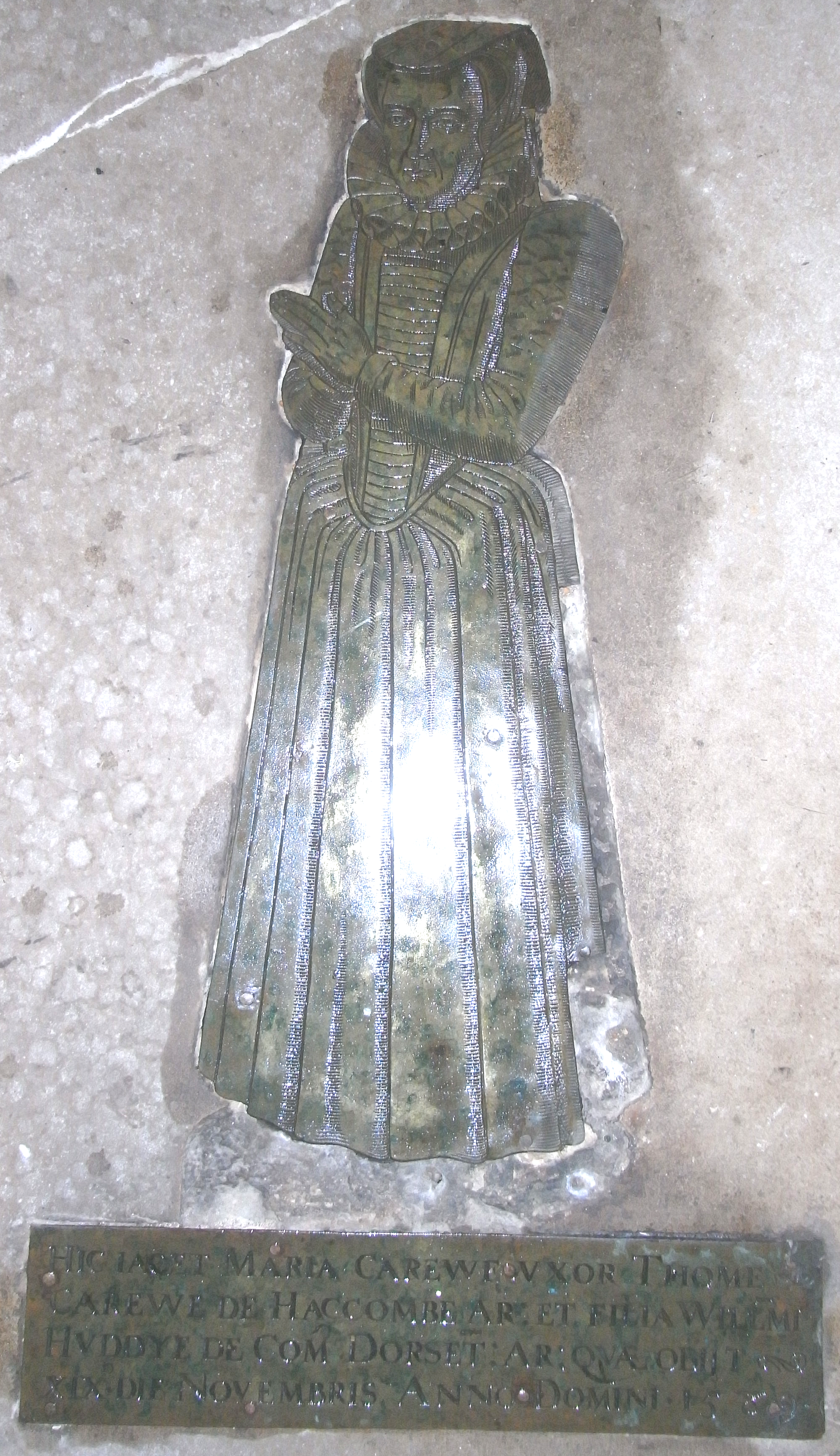
Left: Rubbing of monumental brass of Thomas Carew; right: Brass of his wife Mary Hody. Both in Haccombe Church

Thomas Carew (died 1586) of Haccombe, eldest son and heir. He was a minor aged 11 at the death of his father and his wardship was acquired by William Hody (died 1535) of Pilsdon in Dorset, whose will directed "that his executors, Anne (Strode) his wife, and John his son, shall have ward of Thomas Carewe, son and heir of John Carewe, late of Haccombe, Devon, for the use of Mary, his daughter." Thomas Carew was thus duly married-off to Mary Hody (died 1589), a daughter of William Hody (died 1535) of "Pillistone" in Dorset, by his second wife Anne Strode, a daughter of John Strode of Chalmington in Dorset. Mary's grandfather was Sir William Hody (born before 1441, died 1524) of Pilsdon, Attorney General for England and Wales and Chief Baron of the Exchequer under King Henry VII. Thomas Carew died aged 68 on 28 March 1586 of "Gaol Fever", following his attendance as a magistrate at the notorious Black Assize of Exeter.

His monumental brass survives in Haccombe Church, on the floor of the chancel, near those of his wife and his great-grandfather Nicholas Carew (died 1469).

Sir Rivers Carew Bt assigned the Manor of Haccombe with Combeinteignhead to Colonel Gerald Arnold, together with the Patronage of the Benefice of Haccombe, Combeinteignhead. Stokeinteignhead, Ringmore and Shaldon in March 2010.

== Sources ==
- Pole, Sir William (died 1635), Collections Towards a Description of the County of Devon, Sir John-William de la Pole (ed.), London, 1791.
- Risdon, Tristram (died 1640), Survey of Devon. With considerable additions. London, 1811.
- Vivian, Lt.Col. J.L., (Ed.) The Visitations of the County of Devon: Comprising the Heralds' Visitations of 1531, 1564 & 1620. Exeter, 1895.
- Prince, John, (1643–1723) The Worthies of Devon, 1810 edition, London, pp. 164–167, descent of Haccombe, with descriptions and transcripts of several monuments in Haccombe Church.
