= Cornwall (constituency) =

Former parliamentary constituency in the United Kingdom

- Former county constituency for the House of Commons
- County: Cornwall

1290–1832
- Seats: Two
- Replaced by: East Cornwall and West Cornwall

Cornwall is a former county constituency covering the county of Cornwall, in the South West of England. It was a constituency of the House of Commons of England then of the House of Commons of Great Britain from 1707 to 1800 and of the House of Commons of the United Kingdom from 1801 to 1832. It was represented by two Knights of the Shire, elected by the bloc vote system.

Under the Reform Act 1832, it was divided between the constituencies of East Cornwall and West Cornwall.

== Boundaries and franchise ==
The constituency consisted of the whole of the historic county of Cornwall, the most south-westerly county of England, occupying the part of the South West peninsula to the west of the River Tamar which divides the county from Devon. (Although Cornwall contained a number of parliamentary boroughs, each of which elected two MPs in their own right, these were not excluded from the county constituency, and owning property within a borough could confer a vote at the county election. For a summary of the boroughs represented before 1832 see Parliamentary representation from Cornwall.)

As in other county constituencies the franchise between 1430 and 1832 was defined by the Forty Shilling Freeholder Act, which gave the right to vote to every man who possessed freehold property within the county valued at £2 or more per year for the purposes of land tax; it was not necessary for the freeholder to occupy his land, nor even in later years to be resident in the county at all.

By the time of the Great Reform Act in 1832, the population of Cornwall was about 300,000. Only a tiny fraction of these were entitled to vote. Sedgwick estimated there were about 2,300 electors in this constituency in the 1715–1754 period, and Namier and Brooke suggest this had increased to about 2,500 electors in the 1754–1790 period. At the vigorously contested election of 1790, when a high turnout can be assumed, 4,656 valid votes were cast (each voter being entitled to vote twice). At Cornwall's final election, in 1831, 5,350 votes were cast.

== Members of Parliament ==
- Constituency created (1290)

=== 1290–1510 ===
Parliament	First member	Second member
1298	Thomas Pridias	
1301	Michael Petyt	
1307	Henry Bodrugan	
1314	Michael Petyt	
1324	Otto Bodrugan	William Hureward
1336	William Bodrugan	Richard Hiwis
1337	William Bodrugan	Richard Hiwis
1341	Ralph Speccot of Speccot, Merton, Devon	
1357	John Hamely	
1360	John Hamely	
1362	John Hamely	
1366	John de Tremayne	
1369	Otto Bodrugan	Robert Tresilian/John de Tremayne
1380	Warin Archdeacon	
1382	Warin Archdeacon	
1383 (Feb)	Michael Archdeacon	
1384	Otto Bodrugan	
1386	Sir Ralph Carminowe	John Beville
1388 (Feb)	Sir Henry Ilcombe	Sir John Reskymer
1388 (Sep)	Sir William Lambourne	Sir John Reskymer
1390 (Jan)	Sir Richard Cergeaux	Sir William Lambourne
1390 (Nov)	Sir John Reskymer	Michael Archdeacon
1391	John Colshull	John Treverbyn
1393	John Trevarthian	John Treverbyn
1394	John Colshull	John Treverbyn
1395	Sir Henry Ilcombe	John Chenduyt
1397 (Jan)	John Arundell of Lanherne	John Colshull
1397 (Sep)	John Arundell of Lanherne	John Trevarthian
1399	Sir William Lambourne	John Colshull
1401	Sir John Trevarthian	William Bodrugan
1402	Sir William Talbot	John Whalesborough
1404 (Jan)	Sir John Arundell of Lanherne	John Chenduyt
1404 (Oct)	Sir John Arundell of Lanherne	Sir Ralph Botreaux
1406	Sir John Arundell of Lanherne	Nicholas Broomford
1407	John Chenduyt	Richard Trevanion
1410	Sir Ralph Botreaux	Sir John Herle
1411	Sir John Arundell of Lanherne	John Urban
1413 (May)	John Wybbury	John Trelawny
1414 (Apr)	Sir John Arundell of Lanherne	John Colshull II
1414 (Nov)	Sir William Talbot	John Colshull II
1416 (Mar)	Sir John Arundell of Lanherne	William Bodrugan II
1416 (Oct)		
1417	Sir John Arundell of Lanherne	Thomas Arundell
1419	John Arundell	Sir Thomas Arundell
1420	Sir William Bodrugan	John Tretherf
1421 (May)	Sir John Arundell of Lanherne	Sir John Trelawny
1421 (Dec)	Sir John Trelawny	John Arundell
1422	Sir John Arundell of Lanherne	John Arundell
1423	Sir John Arundell of Lanherne	
1429	Sir Thomas Arundell	
1435	Sir Thomas Arundell	
1437	Nicholas Aysshton	
1439	Nicholas Aysshton	
1453–4	John Coleshill, of Duloe, Cornwall	
1472	Sir Henry Bodrugan	
1478	Sir Thomas Vaughan	
1483	John Beaumont alias Bodrugan	James Tyrrell
1484	John Beaumont alias Bodrugan	

=== 1510–1629 ===
As there were sometimes significant gaps between Parliaments held in this period, the dates of first assembly and dissolution are given. Where the name of the member has not yet been ascertained or (before 1558) is not recorded in a surviving document, the entry unknown is entered in the table.

The Roman numerals after some names are those used in The House of Commons 1509–1558 to distinguish a member from another politician of the same name.

In 1529 alternative versions are given of the names for one member. The first comes from the above book on the House of Commons. The second originates from another source.

Elected	Assembled	Dissolved	First Member	Second Member
1510	21 January 1510	23 February 1510	unknown	unknown
1512	4 February 1512	4 March 1514	unknown	unknown
1515	5 February 1515	22 December 1515	Sir Peter Edgecombe	unknown
1523	15 April 1523	13 August 1523	unknown	unknown
1529	3 November 1529	14 April 1536	Sir Peter Edgecombe	Richard Grenville
1536	8 June 1536	18 July 1536	unknown	unknown
1539	28 April 1539	24 July 1540	Sir John Chamond	William Godolphin I
1542	16 January 1542	28 March 1544	Richard Edgcumbe	unknown
1545	23 November 1545	31 January 1547	Richard Chamond	John Beauchamp
1547	4 November 1547	15 April 1552	(Sir) Richard Edgecumbe	John Reskymer
1553	1 March 1553	31 March 1553	(Sir) William Godolphin I	Henry Chiverton
1553	5 October 1553	5 December 1553	John Carminowe	Richard Roscarrock
1554	2 April 1554	3 May 1554	Sir John Arundell	Richard Roscarrock
1554	12 November 1554	16 January 1555	? Thomas Trefry I	Henry Chiverton
1555	21 October 1555	9 December 1555	Richard Chamond	Henry Chiverton
1558	20 January 1558	17 November 1558	John Arundell	John Polwhele
1559	23 January 1559	8 May 1559	John Trelawny	Richard Chamond
1562 or 1563	11 January 1563	2 January 1567	Peter Edgcumbe	John Trelawny died and repl. 1566 by Richard Chamond
1571	2 April 1571	29 May 1571	Richard Grenville	William Mohun
1572	8 May 1572	19 April 1583	Peter Edgcumbe to 1581 (Unknown from 1581)	Richard Chamond
1584	23 November 1584	14 September 1585	Richard Grenville	(Sir) William Mohun
1586	13 October 1586	23 March 1587	Peter Edgcumbe	(Sir) William Mohun
1588	4 February 1589	29 March 1589	Peter Edgcumbe	Sir Francis Godolphin
1593	18 February 1593	10 April 1593	Peter Edgcumbe	William Bevil
1597	24 October 1597	9 February 1598	William Killigrew	Jonathan Trelawny
1601	27 October 1601	19 December 1601	Sir Walter Raleigh	John Arundell
1604	19 March 1604	9 February 1611	Sir Anthony Rous	Sir Jonathan Trelawny died 1604; Sir William Godolphin
1614	5 April 1614	7 June 1614	Richard Carew	John St Aubyn
1620 or 1621	16 January 1621	8 February 1622	Bevil Grenville	John Arundell
1623 or 1624	12 February 1624	27 March 1625	Bevil Grenville	William Coryton
1625	17 May 1625	12 August 1625	Sir Robert Killigrew	Charles Trevanion
1626	6 February 1626	15 June 1626	Sir Francis Godolphin	William Coryton
1628	17 March 1628	10 March 1629	Sir John Eliot	William Coryton

=== 1640–1832 ===
Year	First member	First party	Second member	Second party
April 1640	William Godolphin		Richard Buller	Parliamentarian
November 1640	Sir Bevil Grenville	Royalist	Alexander Carew	Royalist
September 1642	Grenville disabled to sit – seat vacant		Alexander Carew	Royalist
September 1643	Grenville disabled to sit – seat vacant		Carew expelled – seat vacant	
1646	Hugh Boscawen		Nicholas Trefusis	
December 1648	Boscawen not recorded as sitting after Pride's Purge		Trefusis excluded in Pride's Purge – seat vacant	

- Representation increased to four seats in Barebones Parliament

Year	First member	Second member	Third member	Fourth member
1653	Robert Bennet	Francis Langdon	Anthony Rous	John Bawden

- Representation increased to eight seats in First and Second Protectorate Parliaments

Year	First member	Second member	Third member	Fourth member	Fifth member	Sixth member	Seventh member	Eighth member
1654	Anthony Rous	Anthony Nicholl	Thomas Silly	Richard Carter	Walter Moyle	Charles Boscawen	Thomas Gewen	James Launce
1656	Anthony Rous	Anthony Nicholl	Thomas Silly	Richard Carter	Walter Moyle	Francis Rous	William Braddon	John St Aubyn

- Representation restored to two seats in Third Protectorate Parliament

Year	First member	First party	Second member	Second party
January 1659	Hugh Boscawen		Francis Buller	
Cornwall not represented in restored Rump				
April 1660	Sir John Carew, Bt		Robert Robartes	
September 1660	Sir John Carew, Bt		Hugh Boscawen	
1661	Jonathan Trelawny		Sir John Coryton, Bt	
1679	Francis Robartes		Sir Richard Edgcumbe	
May 1685	Lord Lansdown		Viscount Bodmin	
August 1685	Lord Lansdown		Francis Robartes	
1689	Sir John Carew, Bt		Hugh Boscawen	
1690	Francis Robartes		Hugh Boscawen	
1695	John Speccot		Hugh Boscawen	
June 1701	John Speccot		Richard Edgcumbe	Whig
December 1701	John Granville		James Buller	
1703	Sir Richard Vyvyan, Bt	Tory	James Buller	
1703	Sir Richard Vyvyan, Bt	Tory	Hugh Boscawen	Whig
1708	James Buller		Hugh Boscawen	Whig
1710	George Granville	Tory	John Trevanion	Tory
1712	Sir Richard Vyvyan, Bt	Tory	John Trevanion	Tory
1713	Sir William Carew, Bt	Tory	John Trevanion	Tory
1722	Sir William Carew, Bt	Tory	Sir John St Aubyn, Bt	Tory
April 1744	Sir Coventry Carew, Bt	Tory	Sir John St Aubyn, Bt	Tory
December 1744	Sir Coventry Carew, Bt	Tory	Sir John Molesworth, Bt	Tory
1748	James Buller	Tory	Sir John Molesworth, Bt	Tory
1761	James Buller	Tory	Sir John St Aubyn, Bt	
1765	Sir John Molesworth, Bt		Sir John St Aubyn, Bt	
1772	Sir John Molesworth, Bt		Humphrey Mackworth-Praed	
1774	Sir John Molesworth, Bt		Sir William Lemon, Bt	Whig
1775	Edward Eliot		Sir William Lemon, Bt	Whig
1784	Sir William Molesworth, Bt		Sir William Lemon, Bt	Whig
1790	Francis Gregor	Tory	Sir William Lemon, Bt	Whig
1806	John Hearle Tremayne	Tory	Sir William Lemon, Bt	Whig
1825	John Hearle Tremayne	Tory	Sir Richard Rawlinson Vyvyan, Bt	Tory
1826	Edward William Wynne Pendarves	Whig	Sir Richard Rawlinson Vyvyan, Bt	Tory
1831	Edward William Wynne Pendarves	Whig	Sir Charles Lemon, Bt	Whig

- Constituency abolished (1832)

== Elections ==
The bloc vote electoral system was used in two seat elections and first past the post for single member by-elections. Each elector had as many votes as there were seats to be filled. Votes had to be cast by a spoken declaration, in public, at the hustings, which were usually held at the county town. The expense and difficulty of voting at only one location in the county, together with the lack of a secret ballot contributed to the corruption and intimidation of electors, which was widespread in the unreformed British political system.

The expense, to candidates and their supporters, of contested elections encouraged the leading families of the county to agree on the candidates to be returned unopposed whenever possible. Contested county elections were therefore unusual.

There were no contested general election polls in Cornwall between 1710 and 1774. Leading Whig politicians, like Sir Robert Walpole, were happy to let Tory squires represent the county; to avoid them interfering with Whig plans in the county's numerous borough constituencies. The related families of Carew, Molesworth, St Aubyn and Buller monopolised the representation for much of the 18th century, until the partners in the Miners' Bank at Truro, Humphrey Mackworth Praed and William Lemon, became involved in elections in the 1770s.

Note on percentage change calculations: Where there was only one candidate of a party in successive elections, for the same number of seats, change is calculated on the party percentage vote. Where there was more than one candidate, in one or both successive elections for the same number of seats, then change is calculated on the individual percentage vote.

Note on sources: The information for the election results given below is taken from Sedgwick 1715–1754, Namier and Brooke 1754–1790 and Stooks Smith 1790–1832.

1710s – 1720s – 1730s – 1740s – 1750s – 1760s – 1770s – 1780s – 1790s – 1800s – 1810s – 1820s – 1830s

=== Elections in the 1710s ===
General election 16 February 1715: Cornwall (2 seats)
Party	Candidate	Votes	%	±%
Tory	Sir William Carew, Bt	Unopposed	N/A	N/A
Tory	John Trevanion	Unopposed	N/A	N/A

=== Elections in the 1720s ===
General election 2 May 1722: Cornwall (2 seats)
Party	Candidate	Votes	%	±%
Tory	Sir William Carew, Bt	Unopposed	N/A	N/A
Tory	Sir John St Aubyn, Bt	Unopposed	N/A	N/A

General election 13 September 1727: Cornwall (2 seats)
Party	Candidate	Votes	%	±%
Tory	Sir William Carew, Bt	Unopposed	N/A	N/A
Tory	Sir John St Aubyn, Bt	Unopposed	N/A	N/A

=== Elections in the 1730s ===
General election 15 May 1734: Cornwall (2 seats)
Party	Candidate	Votes	%	±%
Tory	Sir William Carew, Bt	Unopposed	N/A	N/A
Tory	Sir John St Aubyn, Bt	Unopposed	N/A	N/A

=== Elections in the 1740s ===
General election 20 May 1741: Cornwall (2 seats)
Party	Candidate	Votes	%	±%
Tory	Sir William Carew, Bt	Unopposed	N/A	N/A
Tory	Sir John St Aubyn, Bt	Unopposed	N/A	N/A

- Death of Carew

By-Election 4 April 1744: Cornwall
Party	Candidate	Votes	%	±%
Tory	Sir Coventry Carew, Bt	Unopposed	N/A	N/A
Tory hold		Swing	N/A	

- Death of St Aubyn

By-Election 12 December 1744: Cornwall
Party	Candidate	Votes	%	±%
Tory	Sir John Molesworth, Bt	Unopposed	N/A	N/A
Tory hold		Swing	N/A	

General election 22 July 1747: Cornwall (2 seats)
Party	Candidate	Votes	%	±%
Tory	Sir Coventry Carew, Bt	Unopposed	N/A	N/A
Tory	Sir John Molesworth, Bt	Unopposed	N/A	N/A

- Death of Carew

By-Election 27 April 1748: Cornwall
Party	Candidate	Votes	%	±%
Tory	James Buller	Unopposed	N/A	N/A
Tory hold		Swing	N/A	

=== Elections in the 1750s ===
General election 1 May 1754: Cornwall (2 seats)
Party	Candidate	Votes	%	±%
Tory	Sir John Molesworth, Bt	Unopposed	N/A	N/A
Tory	James Buller	Unopposed	N/A	N/A

=== Elections in the 1760s ===
General election 8 April 1761: Cornwall (2 seats)
Party	Candidate	Votes	%	±%
Nonpartisan	Sir John St Aubyn, Bt	Unopposed	N/A	N/A
Tory	James Buller	Unopposed	N/A	N/A

- Death of Buller

By-Election 15 May 1765: Cornwall
Party	Candidate	Votes	%	±%
Nonpartisan	John Molesworth	Unopposed	N/A	N/A
Nonpartisan gain from Tory		Swing	N/A	

General election 29 March 1768: Cornwall (2 seats)
Party	Candidate	Votes	%	±%
Nonpartisan	Sir John St Aubyn, Bt	Unopposed	N/A	N/A
Nonpartisan	Sir John Molesworth, Bt	Unopposed	N/A	N/A

=== Elections in the 1770s ===
- Death of St Aubyn

By-Election 16 December 1772: Cornwall
Party	Candidate	Votes	%	±%
Nonpartisan	Humphrey Mackworth Praed	Elected	N/A	N/A
Nonpartisan	William Lemon	Defeated		N/A
Nonpartisan hold		Swing	N/A	

General election 25 October 1774: Cornwall (2 seats)
Party	Candidate	Votes	%	±%
Nonpartisan	Sir William Lemon, Bt	1,099	27.48	N/A
Nonpartisan	Sir John Molesworth	1,050	26.26	N/A
Nonpartisan	John Buller, junior	960	24.01	N/A
Nonpartisan	Humphrey Mackworth Praed	890	22.26	N/A
Turnout		3,999	N/A	N/A

- Death of Molesworth

By-Election 15 November 1775: Cornwall
Party	Candidate	Votes	%	±%
Nonpartisan	Edward Eliot	Unopposed	N/A	N/A
Nonpartisan hold		Swing	N/A	

=== Elections in the 1780s ===
General election 13 September 1780: Cornwall (2 seats)
Party	Candidate	Votes	%	±%
Nonpartisan	Sir William Lemon, Bt	Unopposed	N/A	N/A
Nonpartisan	Edward Eliot	Unopposed	N/A	N/A

- Creation of Eliot as 1st Lord Eliot

By-Election 25 February 1784: Cornwall
Party	Candidate	Votes	%	±%
Nonpartisan	Sir William Molesworth, Bt	Unopposed	N/A	N/A
Nonpartisan hold		Swing	N/A	

General election 21 April 1784: Cornwall (2 seats)
Party	Candidate	Votes	%	±%
Nonpartisan	Sir William Molesworth, Bt	Unopposed	N/A	N/A
Nonpartisan	Sir William Lemon, Bt	Unopposed	N/A	N/A

=== Elections in the 1790s ===
General election 1790: Cornwall (2 seats)
Party	Candidate	Votes	%	±%
Whig	Sir William Lemon, Bt	2,250	48.32	N/A
Tory	Francis Gregor	1,270	27.28	N/A
Whig	Sir Jonathan St Aubyn, Bt	1,136	24.40	N/A
Turnout		4,656	N/A	N/A

- Note (1790): This was the first election, for this constituency, where Stooks Smith used party labels for candidates.

General election 1796: Cornwall (2 seats)
Party	Candidate	Votes	%	±%
Whig	Sir William Lemon, Bt	Unopposed	N/A	N/A
Tory	Francis Gregor	Unopposed	N/A	N/A

=== Elections in the 1800s ===
General election 1802: Cornwall (2 seats)
Party	Candidate	Votes	%	±%
Whig	Sir William Lemon, Bt	Unopposed	N/A	N/A
Tory	Francis Gregor	Unopposed	N/A	N/A

General election 1806: Cornwall (2 seats)
Party	Candidate	Votes	%	±%
Whig	Sir William Lemon, Bt	Unopposed	N/A	N/A
Tory	John Hearle Tremayne	Unopposed	N/A	N/A

General election 1807: Cornwall (2 seats)
Party	Candidate	Votes	%	±%
Whig	Sir William Lemon, Bt	Unopposed	N/A	N/A
Tory	John Hearle Tremayne	Unopposed	N/A	N/A

=== Elections in the 1810s ===
General election 1812: Cornwall (2 seats)
Party	Candidate	Votes	%	±%
Whig	Sir William Lemon, Bt	Unopposed	N/A	N/A
Tory	John Hearle Tremayne	Unopposed	N/A	N/A

General election 1818: Cornwall (2 seats)
Party	Candidate	Votes	%	±%
Whig	Sir William Lemon, Bt	Unopposed	N/A	N/A
Tory	John Hearle Tremayne	Unopposed	N/A	N/A

=== Elections in the 1820s ===
General election 1820: Cornwall (2 seats)
Party	Candidate	Votes	%	±%
Whig	Sir William Lemon, Bt	Unopposed	N/A	N/A
Tory	John Hearle Tremayne	Unopposed	N/A	N/A

- Death of Lemon

By-Election February 1825: Cornwall
Party	Candidate	Votes	%	±%
Tory	Sir Richard Rawlinson Vyvyan, Bt	Unopposed	N/A	N/A
Tory gain from Whig		Swing	N/A	

General election 1826: Cornwall (2 seats)
Party	Candidate	Votes	%	±%
Tory	Sir Richard Rawlinson Vyvyan, Bt	Unopposed	N/A	N/A
Whig	Edward William Wynne Pendarves	Unopposed	N/A	N/A

=== Elections in the 1830s ===
General election 1830: Cornwall (2 seats)
Party	Candidate	Votes	%	±%
Tory	Sir Richard Rawlinson Vyvyan, Bt	Unopposed	N/A	N/A
Whig	Edward William Wynne Pendarves	Unopposed	N/A	N/A

General election 1831: Cornwall (2 seats)
Party	Candidate	Votes	%	±%
Whig	Edward William Wynne Pendarves	1,819	35.42	N/A
Whig	Sir Charles Lemon, Bt	1,804	35.13	N/A
Tory	Sir Richard Rawlinson Vyvyan, Bt	901	17.55	N/A
Tory	Viscount Valletort	611	11.90	N/A
Majority		903	17.58	N/A
Whig gain from Tory		Swing		
Turnout		5,135	N/A	N/A

- Note (1831): Stooks Smith records that the poll took five days.
- Constituency divided (1832)

== See also ==
- List of former United Kingdom Parliament constituencies
- Unreformed House of Commons
- Parliamentary representation from Cornwall
