= John Colshull =

John Colshull may refer to:

- John Colshull (MP died 1413), MP for Cornwall
- John Colshull (MP died 1418), MP for Cornwall
