= John Arundell (died 1435) =

Sheriff of Cornwall, Member of Parliament, Knight

John Arundell VI
- Sheriff of Cornwall
- Arms of the Arundell family
- Other titles: Captain of Marck, Vice-admiral of England under Thomas Beaufort, Duke of Exeter
- Other names: Sir John the Magnificent
- Born: circa 1366; Lanherne, St Mawgan in Pydar
- Died: 11 January 1435
- Buried: St Columb Major
- Residence: Lanherne House
- Wars and battles: •
- Noble family: Arundell of Lanherne
- Spouse: Annora Lambourn
- Issue: John Arundell (1392–1423)
- Parents: Sir John Arundell IV, Joan Luscote

Sir John Arundell VI (circa 1366 – 11 January 1435), called The Magnificent, of Lanherne in the parish of St Mawgan in Pydar in Cornwall, was an English knight who inherited large estates in the County of Cornwall. He was Sheriff of Cornwall and was one of Henry IV of England’s Kings Knights. In his will dated 1433, he bequeathed money for the preservation of the head of St Piran in the chapel at Perranzabuloe.

== Career ==
John Arundell was knighted in 1399 at the coronation of Henry IV of England. In February 1405, as ‘King’s knight’, Arundell was appointed as Captain of Marck, one of the Calais outposts, this included the castle and town with all lands, fisheries, franchises and perquisites outside the liberty of Calais were granted to him for life. He served in the navy 1418–19; married Annora Lambourn of Perranzabuloe, which brought to the Arundells several more Cornish manors. He was Sheriff of Cornwall four times and a member for the Cornwall 1422–23.

== Marriage and children ==
John Arundell married Annorah Lambourne, daughter of Sir William Lambourne.

- John Arundell (1392–1423) who married Margaret Burghersh in 1420 in Hertfordshire, the daughter of Sir John Burghersh and Ismarria Hanning (or Hanham)
- Sir Thomas Arundell (____ – 1443) who married 1. Elizabeth Powlet 2. Margery L'Arcedekne (____ – 1420)
- Renfrew Arundell (____ – 1442) who married Joan Colshull (1407–1497) dau of Sir John Colshull and Anne Challons
- Joan Arundell - became Abbess at Canonsleigh in Devon

== Death ==
Arundell made financial arrangements in his will that would maintain a chantry of five chaplains and a clerk at St Columb Major. The condition of this arrangement was that they would continue to pray for the souls of Arundell, and his kindred. He also left money to build a chapel in the parish church of St Columb Major to house his own tomb. He died on 11 January 1435 and his will was proved on 7 June. His will mentions his daughter Joan, his cousin Isabel Bevylle, his son Remfrey, and his son Thomas.

== See also ==
- Arundell family

Parliament of England
Preceded by Sir Henry Ilcombe; John Chenduyt	Member of Parliament for Cornwall; 1397–1398; With: John Colshull 1397; John Trevarthian 1397–1398	Succeeded by Sir William Lambourne; John Colshull
Preceded by Sir William Talbot; John Whalesborough	Member of Parliament for Cornwall; 1404–1406; With: John Chenduyt 1404; Sir Ralph Botreaux 1404–1406; Nicholas Broomford 1406	Succeeded by John Chenduyt; Richard Trevanion
Preceded by Sir Ralph Botreaux; Sir John Herle	Member of Parliament for Cornwall; 1411; With: John Urban	Unknown
Preceded by John Wybbury; John Trelawny II	Member of Parliament for Cornwall; 1414; With: John Colshull	Succeeded by Sir William Talbot; John Colshull
Unknown	Member of Parliament for Cornwall; 1416; With: William Bodrugan	Unknown
Unknown	Member of Parliament for Cornwall; 1417; With: Thomas Arundell	Succeeded by John Arundell; Sir Thomas Arundell
Preceded by Sir William Bodrugan; John Tretherf	Member of Parliament for Cornwall; 1421; With: Sir John Trelawny	Succeeded by Sir John Trelawny; John Arundell
Preceded by Sir John Trelawny; John Arundell	Member of Parliament for Cornwall; 1422–1424; With: John Arundell 1422	Unknown
Political offices
Preceded by Sir John Trevarthian	Undersheriff of Cornwall; 1402	Succeeded by William Bodrugan
Preceded by Sir Thomas Pomeroy	High Sheriff of Devon; 1414–1415	Succeeded by John Beville
Preceded by Henry Fulford	High Sheriff of Cornwall; 1418–1419	Succeeded by Stephen Derneford
