= Otto Bodrugan =

Member of the Parliament of England (1290–1331)

Sir Otto I Bodrugan (6 January 1290 – 6 September 1331), his name often written at the time as Otes, was an English landowner, soldier and politician from St Goran in Cornwall.

== Origins ==
From a leading Cornish family, with extensive lands and a long tradition of public service, he was the eldest son and heir of Sir Henry Bodrugan and his wife Sibyl Mandeville. Being born on 6 January 1290, he was underage when both his parents died and could not inherit his estates until he reached majority in 1311. These included the manors of Bodrugan in St Goran, Restronguet in Feock, Tremodret in Roche and Tregrehan in St Blazey, as well as the borough of Looe and six advowsons.

== Career ==
In 1321, he joined in the rebellion against the Despensers and was later pardoned for his part in the revolt. In 1324 he was chosen as a member of the Parliament of England for Cornwall, as his father had been in 1307.

He died on 6 September 1331, aged 41, and an inquisition post mortem was held on 10 October 1331.

== Family ==
Before 1311 he married Margaret, daughter of Sir William Champernowne (died 1305) and sister of Sir Henry Champernowne (died 1329), who married Otto's sister Joan Bodrugan. Otto and Margaret had three sons and a daughter:

- Joan (died 1349), who married John Whalesborough
- William (1311–1362), whose age had to be established before he inherited, had one daughter and heiress:
  - Elizabeth, who married as his first wife Sir Richard II Sergeaux (died 1393), later the father-in-law of Richard de Vere, 11th Earl of Oxford
- Otto II (died 1389), Sheriff of Cornwall in 1381, who had an illegitimate son and a legitimate daughter and heiress:
  - William I, who sat as MP for Cornwall.
  - Joan (died 1428), who married four husbands: (1) John Trevanion (died before 1380); (2) before 1380, Ralph Trenoweth, of Trenoweth (died 1393), MP for Truro, and had a son William II, who changed his name to Bodrugan and became an MP; (3) in 1393, John Trevarthian, of Trevarthian (died 1402), Sheriff and MP for Cornwall, and had a son Otto who married Elizabeth, daughter of Sir Warin Archdeacon; and (4) Sir Robert I Hill, of Shilston.
- Henry, who married Isabel Whalesborough

As none of his sons left legitimate male children, after much litigation his lands were eventually split between the heirs of William's daughter Elizabeth and those of Otto's daughter Joan.
