= Thomas Arundell (1454–1485) =

Thomas
- Sir
- Born: c. 1454
- Died: 1485; Lanherne, Cornwall
- Noble family: Arundell of Lanherne
- Spouse: Katherine Dynham
- Issue: Alice Arundell; Edward Arundell; Thomas Arundell; Roger Arundell; Humphrey Arundell; Elizabeth Arundell; Eleanor Arundell; Sir John Arundell (1474–1545)
- Father: Sir John Arundell of Lanherne, (1421-1473)
- Mother: Katherine Chideocke (1423-1479)

Sir Thomas Arundell (c. 1454–1485) was an English nobleman.

== Career ==
He was a son of Sir John Arundell of Lanherne (died 1473) and his second wife, Katherine (died 1479), a daughter of Sir John Chidiock.

Thomas Arundell was made a Knight of the Bath at the Coronation of Richard III of England in 1483. Two years later, when Richard III was defeated at the Battle of Bosworth (1485), he was attainted for rebelling against the King. Arundell then gave his support to Henry Tudor in his claim to the throne. His marriage to the heiress, Katherine Dynham, brought great wealth to the Arundell family. She was one of the four sisters and coheirs of John Dynham, 1st Baron Dynham.

== Marriage and issue ==
Thomas married Katherine Dynham in December 1473. She was the daughter of Sir John Dinham (1406–1458) and Jane de Arches. This marriage brought great possessions into the Arundell family.

- Eleanor Arundell (1472–1516), married Nicholas Saintlo (Nicholas St. Lowe) of Chewe
- Sir John Arundell (1474–1545) married Lady Eleanor Grey
- Elizabeth Arundell (1476–1513), married Sir Edward Stradling of St Donats, Glamorganshire, Wales.
- Alice Arundell (fl. 1478), married Sir John Speke of White Lackington
- Thomas Arundell (c. 1480 – c. 1513)
- Humphrey Arundell, married Phillipa or Philipa Grenville, daughter of Sir Thomas Grenville, Kt. (1454–1513) and first wife Isabel Gilbert
- Roger Arundell, married Johanna Calwoodleigh
- Edward Arundell

== Career ==
Sir Thomas, like his father, may also have fought on the Lancastrian side at the Battle of Tewkesbury, but was granted a pardon after paying heavy fines. He had a brief and troubled career. In the 1484 Parliament of Richard III, he was attainted and deprived of his estates, which were bestowed on his stepsister Anne's husband, Sir James Tyrell, the suspected murderer of the two young princes in the Tower. Anne was the only child of Sir John's first marriage to Elizabeth Morley, daughter of Thomas de Morley, 5th Baron Morley. Katherine, Thomas' wife was granted an annuity of £100 from the forfeited estates, originally belonging to the Dynham family. On the ascension of Henry VII, the attainder was reversed and the estates restored but the restitution was too late for Thomas who died 11 October 1485, just a few weeks after the Battle of Bosworth. In addition to the Cornish properties and other inherited from Sir John Chideock in Dorset, he held four manors in Devon.
