= Henry Bodrugan =

Member of the Parliament of England

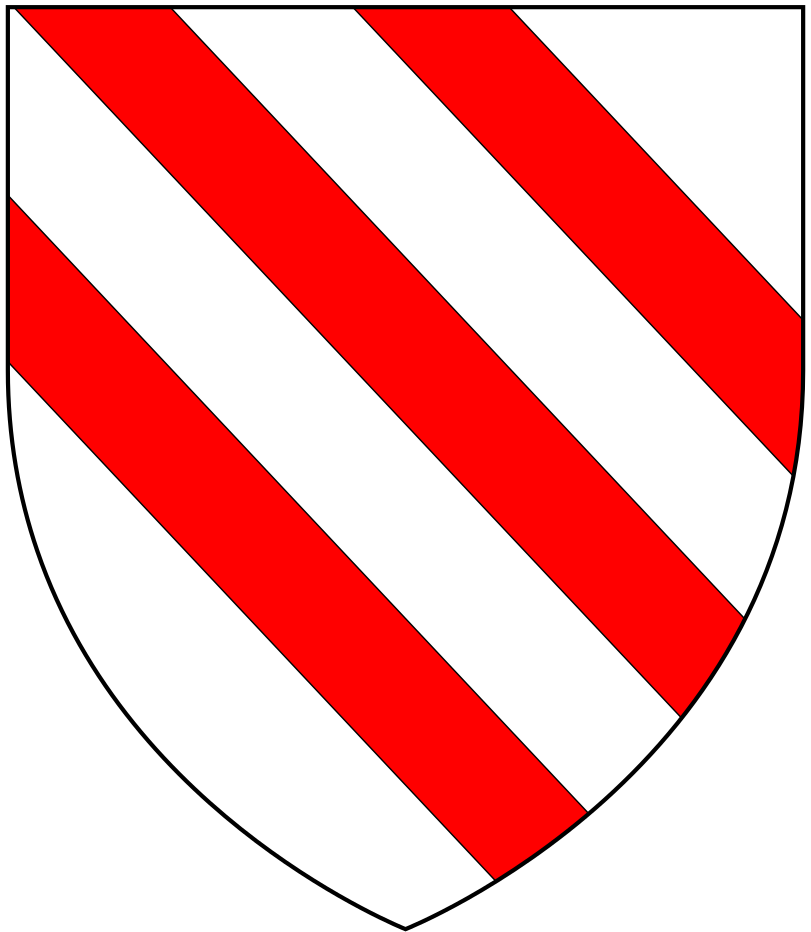
Arms of Bodrugan, Argent, three bendlets gules

Sir Henry de Bodrugan (c. 1263–1308) was a landowner, knight and politician from Cornwall.

== Family ==
Bodrugan was the son and heir of Sir Roger de Bodrugan (d. 1277) by Isolda de Pyn, (d. 1311), daughter of Symon de Pyn and later the wife of Sir Henry de Pomeroy (d. 1281), and Sir Walter de Aylesbury. Isolda's great uncle was the Seneschal and High Sheriff of Cornwall, Sir Stephen Haym, one of the founding canons of Glasney College.

When his father died Henry was still under aged and his wardship went to Sir William de Alneto. On 19 May 1277 Henry's wardship was purchased by his uncle, William Bodrugan, later Provost of Glasney, and Archdeacon of Cornwall. Henry became the heir of both his uncle, William, and his great uncle, Reginald.

In 1287 he married Sybil de Mandeville (29 September 1264–c. 1307) daughter of an unknown Mandeville and his wife Alice Giffard. Sybil's grandparents were Hugh Giffard and Sibyl, daughter and co-heiress of Walter de Cormeilles. From 1239 until his death in 1246 Hugh was responsible for raising the young prince, later King, Edward I. Sybil's maternal uncles were the Lord Chancellors of England, Walter Giffard, Archbishop of York, and Godfrey Giffard, Bishop of Worcester. Her aunt Mabel was the Abbess of Shaftesbury Abbey. Sybil was the widow of Peter le Poer (d. 4 April 1283), likely related to Eustace le Poer who, together with Thomas de Mandeville, brought an army from Ireland to Scotland to fight for Edward I of England. Sybil was lady of the Queen's chamber to Eleanor of Castile and her children were still with the Queen's children in 1289–90. She was buried in Glasney College and her son Sir Otto paid for the Bodrugan Chantry to be built there in his parents' honour.

Henry and Sybil had two children:

- Otto, married Margaret Champernowne (d. 1360).
- Joan (b. 1285), married Sir Henry Champernowne.

These children and their spouses feature heavily in the novel The House on the Strand by Daphne du Maurier.

== Landowner ==
His principal residence appears to have been at Bodrugan, near Goran, with others at Pendrym and Tregrehan. At his death he owned the manors of Bodrugan, Pendrym, Trethem, Tretheak, Treworrick, Tremodret, Trevellion, Tregrehan, Trethew and Lantyan Parva. The large manor of Restronguet was held by his mother, who did not die until 1311. Henry had already given away the manor of Trelawne to his daughter on her marriage. The manor of Markwell, which belonged to his uncle William, was given to William's illegitimate daughter, but eventually returned to Henry's son Otto. In addition to these manors he held other lands and tenements across Cornwall.

He held some property in Ireland through his wife who was named heir to her brother Walter in 1288. The Mandevilles were important sub-tenants of the earldom of Ulster and, between 1300 and 1304, Edward I issued numerous letters of nomination for Henry's attorneys in Ireland (his brothers John and Peter, and John le Fugheler). In 1305 John le Poer, baron of Doneyl in Waterford, and Sibyl's son by her first marriage, was found owing Henry £200. The sheriff of Waterford was commanded by the king to levy £50 of the lands and chattels of John le Poer of the £200. Through her brother he also came to hold 1/6 of the manor of Luton, Bedfordshire which Walter had exchanged for portions of the manors of Eltham, Woolwich and Mottingham. When Sybil died these Mandeville estates passed to her son by her first marriage.

== Political career ==
He was a Member (MP) of the Parliament of England for Cornwall in 1307. In 1284 he was one of the Justices of Assize for Cornwall, and in 1302 he was a juror at the assizes. In 1309, months after his death, he was summoned to parliament as a baron. As he could not sit in that parliament his descendants were unable to claim the title of baron.

== Military career ==
In 1286 Henry joined Edward I on an expedition to Gascony. In April he was given permission to go "beyond the seas" for one year with Robert Burnell, Bishop of Bath and Wells, Edmund Crouchback and others. After sailing to northern France in mid-May they reached Gascony by August. Henry was knighted by 1289, perhaps as a result of his participation in the expedition. As there is no record of him serving in Wales, he was probably part of the 1294 expedition to Gascony with John of Brittany and William Latymer. From 1300 Henry became involved in Edward's Scottish wars, his coat of arms is features as No. 227 in the Galloway Roll. In September 1302 the king issued a pardon to Henry's retinue, his younger brothers Peter and John, Adam de Markwell (married to Henry's uncle's illegitimate daughter), Serlo Wyse and John le Fugheler for crimes they had committed "in consideration of their service in Gascony and Scotland". The crimes were the retaliatory measures the men had taken after Henry was attacked by Thomas Lercedekne and Ralph de Bloyou at the house of William Bloyou at Glasney.
