= John Arundell (died 1473) =

Canting arms of Arundell: Sable, six martlets argent (hirondelle (French), martlet)

Sir John Arundell VII (1421–1473) of Lanherne in the parish of St Mawgan in Pydar, Cornwall, was Sheriff of Cornwall and Admiral of Cornwall, and served as a general for King Henry VI in his French wars. He became the largest free tenant in Cornwall.

== Origins ==
He was born in Bideford in Devon in about 1421, the son and heir of Sir John Arundell (1392–1423) of Lanherne by his wife Margaret Burghersh, widow of Sir John Grenville, lord of the manor of Bideford, and a daughter of Sir John Burghersh. The Arundell family was long established at Lanherne.

== Career ==
He was knighted by King Edward IV in 1465 and fought at the Battle of Tewkesbury in 1471.

== Marriage and issue ==
He married twice:

- Firstly to Elizabeth de Morley, a daughter of Thomas de Morley, 5th Baron Morley, by whom he had one child:
  - Anne Arundell, who married Sir James Tyrrell, best known for allegedly confessing to the murders of the Princes in the Tower under the orders of King Richard III of England.
- Secondly, on 5 March 1451, he married Katherine Chideocke or Chiddiock (d. 1479), the widow of William Stafford. They had eight children:
  - Sir Thomas Arundell (1454–1485), son and heir, who took part in the Duke of Buckingham's rebellion against Richard III.
  - Katherine Arundell
  - Elizabeth Arundell, who married Giles Daubeney, 1st Baron Daubeney;
  - Thomasine Arundell, who married Henry Marney, 1st Baron Marney, KG, of Leyre-Marney;
  - Margaret Arundell (d. 1522), who married Sir William Capel (c.1446–1515), Lord Mayor of London.
  - Ellen Arundell
  - Dorothy Arundell
  - Jane Arundell

After the death of John Arundell in 1473, Katherine married Sir Roger Lewkenor (d. 1478).

== Death ==
John Arundell died in November 1473 at his seat of Lanherne in Cornwall.

== Ancestry ==
Ancestors of John Arundell (died 1473)

Sir John Arundell
John Arundel V
Elizabeth Carminow
John Arundell of Lanherne
Sir William Luscot
Joan Luscote
?
John Arundell VI
William Lambourne
Sir William Lambourne
Joanna Lansladrou
Annorah Lambourne
Ralph le Soor
Joan le Soor
?
John Arundell VII (1421 - 1473)
Robert de Burghersh (d. 1306), Lord Warden of the Cinque Ports
John de Burghersh
?
Sir John de Burghersh of Ewelme, Oxon
Edmund Bacon
Maud Bacon
Joan de Braose
Margaret Burghersh
Jamania / Ismania de Hanham

== See also ==
- Arundell family
