= John Archdeacon =

English parliamentarian of the late 14th century; of Ruan Lanihorne, Cornwall

John Archdeacon was an English politician who was MP for an unidentified constituency. He was the son of Thomas Archdeacon, and two of his sons were Michael Archdeacon and Warin Archdeacon.
