= Thomas Pridias =

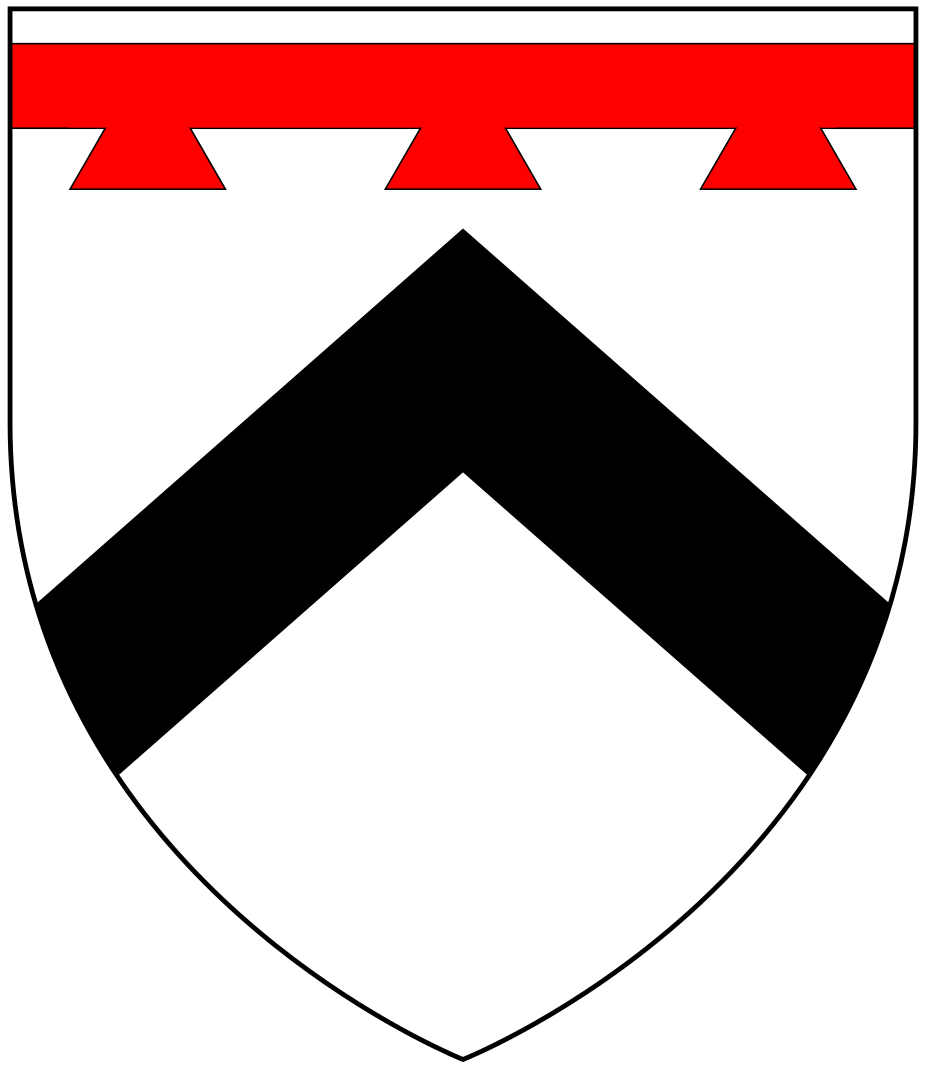
Arms of Prideaux: Argent, a chevron sable in chief a label of three points gules

Sir Thomas Pridias (died 1310 or 1311) (alias Prideaux) lord of the manor of Newham (anciently Nunneam, etc.) in the parishes of Kenwyn and Kea, immediately south of the parish of Truro, in Cornwall, was a Member of Parliament for Cornwall in 1298.

== Origins ==
He was the son and heir of Sir Reginald Pridias (fl. 1262) lord of the manor of Newham (anciently Nunneam, etc.) in Truro, probably a younger son of Richard Pridias (d.1250) of Prideaux Castle, near Fowey, in Cornwall, lord of the manor of Prideaux. The Prideaux family is believed to be of Norman origin and to have first settled in England at some time after the Norman Conquest of 1066 at Prideaux Castle. Sir Thomas Pridias's ancestors had obtained a moiety of the manor and borough of Truro at some time before 1175, the supposed date of a charter granted by Reginald de Pridias to the town of Truro. Sir Reginald Pridias (fl. 1262) of Newham was party to a deed dated 1262 summarised as follows:

to settle certain disputes between the lords and burgesses of Treuru (Truro) and Reginald de Pridias, lord of Nunneam, in which he consents that his men of the chase at Nunneam should be talliaged with the men of Trueru and pay toll there

The Prideaux family later abandoned their seat at Prideaux and moved to Devon, where it spread out in various branches, earliest at Orcheton, Modbury, inherited by the marriage of Sir Thomas Pridias's uncle Geoffry Pridias to the heiress Isabella de Orcharton. Later branches were seated at Adeston, Holbeton; Thuborough, Sutcombe; Soldon, Holsworthy; Netherton, Farway (see Prideaux baronets); Ashburton; Nutwell, Woodbury and Ford Abbey, Thorncombe and at Prideaux Place in the parish of Padstow, Cornwall, where the Prideaux-Brune family still resides today. It was one of the most widespread and successful of all the gentry families of Devon, and as remarked upon by Swete (d.1821), exceptionally most of the expansion was performed by younger sons, who by the custom of primogeniture were expected to make their own fortunes.

== Career ==
He was a Member of Parliament for Cornwall in 1298 and was a Collector of the Subsidy in 1298. In 1297 he is recorded as holding lands to the annual value of £20. Thomas de Pridias, in 1294, was summoned from the County of Cornwall to perform military service against the Welsh, and, in the same year, he was appointed one of the Assessors and Collectors of the subsidy for the county, as he was again in 1309. In 1297, as Sir Thomas Pridias, he was returned from Cornwall as holding lands or rents of the value of £20 a year or upwards, and as such was summoned under the general writ to perform military service, with horses and arms, beyond the seas.' In the following year he was returned as Knight for the shire of Cornwall at the Parliament held at York, and in 1301 he was summoned from Cornwall to perform military service in person against the Scots.

== Landholdings ==
=== Newham ===
The manor of Newham was situated in the parishes of Kenwyn and Kea, situated south of the former Church of St Mary, now Truro Cathedral. The estate was sold by Lord Vivian in the 1920s. Today it is represented by Higher Newham Farm, 92 acres of which in 2014 were scheduled to be built on to provide 155 dwelling houses

=== Truro ===
John de Ripariis (de Rivers) granted, under the designation of Thomas son of Reginald de Prydyas, Knt., one messuage and one garden in Trurue Marche, with the advowson of the Church of the Blessed Mary of Trurue appertaining to the same garden and house, and one place of land called the Castle, together with the moiety of the free Borough of Trurue Marche with fairs, markets, tolls, stallages, riverage, sac and soc, toll and them, infangenethef, utfangenethef, with all the liberties to the said borough pertaining, &c., &c., and the services of Thomas Davy for the moiety of the mill which he holds of him in Trureu, to hold to the said Thomas de Pridyas his heirs and assigns of him the said John de Ripariis and his heirs and assigns for ever of the King in capite by the accustomed services.

== Marriage, children and death ==
He married a certain Rose, of unrecorded family origins, who in 1345 exercised patronage of the advowson of St Mary's Church in Truro, Cornwall (demolished in the 1500s, now Truro Cathedral). By his wife he had children including his son and heir, Geoffry de Pridias (1274 – before 1347).

On Thomas's death in 1310 or 1311, he held, amongst others, a part of the Borough of Truro and the manor of Nywenen (Newnham).

== Sources ==
- Vivian, Lt.Col. J. L., (Ed.) The Visitations of the County of Devon: Comprising the Heralds' Visitations of 1531, 1564 & 1620, Exeter, 1895, p. 616, pedigree of Prideaux of Prideaux
- Maclean, Sir John, Parochial and Family History of the Deanery of Trigg Minor, in the County of Cornwall, Vol.2, London, 1876.
