= Hester Parnall =

English brewer and businesswoman (1868–1939)

- Born: 1868; St Austell, Cornwall, England
- Died: 1939 (aged 70–71); Fowey, Cornwall, England
- Occupation(s): Businesswoman and brewer
- Years active: 1911–1939
- Known for: Chair of St Austell Brewery

Hester Parnall (née Hicks, 1868–1939) was an English businesswoman and brewer who was director and chair of St Austell Brewery.

== Biography ==
Hester Parnall was born in St Austell, Cornwall, England, in 1868. She married Thomas Rogers Parnall in 1904, a widower 28 years her senior. She was widowed in 1915.

St Austell Brewery was founded in 1851 by Parnall's father, Walter Hicks, at St Austell. In 1911, Hester's brother Walter Junior died after a motorcycle accident at Helston, Cornwall, and Walter returned to run the brewery aged 82. Another brother, Gerald, died at Flanders during World War I in 1915. Parnall joined St Austell Brewery as a director in 1911 and became company chairman after her father's death in 1916. She remained in this position until her 1939. She was succeeded by her nephew Egbert Barnes (1898–1979).

Under her leadership, St Austell Brewery expanded, horse-drawn wagons were replaced with steam-powered ones and by the 1920s production had doubled in comparison to before the war. The brewery output was 38,000 barrels per annum, equating to 9.5m pints of beer. Parnall also grew the company's hospitality holdings, purchasing over 75 pubs and hotels, including The Yacht Inn in Penzance, The Crown Inn in St Ewe and The White Hart Hotel in St Austell. In 1934, she acquired Christopher Ellis and Son’s steam brewery in Hayle, Cornwall, along with the estate of 30 pubs. A room at Pedn Olva in St Ives is named "Hester's" in her honour.

Parnall was a "matriarchal figure" and was feared by her employees. The first person to see her chauffeur-driven Daimler car pulling into the brewery would bang on the water pipes to warn that she was arriving. In 1963, she was described by Clifford Hockin, then the brewery’s company secretary as "ruling the Company with the grace of a duchess combined with the aplomb of a successful business man".

Parnall travelled everywhere with her Pekinese dogs and was a supporter of the Conservative Party. In 1926, she became the tenant of the country house Tregrehan House near St Austell. She invited Edward, Prince of Wales, Wallis Simpson, and Prime Minister Stanley Baldwin to Tregrehan. In 1931, Parnall acquired Point Neptune villa at auction and she modernised and redecorated the house between 1936 and 1939. Parnall died in 1939 in Fowey, Cornwall.
