= John Colshull (MP died 1418) =

Member of the Parliament of England

Sir John Colshull (c. 1391 – 5 July 1418), of Tremodret in Duloe and Binnamy in Week St. Mary, Cornwall was an English Member of Parliament for Cornwall in April and November 1414. He was the son of John Colshull, who was also a Member of Parliament.
