= Tregrehan House =

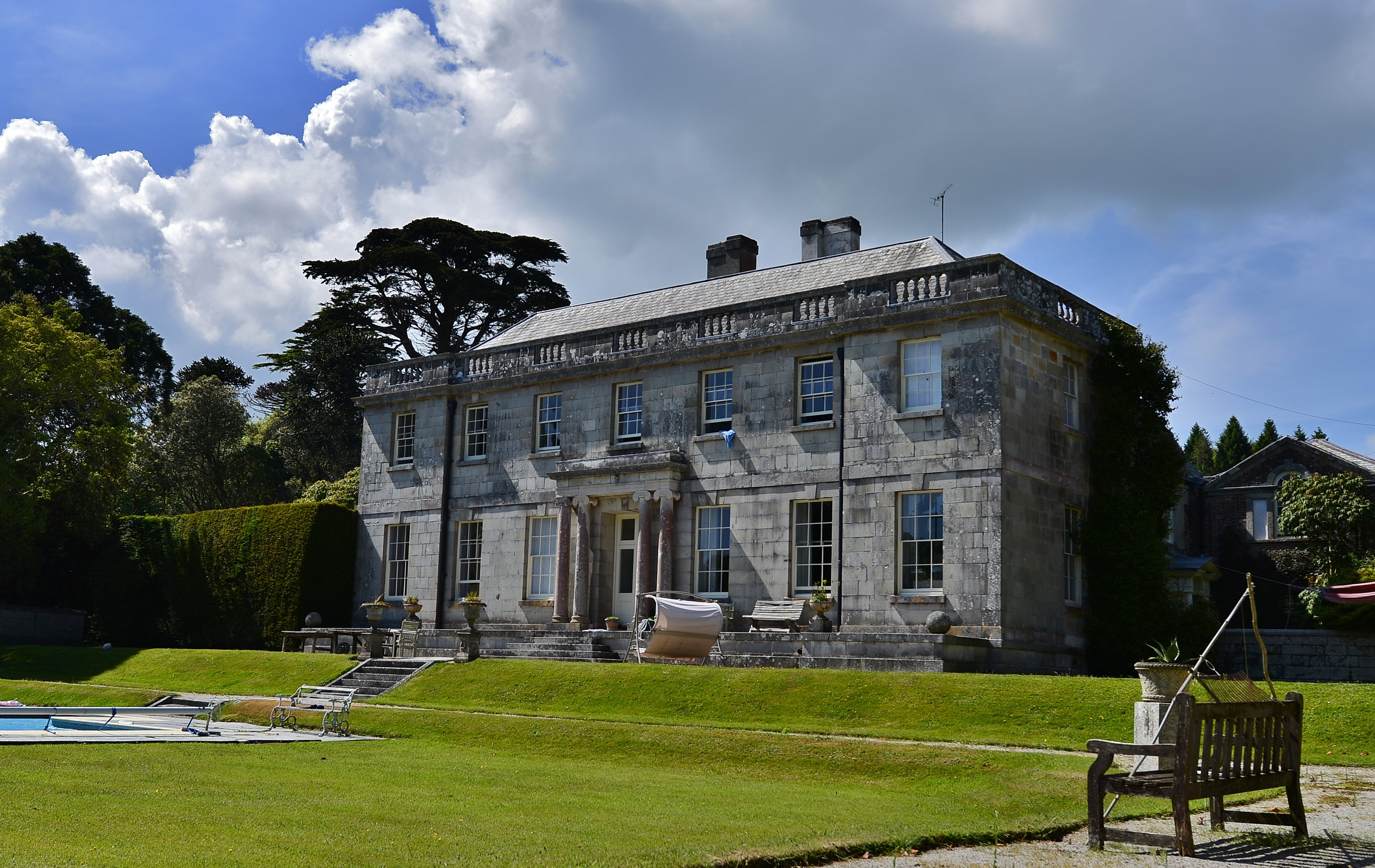
Tregrehan House photographed in 2016

Tregrehan is a country house near St. Blazey, Cornwall, designed by George Wightwick. It is described by Nikolaus Pevsner as "Late Georgian ... granite ... Ionic colonnade", [also] "a pretty little lodge".

Tregrehan has been home of the Carlyon family since 1565. During the Middle Ages it was one of the residences of the Bodrugan family.

The gardens are listed as nationally outstanding (grade II*). The spring garden has been restored by the new owner since 1989. Much of the 20 acres is planted as woodland. There is an 18th-century wooded driveway.

In 1926, brewer Hester Parnall took over the tenancy of Tregrehan and invited Edward, Prince of Wales, Wallis Simpson, and Prime Minister Stanley Baldwin to stay at her residence.

The grounds are used for an annual speed hill climb.

== Cornish wrestling ==
Cornish wrestling tournaments took place at the bottom of the grounds on the left hand side of the lower entrance drive at the start of the 1900s.
