= Michael Archdeacon =

Member of the Parliament of England

Michael Archdeacon, of Combehall in Drewsteignton, Devon was an English politician who was MP for Cornwall in February 1383 and November 1390. He was the son of John Archdeacon, in turn a son of Thomas Archdeacon, and a younger brother of Warin Archdeacon.
