= Gerry Cawley =

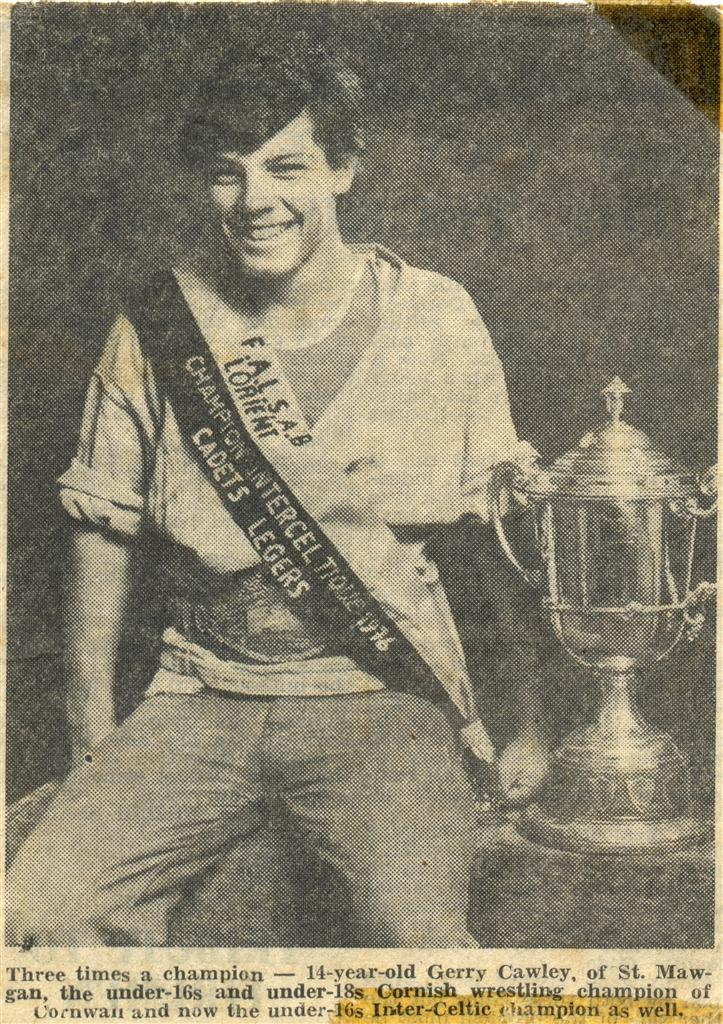
"Three times a champion - 14 year-old Gerry Cawley of St Mawgan, the under-16s and under-18s Cornish Wrestling Champion of Cornwall and now the under-16s Interceltic Champion as well"

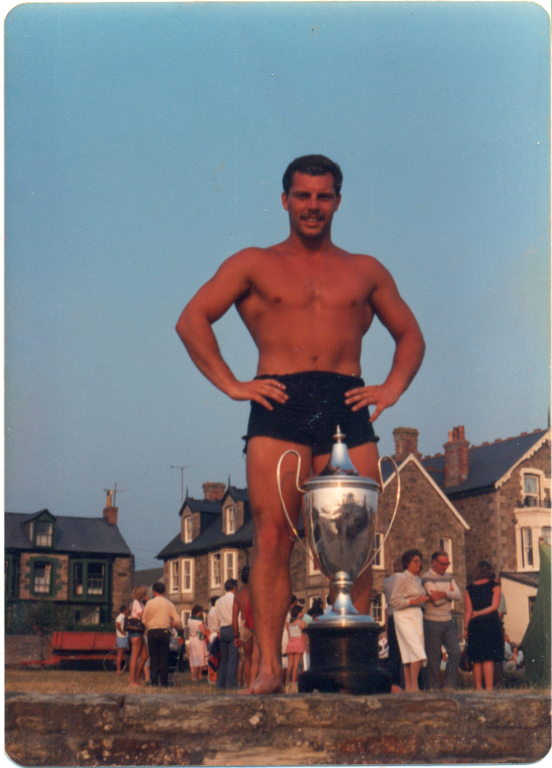
Champion of Cornwall, at Perranporth

Gerry Cawley originally from St Mawgan in Cornwall is well known for being a Cornish Wrestling Champion. Gerry Cawley retired from competitive wrestling although can still be found acting as a stickler (referee) in the Cornish Wrestling ring.

In 2007, Cawley won the Cornish Heavyweight Wrestling Championship at Helston, as part of the Harvest Fair festivities. The event took place in front of a crowd of over 200 people, defeating Gareth Beale of Truro following 2 x 10 minute bouts plus 3 minutes extra time.
