= Thomas Archdeacon (senior) =

Member of the Parliament of England

Thomas Archdeacon was an English politician who was MP for an unidentified constituency. He was the father of John Archdeacon, and the grandfather of Michael Archdeacon and Warin Archdeacon.
