= Henry Sewell Stokes =

Cornish poet

Henry Sewell Stokes (1808–1895) was a Cornish poet. The Cornish poet was a schoolfellow of Charles Dickens; later literary friends included Tennyson and Robert Stephen Hawker. His great nephew, Sewell Stokes, was a novelist, biographer and playwright.

== Works ==
- Lines in Memory of Thomas Simon Bolitho. [Bodmin]: Privately printed, 1887.
- The Chantry Owl. London: Longmans, 1881.
- The Gate of Heaven, The Plaint of Morwenstow and Other Verses. Bodmin: Liddell & Son, 1876.
- Echoes of the War and Other Poems. Truro: Heard and Sons, 1855. Includes The Alliance, The Parting, The Expedition, The Battle of Alma, The Marshall's Death, After the Battle, The Dirge, The Siege, Balaklava, The Nurses, Who are the Brave, Inkerman, Widows and Orphans, A Lament for Eliot, Christmas Night.
- The Vale of Lanherne and Other Poems; illustrated by James George Philp. London: Longman, Brown, Green, and Longmans, 1853.
- The Lay of the Desert. London: Hurst, Chance, 1830.
- The Song of Albion. London: Cochrane, 1831.
- A Lament from Cornwall on the Death of Princess Alice. Bodmin: Liddell and Son, 1878
- Rhymes from Cornwall. London: J. C. Hotten, 1871
- Restormel: a legend of Piers Gaveston; The Patriot Priest, and other verses. London: Longmans, Green, and Co., 1875
