= Otto Bodrugan (d. 1389) =

Member of the Parliament of England

Otto Bodrugan, of Bodrugan, Cornwall, was an English politician who was MP for Cornwall in the Parliament of April 1384. He was the son of Otto Bodrugan, and his illegitimate son was William Bodrugan (fl. 1384–1401).
