= Warin Archdeacon =

Member of the Parliament of England

Warin Archdeacon was an English politician who was MP for Cornwall in 1380 and 1382. He was the son of John Archdeacon, in turn a son of Thomas Archdeacon, and an elder brother of Michael Archdeacon.
