= Sir John Arundell IV =

English knight in Cornwall

- Arms of the Arundell family
- Born: c. 1340; Treleigh Manor, St Ervan, Cornwall, England
- Died: 5 November 1376; Ireland
- Noble family: Arundell of Lanherne
- Spouse: Joan Luscote
- Issue: Sir John Arundell V
- Father: John Arundell III

Sir John Arundell IV, born at Treleigh Manor, in the parish of St Ervan, Cornwall in about 1340 was an English knight and as son of John Arundell (III) was heir to a family that held large amounts of land in Devon and Cornwall. He died on 5 November 1376, drowned off the coast of Ireland, in a fleet going to Brittany.

== Marriage and issue ==
Sir John Arundell IV married Joan Luscote, the daughter of Sir William Luscote, in about 1370.

His wife survived him and married, as her second husband, widower Sir William Lambourne. John and Joan's son and heir, Sir John Arundell (V), married Annora Lambourne, his step-father's daughter by a previous wife.
