= Thomas Arundell (MP died 1443) =

Member of the Parliament of England

Member of Parliament for Cornwall
- In office 1417–1435

Personal details
- Died: 1433
- Parent: John Arundell (The Magnificent)
- Occupation: Politician, Justice of the Peace

Thomas Arundell (died 1433) was an English politician who was MP for Cornwall in 1417, 1419, 1429, and 1435 and High Sheriff of Cornwall 1422–1423, 1426–1427, 1432–1433 and Devon 1437–1438. He was the son of John Arundell (1366–1435), The Magnificent, of Lanherne, Cornwall. He was also a justice of the peace in the county.
