= John Arundell (died 1423) =

English knight and Sheriff of Cornwall

Sir John Arundell VII
- Sheriff of Cornwall
- Arms of the Arundell family
- Other names: Sir John of Bideford
- Born: 1392; Bideford, England
- Died: December 5, 1423 (aged 30–31); England
- Noble family: Arundell of Lanherne
- Spouse: Margaret Burghersh
- Issue: John Arundell (1421–1473)
- Parents: John Arundell (1366–1435) and Annorah Lambourne

Sir John Arundell VII of Bideford (1392–1423), was an English knight who inherited large estates in Cornwall from his father, John Arundell of Lanherne. He was Sheriff of Cornwall, as was his father before him.

== Career ==
He was appointed by Henry of Monmouth, Prince of Wales, as Sheriff of Cornwall in 1412, was Member of Parliament for Devon in 1414, and for Cornwall in 1419–1421

== Marriage and issue ==
He married Margaret Burghersh (c. 1376 – c. 1421), the widow of Sir John Grenville, in 1417. Burghersh was the daughter and coheir of Sir John Burghersh of Ewelme, Oxon

- John Arundell VIII (1421–1473) married, 1 Elizabeth Morley and 2 Katherine Chideocke.

== See also ==
- Arundell family
