= Glasney College =

Religious centre in medieval Cornwall

Coordinates: 50.1662°N 5.10193°W

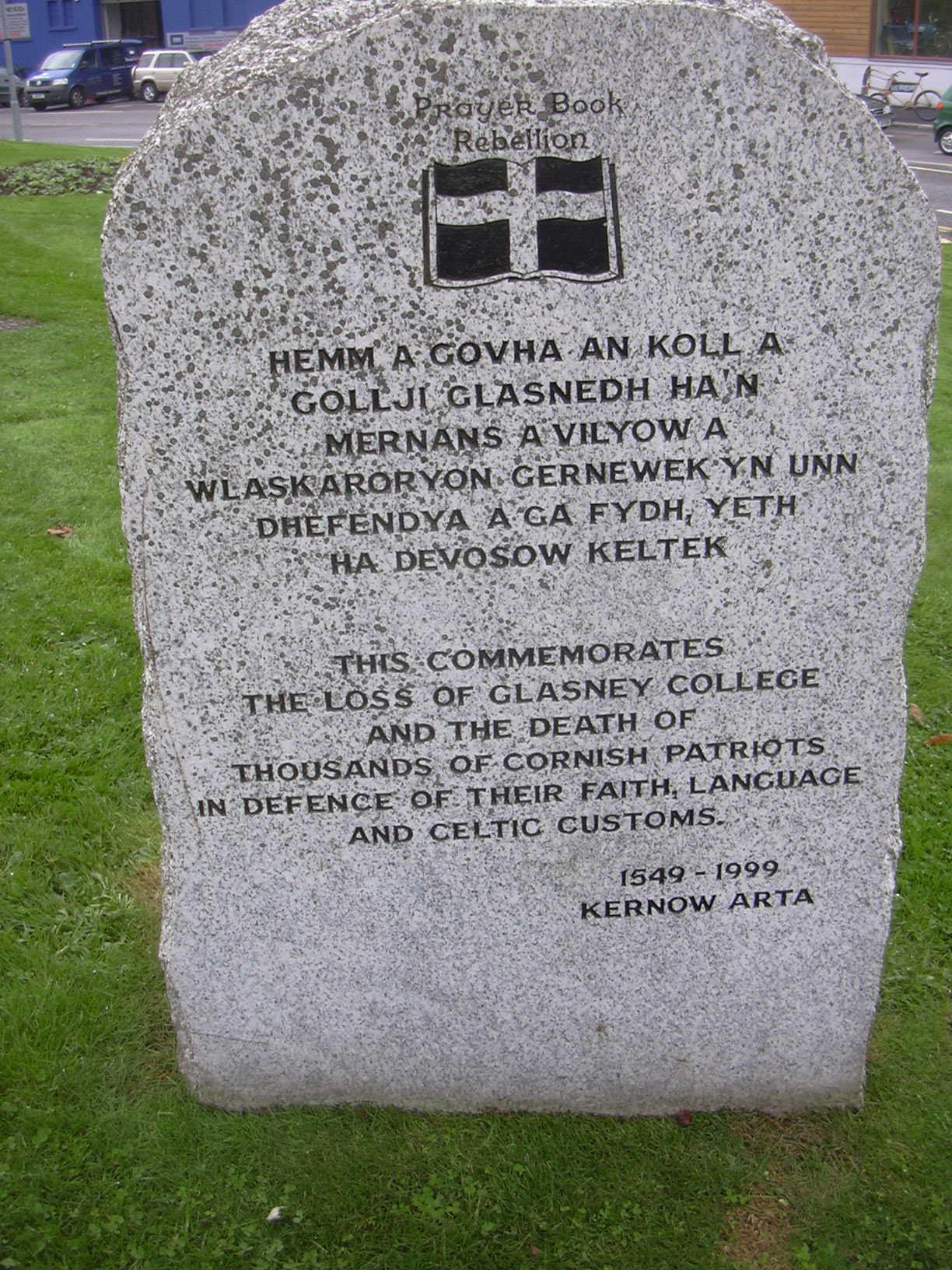
Prayer Book Rebellion Memorial, near the site of Glasney College, where it was destroyed by Henry VIII. Penryn

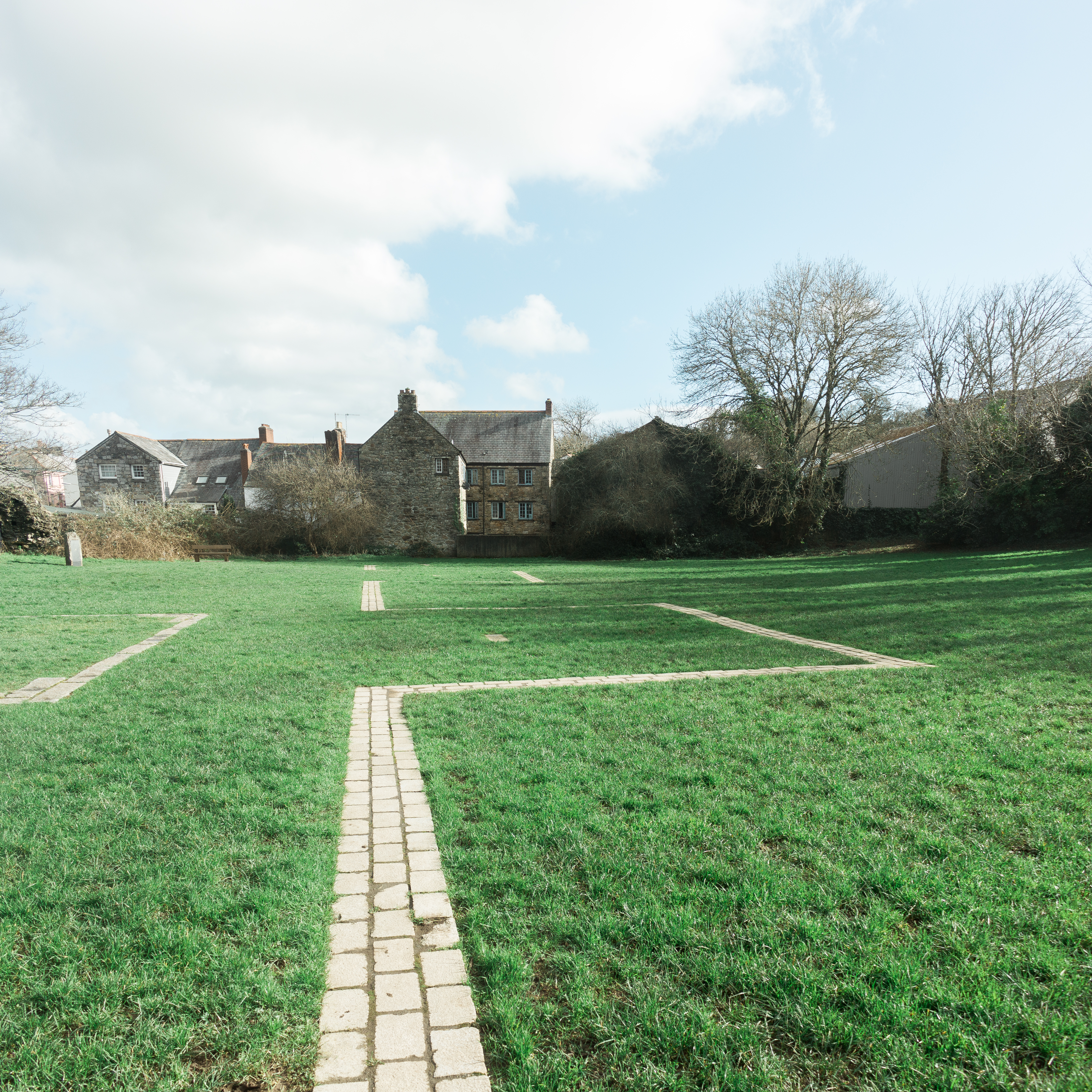
Glasney College Field, site of the original building, where brick paths have been placed to show the locations of the original walls.

Glasney College (Cornish: Kolji Glasnedh) was a centre of ecclesiastical learning in medieval Cornwall and probably the best known and most important of Cornwall's religious institutions. Significant in Cornish culture because of its links with Cornish language and literature, it was founded in 1265 at Penryn, Cornwall by Bishop Bronescombe of Exeter, and it was dissolved in 1548.

== History ==
While he was staying at Canterbury, Bishop Bronescombe became ill and experienced a dream in which Saint Thomas Becket told him to establish a college at Penryn in the name of the saint. Bronescombe founded Glasney College in 1265 in the woods near Penryn as the western outpost of the Diocese of Exeter, which then included the whole of Cornwall. The college included canons' houses and gardens, a deer park and palace for the Bishop of Exeter, a lay church, a courtyard, and a refectory and chapter house. The total area of the site was around 4 1/4 acres (1.7 hectares) and it was surrounded by a defensive wall. Construction took place during the late fourteenth and early fifteenth centuries. The chapel, which functioned as the collegiate church, was dedicated to Becket. Some of the limestone used for the decoration of the buildings was brought by sea from Beer Quarry Caves in Devon.

The site at Glasney was at the head of a small creek. Much of the building was modelled on Exeter Cathedral, and as a defence Bishop Bronescombe built three towers, forming one block that acted as a defence both for the college and for the town of Penryn.

Glasney College had a constitution that was based on the chapter of Exeter Cathedral. It held the patronage of sixteen parishes. There were no monks at the college or its collegiate church, but it had an establishment of one provost and thirteen secular canons who were members of an Augustinian order. William Bodrugan was the first official Provost of Glasney, from 17 April 1283 to 1288, before he became Archdeacon of Cornwall.

During the later Middle Ages, Glasney was the largest clerical body in Cornwall, as large as any of the ancient monasteries had been, and with an equivalent income, mainly derived from the rectorial tithes of Budock, Colan, Feock, Kea, Manaccan, Mevagissey, Mylor, St Allen, St Enoder, St Gluvias, St Goran, St Just in Penwith, Sithney, and Zennor..

For nearly three centuries, Glasney functioned as an ecclesiastical and cultural centre for Cornwall, sustaining the Cornish identity and language. The college gained a reputation as a centre for Cornish literature and plays, and undertook the documentation of many of the Cornish mystery plays that were written in the Cornish language. These plays would have been performed in outdoor performance spaces known as plenis an gwary across Cornwall. Few medieval Cornish-language plays survive today, but two examples that were composed at Galsney are the Ordinalia and Bewnans Meriasek, the Life of Saint Meriasek, patron saint of Camborne.

== Destruction of Glasney ==
The college's canons had difficulty in affording the upkeep of the buildings. In 1500 Sir Thomas Killegrew gave 100 marks towards re-building work, but by 1542 the college was in a state of neglect and it was dissolved in 1548 during the reign of Edward VI. It was closed down under the Chantries Act 1547 along with most English colleges. As a chantry church it had survived Henry VIII's initial dissolution of the monasteries, between 1536 and 1545 which brought to an end the big Cornish priories.

At the time of Glasney College's dissolution, the Royal Commissioners suggested that it should be converted into a grammar school, but this suggestion was not acted upon. Instead the stone from the college buildings was removed and used to construct Pendennis Castle. The dissolution was followed by the imposition of further changes to popular religious practice in Cornwall which were intended to destroy all the symbols of Cornish Roman Catholicism. The celebration of the feast days of the Saints, a popular activity in Cornwall, was banned, along with pilgrimages to sacred sites such as St Michael's Mount. In 1547–1548, government agents removed religious images from parish churches. These reforms were overseen by the Archdeacon of Cornwall, William Body, who was killed in 1548 by a mob in Helston for what they saw as sacrilege. The riot in Heston was punished with 28 arrests and ten executions. The Act of Uniformity 1548, abolishing the Latin Mass and replacing it with the English-language Book of Common Prayer, ultimately led to the Prayer Book Rebellion of 1549.

Apart from being sorely missed centres of indigenous cultural excellence, many in Cornwall saw these institutions as bridges to the Celtic past, back even to the Christianised Celtic paganism of their forefathers.

== Legacy ==
Hardly any remains exist on the site, which was neglected for centuries after most of the fabric of the buildings was removed. Only a single section of stonework now survives above ground, in the east wall of a chantry chapel. In 1987 the Friends of Glasney College was formed by Dr James Whetter to increase awareness of the college's location and importance. In his book The History of Glasney College, Whetter describes the destruction of Glasney as a damaging blow to the history and spirit of the Cornish nation.

=== Memorial ===
At the present-day Penryn Campus of Falmouth University and the University of Exeter, the student accommodation has been named Glasney Student Village, which is split into two areas, Glasney View and Glasney Parc. The memorial site at Glasney Parc contains flowerbeds and herbs commonly used during the medieval period.
