= William Bodrugan (senior) =

William Bodrugan (died 1362) was an English politician who was MP for Cornwall. He was the uncle of William Bodrugan.
