= Henry Ilcombe =

English politician

Sir Henry Ilcombe was an English politician. He sat as MP for Cornwall in February 1388, 1395 and Lostwithiel in 1402 and 1407.

In 1372, he served in William Montague, Earl of Salisbury's retinue on the failed La Rochelle expedition and mutinied with his two brothers, Baldwin and William.

== Offices held ==
He also served as coroner of Cornwall by September 1394 till 10 December 1395 and escheator of Cornwall from 18 November 1395 till 26 November 1399.

He also served as commissioner of inquiry in Cornwall in May 1388 and July 1397 concerning acquisition of land by aliens, in December 1395 concerning shipwrecks, commissioner of array in March 1392 and commissioner to bring a royal ward to Chancery in December 1395.

== Family ==
By 1387, he was married to Isabel, the widow of John Moun. He was knighted c. 1382.
