= John Colshull (MP died 1413) =

Member of the Parliament of England

John Colshull (died 1413), of Friday Street, London, was an English Member of Parliament for Cornwall in 1391, 1394, January 1397 and 1399. He was also common councillor in Vintry, twice sheriff of Cornwall, a justice of the peace in Cornwall, steward of the duchy estates in Cornwall, and deputy butler at London and Sandwich. He was the father of John, who died in 1418.
