= William Bodrugan (priest) =

Cornish priest and landowner

William de Bodrugan (c. 1250-1307), sometimes referred to as a knight, was a Cornish priest and landowner, who became firstly Provost of Glasney College, and secondly Archdeacon of Cornwall.

== Family ==
William was the second son of Philip de Bodrugan and his wife Rosea, or Roslyn, perhaps the daughter of Luke de Hendresuk of Talland. His elder brother, Roger, died in 1277, leaving his son, Henry Bodrugan, heir to the family's estates, under aged. William purchased Henry's wardship from Sir William de Alneto on 19 May 1277, thereby recovering control of the family's property.

William is known to have fathered one illegitimate child, Elizabeth, and possibly two more, Felicia and Philip.

- Elizabeth, married to Adam de Markwell.
- Felicia, married Andrew de Trevelyan in 1309.
- Philip, son of William de Bodrugan (mentioned in 1311).

== Career ==
In 1274 William became rector of the family benefice of St Martin by Looe. As guardian for his nephew, William had control over the family benefices, so he was able in 1277 to appoint the new rector of Poundstock. In July 1278 he succeeded to the canonry of Master William de Sancto Justo at Glasney College. On 6 November 1282 he was collated to the rectory of Ruan Lanihorne. On 22 March 1283 William gave up St Martin by Looe, appointing a new rector in his place, but in August 1285 he returned as coadjutor to Sir Walter de Tremur who had fallen ill. William became the first official Provost of Glasney on 17 April 1283. On 28 February 1288 he relinquished the provostship. He was Archdeacon of Cornwall from 1295 to 1307.

== Landowner ==
During William's life, particularly in his later years, he engaged himself in expanding his landed estate, eventually acquiring the manors of Tremodret (Roche), Trethew (Liskeard), and Markwell (St Erney). These lands would eventually pass to his nephew, Henry, apart from Markwell which was given by William to Adam de Markwell for his lifetime as part of Elizabeth's dowry. On Adam's death the manor passed back to Henry's son, Otto.
