= William Bodrugan (died 1416) =

Member of the Parliament of England

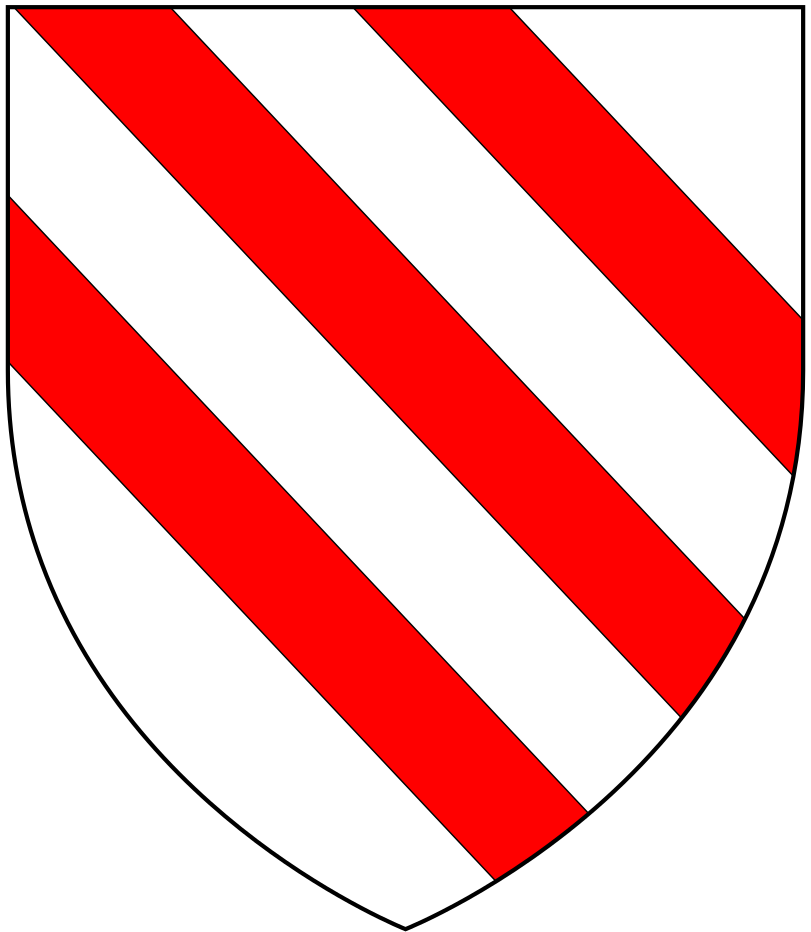
Arms of Bodrugan, Argent, three bendlets gules

William Bodrugan (died 1416) was an English politician from Cornwall, the nephew of politician William Bodrugan (MP fl. 1384–1401).

He was a Member (MP) of the Parliament of England for Liskeard in November 1414 and for Cornwall in March 1416. He was also justice of the peace of the latter county.

His son was the MP William Bodrugan, who represented Cornwall in 1420–1433.
