= St Mawgan =

Village and civil parish in Cornwall, England

St Mawgan: Cornish: Lannhernow
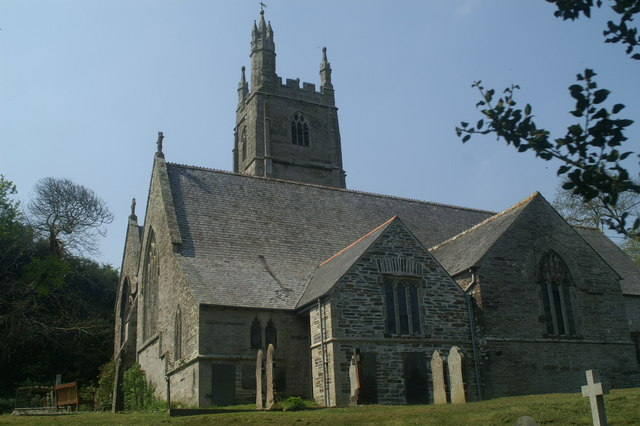
- St Mawgan Church

- Location within Cornwall
- Population: 1,307 (Civil Parish, 2011)
- OS grid reference: SW872659
- Civil parish: St Mawgan
- Unitary authority: Cornwall
- Ceremonial county: Cornwall
- Region: South West
- Country: England
- Sovereign state: United Kingdom
- Post town: NEWQUAY
- Postcode district: TR8
- Dialling code: 01637
- Police: Devon and Cornwall
- Fire: Cornwall
- Ambulance: South Western
- UK Parliament: North Cornwall

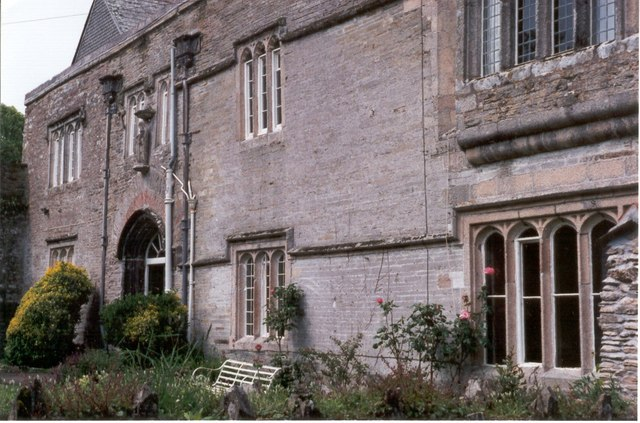
Lanherne House, the manor house of St Mawgan

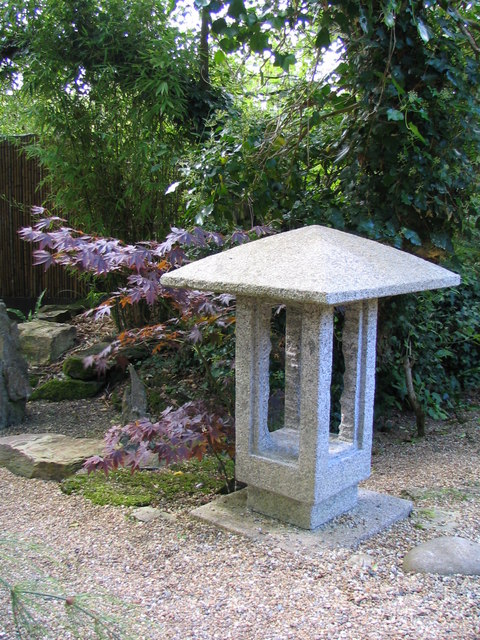
The Japanese Garden, St Mawgan

St Mawgan or St Mawgan in Pydar (Cornish: Lannhernow) is a village and civil parish in Cornwall, England, United Kingdom. The population of this parish at the 2011 census was 1,307. The village is situated four miles northeast of Newquay, and the parish also includes the hamlet of Mawgan Porth. The surviving manor house known as Lanherne House is an early 16th-century grade I listed building. The nearby Royal Air Force station, RAF St Mawgan, takes its name from the village and is next to Newquay Airport. The River Menalhyl runs through St Mawgan village and the valley is known as The Vale of Lanherne. It was the subject of a poem by poet Henry Sewell Stokes.

== History ==
There is evidence of Bronze Age and Iron Age settlements, though the village history proper is considered to start from the arrival of the Welsh missionary St Mawgan (or Meugan) and his followers in the 6th century when they set up a monastery and the first church. The church was replaced by a Saxon church in the 11th century, which was in its turn replaced in the 11 and 12th centuries by the current parish church.

The Arundell family "of Lanherne" have been the chief landowners in St Mawgan since the 13th century. It was a branch of the prominent and widespread Arundell family also seated at Trerice, Tolverne, Menadarva in Cornwall and at Wardour Castle in Wiltshire. In 1794 Lanherne House, mainly built in the 16th and 17th centuries, became a convent for émigré nuns from Belgium. Many memorials of the Arundells survive in the parish churches of St Mawgan, dedicated to St Mauganus and St Nicholas, including monumental brasses to George Arundell (1573), Mary Arundell (1578), Cyssel and Jane Arundell (ca. 1580), Edward Arundell (c.1586). Further memorials of the Arundells survive in the nearby St Columba's Church, St Columb Major.

== Parish church ==
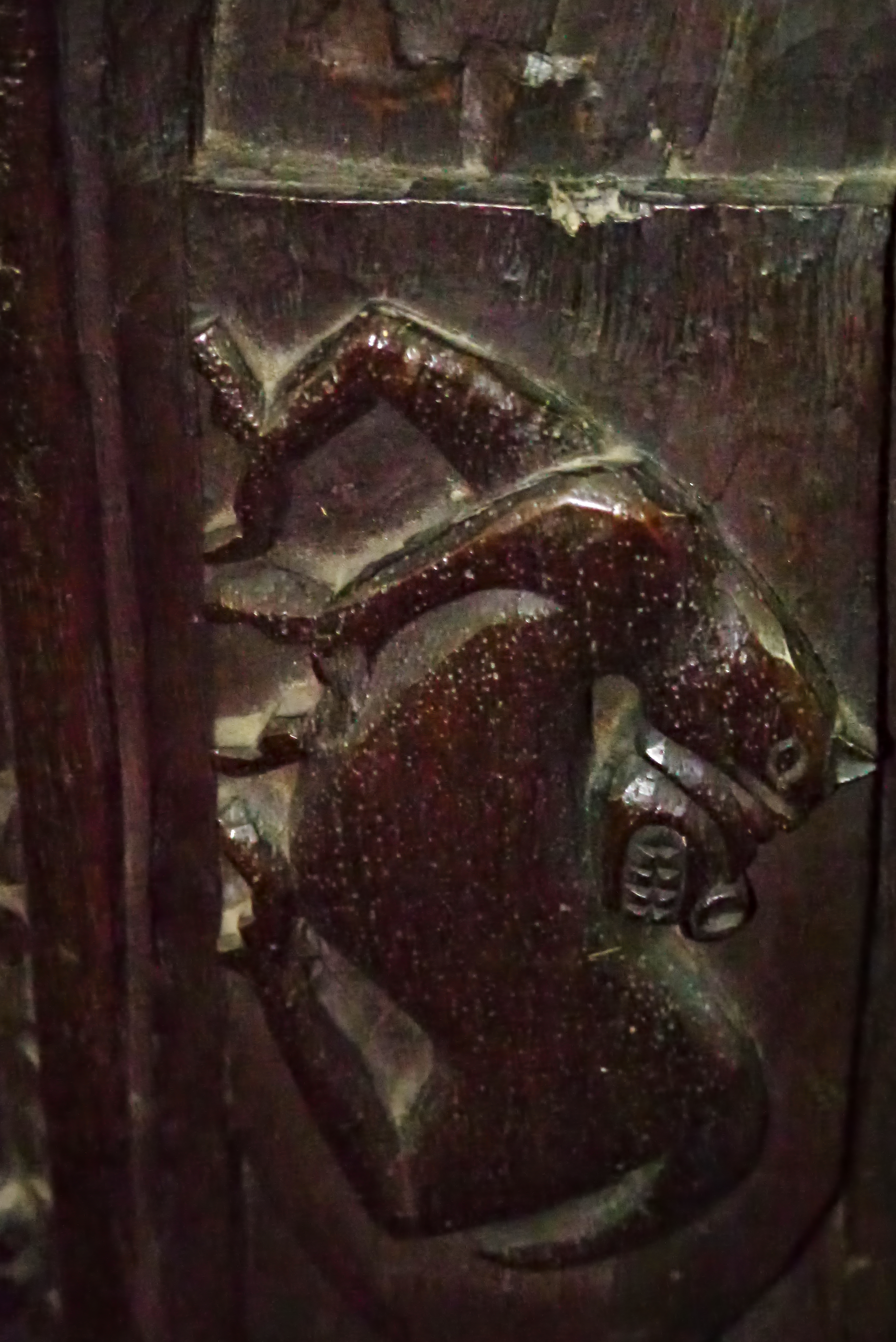
Benchend of a pew in the church, carved in the form of a horse

St Mawgan has a 13th-century parish church, dedicated to St Mauganus and St Nicholas. The church was originally a cruciform building of the 13th century but was enlarged by a south aisle and the upper part of the tower in the 15th. The unusual rood screen and bench ends are noteworthy and there are many monumental brasses to members of the Arundell family; these include George Arundell, 1573, Mary Arundell, 1578, Cyssel and Jane Arundell, c. 1580, Edward Arundell (?), 1586, The Arundell brasses are mostly in a fragmentary state; parts of some of those originally in the church have been removed to Wardour Castle. (St Mauganus was a Welshman and is also honoured at Mawgan-in-Meneage, and in Wales and Brittany.)

== Historic estates ==
=== Lanherne ===
Lanherne House was the manor house for the Arundell family "of Lanherne", lords of the manor of St Mawgan, chief landowners in the parish since the 13th century, many of whose monuments survive in the parish church. They were a branch of the prominent and widespread Arundell family also seated at Trerice, Tolverne, Menadarva in Cornwall and at Wardour Castle in Wiltshire. Lanherne House has been the Lanherne Convent since 1794.

=== Nanskeval ===
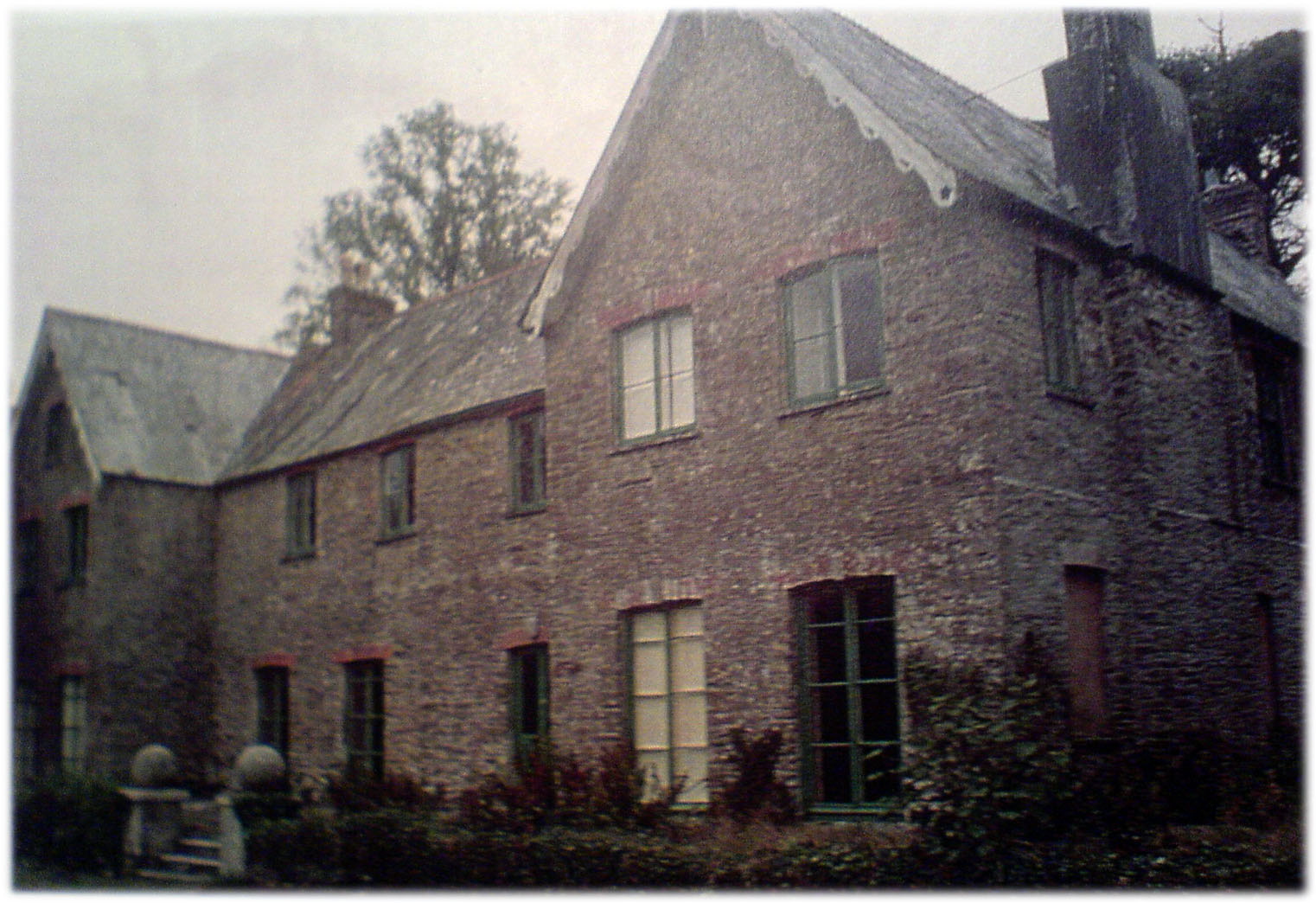
Nanskeval House, St Mawgan

Nanskeval House was on the parish boundaries of St Mawgan in Pydar (it was demolished in the mid-1970s) and St Columb Major: in 1277 it was spelt Nanscuvel. Nanskeval House was once the home of Liberal MP Edward Brydges Willyams and is still part of the Carnanton estate which is still owned by descendants of the same family. Nans means 'valley' in Old Cornish, and Kivell was thought to derive from the Cornish equivalent of the Welsh word ceffyl, meaning a horse. but as the Cornish for horse is Margh this is an erroneous interpretation. Much more likely is "The valley of the Woodcock" as the Cornish for woodcock is 'Kevelek'. The surname Nankivell and its variants are thought to derive from this place.

== Amenities ==
The village has one pub, The Falcon Inn. Also at St Mawgan is a bonsai tree nursery and a Japanese Garden attraction, plus a small craft shop. There are two local cricket teams which play Sunday friendlies, the Vale of Lanherne C.C. and St Mawgan C.C.

== Antiquities ==
Arthur Langdon (1896) recorded two Cornish crosses in the parish: one, a small cross, is at Mawgan Cross and the other at Lanherne. The Lanherne cross is a highly ornamented example and stands in the grounds of the nunnery having been brought from Roseworthy in the parish of Gwinear. "It is the most beautiful specimen of an elaborately decorated cross in Cornwall." Andrew Langdon (1994) records four crosses. These are the Lanherne cross, the churchyard cross, Bodrean Cross and Mawgan Cross. The churchyard cross is the best preserved medieval lantern cross in Cornwall. Bodrean Cross (a cross head and small part of the shaft) was found in 1904 at Bodrean Farm in the parish of St Clement. In 1906 the cross head was provided with a new shaft and set up in St Mawgan churchyard.

== Gerald the Giraffe ==
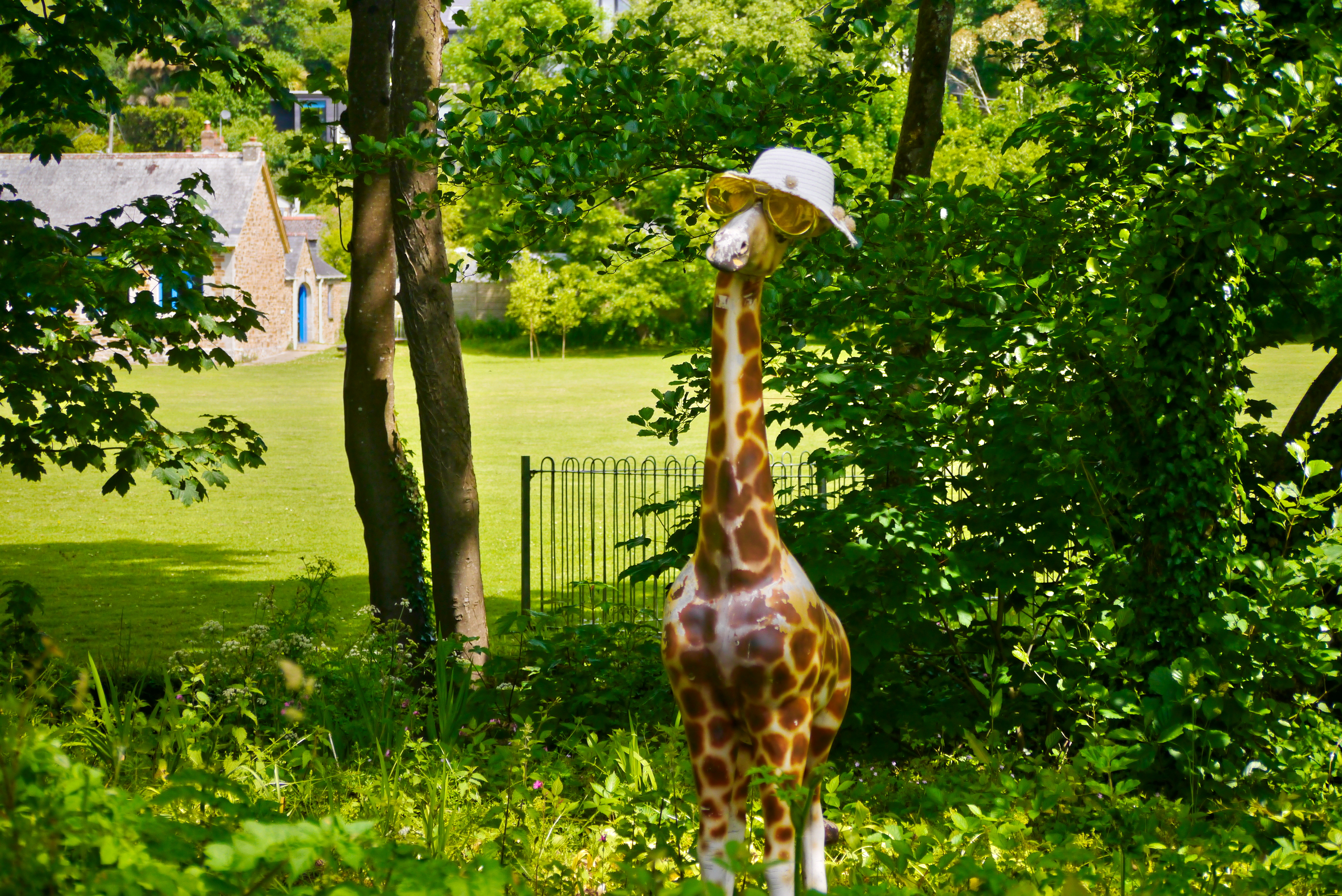
Gerald the Giraffe in a summer outfit

The Village is also host to a Giraffe known locally as Gerald. Initially placed on a temporary basis the Giraffe became a popular addition with the local residents. Stories about Gerald, written by the children from the local primary school, have been featured in the local village magazine.

== Climate ==
Climate data for Newquay Airport WMO ID: 03817; coordinates 50°26′19″N 4°59′47″W; elevation: 103 m (338 ft); 1991–2020 normals, extremes 1960–present
Month	Jan	Feb	Mar	Apr	May	Jun	Jul	Aug	Sep	Oct	Nov	Dec	Year
Record high °C (°F)	15.1 (59.2)	18.4 (65.1)	22.2 (72.0)	24.3 (75.7)	27.9 (82.2)	31.3 (88.3)	31.4 (88.5)	32.4 (90.3)	29.9 (85.8)	26.5 (79.7)	19.2 (66.6)	16.5 (61.7)	32.4 (90.3)
Mean daily maximum °C (°F)	9.0 (48.2)	9.0 (48.2)	10.4 (50.7)	12.5 (54.5)	15.1 (59.2)	17.5 (63.5)	19.1 (66.4)	19.1 (66.4)	17.7 (63.9)	14.6 (58.3)	11.7 (53.1)	9.7 (49.5)	13.8 (56.8)
Daily mean °C (°F)	6.7 (44.1)	6.6 (43.9)	7.7 (45.9)	9.4 (48.9)	12.0 (53.6)	14.5 (58.1)	16.3 (61.3)	16.4 (61.5)	14.9 (58.8)	12.2 (54.0)	9.4 (48.9)	7.4 (45.3)	11.1 (52.0)
Mean daily minimum °C (°F)	4.3 (39.7)	4.1 (39.4)	5.1 (41.2)	6.4 (43.5)	8.9 (48.0)	11.5 (52.7)	13.5 (56.3)	13.7 (56.7)	12.1 (53.8)	9.8 (49.6)	7.1 (44.8)	5.1 (41.2)	8.5 (47.3)
Record low °C (°F)	−9.0 (15.8)	−8.5 (16.7)	−8.5 (16.7)	−2.1 (28.2)	1.0 (33.8)	2.7 (36.9)	7.4 (45.3)	7.2 (45.0)	4.9 (40.8)	−0.1 (31.8)	−4.2 (24.4)	−6.7 (19.9)	−9 (16)
Average precipitation mm (inches)	109.0 (4.29)	83.2 (3.28)	68.8 (2.71)	65.7 (2.59)	58.4 (2.30)	63.1 (2.48)	71.5 (2.81)	71.3 (2.81)	77.2 (3.04)	108.0 (4.25)	127.7 (5.03)	115.7 (4.56)	1,019.4 (40.13)
Average precipitation days (≥ 1.0 mm)	16.4	13.3	12.4	11.1	9.8	10.1	11.4	12.1	11.5	15.2	17.8	17.1	158.1
Mean monthly sunshine hours	67.8	91.1	133.3	194.3	224.2	219.5	207.5	196.7	167.1	119.8	75.1	61.6	1,758
Source 1: Met Office
Source 2: Royal Dutch Meteorological Institute

== Cornish wrestling ==
St Mawgan has been a major centre for Cornish wrestling over at least the last few centuries. Matches have always been held on the recreation ground in churchtown.

The St Mawgan wrestling committee was instrumental in the split of the Cornwall County Wrestling Association, helping form the East Cornwall Wrestling Federation ("ECWF") in 1934.

St Mawgan has been home to the Cawley family that have been dominant in Cornish wrestling over the last 40 years:

- Gerry Cawley: Heavyweight champion 1983, 1984, 1996, 2002 and 2007. Light heavyweight champion: 1983, 1989, 1993, 1995 through to 2001 and 2011. Middleweight champion 1994, 1998, 2011 and 2015. Interceltic games: under 18s heavyweight champion 1978, under 18s champion 1979 and middleweight champion 1980.
- Richard Cawley snr: Interceltic games under 16s lightweight champion 1976
- Mike Cawley: Interceltic games heavyweight champion 1982 and 1985.
- Ashley Cawley: Heavyweight champion 2005, 2006, 2008, 2010, 2011, 2012, 2013, 2014 and 2016. Light heavyweight champion: 2015. Interceltic games: heavyweight champion 2008,
- Richard Cawley: Heavyweight champion 2009, 2015, 2017 and 2018. Light heavyweight champion: 2016.
- John Cawley: Light heavyweight champion: 2014.

== Education and recreation ==
The parish has one small primary school: St Mawgan-in-Pydar Primary School. Secondary education is provided by schools in Newquay.

== Notable residents ==
=== Arundells of Lanherne ===
- John FitzAlan, 1st Baron Arundel (c.1348–1379), known as Sir John Arundell of Lanherne, a naval commander and Lord Marshal of England
- John Arundell (circa 1366–1435), called The Magnificent, of Lanherne
- John Arundell (1392–1423), MP for Cornwall, 1404,1406,1411,1414,1416,1417,1422 and 1423
- John Arundell, (1474–1545) of Lanherne, Receiver General of the Duchy of Cornwall
- Sir John Arundell (c.1500–1557), MP for Cornwall, 1554
- John Arundell of Lanherne, (1527–1590), MP for Helston, Shaftesbury, Preston and Cornwall in 1558

=== and ===
- Richard Parkyn (c.1772–1855), a champion Cornish wrestler.
- Gerry Cawley (born ca.1975), Cornish wrestling champion

== In Art and Literature ==
In Fisher's Drawing Room Scrap Book, 1835, a poetical illustration St. Mawgan Church, & Lanhern Nunnery, Cornwall. is based on an engraving of a painting by Thomas Allom.
