= William Bodrugan (fl. 1420–1433) =

English politician

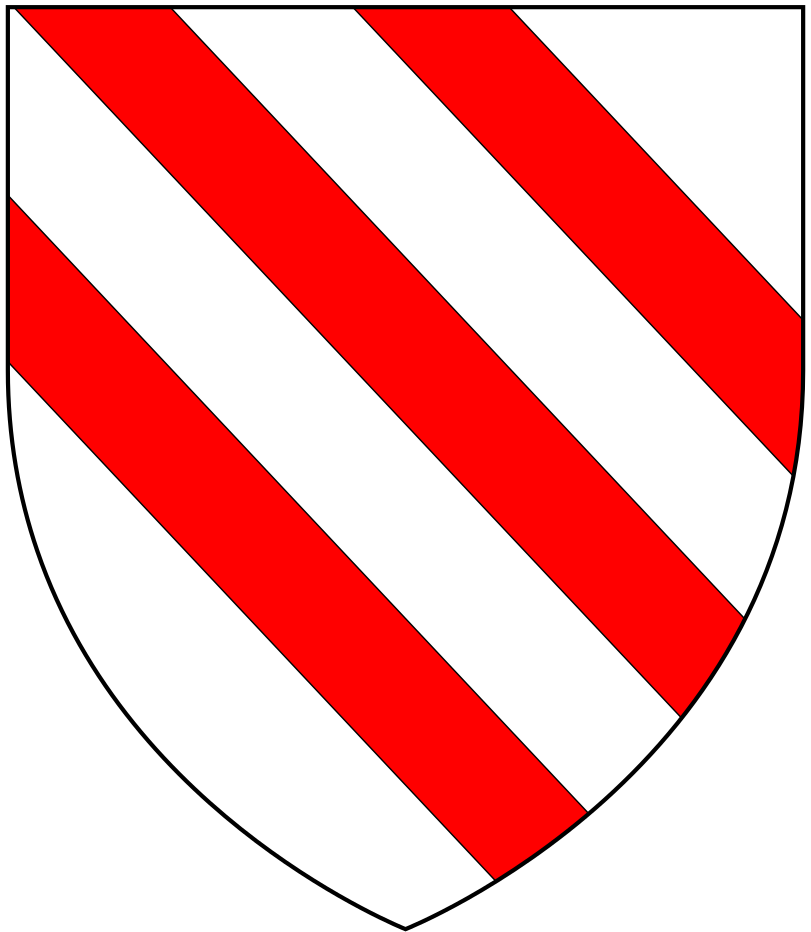
Arms of Bodrugan, Argent, three bendlets gules

Sir William Bodrugan (c. 1398 – 24 December 1441) was an English politician.

== Family ==
He was the son of William Bodrugan, MP.

== Career ==
He was a member (MP) of the Parliament of England for Cornwall in 1420, 1426, 1429, 1431, and 1433. He was also Sheriff of Cornwall and justice of the peace for Cornwall.
