= William Bodrugan (fl. 1384–1401) =

Member of the Parliament of England

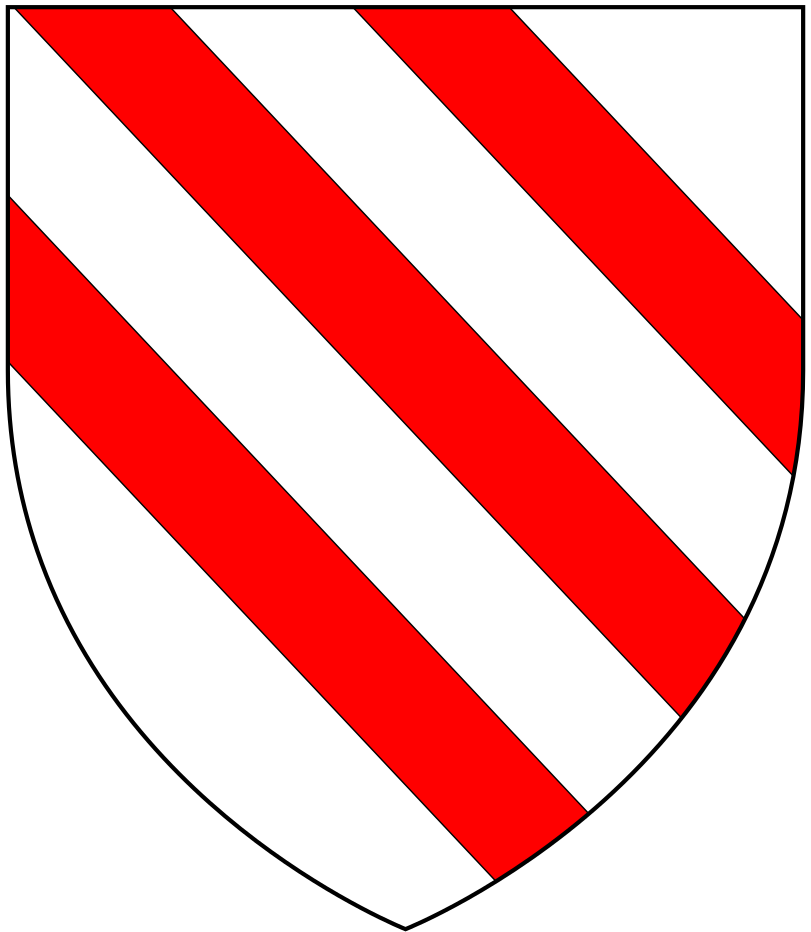
Arms of Bodrugan, Argent, three bendlets gules

William Bodrugan (fl. 1384–1401) was an English politician and grandson of politician Otto I Bodrugan (died 1331). He was a son of Otto Bodrugan.

He was a member (MP) of the Parliament of England for Helston in April 1384, Launceston in February 1388 and Cornwall in 1401. He was tax collector of Cornwall (1404) and probably sheriff of Cornwall (1401–1403).
