= High Sheriff of Cornwall =

Ceremonial officer of the English county

The right to choose high sheriffs each year is vested in the Duchy of Cornwall. The Privy Council, chaired by the sovereign, chooses the sheriffs of all other English counties, other than those in the Duchy of Lancaster. This right came from the Earldom of Cornwall. In the time of earls Richard and Edmund, the steward or seneschal of Cornwall was often also the sheriff.

== Sheriffs before the 14th century ==
- T.R.E.: Nigel
- 1086: Turstig
- Baldwin
- c. 1096: Warin
- bef. 1129: Frawin
- 1139: Geoffrey de Furnell
- 1156: Richard de Redvers, 2nd Earl of Devon
- Bernard
- 29 September 1174: Eustace, son of Stephen
- 1176–1181: Eustace, son of Stephen
- 29 September 1178: Alan de Furneaux
- 1181–1185: Alen de Furnell
- Easter 1184: Hugh Bardulf
- 29 September 1187 – 29 September 1189: William de Bockland
- 1191–1200: Richard Revel
- Christmas 1193: Richard Revel
  - Henry de Furneaux undersheriff
- 29 September 1198: William of Wrotham and John de Torrington
- Easter 1199: Hugh Bardulf
  - Osbert fitz William undersheriff
- 1200: John de Torrington
- 1201: Hugh Bardulf
- Easter 1200: William Brewer
  - Ralph de Mora undersheriff
- 1201: William de Briewere
- 29 September 1200: Richard Flandrensis
- 1202–1203: Richard Flandrensis
- 24 February 1202: Hubert de Burgh
- Easter 1202: William Brewer
  - Ralph de Mora undersheriff
- 1203–1204: William de Briewere
- 1204: Ralph de Mora
- 5 April 1204: William de Botterell
- 1205–1210: William de Botterells
- 15 December 1207: Richard fitz Richard
- 19 March 1208: Geoffrey de Neville
- 28 December 1208: John fitz Richard
- 1210–1216: John, son of Richard
- 30 May 1215: Robert de Cardinan
- 17 September 1215: Henry FitzCount
- 16 November 1215: Robert de Cardinan
- 7 February 1217: Henry FitzCount
- 10 July 1220: Robert de Cardinan
- 1219–1221: William Lunet
- 5 September 1220: William de Putot
- 8 December 1220: John fitz Richard
  - Christmas 1220: Walter de Treverbin undersheriff
- 8 May 1221: Reginald de Valle Torta
  - to 29 September 1224: Walter de Treverbin undersheriff
- 1223: Reginald de Valle Torta, of Saltash
- 1223–1224: Walter de Treverbin alias Trevarthen
- 1225: William Bregnam junior
- 1225: Reginald de Langford
- 1225: Reginald de Valle Torta
- 1225–1227: Henry de Bodrugan
- 1220s: John fitz Richard
- 1231–1233: Simon de Brackley
- 1230s: Robert fitz William
- 1230s: Walter de Treverbin
- 1241–1242, 1240s: John de Chiverton
- 1240s: Odo de Treverbin
- 1251: Dudemannus
- 29 September 1256: Stephen Heym
- June 1259: Sir Guy de Nunnant
- 29 September 1259: Ralph de Arundell, of Lanherne
- 1264: John Beaupre
- 1265: Ralph de Arundell
- 1269: John Beaupre
- 29 September 1273: Richard de Scitone
- 1275–1276: Ralph Wiggen or John Wigger
- 1277: Robert de Cheney or Chini, of Bodannan in St Endellion
- 29 September 1278: William de Monketon
- 1277–1278: William de Monkeston or Muncheton
- January 1279 – 29 September 1280: Thomas le Ercedeckne
- 1279–1286: Alexander de Sabridsworth
- 29 September 1282: William de Monketon
- 29 September 1285: William de Monketon and Roger de Ingepenne
- 29 September 1286: Roger de Ingepenne
- 1287–1288: Simon de Berkeley
- 29 September 1288: Edmund, 2nd Earl of Cornwall
- 1289–1300: Edmund, 2nd Earl of Cornwall

== 14th-century sheriffs ==
- 1 October 1300: Thomas de la Hyde or Hyda
- 1302: Robert de Elford
- 6 August 1307: Piers Gaveston
- 25 June 1308: Thomas de la Hyde
- 5 August 1309: Piers Gaveston
- 19 June 1312: Thomas de la Hyde
- 20 July 1312: John de Bedewynde
- 1312: William III Basset (1300–1340) of Tehidy
- 1313: Thomas de la Hyde
- Michaelmas 1313: Thomas L'Erchdekne or Archdeacon, of Ruan Lanihorne
- 18 November 1314: Richard de Polhampton
- 4 November 1315: Richard de Hiwish
- 15 May 1316: Henry de Wyllynton or Wylyngton, of Gittisham in Devon
- 25 July 1317: Isabella of France
- July 1317: Henry de Wyllynton
- 1320–1322: Isabella of France
- Easter 1321: John de Trejagu
- Michaelmas 1323: William de Bottreaux
- 1323: John de Trejagu, of Fentongollan in St Michael Penkevil
- 1324: Isabella of France
- 26 September 1324: John de Trejagu, of Fentongollan in St Michael Penkevil
- 1327: Isabella of France
- Easter 1327: Robert de Bilkemore
- 1329: Robert de Bilkemore
- Michaelmas 1329: William de Beauchamp
- 1 December 1330: William de Beauchamp
- 18 January 1331: Robert de Bilkemore
- 10 February 1331: William de Bottreaux
- 1332: William III Basset (1300–1340) of Tehidy
- 1332–1333: Sir William de Bottreaux, of Bottreaux Castle
- 5 July 1333: Henry de Trethewy
- 1334: William III Basset (1300–1340), of Tehidy
- 28 October 1334–1336: Sir John Petit, of Ardevora in Philleigh
- 8 November 1336: Oliver de Carminou (did not act)
- 1336: John de Chudleigh, of Ashton in Devon
- 1 February 1337–1338: John Hamley, of Halwin, and Sir John le Petit
- 18 March 1337: Edward, the Black Prince
  - 29 September 1338: Robert Beaupel, undersheriff
- 1338: Sir John Petit, of Ardevora in Philleigh
- 1340–1341: Edward, the Black Prince
  - 29 September 1340: Henry de Trethewy, undersheriff
- 1342: Henry Terril and Roger Prideaux
- 1343: Edward, the Black Prince
  - 29 September 1343: William de Campo Arnulfi, undersheriff
  - 29 September 1344: Thomas atte Fenne, undersheriff
- 1344: William Pypard
- 1345–1354: Edward, the Black Prince
  - 11 October 1346: Thomas atte Fenne, undersheriff
- 1354–1356: John Northcott
- 1356–1357: William Auncell or de Austell
- 1358: Edward, the Black Prince
- 1359: John Dabernoun
- 1360–1374: Edward, the Black Prince
- 1375: Sir Richard Serjeaux or Sergeux (Note: Served 1 October 1375 to 26 Oct 1376)
- 1378: Ralph Wampford
- 1379: Ralph Carminow, of Carminow in Mawgan-in-Meneage
- 1380: Otto Bodrugan
- 1381: William Talbot
- 1382: John Bevill, of Gwarnick in St Allen
- 1383: Sir Walter Archdeacon, of Antony and Ruan Lanihorne
- 1384: Sir William Fitzwalter
- 1385: Richard Kendall, of Treworgey in Duloe
- 1386: John Beville
- 1387: Nicholas Wampford
- 1388: John Colyn, of Boscarne
- 1389: Sir Richard Serjeaux, of Colquite in St Mabyn
- 1390: Thomas Peveral, of Park in Egloshayle
- 7 November 1390: Sir John Reskymer of Reskymer and Treloweth (died July 1391)
- 5 August 1391: William Talbot
- 1392: John Colyn
- 1393: John Colshull, of Tremadart in Duloe
- 1394: John Hearle, of Prideaux Castle in Luxulyan
- 1395: James Chudleigh
- 1396: William Talbot
- 1397: John Beville, of Woolston in Poundstock
- 1398: John Colshull, of Tremadart in Duloe
- 1399: Geoffrey St Aubyn or Guy St Aubyn, of Clowance

== 15th-century sheriffs ==
- 1400–1404: Henry of Monmouth
  - 28 October 1400: Sir William Marney undersheriff
  - Michaelmas 1401: Sir John Trevarthian undersheriff
  - Easter 1402: Sir John Arundell undersheriff, of Lanherne
  - 6 October 1402: William Bodrugan undersheriff
  - 22 October 1403: John Whalesborough undersheriff
  - Michaelmas 1404: John Grenville undersheriff
- Michaelmas 1406: John Polmorva
- 1406–1412: Henry of Monmouth
  - Michaelmas 1409: William Talbot undersheriff
  - Michaelmas 1410: John Grenville undersheriff
  - Michaelmas 1411: John Hanley undersheriff
  - Michaelmas 1412: John Arundell undersheriff
- 6 November 1413: John Kederowe or Renderow or Rederow
- 1 December 1415: Sir William Talbot
- 30 November 1416: Sir Otto Trevarthian, of Treworthen
- 10 November 1417: Henry Fulford
- 4 November 1418: Sir John Arundell, of Lanherne
- 23 November 1419: Stephen Derneford or Dunford, of Rame
- 16 November 1420: Sir John Arundell, of Trerice
- 1 May 1422: Sir Thomas Arundell
- 13 November 1423: Thomas Carminowe
- 16 November 1424: Sir William Talbot,
- 15 January 1426: Sir John Herle of Prideaux Castle
- 12 December 1426: Sir Thomas Arundell
- 7 November 1427: Sir William Bodrugan
- 4 November 1428: John Nanfan, of Trethewall
- 10 February 1430: Thomas Carminowe
- 5 November 1430: Robert Chamberlayne, of Court
- 26 November 1431: James Chudleigh or Chuddelegh
- 5 November 1432: Sir Thomas Arundell
- 5 November 1433: Sir John Herle
- 3 November 1434: Thomas Bonevill, of Trelawn
- 7 November 1435: John Yarde
- 8 November 1436: Thomas Whalesborough, of Whalesborough
- 7 November 1437: Sir Renfrew Arundell
- 3 November 1438: John Colshull
- 5 November 1439: John Nanfan
- 4 November 1440: John Marney or Murray or Mundy
- 4 November 1441: Thomas Whalesborough
- 6 November 1442: John Blewett, of Colan
- 4 November 1443: John Arundell
- 6 November 1444: John Botreaux
- 3 April 1445: Michael or Nicholas Power
- 4 November 1445: John Champernowne, of Insworke
- 4 November 1446: John Austell or de Austell
- 9 November 1447: Henry Fortescue
- 9 November 1448: John Trevelyan, of Trevelyan
- 20 December 1449: John II Basset, of Tehidy
- 3 December 1450: John Nanfan of Trethewall
- 8 November 1451: Thomas Budockshed (or Butside, Budshed, etc,), of Budockshed in the parish of St Budeaux
- 8 November 1452: William Daubeney
- 5 November 1453: Thomas Whalesborough
- 4 November 1454: John Petyt
- 14 July 1455: Sir John Petit, of Ardevora in Philleigh
- 4 November 1455: John Cockworthy or Conkworth or Cornworth
- 4 November 1456: John Nanfan
- late 1457: Edward of Westminster, Prince of Wales
  - late 1457: John Arundell undersheriff
  - late 1458: John Whalesborough undersheriff
  - late 1459: John Trevelyan undersheriff
- 7 November 1460: Roger or Richard Champernowne, of Halwyn and Insworke
- 7 November 1461: Renfrey Arundell, of Lanherne
- 5 November 1463: Thomas Bere, of Killigarth
- 5 November 1464: Avery, Alfred or Alured Cornburgh
- 5 November 1465: William Bere
- 5 November 1466: Sir John Colshull, of Tremadart in Duloe
- 5 November 1467: John Serjeaux or Sergeaux,
- 5 November 1468: Avery, Alfred or Alured Cornburgh
- 5 November 1469: Sir John Arundell, of Trerice
- 6 November 1470: Halnatheus Mauleverer
- Michaelmas 1470: John Fortescue
- 17 July 1471: Edward, Prince of Wales
  - 1471: John Fortescue undersheriff
- 1475: Richard, Duke of Gloucester
- late 1475: John Fortescue
  - late 1476: Giles Daubeney undersheriff
  - late 1477: William Carnesew undersheriff, of Bokelly in St Kew
  - late 1478: Sir Robert Willoughby undersheriff
  - late 1479: Richard Nanfan undersheriff
  - late 1480: Thomas Grenville undersheriff, of Stowe
  - late 1481: Thomas Fulford undersheriff
  - late 1482: John Treffry undersheriff, of Fowey
- 6 November 1483: Sir James Tyrrell, of Trerice
- 5 November 1484: Sir William Houghton
- 12 September 1485: Thomas Grenville, of Stowe
- 5 November 1486: John Tremayne, of Tremayne
- 4 November 1487: Alexander Carew, of Antony
- 4 November 1488: Richard Nanfan, knighted while in office
- 5 November 1489: Sir John Treffry
- late 1490: Arthur, Prince of Wales
  - late 1490: John Roscarrock undersheriff, of Roscarrock in Endellion
  - late 1491: Thomas Tregarthyn undersheriff, the younger, of Tregarthyn
  - late 1492: Richard Vyvyan undersheriff, of Treviddren in St Buryan
  - late 1493: Walter Enderby undersheriff
  - late 1494: Peter Bevill undersheriff, of Gwarnike in St Allen
  - late 1495: Edward Arundell undersheriff
  - late 1496: John Basset undersheriff, of Tehidy
  - late 1497: William Trevanion undersheriff
  - late 1498: Sir Piers Edgecombe, undersheriff, of Cotehele
  - late 1499: Sir John Treffry undersheriff

== 16th-century sheriffs ==
  - late 1500: William Treffry undersheriff
- 30 April 1502: Peter Bevill
- 8 November 1502: William Trevanion, of Caerhays
- 18 November 1503: John Godolphin, of Godolphin
- 5 November 1504: Richard Vyvyan
- 1 December 1505: Sir Piers Edgecombe
- 27 November 1506: Michael Vyvyan, of Trelowarren or Treviddren
- 3 December 1507: William Trevanion
- late 1508: Sir Thomas Trevanion
- 14 November 1509: Sir John Arundell, of Tolverne
- 9 November 1510: Roger Grenville
- 8 November 1511: William Carnesew, of Bokelly in St Kew
- 7 November 1512: James Erisey, of Erisey
- 9 November 1513: John Carminow, of Fentongollan
- 7 November 1514: John Carew,of Antony
- 5 November 1515: Sir William Trevanion
- 10 November 1516: Sir Piers Edgecombe,
- 9 November 1517: Sir John Bassett,
- 8 November 1518: Roger Grenville
- 8 November 1519: John Arundell, of Trerice and Talverne
- 6 November 1520: John Skewys (or Skuish), of Skewes in Cury
- 3 February 1522: Sir John Bassett
- 12 November 1522: Roger Grenville
- July 1523: Richard Grenville
- 13 November 1523: John Arundell of Trerice and Talverne
- 10 November 1524: William Lower, of Trelask in Lewannick
- 27 January 1526: Richard Penrose, of Penrose in Sithney
- 7 November 1526: Richard Grenville
- 16 November 1527: Hugh Trevanion
- 7 November 1528: John Chamond, of Launcells
- 9 November 1529: William Godolphin
- 11 November 1530: Christopher Tredinnick, of Tredinnick in St Breock
- 9 November 1531: John Arundell, of Trerice
- 20 November 1532: Sir Hugh Trevanion
- 17 November 1533: Sir William Godolphin
- 12 November 1534: Sir Piers Edgecombe
- 22 November 1535: Sir John Reskymer, of Reskymer in Mawgan-in-Meneage
- 27 November 1536: Sir John Chamond
- 14 November 1537: Sir Hugh Trevanion
- 15 November 1538: Sir William Godolphin
- 17 November 1539: John Reskymer
- 17 November 1540: Sir John Arundell
- 27 November 1541: Sir John Arundell
- 22 November 1542: Sir Hugh Trevanion
- 23 November 1543: Sir John Chamond
- 1544: Richard Chamond
- 16 November 1544: Richard Grenville
- 22 November 1545: Thomas St Aubyn, of Clowance in Crowan
- 23 November 1546: John Trelawny, of Poole in Menheniot
- 27 November 1547: Job Militon, of Pengersick Castle
- 3 December 1548: Richard Chamond
- 12 November 1549: Sir William Godolphin of Godolphin
- 11 November 1550: Richard Roscarrock, of Roscarrock in St Endellion
- 11 November 1551: Sir Hugh Trevanion
- 10 November 1552: Reginald Mohun, of Hall, Lanteglos-by-Fowey
- 8 November 1553: Sir John Arundell, of Trerice
- 14 November 1554: Sir John Arundell, of Lanherne, St Mawgan-in-Pyder
- 14 November 1555: Sir Richard Edgecumbe
- 13 November 1556: John Reskymer, of Reskymer in Mawgan-in-Meneage
- 16 November 1557: John Beville
- 23 November 1558: John Carminowe
- 9 November 1559: Reginald Mohun
- 12 November 1560: John Trelawny
- 8 November 1561: Richard Roscarrock, of Roscarrock in St Endellion
- 19 November 1562: Richard Chamond
- 8 November 1563: Henry Chiverton, of Kerrys in Paul
- 9 November 1564: Hugh Trevanion
- 16 November 1565: William Militon, of Pengersick Castle
- 18 November 1566: John Trelawny
- 18 November 1567: John St Aubyn
- 18 November 1568: Sir William Godolphin
- 12 November 1569: Peter Edgecombe
- 13 November 1570: Hugh Trevanion
- 14 November 1571: William Mohun
- 13 November 1572: Peter Courtney, of Trethurse
- 10 November 1573: John Arundell, of Trerice
- 15 November 1574: John Beville, of Gwarnike
- 15 November 1575: George Kekewich, of Catchfrench
- 13 November 1576: Richard Grenville
- 27 November 1577: William Mohun
- 17 November 1578: William Lower, of St Winnow
- 23 November 1579: Francis Godolphin, of Godolphin, knighted while in office
- 21 November 1580: John Arundell, of Talverne
- 27 November 1581: John Treffry or Fitz of Talverne
- 5 December 1582: Richard Carew, of Antony
- 25 November 1583: George Grenville, of Penheale, Egloskerry
- 19 November 1584: Thomas Cosworth, of Cosworth
- 22 November 1585: Thomas Roscarrock or John Roscarrock
- 14 November 1586: John Wrey, of Trebigh in St Ive
- 4 December 1587: Anthony Rous, of Halton in St Dominick
- 25 November 1588: Thomas St Aubyn, of Clowance
- 24 November 1589: William Bevill, of Killigarth
- 24 November 1590: Walter Kendall, of Treworgy
- 25 November 1591: George Kekewich, of Catchfrench
- 16 November 1592: Reginald Mohun, of Boconnoc or Richard Champernowne, of Halwin
- 26 November 1593: Thomas Lower, of St Winnow
- 21 November 1594: Jonathan Trelawny
- 27 November 1595: Charles Trevanion
- 22 November 1596: Bernard Grenville
- 25 November 1597: Peter Courtney
- 28 November 1598: William Bevill
- 2 December 1599: William Wrey
- 24 November 1600: Francis Buller, of Tregarrick

== 17th-century sheriffs ==
- 2 December 1601: Hannibal Vyvyan
- 7 December 1602: Anthony Rous, of Halton, St Dominick, knighted while in office
- 1 December 1603: Arthur Harris
- 5 November 1604: Sir Francis Godolphin
- 2 February 1606: Nicholas Prideaux, of Solden
- 17 November 1606: Digory Chamond
- 9 November 1607: John Arundell, of Trerice
- 12 November 1608: John Rashleigh and John Acland, of Fuller
- late 1609: Sir Christopher Harris
- late 1610: Henry Frederick, Prince of Wales
  - late 1610: Sir Richard Edgcumbe undersheriff
  - late 1611: Sir Richard Buller undersheriff
- late 1612: Sir William Wrey
- late 1613: William Coryton, of Newton Ferrers, St. Mellion
- late 1614: Richard Robarts, of Truro
- late 1615: John Chamond
- late 1616: William Code, of Morval
- late 1617: Francis Vyvyan, of Trewan
- late 1618: Sir Richard Carnesew, of Bokelly, St Kew
- late 1619: Reskymer Bonython, of Bonyithon in Cury
- late 1620: Nicholas Glynn, of Glynn
- 12 November 1621: Samuel Pendarves, of Roscrow in Gluvias
- late 1622: Sir John Speccot, of Penheale, Egloskerry
- late 1623: Richard Geddy, of Trebursy, St Petherwin
- late 1624: John Moyle, of Bake
- late 1625: Thomas Wyvell, of Wyvellscombe, St. Stephen-by-Saltash
- late 1626: John Trefusis, of Trefusis
- 4 November 1627: Jonathan Rashleigh, of Fowey and Menabilly
- late 1628: George John Hele, of Bennetts, Whitestone
- late 1629: John Rowe
- 7 November 1630: Sir John Trelawny, 1st Baronet, of Trelawne, Pelynt
- late 1631: John Prideaux
- late 1632: Sir Nicholas Lower, of Clifton, Landulph
- 10 November 1633: Charles Trevanion
- 5 November 1634: Hugh Boscawen
- late 1635: John St Aubyn
- 3 October 1636: Sir Richard Buller
- 30 September 1637: Francis Godolphin, of Godolphin, Breage
- 4 November 1638: Francis Godolphin, of Treveneage or Francis Tremayne
- late 1639: Richard Trevill
- late 1640: Francis Wills, of Wyvellscombe, near Saltash
- late 1641: John Grylls, of Court in Lanreath
- late 1642: Francis Basset, of Tehidy
- 1644: Richard Prideaux
- 15 July 1644: John St Aubyn
- 1 December 1646: Edward Herle, of Landue in Lezant
- 10 January 1648: William Standen
- 28 November 1648: Peter Jenkins
- 15 February 1649: Peter Kekewich
- 7 November 1649: John Ellyott, of St Germans,
- 28 January 1650 John Lampen, of Patrieda, Linkenhorne
- 7 November 1650: Andrew Trevill, of Tethy
- 4 November 1651: Richard Lobb
- 12 November 1652: Richard Treville, of Ninio
- 10 November 1653: John Eliot
- 25 November 1653: James Praed, of Ninio or Trevethow, Lelant
- late 1654: Edward Nosworthy, of Ince Castle, St. Stephens-by-Saltash
- late 1656: Anthony Nicholl, of Penvose, St. Tudy
- late 1657: Peter Jenkin, of Trekenning, St. Columb Major
- c. June 1658: John Littleton
- late 1658–1660: Nicholas Cossen or Coffen, of Roseveth in Kenwin
- 5 November 1660: Piers Edgecumbe,
- late 1661: Charles Grylls, of Court, Lanreath
- late 1662: Oliver Sawle, of Penrice, St. Austell
- late 1663: Edmond Prideaux
- late 1664: Sir Joseph Tredenham
- 12 November 1665: Thomas Darrel, of Trewornan, St. Minver
- 7 November 1666: John Connock
- 15 November 1666: John St Aubyn
- 6 November 1667: John Vivian, of Trewan, St. Columb Major
- 6 November 1668: Francis Gregor, of Trewarthenick, Cornelly
- 11 November 1669: John Nichols
- 24 November 1669: John Connock, of Treworgy, St Cleer
- 4 November 1670: Sir Walter Moyle, of Bake, St Germans
- 9 November 1671: John Nichols
- 11 November 1672: William Treville
- 12 November 1673: Peter Kekewich
- 5 November 1674: Nicholas Glynn, of Glynn, Cardinham, near Bodmin
- 15 November 1675: Samuel or Simon Cabell or Cavell, of Treharrow in St Kew
- 10 November 1676: Francis Trefusis, of Trefusis in Mylor
- 15 November 1677: Arthur Fortescue
- 17 November 1677: John Cotton
- 29 November 1677: William Jennings, of Saltash
- 14 November 1678: Thomas Coke, of Tregassow, St Erme
- 13 November 1679: John Cotton, of Botreaux Castle
- 4 November 1680: William Pendarves, of Pendarves, Camborne
- 10 November 1681: Sir Vyell Vyvyan, 2nd Baronet, of Trelowarren
- late 1681: Christopher Bellot, of Bochym in Cury
- 13 November 1682: Sir Vyell Vyvyan, 2nd Baronet, of Trelowarren
- 12 November 1683: Sir John Coryton, 2nd Baronet, of Newton Ferrers, St Mellion
- 1 December 1684: Sir Richard Edgcumbe
- 30 November 1685: Jonathan Rashleigh, of Menabilly
- 25 November 1686: Humphrey Borlase, of Truthan, St Erme or Treluddro
- 6 November 1688: Sir John Carew, 3rd Baronet
- 24 November 1688: John Buller
- 18 March 1689: Christopher Barnes
- 11 April 1689: William Bond
- 18 November 1689: John Morth, of Tremough in Mabe
- 27 November 1690: Sir John Molesworth, 2nd Baronet
- 21 December 1691: John Buller jnr,
- 17 November 1692: Christopher Baron
- 8 December 1692: Humphrey Nicholls,
- 16 November 1693: William Williams,
- 6 December 1694: Jacob Robin, of St Tew
- late 1694: John Tregagle, of Trevorder, St Breock
- 5 December 1695: Francis Wills, of Wyvelscombe
- 3 December 1696: John Barrett, of Goland or Penquite, St Sampsons
- 16 December 1697: Richard Erisey, of Erisey
- 6 January 1699: Edmund Prideaux
- 30 November 1699: Stephen Robins

== 18th-century sheriffs ==
- 28 November 1700: Charles Grylls jnr, of Court
- 1 January 1702: Hugh Tonkin, of Trevaunance
- 12 January 1702: Gregory Peter, of Harlyn
- 3 December 1702: William Williams, of Treworthy
- 7 January 1703: John Williams, of Bodenick
- 2 December 1703: Richard Tregear, of Launceston or Tregeare in Crowan
- 21 December 1704: Sir John St Aubyn, 2nd Baronet, of Clowance and St Michael's Mount
- 18 January 1705: John Williams, of Truthan
- 3 December 1705: Hugh Pyper, of Tresmarrow
- 14 November 1706: Emanuel Pyper, of Liskeard
- 20 November 1707: Francis Basset, of Tehidy
- 29 November 1708: Samuel Ennys, of Enys in Gluvias
- 1 December 1709: Paul Orchard, of Aldercombe in Kilkhampton
- 24 November 1710: Francis Hoblyn
- 14 January 1711: John Worth, of Penryn or Tremough in Mabe
- 13 December 1711: Samuel Kemp
- 12 January 1712: Lewis Tremaine
- 28 January 1712: John Cole, of Cartuther, Menheniot
- 11 December 1712: Samuel Kemp
- 5 January 1712: Edward Herle, of Landue, Lezant
- 30 November 1713: Edward Amy, of Botreaux Castle
- 16 November 1714: Joseph Silly, of Helligan
- late 1715: Francis Gregor, of Trewarthenick
- 19 November 1716: John Goodall, of Fowey
- 5 December 1716: William Addis, of Whiteford, Stoke Climsland
- late 1717: Dennis Arscott, of Ethy
- late 1718: John Arundell, of Trevelver
- late 1719: Erasmus Pascoe, of Trevassick, Phillack
- late 1720: George Robinson, of Bochym in Cury
- 9 January 1722: Edward Hoblyn, of Croan, Egloshayle
- 18 January 1723: Richard Polwhele, of Polwhele
- late 1723: Reginald Haweis, of Killiow in Kea
- late 1724: Thomas Long, of Penheale, Egloskerry
- late 1725: John Collins, of Treworgan in St Erme
- late 1726: Samuel Phillipps, of Maer, Poughill; died in office
- 23 August 1727: John Phillips, of Maer; replaced his father
- 10 January 1728: George Dennis, of Trenant in Duloe
- late 1728: John Saltren, of Treludick in Egloskerry
- late 1729: John Hill, of Lydcot in Morval
- late 1730: Nicholas Donnithorne, of Trevellas in St Agnes
- late 1731: Samuel Gilbert, of Tackbeare in Bridgerule
- 31 January 1733: Edward Crews, of Bosworgy, St Colomb Major
- 23 January 1734: James Tillie, of Pentillie
- 28 January 1735: William Symons, of Hatt, Botusfleming
- 27 January 1736: Ferdinando Wallis, of Trethill, Sheviock or Fentonwoon, Lanteglos
- late 1736: John Moyle, of Bake
- late 1737: John Hony, of Trenant in Menheniot
- 23 January 1739: Sir Francis Vyvyan, 4th Baronet, of Trelawarren
- late 1739: Francis Llewellin Leach, of Trethewell
- late 1740: John Fortescue, of Penwarne, Mevagissy
- late 1741: William Lemon, of Truro
- late 1742: Nicholas or Henry Glynn, of Glynn
- 18 February 1744: John Hickes, of Treruddock, Alternon or Trenethick
- 11 February 1745: Peter Goodal Coryton, of Fowey
- late 1745: John Pearce, of Tretheage, Stithians
- 18 February 1746: John Tremayne (of Heligan), of Heligan
- 12 February 1747: Henry Peter, of Harlyn
- late 1747: Edmund Cheyne, of Launceston
- late 1748: Henry John, of Camborne
- late 1749: Humphrey Prideaux, of Place, Padstow
- late 1750: John Enys, of Enys
- 14 January 1752: John Trewren, of Tredrever of Trewardreva, Constantine
- 7 February 1753: William Morshead, of Cartuther, Menheniot
- 31 January 1754: John Glanville, of Catchfrench
- 29 January 1755: Francis Beauchamp, of Pengreep, Gwennap
- 27 January 1756: John Sawle, of Penrice
- 4 February 1757: John Luke, of Treviles, Ruanlanihorne
- 27 January 1758: Swete Nicholas Archer, of Trelask in Lewannick and Truro
- 2 February 1759: Robert Lovell, of Trefusis
- 1 February 1760: Christopher Treise, of Lavethan or Trenant Park, Duloe
- 28 January 1761: Nicholas Kempe, of Roseteage, Gerran
- 15 February 1762: Philip Enouf, of Falmouth
- 4 February 1763: John Harrison, of Wearde House, near Saltash
- 10 February 1764: Hender Mountsteven, of Lancarfe
- 1 February 1765: William Churchill, of Redruth; died in office
- 1765: Leigh Dickinson; replaced his father-in-law
- 17 February 1766: Thomas Treffry, of Fowey
- 13 February 1767: John Carew, of Antony
- 15 January 1768: Francis Kirkham, of Croan, Egloshayle
- 27 January 1769: John Blewett, of Marazion
- 9 February 1770: Hugh Rogers, of Helston
- 6 February 1771: John Call, of Whiteford, Stoke Climsland
- 17 February 1772: James Vivian, of Pencalenick
- 8 February 1773: William Harris, of Rosewarne, Camborne
- 7 February 1774: John Price, of Penzance
- 6 February 1775: Peter Bown, of Rosemerrin or Mawnan
- 9 February 1776: John Eliot, of Trebursey
- 31 January 1777: Richard Gully, of Tresilian
- 28 January 1778: John Stackhouse, of Pendarves, Camborne
- 1 February 1779: Thomas Vyvyan jnr, of Trewan
- 2 February 1780: Darell Crabbe-Trelawny, of Coldrennick
- 5 February 1781: Sir John St Aubyn, of Clowance
- 1 February 1782: John Coryton, of Crocadon
- 10 February 1783: Christopher Hawkins, of Trewithen
- 9 February 1784: Joseph Beauchamp, of Pengreep, Gwennap
- 7 February 1785: William (or Weston) Helyar, of Newton Ferrars
- 8 February 1786: Sir Michael Nowell, of Falmouth
- 8 February 1787: Samuel Thomas, of Tregolls
- 6 February 1788: Francis Gregor, of Restormel Park or Trewarthenick
- 11 February 1789: Robert Lovell Gwatkin, of Killiow
- 1 February 1790: Richard Hichens, of Poltair
- 4 February 1791: Sir William Molesworth, 6th Baronet, of Pencarrow
- 27 January 1792: Davies Giddy, of Tredrea
- 28 January 1793: Francis Glanville, of Catchfrench
- 1 February 1794: Edward Archer, of Trelask
- 5 February 1795: Ralph Allen Daniel of Trelissick in Feock, and Truro
- 5 February 1796: George Enys, of Enys
- 1 February 1797: William Slade Gully, of Trevenen
- 1 February 1798: James Buller, of Shillingham
- 2 February 1799: Edmund John Glynn, of Glynn

== 19th-century sheriffs ==
- 10 February 1800: Matthew Mitchell, of Hengar
- 2 February 1801: Edward Collins, of Truthan
- 4 February 1802: Thomas Carlyon, of Tregrehan
- 1 February 1803: Thomas Rawlings, of Sander's Hill, Padstow
- 2 February 1804: Sir Lionel Copley, 2nd Baronet, of Bake
- 31 March 1804: John Bettesworth-Trevanion, of Caerhayes Castle
- 1 February 1805: Samuel Stephens, of Tregenna Castle
- 4 February 1806: Thomas Graham, of Penquite
- 3 February 1807: Sir William Call, 2nd Baronet, of Whiteford
- 1 February 1808: John Tillie Coryton, of Crocadon
- 1 February 1809: Charles Bagnall Agar, of Lanhydrock
- 1 February 1810: Richard Oxnam, of Rosehill, Penzance
- 5 February 1811: William Lewis Salusbury-Trelawny, of Penquite or Trelawne
- 29 January 1812: John Vivian, of Pencalenick
- 28 January 1813: John Colman Rashleigh, of Prideaux
- 3 February 1814: Rose Price, of Kenegie or Trengwaiton, Madron
- 25 January 1815: Sir Vyell Vyvyan, 7th Baronet, of Trelowarren
- 1 February 1816: Sir Arscott Ourry Molesworth, 7th Baronet, of Pencarrow
- 29 January 1817: William Arundell Harris, of Kennegy or Kenegie, Gulval and Lifton Park, near Launceston
- 26 January 1818: Francis Hearle Rodd, of Trebartha Hall
- 27 January 1819: Joseph Sawle Sawle, of Penrice
- 12 February 1820: William Rashleigh, of Menabilly
- 6 February 1821: Richard Vyvyan, of Trewan
- 4 February 1822: David Howell, of Prideaux
- 31 January 1823: Charles Trelawny, of Coldrinick
- 31 January 1824: John Samuel Enys, of Enys
- 2 February 1825: William Baron, of Tregear House, Laneast
- 30 January 1826: Thomas Daniell, of Trelissick
- 5 February 1827: Sir Charles Lemon, 2nd Baronet, of Carclew
- 13 February 1828: James Wentworth Buller, of Shillingham or William Buller, of Morval
- 11 February 1829: Gordon William Francis Booker Gregor, of Trewarthenick
- 2 February 1830: Edward Collins, of Truthan
- 31 January 1831: John Hearle Tremayne, of Heligan
- 6 February 1832: Edward Archer, of Trelaske
- 1833: Christopher Wallis Popham, of Antron Lodge or Trevarno, Sithney
- 1834: Charles Prideaux Brune of Prideaux Place, Padstow was initially named, but was replaced by Joseph Sawle Graves-Sawle, of Penrice
- 1835: John Buller, of Morval
- 1836: Arthur Kelly, of Kelly, Devon
- 1837: John Basset, of Tehidy Park
- 1838: Joseph Thomas Austen (later Treffry), of Place
- 1839: Deeble Peter Hoblyn, of Colquite though Sir Richard Vyvyan, 8th Baronet, of Trelowarren was initially named
- 1840: Sir Richard Vyvyan, 8th Baronet, of Trelowarren
- 1841: John Hornbrook Gill, of Bickham, Buckland Monachorum, Devon
- 1842: Sir William Molesworth, of Pencarrow
- 1843: William Marshall, of Treworgey
- 1844: Henry Lewis Stephens or Stevens, of Tregenna Castle
- 1845: Francis Rodd, of Trebartha Hall
- 1846: Christopher Henry Thomas Hawkins, of Trewithen
- 1847: Nicholas Kendall, of Pelyn, Lanlivery
- 1848: Augustus Coryton, of Pentillie
- 1849: Sir Samuel Thomas Spry, of Tregolis
- 1850: William Daubuz, of Killiow
- 1851: Sir William Williams, 1st Baronet, of Tregullow
- 1852: Sir Colman Rashleigh, 2nd Baronet, of Prideaux
- 1853: Richard Foster, of Castle, Lanlivery
- 1854: Francis Howell, of Ethy House
- 1855: William Henry Pole-Carew, of East Antony or Antony House
- 1856: Sir William Berkeley Call, of Whiteford
- 1857: Sir Henry Onslow, 3rd Baronet, of Hengar
- 1858: John Francis Buller, of Morval
- 1859: John Hearle Tremayne, of Heligan
- 1860: Humphrey Willyams, of Carnanton
- 1861: John Francis Basset, of Tehidy
- 1862: Major Thomas Tristram Spry Carlyon, of Tregrehan
- 1863: William Coulson, of Kenegie, Gulval
- 1864: Day Perry Le Grice, of Trereife
- 1865: John Michael Williams, of Caerhayes Castle
- 1867: Thomas Simon Bolitho, of Trengwainton
- 1868: Edward Coode, of St Austell or Polapit Tamar
- 1869: John Whitehead Peard, of Trenython House
- 1870: Edmund Beauchamp Tucker, of Trevince
- 1871: Arthur Tremayne, of Carclew
- 1872: Sir Charles Brune Graves-Sawle, 2nd Baronet, of Penrice
- 1873: Lieutenant-Colonel Shadwell Morley Grylls, of Lewarne
- 1874: John Christopher Baron Lethbridge, of Tregeare
- 1875: George Williams
- 1876: Francis Gilbert Enys
- 1877: Jonathan Rashleigh, of Menabilly
- 1878: William Cole Pendarves of Pendarves
- 1879: Michael Henry Williams of Pencalenick House

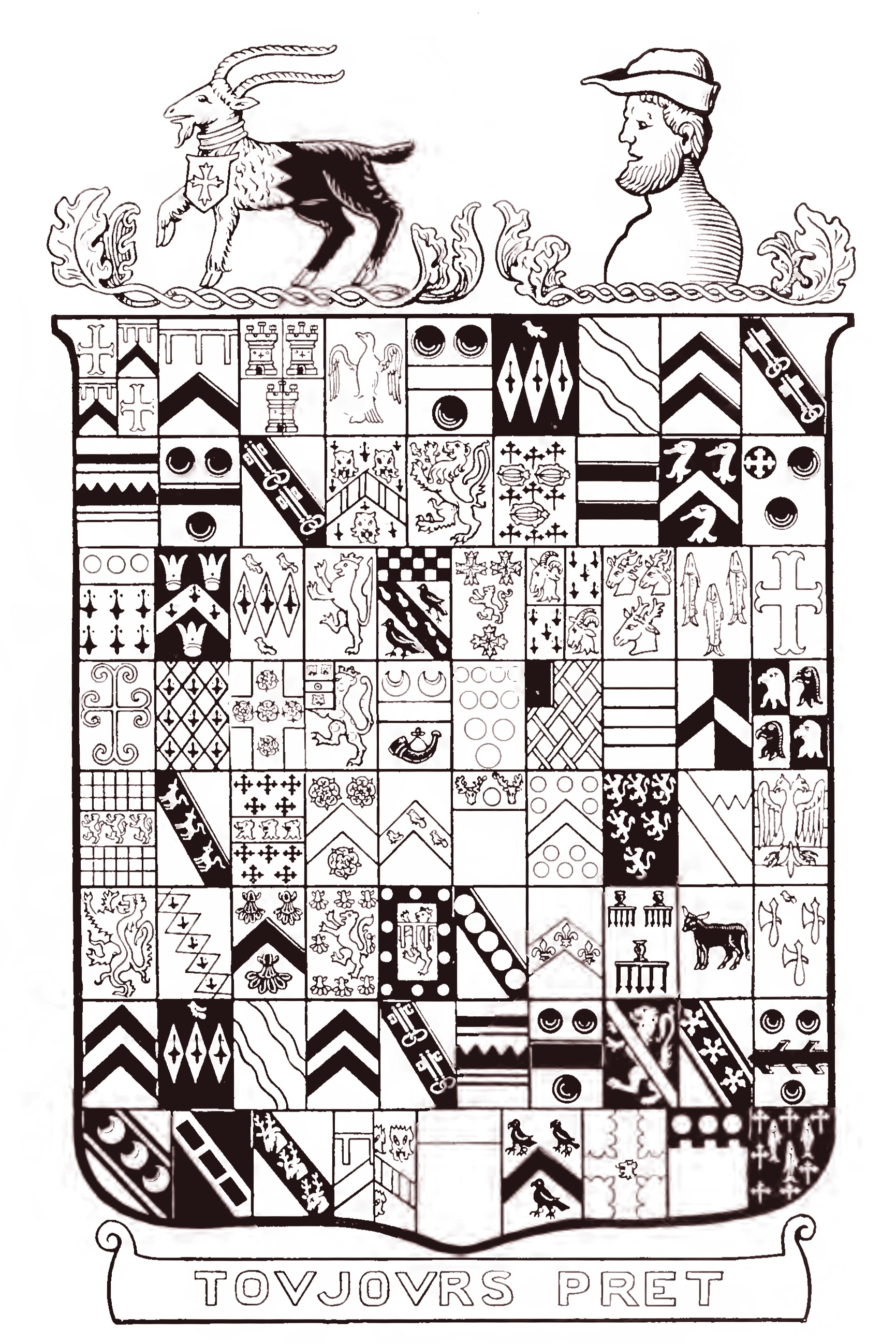
The Heraldic Achievement of Charles Glynn Prideaux-Brune.jpg

- 1880: Charles Glynn Prideaux-Brune of Prideaux Place, Padstow
- 1881: Charles Gurney
- 1882: Walter Deeble Boger of Wolsden
- 1883: Sir William Wallace Rhoderic Onslow, 5th Baronet of Hengar
- 1884: Thomas Bedford Bolitho of Trewidden
- 1885: Richard Foster of Lanwithan
- 1886: Charles Ebenezer Treffry
- 1887: Digby Collins of Newton Ferrers House
- 1888: John Charles Williams of Caerhays Castle
- 1889: Arthur Pendarves Vivian, of Bosahan, St Anthony in Meneage
- 1890: Thomas Robins Bolitho of Penalverne, Penzance.
- 1891: John Claude Daubuz of Killiow, Truro
- 1892: Edward Brydges Willyams of Carnanton, St Columb.
- 1893: William Bolitho, jnr of Ponsandane, Penzance
- 1894: John Bevill Fortescue of Boconnoc, Lostwithiel
- 1895: Sir William Trelawny of Trelawne, Liskeard
- 1896: Sir Robert Pearce Edgcumbe of Somerleigh Court, Dorchester and Reperry Manor, Cornwall
- 1897: Francis Layland-Barratt of Tregarne, St Austell
- 1898: Sir Robert Harvey
- 1899: Sir Lewis Molesworth, 11th Baronet of Trewartherick, Grampound Road
- 1900: Sir Robert Harvey, of Trenouth, Grampound

== 20th-century sheriffs before 1974 ==
- 1901: Arthur Francis Basset, of Tehidy, Camborne
- 1902: William Coryton, of Pentillie Castle, near Saltash
- 1903: Percival Dacres Williams of Lanarth, St Keverne
- 1904: John Simmons Tregoning of Landue, Launceston
- 1905: Richard Carlyon Coode
- 1906: Sir Walter John Trevelyan, 8th Baronet of Trevarthian, Marazion
- 1907: Sir Charles Augustin Hanson of Fowey Hall
- 1908: John Cosmo Stuart Rashleigh of Throwleigh, Okehampton, Devon
- 1909: Carew Davies Gilbert of Trelissick
- 1910: Francis Buller Howell of Ethy, Lostwithiel
- 1911: Henry Harcourt Williams of Pencalenick, Truro (1869–1927)
- 1912: Edward Hain of Trelyon
- 1913: Rear Adml. Sir Charles John Graves-Sawle, 4th Baronet of Penrice, St Austell
- 1914: Roger William Giffard Tyringham of Trevethoe
- 1915: Charles Hawkins Hext (1851–1917), of Trebah (Note: For more information, see Alice Hext, his wife.)
- 1916: Col. Charles Robert Prideaux-Brune of Prideaux House, Padstow
- 1917: George Tallack Petherick of Porthpean House, St Austell
- 1918: Edward Galton Baron Lethbridge of Tregeare House, Egloskerry
- 1919: Edward Charles Percival Sanford of St Minver, Wadebridge
- 1920: Robert Barclay Fox of Penjerrick, Falmouth
- 1921: John De Cressy Treffry
- 1922: Sir Hugh Molesworth-St Aubyn, 13th Baronet of Pencarrow, Egloshayle
- 1923: Henry Walter Hepburn-Stuart-Forbes Trefusis of Trefusis, Falmouth
- 1924: Cornelius Cecil Morley of Trelawne
- 1925: Alnod John Boger of Wolsdon, Antony, Torpoint
- 1926: George Horace Johnstone of Trewithen, Grampound Road, Nr Truro
- 1927: John Williams of Scorrier House, Scorrier
- 1928: Col Edward Treffry of Place, Fowey
- 1929: Camborne Haweis Paynter of Boskenna, Saint Buryan
- 1930: Robert Alexander Harvey of Trenowth, Grampound Road, Nr Truro
- 1931: Sir Edward Hoblyn Warren Bolitho of Trengwainton, Heamoor
- 1932: Capt. John Tillie Coryton of Pentillie Castle, St. Mellion
- 1933: Richard Vernon Favell of Foxstones, Penberth, St Buryan
- 1934: Edward Neynoe Willyams of Carnanton Mawgan in Pydar St Columb
- 1935: John Lionel Rogers of Penrose, Helston
- 1936: Capt. Charles Henry Tremayne of Carclew
- 1937: Charles Henry Le Grice of Trereife, Penzance
- 1938: Alfred Martyn Williams of Werrington Park, Launceston
- 1939: Sir Charles Edwin Bourne Hanson of Fowey hall, Fowey
- 1940: Norman Robert Colville of Penheale Manor, Egloskerry
- 1941: William Reginald Rendell
- 1942: Arthur Treve Holman of Chyverton, Truro
- 1943: George Grenville Fortescue of Boconnoc, Lostwithiel
- 1944: Michael Percival Williams of Lanarth, St Kevern
- 1945: Kenneth James Acton Davis
- 1946: Cuthbert Lloyd Fox
- 1947: Sir John Carew Pole
- 1948: Sir John Molesworth St Aubyn, 14th Baronet
- 1949: Brigadier Stephen Williams of Tregullow
- 1950: Sir Bernard Rawlings
- 1951: Lt. Col. Giffard Loftus Tyringham of Knoll House, Corfe Mullen, Wimborne
- 1952: Peter Michael Williams of Burncoose, Gwennap, Redruth
- 1953: Col. George Thomson of Catchfrench
- 1954: Sir John Tremayne Tremayne of Croan, Wadebridge.
- 1955: Major-General Charles Edward Edward-Collins of Trewardale in Blisland.
- 1956: Major Simon Edward Bolitho of Chycelin, Alverton
- 1957: Maurice Petherick of Porthpean House, St Austell
- 1958: Eric George William Warde Harrison of Tremeer, St Tudy
- 1959: Michael George Bickford-Smith, Trevarno, Helston
- 1960: Nicholas Kendall, Pelyn, Lostwithiel
- 1961: George Romney Fox of Trewardreva Manor, Constantine, Falmouth
- 1962: Col. William Geoffrey Petherick of Porthpean House, St Austell
- 1963: Cmdr. Richard Molyneux Favell of Foxstones, Penberth, St Buryan, Penzance
- 1964: Lt. Cmdr. David Verney of Trevella House, St Erme, Truro
- 1965: Henry Richard Graham-Vivian of Bosaham, Manaccan, Helston
- 1966: John Desmond Grenville Fortescue of The Stewardry, Boconnoc, Lostwithiel
- 1967: Henry Trefusis, Trefusis, Falmouth
- 1968: Francis Julian Williams, Caerhays Castle, Gorran, St. Austell
- 1969: Bernard Penrose, Killiow, Truro
- 1970: Charles Le Grice, Trereife, Penzance
- 1971: Brig. Charles Thurstan Edward-Collins of Popes Cottage, Blisland, Bodmin
- 1972: Major Jeffery Coryton of Pentillie Castle, Saltash
- 1973: Philip Hamilton Fox of Stable Court, Mawnan Smith, Falmouth

== 20th-century from 1974 (high sheriffs) ==
- 1974: John Francis Arthur St Aubyn, Baron St Levan of St Michael's Mount, Marazion
- 1975: Sir Arscott Molesworth-St Aubyn, 15th Baronet of Pencarrow, Washaway, Bodmin
- 1976: Lieutenant Commander Jeremy David Tetley of Garlenick Manor, Grampound, nr. Truro
- 1977: Geoffrey Jermyn Holborow of Ladock House, Ladock, Nr. Truro
- 1978: Christopher Petherick of Porthpean House, Porthpean, St. Austell
- 1979: Sir Richard Carew Pole, 13th Baronet of Antony House, Torpoint
- 1980: Gerald Strachan Pawle of Trehiven House, Madron, Penzance
- 1981: Major Edward Walter Moyle Magor of Lamellyn, St Tudy
- 1982: Simon Douglas Young-Jamieson of Carnanton House, St Columb Minor
- 1983: Elizabeth Alison Johnstone of Creed Barn, Grampound, Truro
- 1984: Robert David Lyle Lyle of Bonython Manor, Helston
- 1985: Maj.-Gen. Edward Michael Hall of Treworgey Manor, Liskeard
- 1986: Major Nathaniel Duncan Spry Grant-Dalton of Place House, St Anthony in Roseland, Portscatho, Truro
- 1987: Alice Lennox-Boyd, Viscountess Boyd of Merton of Winchcombe, Saltash
- 1988: Diana Evelyn Colville (née Legh) of Penheale Manor, Launceston
- 1989: George Edward Michael Trinick of Newton House, Lanhydrock, Bodmin
- 1990: John Michael Williams of Estray Parc, Budock, Falmouth
- 1991: David Treffry of Place, Fowey (1926–2000)
- 1992: Edward Michael Locks Latham of Trebartha Lodge, nr. Launceston
- 1993: Richard John Gilbert of Lancarffe, Bodmin
- 1994: Michael Galsworthy of Trewithen, nr. Truro
- 1995: Elizabeth Margaret Bolitho (née Cresswell) of Trengwainton. Penzance
- 1996: Jill Trench Morison (née Fox) of Boskenna, St. Martin-in-Meneage, Helston
- 1997: Major Charles Francis Thurstan Edward-Collins of Trewardale, Blisland, Bodmin
- 1998: Piers Reginald Thompson of Rosehill House, Rosehill, Fowey
- 1999: Lieutenant Commander Nicholas John Trefusis of Trefusis, Flushing, Falmouth
- 2000: Lady Frances Barbara Molyneux Banham (née Favell) of Penberth, St Buryan, Penzance

== 21st-century high sheriffs ==
- 2001: John Michael Williams
- 2002: Judith Ann Coode (née Hall) of Trebyan House, Lanhydrock
- 2003: Christopher Leslie Perkins of Porloe Farm, Mylor Churchtown
- 2004: James Piers Southwell St Aubyn of Tredrea Manor
- 2005: Peter John Dixon Hodgson of St Ives
- 2006: Louella Gage Hanbury-Tenison (née Williams) of Cabilla Manor, Bodmin
- 2007: Evelyn Arthur Hugh Boscawen of Tregothnan, Tresillian, Truro
- 2008: Sir Ralph Ferrers Alexander Vyvyan, 13th Baronet of Trelowarren, Helston
- 2009: Iain Anthony Mackie of Collon Barton, Lerryn, Lostwithiel
- 2010: James Piran Williams of Tregullow House, Scorrier
- 2011: Colonel Edward Bolitho, of Trengwainton
- 2012: Catherine Frances Mead (née Hussey) of Pengreep, Ponsanooth, Truro
- 2013: James Buller Kitson of Churchtown, Botus Fleming, Saltash
- 2014: Charles Henry Williams of Caerhays, Gorran, St Austell
- 2015: Anthony Desmond Grenville Fortescue of Boconnoc, Lostwithiel (died in office, 9 November 2015)
- 2016: Jane Margaret Hartley of Holywell Bay, Newquay
- 2017: Sarah Elizabeth Coryton (née Dewhurst) of Pentillie Castle, St Mellion
- 2018: Paul Young-Jamieson of Carnanton House
- 2019: John Willis of Wadebridge
- 2020: Katharine Mary Holborow, of Ladock House, Ladock
- 2021: (David) Mark Thomas of The Granary, Treguddick Mill, South Petherwin
- 2022: Andrew Nicholas Victor Williams of The Old Vicarage, Lanhydrock
- 2023: Toby George Howell Ashworth, of Crosswyn House, St Ewe, St Austell
- 2024: Stamford Timothy John Galsworthy, of Trewithen, Grampound Road, Truro
- 2025: Peter Geraint Richards, of Zebulun, Gorran Haven

== See also ==
- List of office holders of the Duchy of Cornwall

== Bibliography ==
- Hughes, A. (1898). List of Sheriffs for England and Wales from the Earliest Times to A.D. 1831. London: Eyre & Spottiswoode. (with amendments of 1963, Public Record Office)
- Page, Mark (February 2000). "Cornwall, Earl Richard, and the Barons' War". The English Historical Review. 115 (460): 21–38. doi:10.1093/ehr/115.460.21. JSTOR 579433.
- Polsue, Joseph, ed. (1872). A Complete Parochial History of the County of Cornwall. Vol. 4. Truro: William Lake.
- Polwhele, Richard (1816). The Civil and Military History of Cornwall. Vol. 4. London: Cadell and Davies.
