= John Arundell (born 1576) =

Canting arms of Arundell of Trerice: Sable, six martlets argent, alluding to the French hirondelle, a swallow

John Arundell (1576 – December 1654), Esquire, of Trerice in Cornwall, later given the epithet "Jack for the King", was a member of an ancient Cornish gentry family, who as a Royalist during the English Civil War served King Charles I as Governor of Pendennis Castle, Falmouth. In 1646 he retained the castle in a heroic manner during a five-month-long siege by Fairfax, during which his forces were reduced by hunger to eating their horses, and finally achieved an honourable surrender

He served twice as MP for the prestigious county seat of Cornwall (1601 and 1621), and for his family's pocket boroughs of Tregony (1628) and Mitchell (1597) and also for St Mawes (1624). His family "of Trerice" should not be confused with the contemporary ancient and even more prominent Cornish family of Arundell "of Lanherne", six miles north of Trerice, "The Great Arundells", with which no certain shared origin has been found, but which shared the same armorials, the Arundell swallows.

== Origins ==
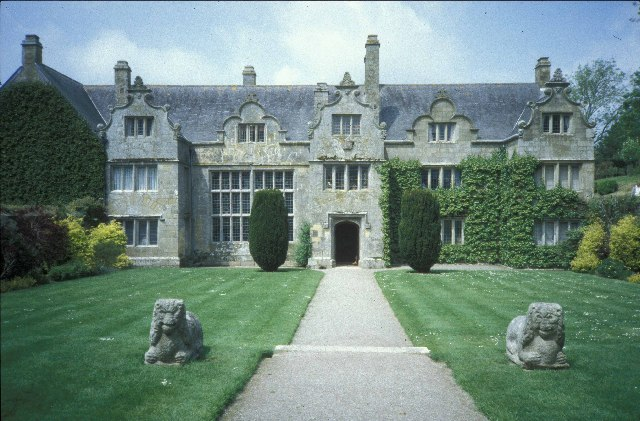
Trerice House, in the parish of Newlyn in Pyder, near Newquay, Cornwall, as rebuilt in 1572 by John Arundell (died 1580). The manor was the main seat of the Arundell family "of Trerice" from the 14th century to 1768

He was born in 1576, the eldest son and heir, by his second wife, of John Arundell (died 1580) of Trerice, a member of parliament for Mitchell, Cornwall, in 1555 and 1558, and Sheriff of Cornwall in 1573–1574, who built the present mansion house at Trerice in about 1572.

His mother was Gertrude Denys, a daughter of Sir Robert Denys (died 1592) of Holcombe Burnell in Devon, by his first wife Mary Mountjoy (a first cousin to Lady Jane Grey), a daughter of William Blount, 4th Baron Mountjoy (1478–1534), by his fourth wife Dorothy Grey, daughter of Thomas Grey, 1st Marquess of Dorset. Gertrude survived her husband and remarried to Edward, Lord Morley. John VII's younger brother was Thomas Arundell of Duloe, Cornwall, MP for West Looe, a soldier who served in the Netherlands. His grandfather was Sir John Arundell (1495–1561), of Trerice, later known as "Jack of Tilbury", an Esquire of the Body to King Henry VIII whom he served as Vice-Admiral of the West. He was knighted at the Battle of the Spurs in 1513 and was twice as Sheriff of Cornwall, in 1532 and in 1541.

== Career ==
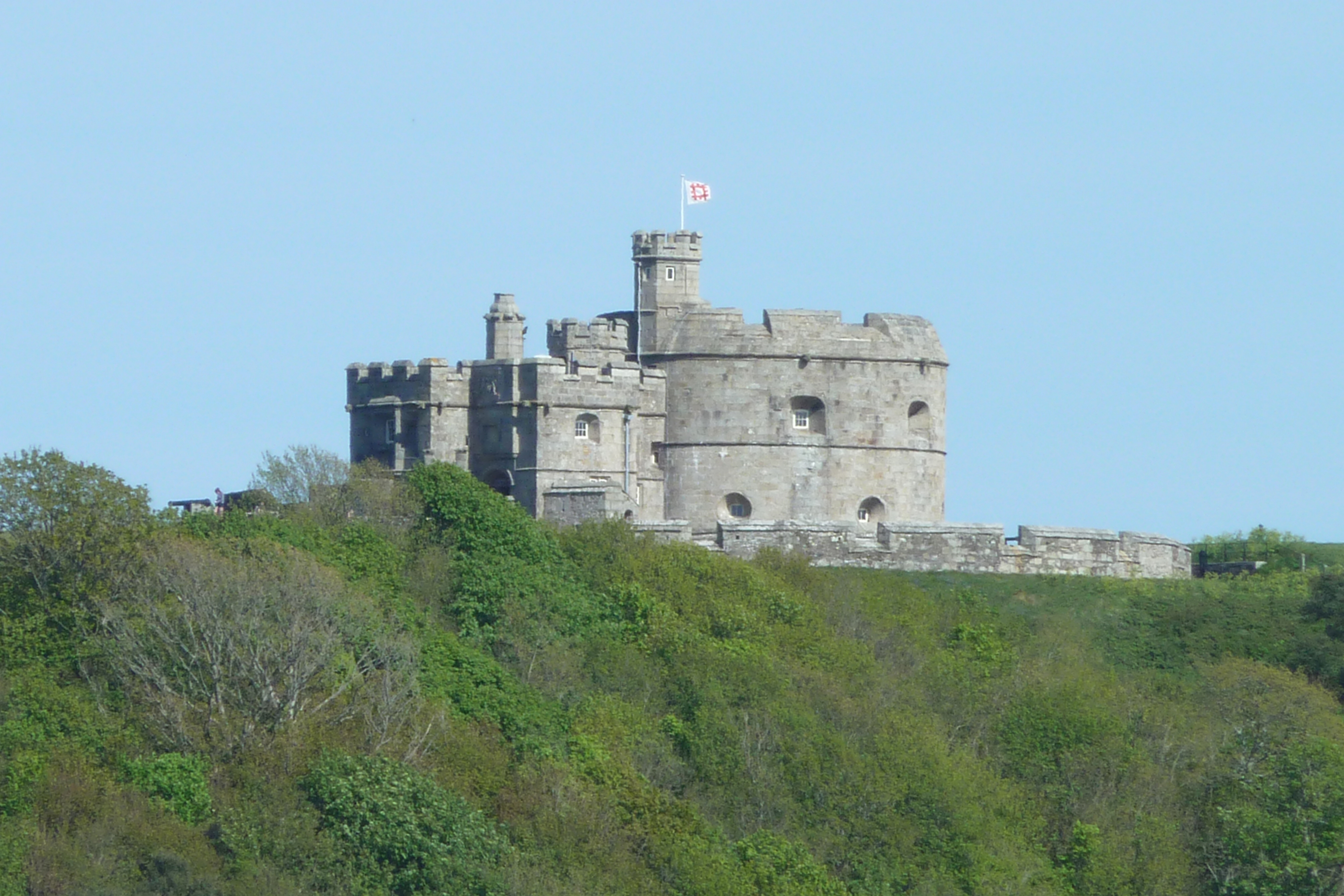
Pendennis Castle, Falmouth, in which as Governor John Arundell withstood a five-month siege by Parliamentary forces in 1646

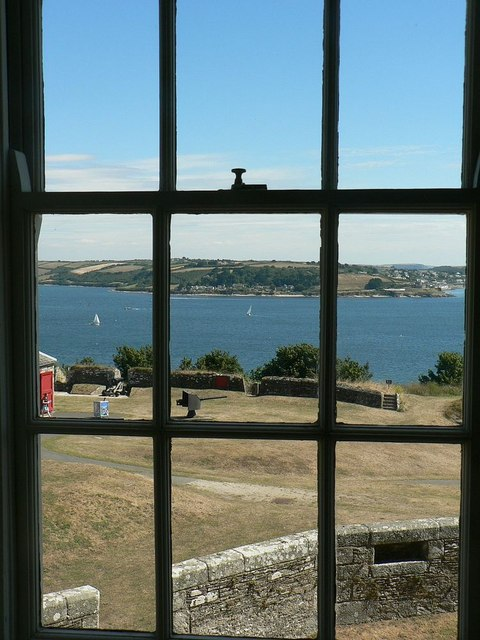
View from the Lodging of the Governor of Pendennis Castle, looking across Carrick Roads towards St Mawes. St Mawes Castle, built by King Henry VIII at the same time as Pendennis, is visible through the right-hand middle pane

In 1597, he was elected Member of Parliament for Mitchell, Cornwall, a pocket borough. He subsequently served as MP for the prestigious county seat of Cornwall in 1601 and 1621 and was Sheriff of Cornwall in 1607. He was elected MP for St Mawes in 1624 and for Tregony in 1628, and sat until 1629 when King Charles I decided to rule without parliament for eleven years.

In April 1640, he was re-elected as MP for Tregony in the Short Parliament. He was not elected to the Long Parliament, unlike his two sons, Richard Arundell, elected for Lostwithiel and John Arundell for Bodmin. Following the outbreak of the Civil War he was a Royalist, remaining loyal to the King, and was present in 1643 at the Royalist victory at the Battle of Braddock Down in Cornwall. In about 1643, he was appointed governor of the royal Pendennis Castle in Cornwall, built by King Henry VIII to guard the entry to Falmouth Harbour. After the Royalist defeat at the Battle of Naseby in June 1645, the Parliamentary army swept through the West Country. Arundell defiantly refused the demand of General Fairfax to submit, and replied to him:

I wonder you demand the castle without authority from His Majesty, which if I should render, I brand myself and my posterity with the indelible character of treason. And having taken less than two minutes resolution, I resolve that I will here bury myself before I deliver up this castle to such as fight against His Majesty, and that nothing you can threaten is formidable to me in respect of the loss of loyalty and conscience.

He maintained a five-month-long siege in heroic circumstances, during which his garrison was reduced by hunger to eating their horses. Finally, he surrendered in August 1646, making Pendennis Castle the last but one to have held out for the King. In 1651, following the establishment of the Commonwealth, he was fined £10,000 by the new government, a large sum later reduced to £2,000, and although his estates were sequestered and let, he was able to retrieve them on payment of a further sum.

== Marriage and children ==
He married Mary Cary, a daughter of George Cary of Clovelly, Devon, Sheriff of Devon in 1587, who constructed the harbour wall at Clovelly, by whom he had children including:

- John Arundell (1613–1644), of Trerice, eldest son, MP from 1640, killed during the Siege of Plymouth in 1644.
- Richard Arundell, 1st Baron Arundell of Trerice (1616–1687), 2nd son. He was raised to the peerage following the Restoration of the Monarchy by King Charles II, partly in recompense for his father's Royalist sentiment and heroic defence of Pendennis Castle. Before his elevation to the peerage, he sat twice as MP for Lostwithiel, April 1640 and November 1640 to January 1644, and twice for Bere Alston, 1660 and 1662–1665.
- Nicholas Arundell (1623–1666), of Gwarnick, near Truro, 3rd son, MP for Truro 1661–6.

== Death ==
Arundell died in December 1654. His eldest son John having died in the war, his lands were inherited by Richard, the second son.

Six years after his death, the family's fortunes were restored in the Restoration of the Monarchy. Richard, who had been active in the Sealed Knot conspiracy, was raised to the peerage by King Charles II as Baron Arundell of Trerice, partly in recognition of his father's service to the Crown.

== Literary portrayals ==
He is a character in the historical novel The Grove of Eagles by Winston Graham, which portrays him sympathetically.

== See also ==
- Arundell family

== Sources ==
- Duffin, Anne & Hunneyball, Paul, biography of Arundell, John (1576–1654), of Trerice, Newlyn, Cornw., published in History of Parliament, House of Commons 1604–1629, ed. Andrew Thrush and John P. Ferris, 2010
- Vivian, Lt.Col. J.L., (Ed.), The Visitations of Cornwall: Comprising the Heralds' Visitations of 1530, 1573 & 1620; with additions by J.L. Vivian, Exeter, 1887, pp. 11 et seq. Pedigree of Arundell of Trerice

Parliament of England
Preceded by Sir Walter Raleigh; Richard Reynell	Member of Parliament for Mitchell; 1597; With: John Carew	Succeeded by George Chudleigh; William Cholmley
Preceded by William Killigrew; Jonathan Trelawny	Member of Parliament for Cornwall; 1601; With: Sir Walter Raleigh	Succeeded by Sir Anthony Rous; Sir Jonathan Trelawny
Preceded by Richard Carew; John St Aubyn	Member of Parliament for Cornwall; 1621–1622; With: Bevil Grenville	Succeeded by Bevil Grenville; William Coryton
Preceded by Edward Wrightington; John Hockmere	Member of Parliament for St Mawes; 1624; With: William Hockmere	Succeeded by Sir James Fullerton; Nathaniel Tomkins
Preceded by Thomas Carey; Sir Robert Killigrew	Member of Parliament for Tregony; 1628–1629; With: Francis Rous	Parliament suspended until 1640
Vacant Parliament suspended since 1629	Member of Parliament for Tregony; 1640; With: John St Aubyn	Succeeded by Sir Richard Vyvyan; John Polwhele
