= John Trelawny (died 1568) =

John Trelawny (or Trelawney) (died 14 October 1568), of Pool in Menheniot, Cornwall, was an English landowner. The son of another John Trelawny of Pool, who had been a co-heir of the Earl of Devon, he was the head of one of Cornwall's leading families. He was also High Sheriff of Cornwall in 1561 and 1567, and a Deputy Lieutenant, and was paid the sum of £6 for not taking the order of knighthood.

Trelawny died in 1568. He had married Anne Reskymer. His eldest son, John (died 1569), was an infant when he inherited his father's estate and lived only a few months afterwards, but the inheritance passed to a second son, Jonathan (later Sir Jonathan, 1568–1604), born after his father's death. His widow was remarried to William Mohun.

Honorary titles
Preceded by Reginald Mohun	High Sheriff of Cornwall; 1561	Succeeded by Richard Roscarrock
Preceded by William Milaton	High Sheriff of Cornwall; 1567	Succeeded by John St Aubyn
