= John Arundell (Royalist) =

Royalist politician and soldier

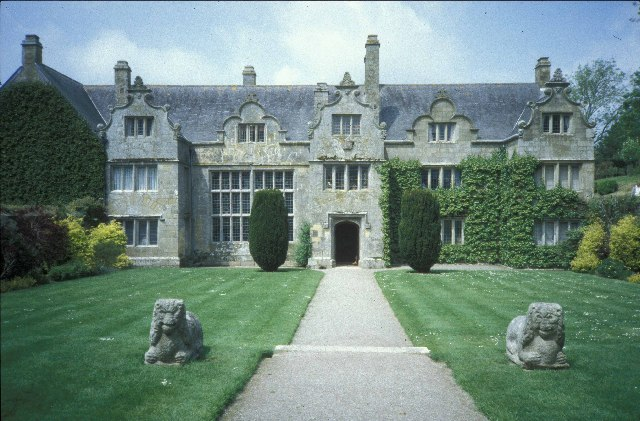
- Trerice House, Cornwall

Member of Parliament for Bodmin
- In office November 1640 – January 1644 (excluded)

Personal details
- Born: c. 1613 Trerice
- Died: 7 November 1644 (aged 31) Plymouth
- Occupation: Politician and soldier

Military service
- Years of service: 1642 to 1644
- Rank: Colonel
- Battles/wars: First English Civil War; Siege of Plymouth

John Arundell of Trerice (1613–1644) was a landowner from Cornwall who sat in the House of Commons from 1640 to 1644. He supported the Royalist cause during the First English Civil War and was killed during the Siege of Plymouth in November 1644.

== Personal details ==
John Arundell was born around 1613 in Trerice, Cornwall, eldest son of Sir John Arundell (1576-1656) and his wife Mary Cary, daughter of George Cary of Clovelley. He was one of six children, the others being Richard, William (died 1643), Francis, Agnes and Mary (1625-1701). The Arundells of Trerice were a junior branch of a Catholic family spread throughout Cornwall, the wealthiest and most significant being the Arundells of St Mawgan.

== Career ==
In November 1640, Arundell was elected Member of Parliament for Bodmin; like other Cornish MPs, he consistently supported the Crown and in May 1641 was one of 59 members named as "betrayers of their country" for voting against the Bill of Attainder for Strafford. Those who voted against the Bill included Sidney Godolphin, John Trevanion, and Nicholas Slanning, all of whom would later be killed fighting for the Royalists.

His movements during the First English Civil War are unclear until he joined the Oxford Parliament in January 1644, when he was disabled from sitting at Westminster"for deserting the service of the House, being in the king's quarters, and adhering that party". He raised a regiment of cavalry which served in the West Country and was killed in a skirmish outside Plymouth in November 1644.

== Sources ==
- Judge, Victor. "Colonel John Arundell's Regiment of Horse". BCW Project.
- Rushworth, John (1721). Historical Collections of Private Passages of State: Volume 4, May 1642. Browne & Son.
- Vivian, JL (1887). The Visitations of Cornwall comprising the Herald's visitations of 1530, 1573 & 1620 (with additions). William Pollard & Co.
- Brunton, D. & Pennington, D. H. (1954) Members of the Long Parliament. London: George Allen & Unwin
- Cobbett, William (1808) Cobbett's Parliamentary history of England, from the Norman Conquest in 1066 to the year 1803. London: Thomas Hansard
