= John Trelawny =

John Trelawny may refer to:

- John Trelawny I (fl. 1397), MP for Bodmin in 1397, father of John Trelawny II
- John Trelawny II (fl. 1413–1421), MP for Cornwall 1413–1421, son of John Trelawny I
- John Trelawny III (fl. 1421–1449), MP for Liskeard 1421 and Lostwithiel 1449
- John Trelawny (died 1563), member of parliament (MP) for Liskeard
- John Trelawny (died 1568), his son, High Sheriff of Cornwall
- Sir John Trelawny, 1st Baronet (1592–1664), Royalist before and during the English Civil War
- John Trelawny (died 1680), MP for West Looe
- John Trelawny (died 1682), MP for West Looe
- John Trelawny (1633–1706), MP for Plymouth
- Sir John Trelawny, 4th Baronet (1691–1756), MP for East Looe, West Looe and Liskeard
- John Salusbury-Trelawny (1816–1885), MP for Tavistock and Eastern Cornwall

== See also ==
- Squire Trelawney (John Trelawney), a supporting character from Robert Louis Stevenson's 1883 novel Treasure Island
