= John Trelawney =

John Trelawney may refer to:

- Squire John Trelawney
- John Trelawny (disambiguation)
