= Pengersick Castle =

Manor house in Breage, Cornwall, England

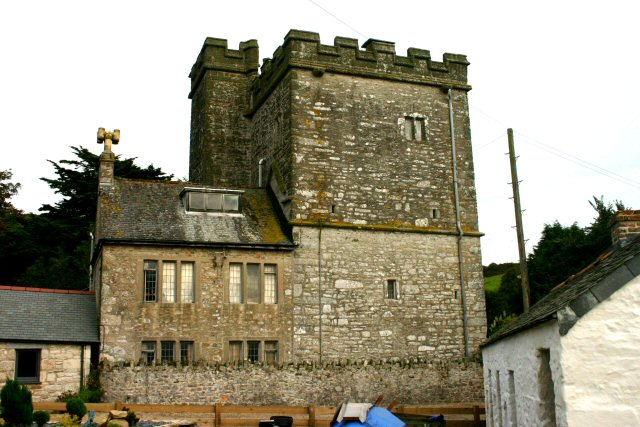

- Location within Cornwall
- 50.10642°N 5.38338°W
- Location: Praa Sands, Breage, Cornwall, England

History
- Built: c.1510

Listed Building – Grade I
- Designated: 10 July 1957
- Reference no.: 1311147

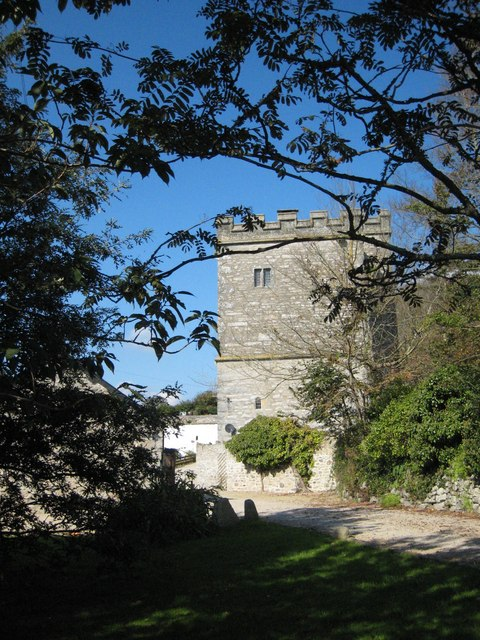
Pengersick Castle; the surviving building dates from 1500. Reputed to be the most haunted castle in Britain

Pengersick Castle is a fortified manor house located between the villages of Germoe and Praa Sands, in the civil parish of Breage, in Cornwall, England. The tower house, which is in the parish of Breage, is a Grade I listed building. Parts of the building date from the early 16th century.

== Description ==
The tower house is of late medieval date and features one of the few towers of its type preserved in Britain. Lysons (1814) wrote as follows: "There are considerable remains of an ancient castellated mansion on this estate, called Pendersick Castle, the principal rooms in which are made use of as granaries and hay-lofts; one of them, which is nearly entire, is wainscotted in panels; the upper part of the wainscot is ornamented with paintings, each of which is accompanied with appropriate verses and proverbs in text hand".

== History ==
It was built in about 1510 by William Worth. The Worth family originated at the manor of Worth in the parish of Washfield in Devon. Elizabeth Worth, a daughter of Thomas Worth (fl.1467), married John Militon of Meavy in Devon.

The Militon family, which originated in Devon, inherited (or otherwise acquired) Pengersick, and enlarged the building. John Milliton of Pengersick Castle became High Sheriff of Cornwall. Sabine Baring-Gould wrote as follows:

"Near Germoe, but nearer the sea is a very fine remnant of a castle, Pengersick. It was erected in the time of Henry VIII by a man named Millaton, probably of Millaton in Bridestow, Devon. He had committed murder and to escape justice he fled his native country and hid himself in the dip of land facing the sea at Pengersick, where he constructed at tower amply protected with means of defence. The basement is furnished with loops for firing upon anyone approaching, and above the door is a shoot for melted lead. The entire building is beautifully constructed. Here Millaton remained in concealment until he died, never leaving his tower for more than a brief stroll. The land had not been purchased in his own name, but in that of his son Job. Job was made governor of Saint Michael's Mount and his son, William, was made sheriff of Cornwall in 1565 and married Honor Godolphin, daughter of Sir William Godolphin".

Pengersick Castle was improved circa 1530 as a fortified manor house using the proceeds of the wreck of a valuable Portuguese ship. Job Militon (f.1547) of Pengersick Castle was Governor of Saint Michael's Mount, Cornwall, in 1547.

== Supernatural legends ==
Rumours of ghosts and devil-worship surround the castle. The ghost of John Milliton is said to haunt the castle. Legend says that he attempted to poison his wife, but she switched goblets with him and the Devil was all too happy to take them both to hell. Historical research has proven some of these stories to be false: no monks were murdered there (although one was assaulted by Henry Pengersick), the supposed plague pits featured in the television programme Most Haunted were located in another part of the castle, and the Black Dog is reported to be a myth created by 19th century smugglers to frighten people away. Additionally, Sir John Milliton died in 1570, and his wife in 1579.

== Cornish wrestling ==
Cornish wrestling tournaments, for prizes, have been held in Pengersick Castle.
