= Reginald Mohun (died 1567) =

English politician

Reginald Mohun (or Mone)
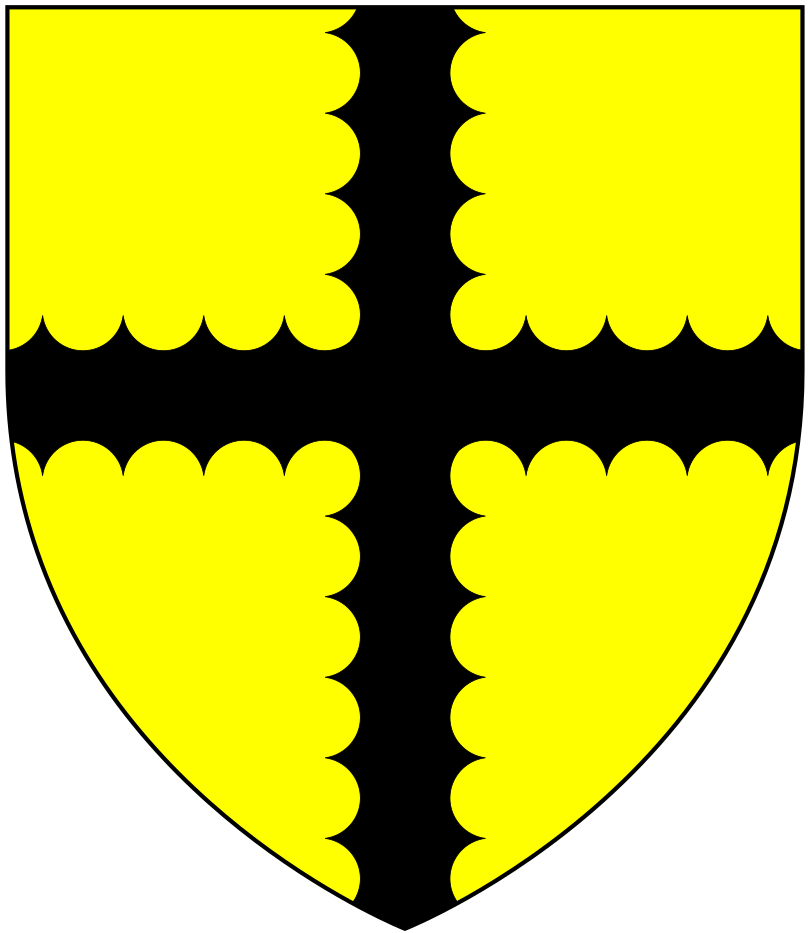
- Arms of Mohun: Or, a cross engrailed sable
- Born: by 1507; Cornwall
- Died: 22 April 1567
- Occupation: Member of Parliament
- Title: High Sheriff of Cornwall
- Term: 1553 and 1560
- Spouse: Jane Mohun (née Trevanion)
- Children: William Mohun
- Parent(s): John Mohun and Anne Mohun (née Coode)

Reginald Mohun or Mone (1507/8 – 22 April 1567), of Hall in the parish of Lanteglos-by-Fowey and of Bodinnick, both in Cornwall, was an English politician.

He was a Member (MP) of the Parliament of England for Newport, Cornwall in 1547, Plympton Erle in October 1553, Helston in November 1554, Rye in 1555 and Liskeard in 1559 and 1563.

Honorary titles
| Preceded by Sir Hugh Trevanion | High Sheriff of Cornwall; 1553 | Succeeded by Sir John Arundell |
| Preceded by John Carminow | High Sheriff of Cornwall; 1560 | Succeeded by John Trelawny |
Parliament of England
| Preceded by Richard Grenville; 1545–47 | Member of Parliament for Newport; 1547–52; With: James Trewynnard 1547–52 | Succeeded by Henry Killigrew; 1553 |
