= John Chamond =

16th-century English politician

Sir John Chamond (by 1488–1544), of Launcells, Cornwall, was an English lawyer and member of parliament.

He was the High Sheriff of Cornwall in 1529 and 1537, Custos Rotulorum of Cornwall in ?–1544 and the member of parliament for Cornwall from 1539 to 1540. His son, Richard Chamond also represented the constituency of Cornwall.
