= John Arundell (admiral) =

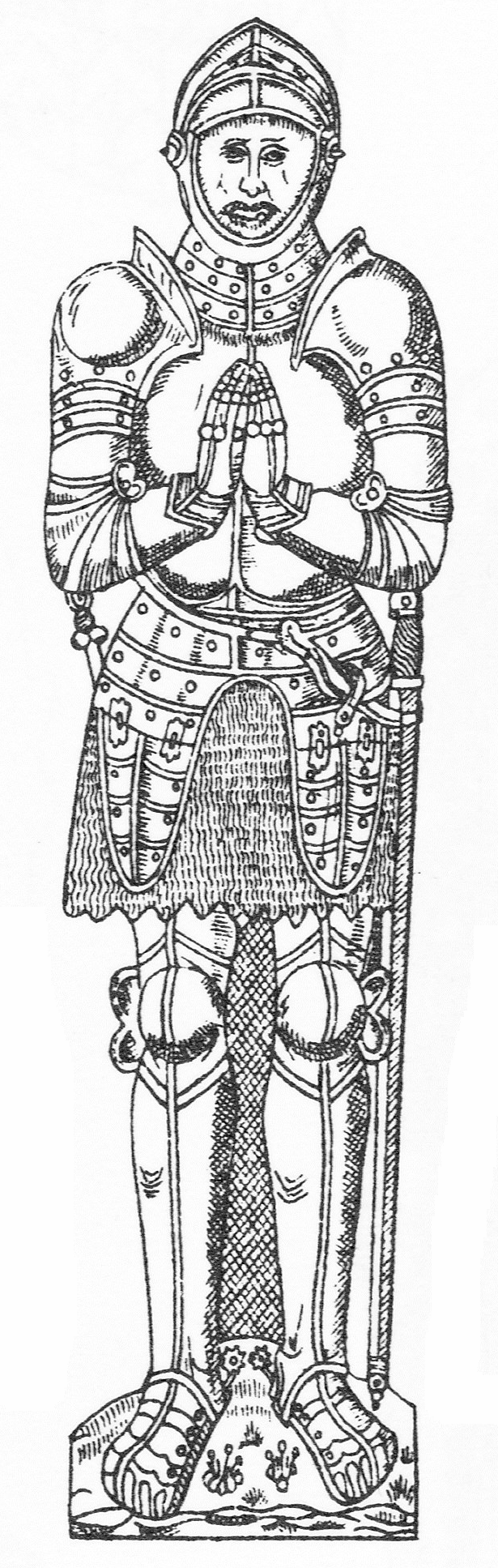
Monumental brass of Sir John Arundell (detail)

Arms of Arundel of Trerice (and of Arundell of Lanherne & Wardour Castle): Sable, six martlets argent.

Sir John Arundell (1495–1561), of Trerice, Cornwall, nicknamed "Tilbury Jack" (or Jack of Tilbury), was a commander of the Royal Navy during the reigns of Kings Henry VIII and Edward VI and served twice as Sheriff of Cornwall.

== Origins ==
Sir John Arundell was the eldest son and heir of Sir John Arundell (1470–1512) of Trerice by his wife Jane Grenville (1474–1551), a daughter of Sir Thomas Grenville (died 1513) KB, lord of the manors of Bideford in Devon and of Stowe in the parish of Kilkhampton in Cornwall, Sheriff of Cornwall in 1481 and in 1486, and an Esquire of the Body to King Henry VII.

== Career ==
Arundell was an Esquire of the Body to King Henry VIII, and was knighted at the Battle of the Spurs in 1513. In 1523 he achieved notability by the capture of a notorious pirate. Under King Edward VI he was Vice-Admiral of the West and served twice as Sheriff of Cornwall, in 1542 and in 1553 at the time of the accession of Queen Mary I.

== Marriages and children ==
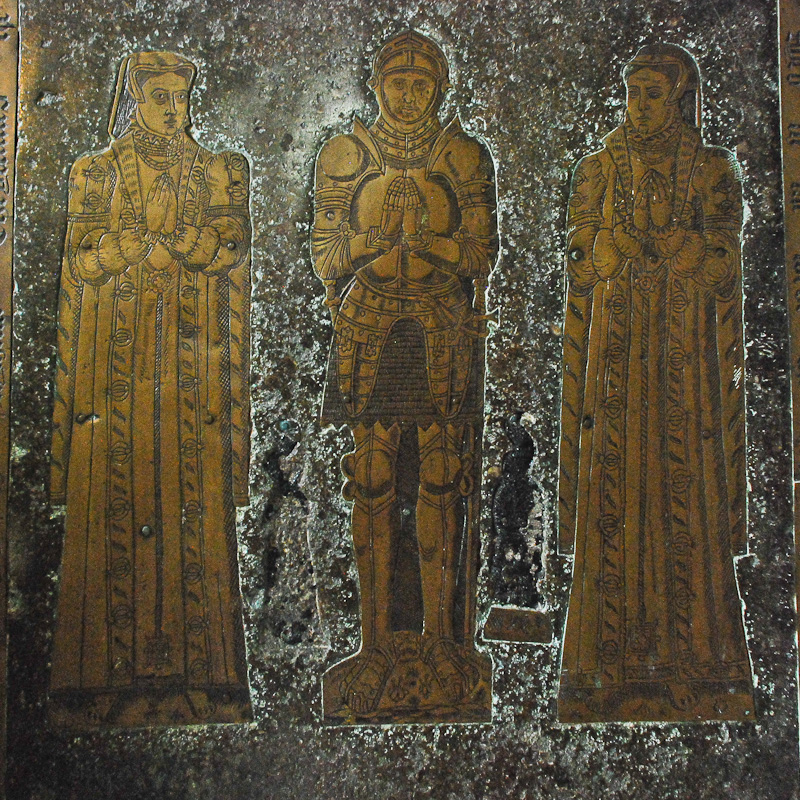
Monumental brass of Sir John Arundell with his two wives (detail), St Andrew's Church, Stratton, Cornwall

Arundell's Estate Act 1609
- Act of Parliament
- Parliament of England
- Long title: An Act for Confirmation of certain Fines levied by John Arundell of Guarnack, Esquire, to John Aundell of Trerise, Esquire, deceased, and for settling of the Manors, Lands Tenements and Hereditaments comprised in the said Fines, upon John Arundell, Esquire, and his Heirs, Son of the said John Arundell deceased.
- Citation: 7 Jas. 1. c. 16 Pr.

Dates
- Royal assent: 23 July 1610

Arundell married twice:

- Firstly at some time before 1512 to Mary Beville (died 1526), daughter and co-heiress of John Beville of Gwarnick, Cornwall, by whom he had children:
  - Roger Arundell, declared a lunatic, who predeceased his father, having married (during his lunacy) Elizabeth Denham, daughter of Robert Tredenham (alias Denham) of Tredenham, Cornwall. His son was John Arundell (1557–1613), who inherited the Beville estate of Gwarnick from his grandmother. He died aged 56 without children and was buried in Lambeth Church, Surrey. His heir to Trerice became his half-uncle John Arundell (died 1580), with whom he had been involved in much litigation, finally settled by a private act of Parliament, Arundell's Estate Act 1609 (7 Jas. 1. c. 16 Pr.), in favour of his uncle.
  - Katherine Arundell, wife of Richard Prideaux (died 1603) of Thuborough in the parish of Sutcombe, Devon. She was heir to her nephew John Arundell (1557–1613) of Gwarnick.
  - Jane Arundell, wife of William Wall
- Secondly in 1526 to Juliana Erisey (or Erissey), daughter of James Erisey (or Erissey) of Erisey, Cornwall and widow of a certain Gourlyn, by whom he had children including:
  - John Arundell (died 1580) of Trerice, father of Sir John Arundell (1576–1654) of Trerice, nicknamed "Jack-for-the-King", a prominent leader of the Royalist cause in Cornwall during the Civil War, partly in recognition of which service his son Richard Arundell, 1st Baron Arundell of Trerice (died 1687) was raised to the Peerage in 1664.

== Illegitimate children ==
Sir John had an illegitimate son Robert Arundell, who founded his own branch of the family at Menadarva, Cornwall, and adopted as his arms the hirondelle arms of Arundell debruised with a bend sinister for bastardy.

== Death and burial ==
Sir John Arundell died in 1561 and was buried at Newlyn East. His monumental brass survives in Stratton Church, Cornwall.

== Monumental brass ==
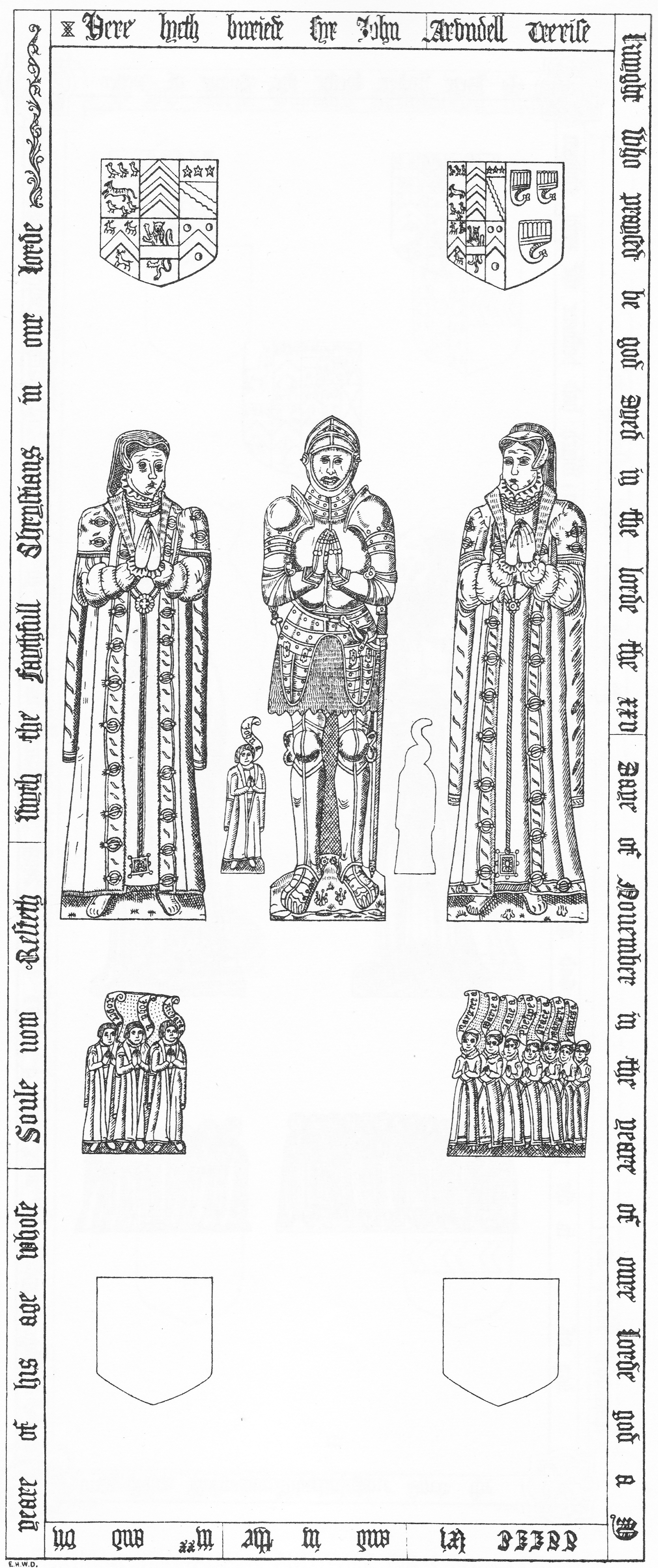
Monumental brass of Sir John Arundell in Stratton Church, Cornwall

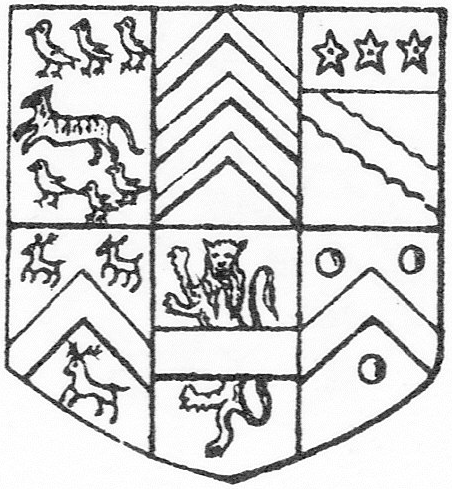
Drawing of arms of Sir John Arundell, with six-quarters, from his brass in Stratton Church

His monumental brasses survive in St Andrew's Church, Stratton, Cornwall. In 1882 a monument was situated at the east end of the north aisle of the church, formed of a chest tomb on top of which was a slab of stone inlaid with several brasses, of which some were then missing, as revealed by matrices. Today only the slab with brasses survives, with some further brasses missing, and stands against the west wall of the church. The brasses show Sir John flanked by his two wives with two groups of his children below and two individual children between himself and each wife. Other brasses are heraldic escutcheons. The inscription on the ledger line of the slab is as follows:

"Here lyeth buriede Syr John Arundell Trerise, Knyght, who praysed be God dyed in the Lorde the xxv daye of November in the yeare of Oure Lorde God a MCCCCC lxi and in the iii^{xx} and vii yeare of his age whose soule now resteth wyth the Faythfull Chrystians in our Lorde"

The date of death inscribed on his monument (25 November 1561) disagrees with that reported in his Inquisition post mortem, namely 26 November 1560, which latter appears to be correct as probate of his will was granted to his widow Juliana on 23 January 1560/1. He is shown dressed in full armour with helmet. Of the four original brass escutcheons only two survive. The one above the wife on his right hand side shows the arms of Arundell with six-quarters:

- 1:Sable, a wolf between six swallows argent (Arundell)
- 2:Sable, three chevronels argent (Lansladron)
- 3:Argent, a bend engrailed sable on a chief gules three mullets or pierced azure (?)
- 4:Argent, a chevron sable between three bucks gules (?)
- 5:Azure, a lion rampant gardant argent debruised by a fess gules (?)
- 6:Sable, a chevron argent between three bezants (Pellor).

The escutcheon above the wife on his left hand side shows the arms of Arundell with the same six-quarters impaling Grenville: Gules, three clarions or. The arms of Arundell are the well-known hirondelle arms but with the addition of a wolf passant between two groups of three swallows. This wolf is believed to be the arms of Trembleigh, in consequence of one of the Arundell's having married the heiress of that family.

== See also ==
- Arundell family

Honorary titles
Preceded by John Arundell	High Sheriff of Cornwall; 1542	Succeeded by Sir Hugh Trevanion
Preceded by Reginald Mohun	High Sheriff of Cornwall; 1554	Succeeded by John Arundell
