= Carnanton House =

Georgian country house in Cornwall, England

- Plas Karnan (Cornish)
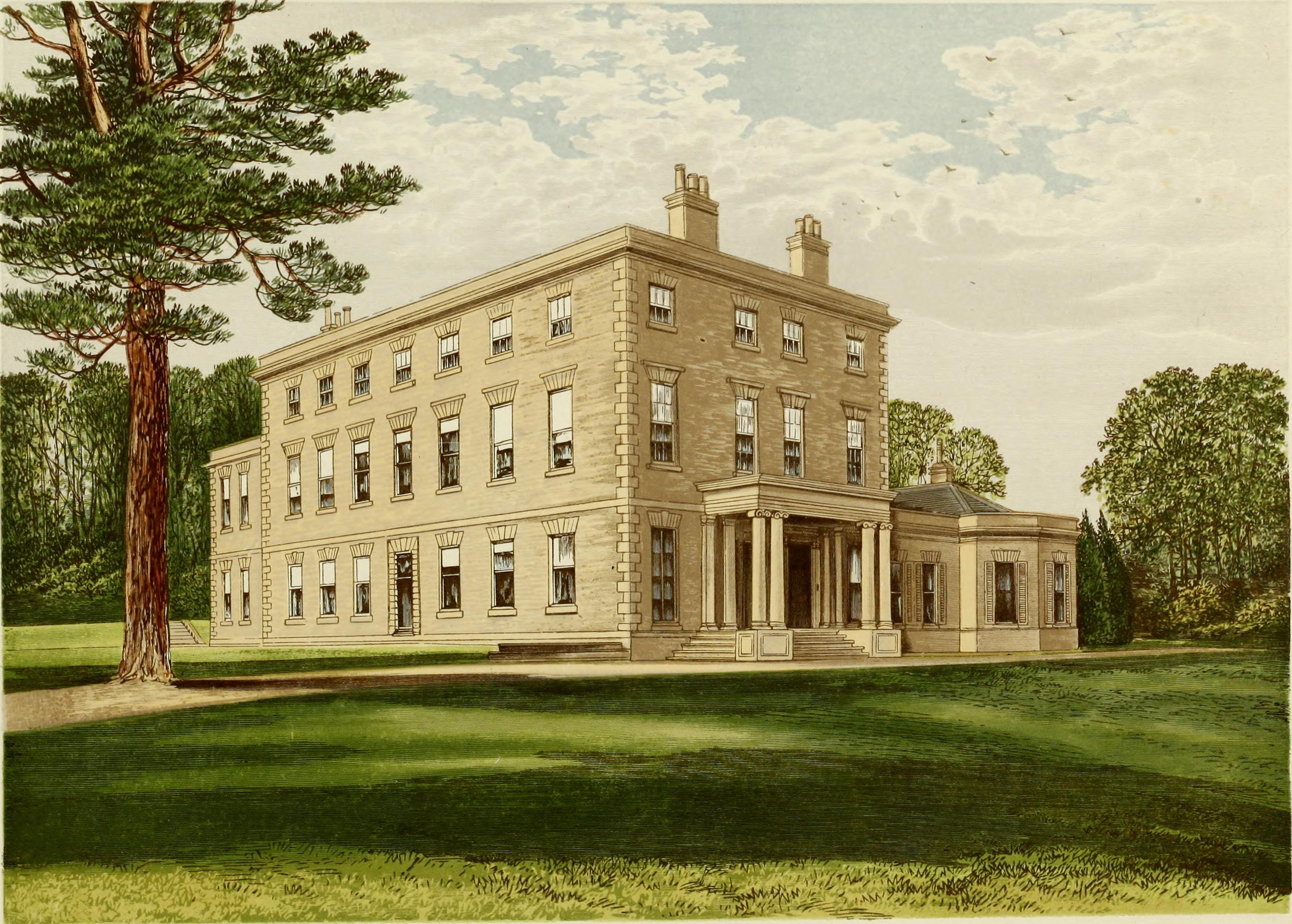
- Carnanton House, 1840

- Location within Cornwall
- 50.443125°N 4.989857°W
- Location: St Mawgan, Cornwall, England

Listed Building – Grade II*
- Official name: Carnanton House
- Designated: 25 August 1987
- Reference no.: 1327395

Carnanton House (Cornish: Plas Karnan) is a Georgian country house in Mawgan-in-Pydar, Cornwall, England. It stands in a wooded estate at the head of the Lanherne valley adjacent to Newquay Airport and is a Grade II* listed building.

== History ==
The house was built circa 1710 and remodelled in the early 1800s with later modifications around 1830 and again later in the century. It is built in three floors, to an originally rectangular floor plan, of coursed slatestone with granite dressings and a hipped slate roof. The original entrance led to a large hall with principal rooms to the right and left with the service rooms to the rear. Around 1830 the entrance was moved to the right side and the room to the right was remodelled to serve as an entrance hall. A single-storey range with three rooms was added to the right of the new entrance front at the same time. Around mid-century the building was extended at was now the rear with more service rooms and a lateral corridor was added. A new chimney stack was added for the kitchen as well. In addition a large wing was built to the rear left that enclosed a small service yard and a one-room wing was added at the left end.

== Owners ==
Built for the Willyams family, the house has descended in that same family for the last 300 years or so, being presently owned by their descendants, the Young-Jamiesons. During that time members of the owning family have served as High Sheriff of Cornwall and as MP for Truro.

The house is currently owned by Paul Young-Jamieson and has no public access, although the grounds are regularly used for organised game bird shooting.

== See also ==
- Edward Brydges Willyams
- William Noy
