= John Arundell (died 1580) =

Arms of Arundel of Trerice (and of Arundell of Lanherne & Wardour Castle): Sable, six martlets argent.

John Arundell (died 15 September 1580), of Trerice in Cornwall, was a Member of Parliament for Mitchell, Cornwall, in 1555 and 1558, and was High Sheriff of Cornwall in 1573–1574.

== Origins ==
He was the second son and heir of Sir John Arundell (1495–1561), of Trerice, nicknamed "Tilbury Jack" (or "Jack of Tilbury"), a commander of the Royal Navy during the reigns of Kings Henry VIII and Edward VI and twice Sheriff of Cornwall, by his second wife Juliana Erisey (or Erissey), daughter of James Erisey (or Erissey) of Erisey and widow of a certain Gourlyn.

== Career ==
He was a retiring figure for much of his life and less celebrated than either his father, "Jack of Tilbury", or his son, Sir John Arundell, nicknamed "Jack for the King". He was twice a Member of Parliament for the pocket borough of Mitchell, Cornwall, in 1555 and 1558, and was High Sheriff of Cornwall in 1573–1574.

== Marriages and children ==
He was married twice:

- Firstly to Catherine Coswarth, daughter of John Coswarth and widow of Alan Hill, by whom he had four daughters:
  - Juliana Arundell (born 1563), who married Richard Carew (1555–1620), the historian of Cornwall, author of the Survey of Cornwall.
  - Alice Arundell (born 1564), wife of Henry Somaster (d. 1606) of Painsford in the parish of Ashprington, Devon.
  - Dorothy Arundell (born 1566), wife of Edward Coswarth of Coswarth.
  - Mary Arundell (born 1568), wife of Oliver Dynham.
- Secondly he married Gertrude Denys, a daughter of Sir Robert Denys (died 1592) of Holcombe Burnell in Devon, by his first wife Mary Mountjoy (a first cousin to Lady Jane Grey and second cousin to Elizabeth I, Mary I and Edward VI through their common ancestor Queen Elizabeth Woodville]), a daughter of William Blount, 4th Baron Mountjoy (1478–1534), by his fourth wife Dorothy Grey, daughter of Thomas Grey, 1st Marquess of Dorset. Gertrude survived her husband and remarried to Edward, Lord Morley. Her will is housed in the National Archives as "Will of Gertrude Morley, Widow of Trerise" 1635. By Gertrude he had at least eight children including:
  - Ann Arundell (born 1574), wife of William Carnsew of Buckelly (Bokelly).
  - John Arundell (born 1575), died in infancy
  - Sir John Arundell (1576 – c. 1656), eldest son and heir, of Trerice, nicknamed "Jack-for-the-King", MP for Cornwall and for Tregony and Governor of Pendennis Castle, Falmouth, during the Civil War
  - Thomas Arundell (born 1577) of Duloe, MP for West Looe, a soldier who served in the Netherlands.
  - Catherine Arundell (born 1580), wife of John St Aubin of Clowans (St Aubyn of Clowance).

== See also ==
- Arundell family

== Sources ==
- Vivian, J. L., ed. (1887). "The Visitations of Cornwall: comprising the Heralds' Visitations of 1530, 1573 & 1620"; with additions by J. L. Vivian. Exeter: W. Pollard, p. 12, Pedigree of Arundell of Trerice
- Burke's Extinct Peerage (London: Henry Colburn & Richard Bentley, 1831)
- Willis, Browne (1750). Notitia Parliamentaria, Part II: A Series or Lists of the Representatives in the several Parliaments held from the Reformation 1541, to the Restoration 1660 ... London. p. 1.

Parliament of England
Preceded by Paul Stamford; Andrew Tussard	Member of Parliament for Mitchell; 1555–1558; With: John Thomas 1555; Thomas Gardiner 1558	Succeeded by Drue Drury; Robert Colshill
Honorary titles
Preceded by Peter Courtney	High Sheriff of Cornwall; 1574	Succeeded by John Bevill
