= John Militon =

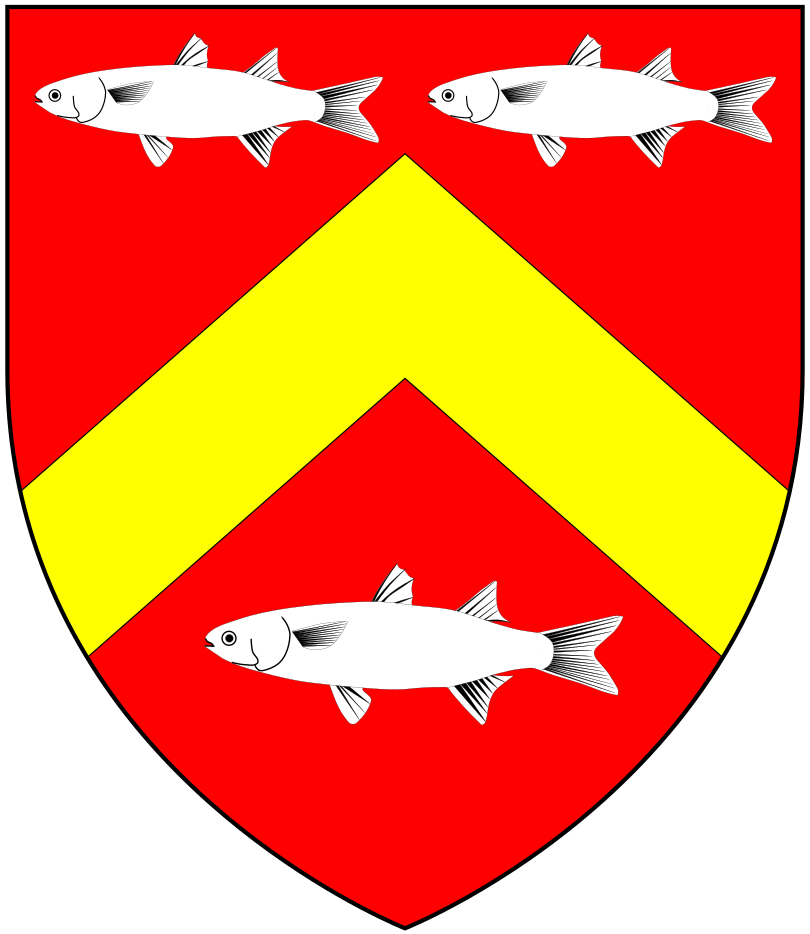
Canting arms of Militon: Gules, a chevron or between three millets hauriant argent

John Militon (died 1549; alias Job Militon) of Pengersick Castle in the parish of Breage in Cornwall, was Governor of Saint Michael's Mount, Cornwall, in 1547.

== Career ==
The Militon family, which originated in Devon, inherited (or otherwise acquired) Pengersick, and enlarged the building. Sabine Baring-Gould (1899) wrote as follows:

"Near Germoe, but nearer the sea is a very fine remnant of a castle, Pengersick. It was erected in the time of Henry VIII by a man named Millaton, probably of Millaton in Bridestow, Devon. He had committed murder and to escape justice he fled his native country and hid himself in the dip of land facing the sea at Pengersick, where he constructed at tower amply protected with means of defence. The basement is furnished with loops for firing upon anyone approaching, and above the door is a shoot for melted lead. The entire building is beautifully constructed. Here Millaton remained in concealment until he died, never leaving his tower for more than a brief stroll. The land had not been purchased in his own name, but in that of his son Job (sic). Job was made governor of Saint Michael's Mount and his son, William, was made sheriff of Cornwall in 1565 and married Honor Godolphin, daughter of Sir William Godolphin".

During the reign of Henry VIII, John's father had purchased The manor of Pengersick. On 4 February 1534 John Militon and his son William obtained a grant from the Abbess of Syon Monastery (dissolved in 1539) of a 30-year farm of Saint Michael's Mount, on condition of maintaining an arch-priest and two other priests. The Militons are mentioned frequently in this connection in the "Minister's Accounts of Cornwall".

John Militon was made governor of St. Michael's Mount in the year 1547, in the room of Sir Humphrey Arundell (c. 1513 – 1550), who was later executed for his part in the Prayer Book Rebellion of 1549.

== Marriage and children ==
Militon married and had a son and heir, William (died 1 June 1571), who became Sheriff of Cornwall in 1565, and married Honor Godolphin, a daughter of Sir William Godolphin of Godolphin, Cornwall. Of William and his wife, Sabine Baring-Gould relates as follows:

According to local legend, William Millaton lived a cat and dog live with his wife Honor. They hated each other with a deadly hate and at length each severally resolved that this incompatible union must end. William Millaton said to his wife, "Honor, we have lived in wretchedness too long. Let us resolve in a reconciliation, forget the past, and begin a new life." "Most certainly do I agree," said she. "And," continued William, "as a pledge of our reunion, let us have a feast tonight." So a banquet was spread in Pengersick Castle for them twain and none others. And when they had well eaten, William said, "Let us drink to our reunion." "I will drink if you will drink," said she. Then he drained his glass, and after that, she drained hers. With a bitter laugh she said, "William, you have but three minutes to live. Your cup was poisoned." "And you," he retorted, "have but five, for yours was poisoned also." "It is well," said Honor; "I am content. I shall have two minutes in which to triumph over your dead carcass, and spurn it with my foot."

William had a son and heir apparent also named William, who died at sea without children shortly before his father's death, when William's six daughters therefore became his co-heiresses. They married into the families of Erisey, Lanyon, Trefusis, Arundel, Bonython, and Abbot of Hartland Abbey.

== Sources ==
- Inquisition post mortem of William I Militon, taken at Exeter Castle, 4 October 13 Eliz (1571)
- Vivian, J. L., ed., The Visitations of Cornwall: comprising the Heralds' Visitations of 1530, 1573 & 1620; with additions by J.L. Vivian , Exeter, 1887, published by W. Pollard. (Index pp. 643–672), Index, "Milliton", p. 660
