= John Williams (rugby union, born 1927) =

England international rugby union player

- Full name: John Michael Williams
- Born: 24 August 1927 Penzance, Cornwall, England
- Died: 6 September 2000 (aged 73) Budock, Cornwall, England
- School: Rugby School
- University: University of Cambridge

Rugby union career
- Position: Centre
International career
Years	Team	Apps	(Points)
1951	England	2	(0)

John Michael Williams (24 August 1927 – 6 September 2000) was an English international rugby union player.

Williams was born and raised in Penzance, Cornwall. He attended Rugby School.

A hard-running centre, Williams gained a Cambridge blue in 1949 and was club captain of the Cornish Pirates. He was capped twice for England in the 1951 Five Nations, against Ireland at Lansdowne Road and Scotland at Twickenham.

Williams was a solicitor turned industrialist and spent his later years living in Budock. He held the position of High Sheriff of Cornwall for 1990 and also served a period as President of Cornwall RFU.

== See also ==
- List of England national rugby union players
