= Jonathan Trelawny (High Sheriff of Cornwall) =

English Member of Parliament

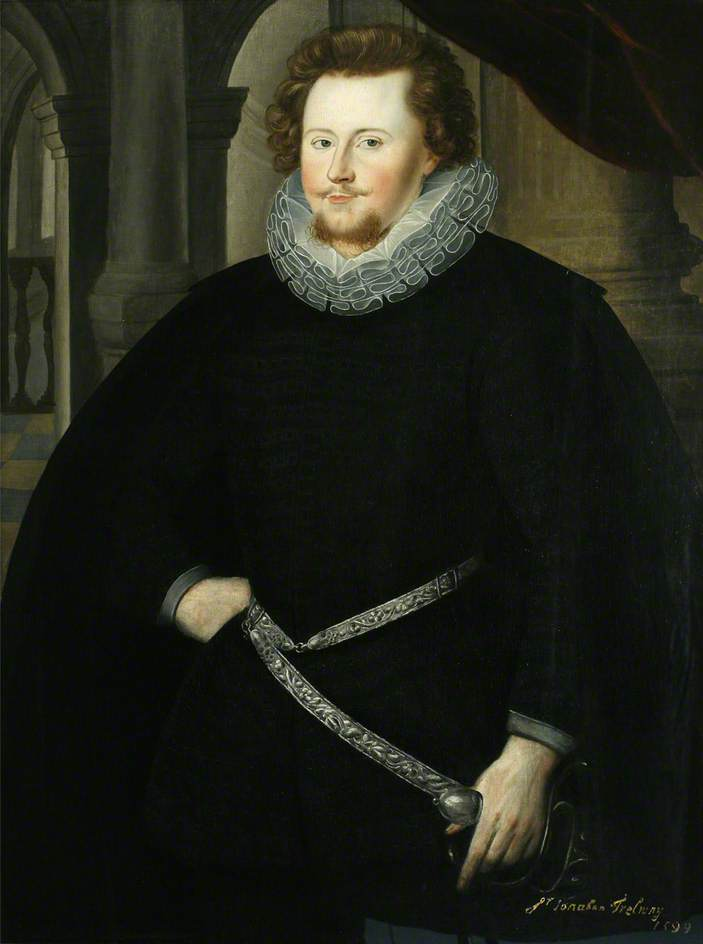
Sir Jonathan Trelawny in 1599

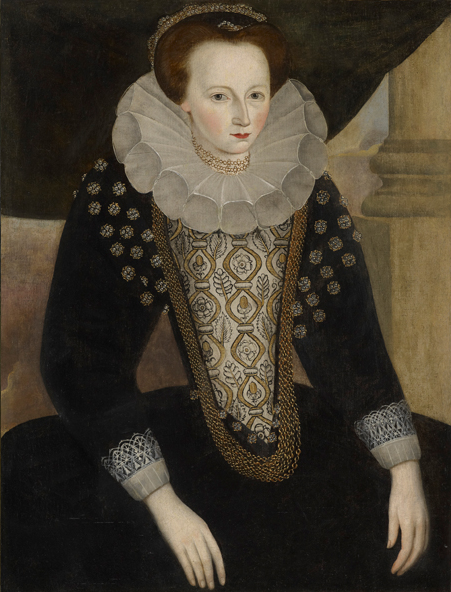
Elizabeth Lady Trelawny (née Killigrew)

Sir Jonathan Trelawny (17 December 1568 – 21 June 1604), of Pool in Menheniot, Cornwall, was an English Member of Parliament.

== Biography ==
Trelawny was the posthumous younger son of John Trelawny of Pool (who had been High Sheriff of the county); his elder brother died in infancy and he inherited the estate. He entered Parliament as member for Liskeard, representing that borough in three parliaments, and subsequently also represented Cornwall in the Parliaments of 1597 and 1604. On one occasion he was sent to the Tower of London for losing his temper during a parliamentary debate where he "dealt his opponent, Mr Ashe, a thundering box to his ear" and "flashed his sword".

He was High Sheriff of Cornwall in 1595 and was knighted in 1597; he was also Recorder of Liskeard and Steward of the borough of West Looe. He died on 22 June 1604, while Parliament was in session. The Journal of the House of Commons records that the House was informed of his death the following day: he "being suddenly suffocated with a flux of blood, which came by breaking a vein with vehement coughing, and was said to found sick and dead within quarter of an hour"; the House of Commons voted to attend his funeral at St Clement Danes, an unusual mark of respect.

In 1600, Sir Jonathan purchased the manor of Trelawney or Trelawn in Pelynt from the Crown, and moved his residence there from Pool. (This was not the same Trelawney from which the family originally took its name, which was in the parish Altarnun, a dozen miles away, and where they had not lived for some centuries.) He had married Elizabeth Killigrew, daughter of Sir Henry Killigrew, which made him a distant connection of Sir Robert Cecil, whose aunt Catherine Cooke was Killigrew's first wife, and Trelawny ensured that the Parliamentary seats he controlled at Liskeard were at Cecil's disposal in 1597 and 1601. Their eldest son, John (1592–1664), was created a baronet in 1628. To his second son, Edward, he left the estate of Coldrenick.

Parliament of England
Preceded by Peter Edgcumbe; Edward Denny	Member of Parliament for Liskeard; 1586–1593; With: Richard Edgcumbe 1586–1587; John Jackson 1588–1589; George Wray 1593	Succeeded by Henry Nevill; Edward Trelawny
Preceded by Peter Edgcumbe; William Bevill	Member of Parliament for Cornwall; 1597–1598; With: William Killigrew	Succeeded by Sir Walter Raleigh; John Arundell
Preceded by Sir Walter Raleigh; John Arundell	Member of Parliament for Cornwall; 1604; With: Sir Anthony Rous	Succeeded by Sir Anthony Rous; Sir William Godolphin
Honorary titles
Preceded by Thomas Lower	High Sheriff of Cornwall; 1595	Succeeded by Charles Trevanion
