= John Trelawny (died 1563) =

Cornish politician

John Trelawny (or Trelawney) (c. 1504 – 29 September 1563) was a Cornish Member of Parliament. The son of Walter and Isabella Trelawny of Poole-in-Menheniot, Cornwall, he was High Sheriff of Cornwall in 1547 and 1560. He represented Liskeard in the first Parliament of 1553 and Cornwall from 1559 until his death. He married twice; his son by his marriage to Margery Lamelion, John, was his heir and also served as High Sheriff.

== Notes ==
Honorary titles
| Preceded by Thomas St Aubyn | High Sheriff of Cornwall; 1547 | Succeeded by Job Milaton |
Parliament of England
| Preceded by John Arundell; John Polwhele | Member of Parliament for Cornwall; 1559–1563; With: Richard Chamond; Peter Edgcumbe | Succeeded by Richard Grenville; William Mohun |
