= Truthan =

House in St. Erme, Cornwall, England, UK

Truthan Manor is a house near St Erme in Cornwall, England, UK. The current house was built around 1687.

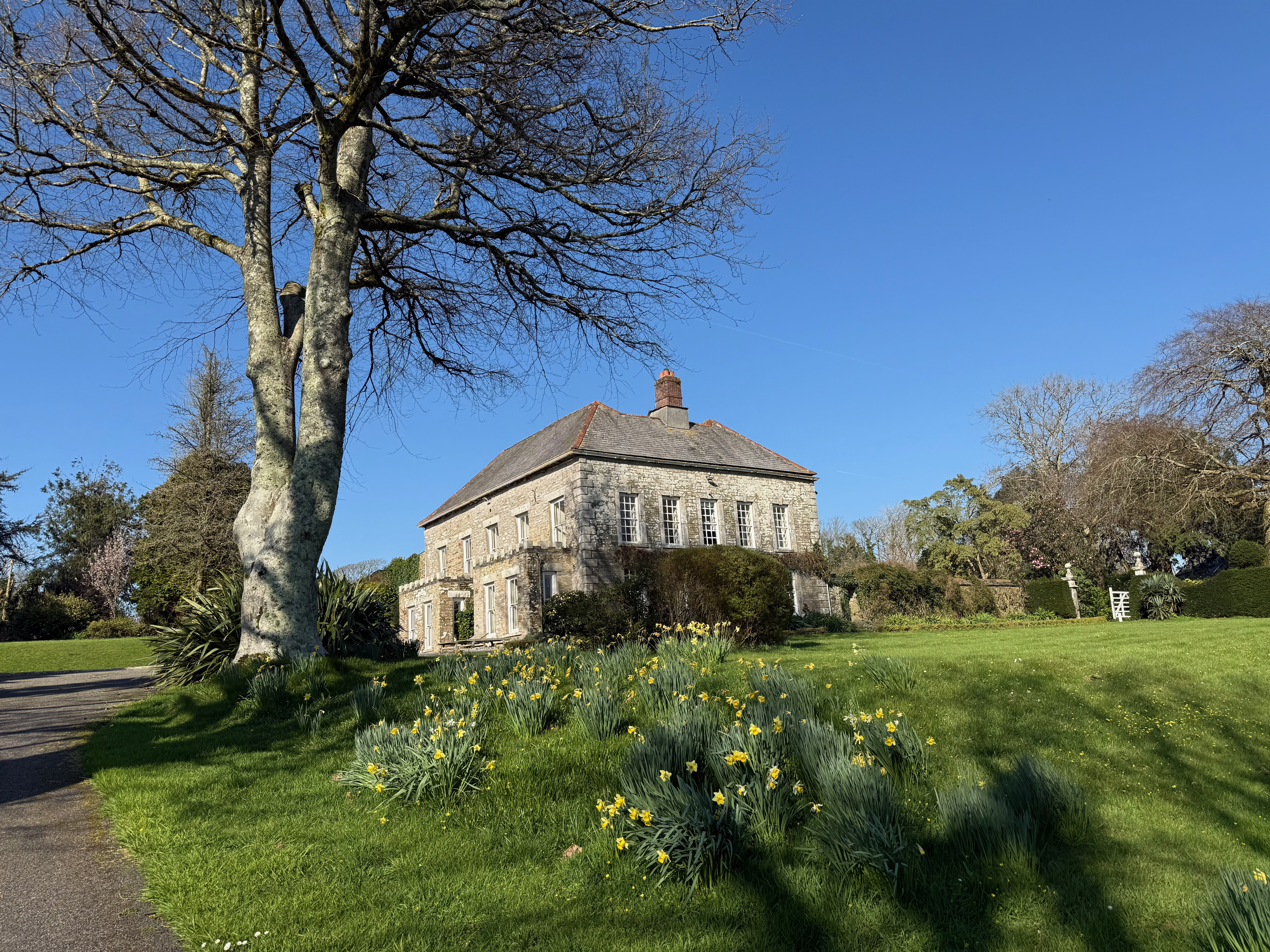
Truthan Manor, St Erme

== History ==
Truthan formed part of the ancient lands of the Bishop of Exeter’s manor of Cargoll (St Newlyn East), divided into the Bishop’s own lands, common moor, parks and chases, and bartons like Truthan (small gentry estates worked for or by a lord rather than by an organised peasant community). From the 16th century such properties were typically seats of County 'gentry' families - Truthan was home to several High Sheriffs of Cornwall, including Humphrey Borlase (1686-8), John Williams (1705-6), Edward Collins I (1802-3) and Edward Collins II (1830-31).

Walter Borlase, a Cornish landowner and a local administrator during the reign of Henry VIII acquired the land on which Truthan in the 16th century. A member of the Borlase family of St Wenn, he served as a commissioner and assessor concerned with the lands and stannaries of the Duchy of Cornwall. The lands that he acquired at Treludderow, part of the parish of St Newlyn East, ha been held by the Bishop of Exeter as part of the Manor of Cargoll, but were confirmed to him and the heirs of his body in 1541. This included the barton of Truthan.

Around the time of the English Civil War the Borlases leased Truthan to John Jago, who then arranged sequestration of the Borlase lands during the Long Parliament (the Borlases having taken the Royalist side). On restoration Nicholas Borlase passed the estate to his eldest son, Humphrey Borlase (1634-1709), MP for Mitchell from 1673 to 1678, who then rebuilt the house. The Parochial History of Cornwall states; "Mr Borlase built here a very convenient new house, and made it the place of his constant residence."Humphrey Borlase is recorded as being 'of Truthan' when High Sheriff.

The estate passed from Humphrey Borlase to the Williams family in around 1700, and to the Collins family some time around 1770. It remained in the Collins family till 1919.

== Architecture ==
The house has some early C19 additions, but is fundamentally the house that Humphrey Borlase built. It consists of a main square granite house and a service wing, whose walls may be of earlier date. The interior includes some C18 panelling.

The house has been listed Grade II on the National Heritage List for England since May 1967. The gate piers and well house to the house are also individually Grade II listed. A cottage and an annex in the service area of the house is also listed Grade II.
