= William Mohun =

16th-century English politician

Arms of Mohun: Or, a cross engrailed sable

Sir William Mohun (ca. 1540 – 6 April 1588) of Hall in the parish of Lanteglos-by-Fowey and of Boconnoc, both in Cornwall, was a Member of Parliament.

== Origins ==
He was the son and heir of Reginald Mohun (1507/8–1567) of Hall and Boconnoc, by his wife Jone Trevanion, daughter of Sir William Trevanion and sister of Sir Hugh Trevanion. His great-grandfather William Mohun of Hall had married Elizabeth Courtenay, one of the greatest heiresses of her time, one of the four eventual co-heiresses of Edward Courtenay, 1st Earl of Devon (1527–1556) the last of the mediaeval Courtenay Earls of Devon. The Mohun share of the Courtenay inheritance included Boconnoc in Cornwall and Okehampton Castle in Devon, and other remnants of the feudal barony of Okehampton, one of the earliest possessions of the Courtenays.

=== Ancient origins ===
The Mohuns of Hall were a junior branch of the Mohun family, and were descended from John Mohun (d. 1322) of Dunster Castle in Somerset, feudal baron of Dunster by his wife Anne Tiptoft.

== Career ==
He entered Lincoln's Inn in 1559 to study law. He was elected Member of Parliament for St Germans (1563–1567) and Cornwall (2 April 1571 – 29 May 1571). He was appointed Sheriff of Cornwall for 1572 and 1578, knighted in 1583, and then re-elected MP for Cornwall again in 1584 and 1586. He served as Lord Lieutenant of Cornwall from 8 August 1586 to 7 December 1587.

== Marriages and children ==
He married twice:

- Firstly to Elizabeth Horsey, the daughter of Sir John Horsey (d. 1564), MP, by whom he had two sons and one daughter including:
  - Reginald Mohun, eldest son and heir. In 1628 his descendant John Mohun (1595–1641) was elevated to the peerage by King Charles I as Baron Mohun of Okehampton, in recognition of his ancestor having inherited Okehampton Castle as his share of the Courtenay inheritance.
- Secondly he married Anne Reskimer, a daughter and co-heiress of William Reskimer and widow of John Trelawny (d. 1568) of Menheniot, by whom he had a further three sons and two daughters. Anne survived him and remarried thirdly to Sir William Lower.

== Death and burial ==
He died in 1588.
