= Vice-Admiral of the West =

The historical title Vice-Admiral of the West is sometimes applied to holders of the crown appointment Vice-Admiral of the Coast of counties in the South West of England.

The duties of a Vice-Admiral of the Coast were to control the shipping (especially piracy) around a maritime county's coast and organise defence on land and at sea. He also acted as a local judge to deal with maritime matters.

It is not entirely clear if the role of Vice-Admiral of the West was in fact separate or additional to the role either Vice-Admiral of the Coast of Cornwall or Vice-Admiral of the Coast of Devon. Appointees to both these posts seem to have been described in writings after their deaths as Vice-Admiral of the West despite appearing appointed to their counties in contemporary papers.

The following are said to have been Vice-Admirals of the West:

- Sir John Arundell of Trerice - said to have held the post under Edward VI
- Sir John Pole (the great-great-great grandfather of William Pole and great-great-great-great grandfather of Sir William Pole, the noted antiquary of Devon) held the post of Vice-Admiral of the West of England
- Sir Arthur Champernowne - Vice-Admiral of the Devon Coast 1562 - 1577
- Sir Walter Raleigh - Vice-Admiral of the Devon Coast 1586 - 1603

In his History of the Royal Navy, Nicholas Harris Nicolas refers to both a Vice-Admiral of the West, whose command extended "from the Foreland of Thanet towards all the coasts of the south-west", and a Vice-Admiral of the North, whose command extended "from the said Foreland towards the North and East".

== See also ==
- Vice-Admiral of the Coast
