= John Beville =

English politician (died 1426)

John Beville (died 13 January 1426) was an English politician. He sat as MP for Cornwall in 1386.

== Political career ==
He also served as commissioner of arrest in Cornwall in February 1388; commissioner of array in April 1418; commissioner to treat for loans in November 1419, and January 1420; Sheriff of Cornwall from 1 December 1396 till 3 November 1397, in Devon from 22 April till 22 October 1404, and 1 December 1415 till 30 November 1416; and justice of the peace for Cornwall on 3 February 1416 and in February 1422.

== Family ==
He was the son and heir of John Beville of Woolston possibly by his first wife Cecily. By 1409, he married Agnes (c. 1386 – 17 March 1442), the daughter and co-heiress of Thomas Beaupyne of Bristol, and widow of John Bluet of Grindham, Somerset. They had one son and one daughter.
