= Thomas St Aubyn =

English politician

Thomas St Aubyn (c. 1578 – 1637) was an English politician.

He was the son of Thomas St Aubyn of Clowance in Cornwall and studied at Queen's College, Oxford and the Middle Temple.

He was elected the MP for St Ives in the Parliament of 1601 alongside Thomas Barton and MP for Grampound in the Addled Parliament (1614).

On 13 April, 1615, in Milor, Devonshire, England, he married Katherine, the daughter of John Bonython of Carclew with whom he had two sons and a daughter. These were Henry St. Aubyn, died before 1637, Thomas St. Aubyn, died about 16 February 1623 and Zenoba St. Aubyn.
