= Siege of Plymouth =

Battle of the English Civil War

- Part of First English Civil War
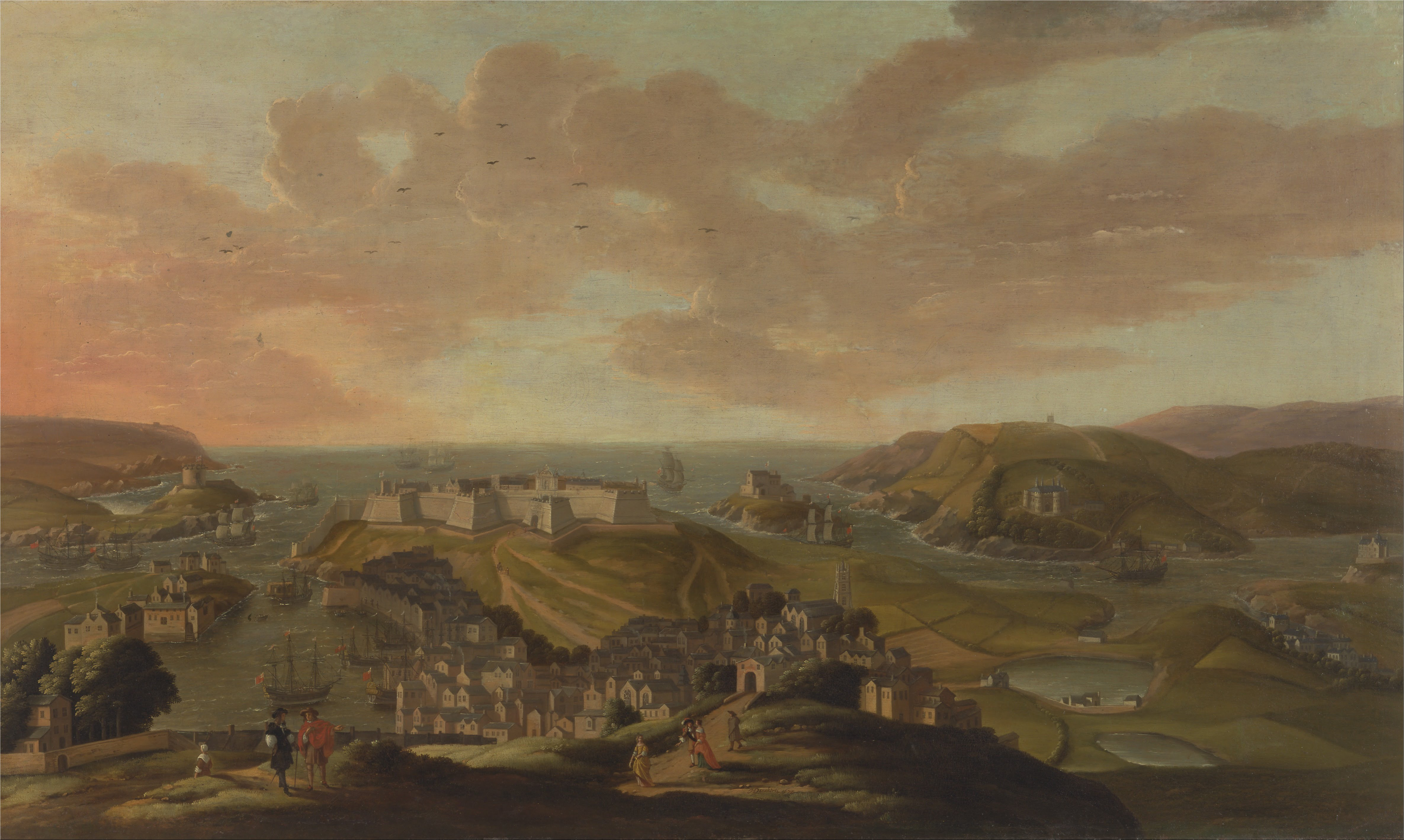
- Contemporary map of Plymouth port
Date	August 1642 – February 1646
Location	Plymouth, Devon
Result	Parliamentarian victory

Belligerents
Royalists	(Kingdom of England) Parliamentarians

Commanders and leaders
Prince Maurice; Sir Richard Grenville	William Ruthven; James Wardlaw; William Gould; Colonel Martin

Strength
Unknown	2,500

The Siege of Plymouth, August 1642 to February 1646, took place during the First English Civil War, when Royalist forces besieged the Parliamentarian-held port of Plymouth in Devon.

For much of this period, the West Country was a Royalist stronghold, leaving Plymouth isolated, but control of the sea allowed the garrison to be easily resupplied.

This meant siege operations were largely restricted to a land blockade, with the exception of two attempts to capture the town, from October to December 1643, and January to February 1645. Plymouth was finally relieved in February 1646.

== Background ==
At the start of the fighting in August 1642, Parliamentarian forces secured most of southern and western England, including the ports of Plymouth and Exeter. Along with control of the Royal Navy, this prevented Royalist efforts to import arms and men from Europe. Soon after, Plymouth was cut off by Royalist forces, based in nearby Plymstock, who blocked the import of supplies by land. With the population rising to over 10,000 due to an influx of refugees, typhus and other diseases rapidly spread throughout the town, but the Royalists lacked adequate siege equipment. In addition, the defence was led by Colonel William Ruthven and a contingent of experienced Scots mercenaries, whose ship stopped in Plymouth to pick up supplies in early October, and had promptly been hired by the town council.

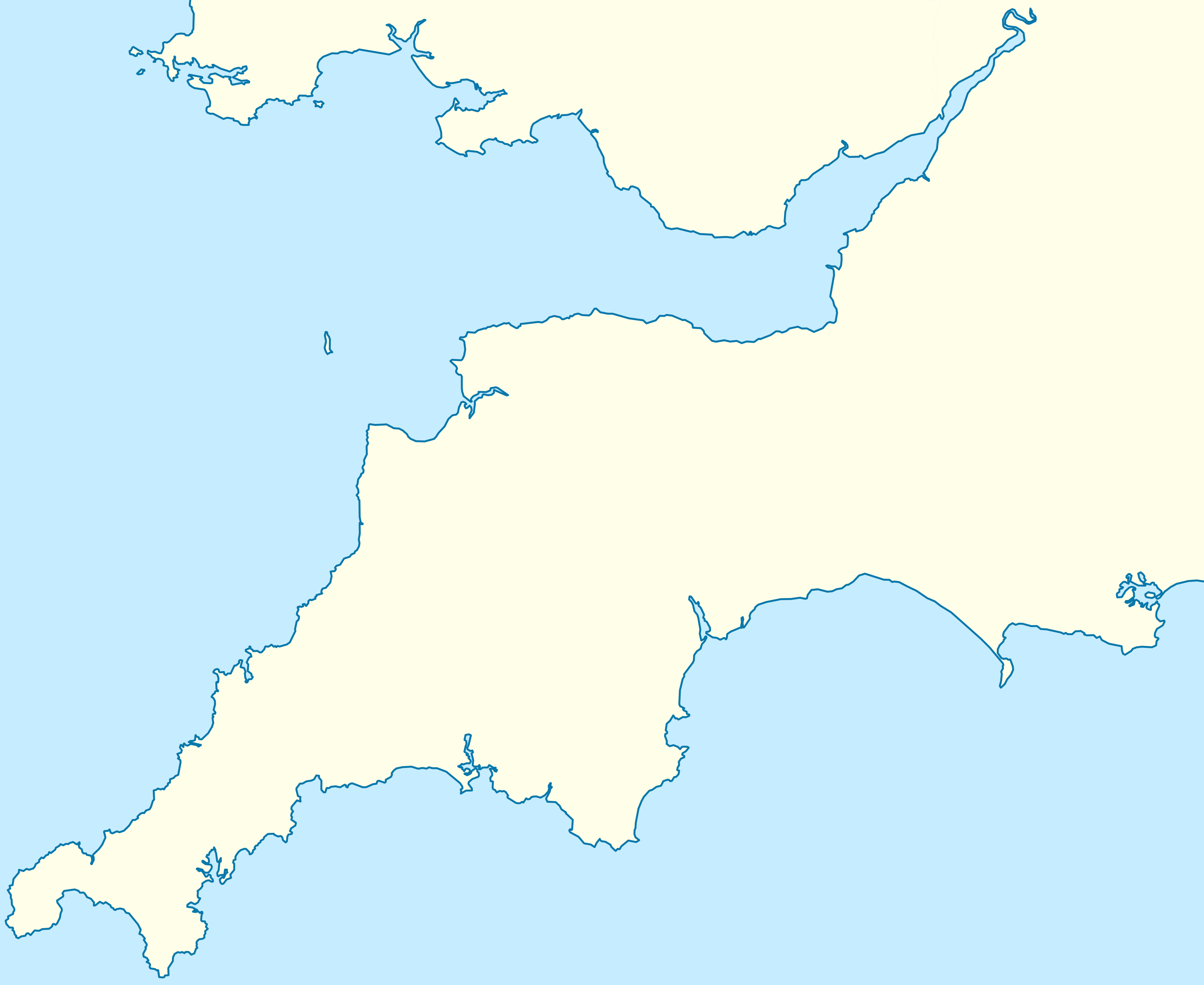
Key locations, Western England, 1642 to 1646

Parliament's control of the sea allowed Plymouth to be resupplied as needed. In addition, the garrison strengthened their land defences by building strongpoints on high ground to the north at Lipson, Holiwell, Maudlyn, Pennycomequick and New Worke. Along with other forts at Lipson Mill and Stonehouse, this meant the town could not be fired on from the land, making its capture very difficult.

On 13 July 1643, Royalists under Sir Ralph Hopton decisively defeated the Parliamentarian Army of the Western Association at Roundway Down. On 26 July, Prince Rupert stormed Bristol, gaining the second largest city in Britain, along with a potential landing point for reinforcements from Ireland. After Exeter surrendered to Prince Maurice on 4 September, Plymouth was left as the main Parliamentarian enclave in the West Country.

Royalist success led to a series of Parliamentarian defections, including Sir Alexander Carew, commander of a key defensive position on Drake's Island. In August, Carew ordered his men to fire on a Parliamentarian warship entering the harbour. They refused, and he allegedly only escaped lynching when the ship's captain intervened. Taken to London, Carew was executed for treason in December 1644.

== 1643 Siege ==
Rather than attacking Plymouth immediately, Prince Maurice first captured Dartmouth, which held out until early October. Although Royalist cavalry imposed a tight land blockade on 15 September, siege operations did not begin until mid-October, allowing London to send 500 reinforcements, under Colonel James Wardlow, an experienced professional who replaced Ruthven as garrison commander.

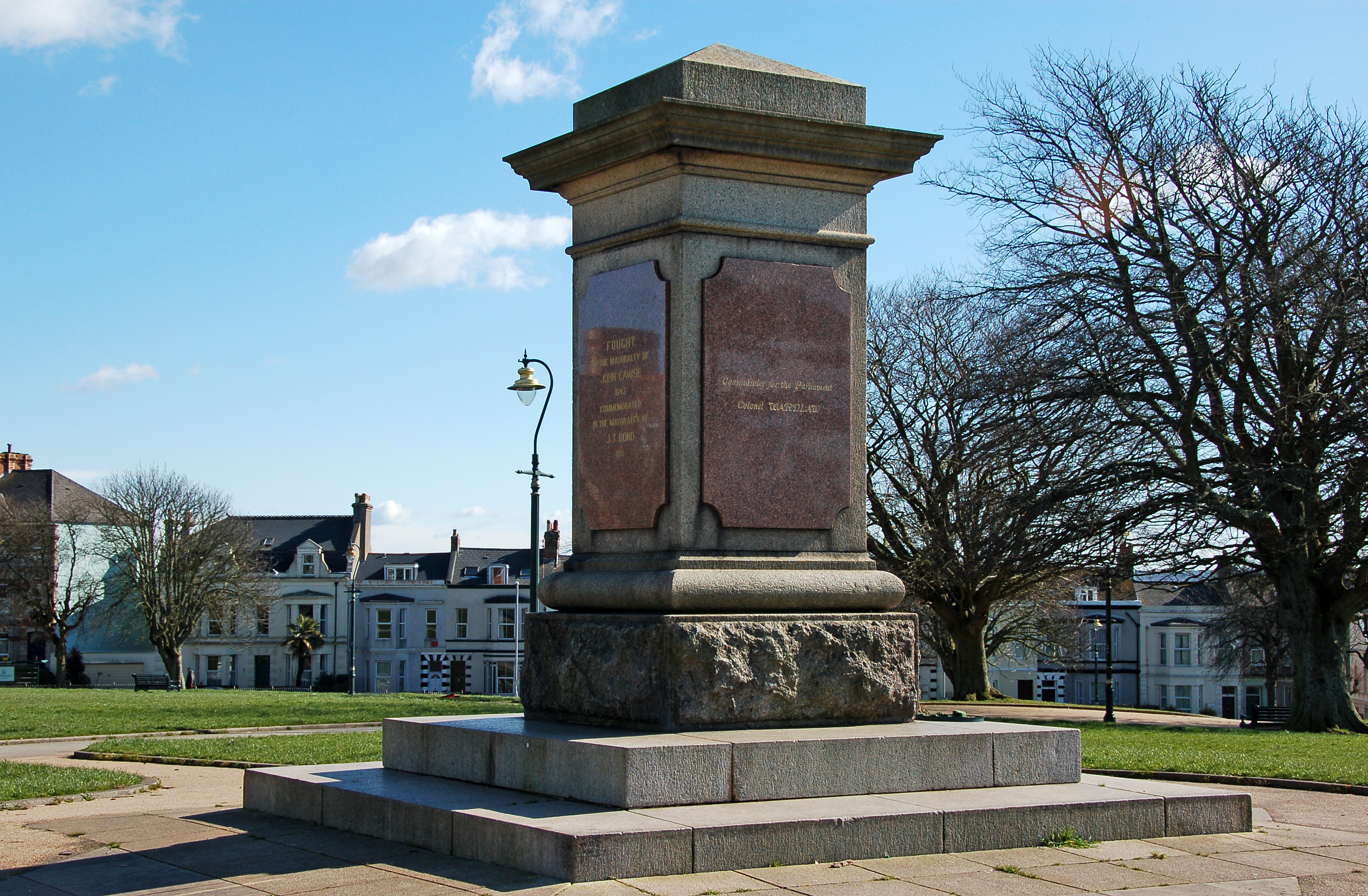
Freedom Fields monument

On 21 October, the Royalists began preparing an attack on Fort Stamford, an isolated position constructed on a peninsula, which they thought commanded Plymouth Sound. Despite a series of delaying actions by the Parliamentary garrison, the fort was captured on 5 November, but the Royalists gained little from their victory. Cannon placed in Mount Stamford could not stop ships entering Plymouth Sound, and resupplying the town, while abandoning these fortifications reduced the strain on the garrison.

Further attacks were easily repulsed, the most serious being on 3 December, when the Royalists took advantage of low tide to capture an outpost at Laira Point. A Parliamentarian attempt to retake it was forced to retreat to what is now 'Freedom Fields Park', where they held their ground for several hours. This allowed additional Parliamentarian troops to be assembled, and the outnumbered Royalists withdrew, although much of their rearguard was cut off by the incoming tide. The siege was lifted on 25 December, although the Royalists retained Fort Stamford, and continued the blockade.

== Post 1643 ==
In January 1644, Wardlaw was replaced as commander by Colonel Gould, and the blockade was lifted for a short period in July, when the Earl of Essex brought his army into the South West. When Gould died in July, he was replaced by a Colonel Martin, who instituted a policy of constantly attacking Royalist outposts.

After defeating Essex at Lostwithiel in September 1644, the main Royalist army from Oxford under Charles I arrived outside Plymouth, and demanded its surrender. Parliament could still send in supplies and reinforcements by sea, including a regiment led by the experienced and aggressive Colonel John Birch. This allowed the garrison to fight on, and with the Royalist army urgently needed elsewhere, Charles left only a minor force under Sir Richard Grenville to continue the blockade.

Grenville launched a major attack in January 1645 which captured some of the outlying defensive forts but was beaten off, and in February the garrison retook Mount Batten, which signalled the end of serious efforts to capture the town. The blockade finally ended in December 1645, when the New Model Army arrived in the West.

== Sources ==
- Barratt, John (2005). The Civil War in the South-West England 1642-1646 (Battlefield Britain). Pen & Sword Military. ISBN 978-1783460410.
- Britton, John; Brayley, Edward (1803). Beauties of England and Wales, Volume 4. Thomas Maiden. pp. 150–161.
- "Freedom Fields Park". Devon Gardens.
- "Plymouth Sound Defences". CastlesFortsBattles.co.uk.
- Day, Jon (2007). Gloucester & Newbury 1643: The Turning Point of the Civil War. Pen & Sword. ISBN 978-1-84415-591-0.
- Hopper, Andrew (2012). Turncoats and Renegadoes: Changing Sides During the English Civil Wars. OUP. ISBN 978-0-19-957585-5.
- Royle, Trevor (2004). Civil War: The Wars of the Three Kingdoms 1638–1660 (2006 ed.). Abacus. ISBN 978-0-349-11564-1.
- Stoyle, Mark (2020). "Wounded att Stampford Worke': Two Devon 'Tinners' Recall their Wartime Service". Civil War Petitions.
- Wanklyn, Malcolm; Jones, Frank (2005). The Military History Of The English Civil War, 1642-1646: Strategy And Tactics. Pearson Longman. ISBN 978-0582772816.
- Wedgwood, CV (1958). The King's War, 1641-1647 (2001 ed.). Penguin Classics. ISBN 978-0141390727.
- Worth, Richard Nicholls (1890). History of Plymouth: From the Earliest Period to the Present Time. W Brenden.
