= John St Aubyn =

John St Aubyn may refer to:

- John St Aubyn (sheriff), Sheriff of Cornwall, 1568
- John St Aubyn (Member of the Addled Parliament) (c. 1577–1639), MP for Cornwall, 1614; MP for Mitchell, 1621
- John St Aubyn (Parliamentarian) (1613–1684) of Clowance, MP for Tregony, 1640; Cornwall, 1656; St Ives, 1659,1660
- Sir John St Aubyn, 1st Baronet (1645–1687), MP for Mitchell (UK Parliament constituency)
- Sir John St Aubyn, 2nd Baronet (1670–1714), MP for Helston (UK Parliament constituency)
- Sir John St Aubyn, 3rd Baronet (1696–1744)
- Sir John St Aubyn, 4th Baronet (1726–1772), MP for Grampound (UK Parliament constituency)
- Sir John St Aubyn, 5th Baronet (1758–1839)
- John St Aubyn, 1st Baron St Levan (1829–1908)
- John St Aubyn, 4th Baron St Levan (1919–2013)

== See also ==
- John Aubyn (disambiguation)
- St Aubyn baronets
