= St Aubyn =

St Aubyn may refer to

== Places ==
- St Aubyn, Queensland, Australia

== Organisations ==
- St Aubyn Centre, a mental health facility in Essex, England
- St Aubyns School, a boys' preparatory school in Rottingdean, England
- St Aubyn's School, a co-educational preparatory school, in London, England

== People ==
- St Aubyn baronets of Cornwall, England
- Alan St. Aubyn, pen name of British author Frances L. Marshall (1839–1920)
- Amarah-Jae St. Aubyn (born 1994), British actor
- Catherine St Aubyn (1760–1836), English amateur artist
- Edward St Aubyn, English author and journalist
- James Piers St Aubyn (1815–1895), English architect, largely of churches
- John St Aubyn (disambiguation), several people
- Nick St Aubyn (born 1955), British Conservative politician, MP for Guildford
- Thomas St Aubyn (c. 1578 – 1637), English MP for St Ives and then Grampound
- William St. Aubyn (by 1526 – 1558/1571), English MP for Helston, West Looe and Camelford
- St. Aubyn Hines (born 1972), Jamaican Olympic boxer
