= Carew baronets of Antony (1641) =

Escutcheon of the Carew baronets of Antony

The Carew baronetcy, of Antony in Cornwall, was created on 9 August 1641 for Richard Carew, Member of Parliament for Cornwall and St Michael's.

His son the 2nd Baronet was executed for treason in December 1643, and was succeeded by his son the 3rd Baronet, Member of Parliament for Cornwall, Bodmin, Lostwithiel and Saltash.

The title became extinct in 1748. It was, however, used twice more as an assumed title.

== Carew baronets, of Antony (1641) ==
- Sir Richard Carew, 1st Baronet (c. 1580–1643)
- Sir Alexander Carew, 2nd Baronet (1609–1644)
- Sir John Carew, 3rd Baronet (1635–1692)
- Sir Richard Carew, 4th Baronet (1683–1703)
- Sir William Carew, 5th Baronet (1690–1744)
- Sir Coventry Carew, 6th Baronet (c.1716–1748)
- John Carew, assumed title 7th Baronet (1708–1762)
- Alexander Carew, assumed title 8th Baronet (1715–1799)
