= Humphry Morice (MP for Launceston) =

Whig politician (c.1723–1785)

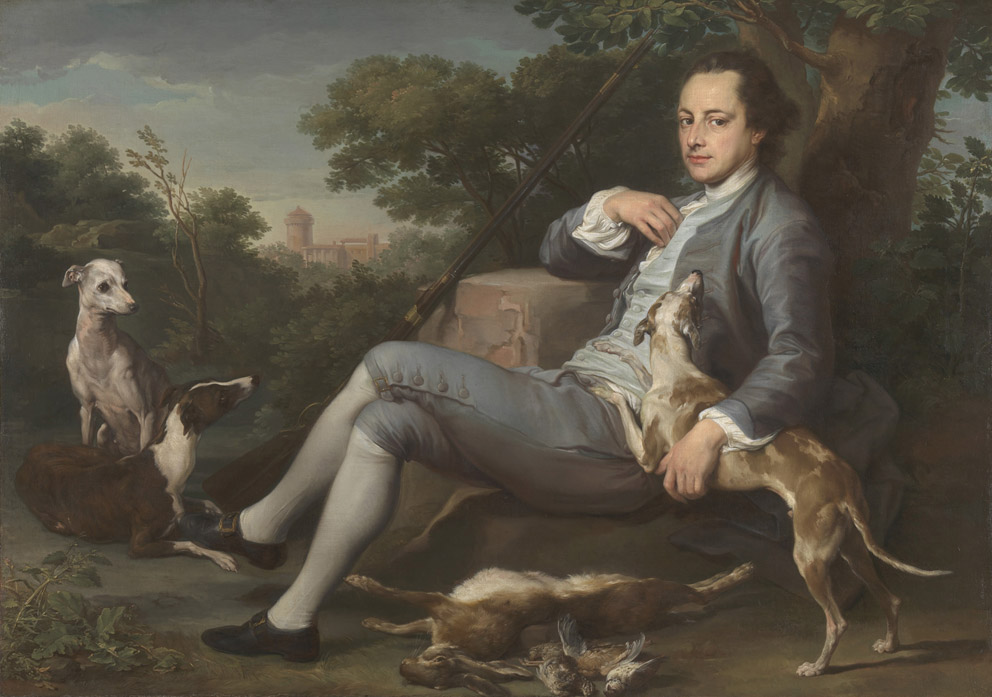
Portrait of Humphry Morice by Pompeo Batoni

Humphry Morice (1723 – 18 October 1785) was a Whig Member of Parliament for the Cornish parliamentary borough of Launceston from 2 February 1750 until 1780.

He was the son of Humphry Morice, MP, who embezzled large sums of money from the Bank of England and his daughter's trust fund and was widely believed to have poisoned himself to forestall exposure.

The death of his second cousin in 1750 brought Morice great wealth and the electoral control of two Cornish boroughs, but his poor health and perhaps his personality prevented him from achieving high office. After 1760, he was frequently abroad in Italy, where he was a patron of the painter Pompeo Batoni.

He briefly achieved ministerial office in 1762 as Comptroller of the Household, possibly by accident; however, he was removed from that office in 1763, and although he was appointed Lord Warden of the Stannaries and was sworn of the Privy Council, he was not a significant political figure thereafter. Declining health and great expense made him sell out his electoral interests to the Duke of Northumberland in 1775. After 1782, he lived entirely abroad, dying in Naples in 1785. His love of animals was reflected in his will, wherein he left a substantial legacy to care for his horses and hounds.

== Early life ==
He was the firstborn son of Humphry Morice, Governor of the Bank of England, by Morice's second wife Catherine. He succeeded his father in 1731, but did not inherit any great estate from him, as his father was discovered to have been embezzling on a large scale for years. In 1750, however, the younger Humphry inherited considerable wealth and the estate of Werrington, Cornwall (then in Devon) upon the death of his second cousin, Sir William Morice, 3rd Baronet. The estate brought with it electoral patronage which allowed Morice to select the members of parliament for the Cornish boroughs of Newport and Launceston; Morice had himself returned for the latter to replace his cousin after inheriting the estate.

== Political biography ==
Sir William Morice, a Tory, became involved in a sharp quarrel with the Duke of Bedford in 1748, in the course of which Bedford bought an estate at Newport and attempted to make an electoral interest there. He intended to support George Brydges Rodney as a candidate at Launceston, but found that the corporation there entirely supported Humphry Morice and did not contest the latter's return in place of Sir William. After Bedford fell out with the Whigs Pelham and Newcastle, the Duke offered Morice complete freedom to choose candidates for the two boroughs if he would go into opposition against the ministry. Morice refused, and reported to Pelham that he would only nominate supporters of the ministry, and intended to turn out the sitting members (Tories chosen by Sir William) at the next election. This promise he fulfilled in the 1754 election, nominating Government candidates for Newport and one seat at Launceston (his half-brother-in-law, Sir George Lee was the candidate at Launceston, and Lee's brother John one of the two at Newport) and reserving the last seat for himself. Bedford, who had taken a personal resentment to Morice's refusal, put up his man of business in the Commons, Richard Rigby, and Jeffrey French for the seat to vex Morice, albeit with little prospect of winning. The "vianders", the returning officers of Newport, were appointed by Morice as lord of the manor of Werrington, and Rigby reported to Bedford that they had been blatantly partisan in their disqualification of votes. Rigby and French were outpolled, even so, and Bedford did not think an election petition worthwhile. "Little Morice...peevishly well bred," as an irritated Rigby described him, would not be challenged again by Bedford. Morice expected to be rewarded by Government office, and asked in June 1755 for a seat on the Board of Green Cloth. For the time being, however, he received only an assurance from Newcastle that he would receive a suitable office when one became available.

Morice again appealed to Newcastle in 1757, when the latter was forming his third ministry. Newcastle ultimately recommended to the King that Morice be appointed second Clerk Comptroller of the Green Cloth; Morice noted in a letter to Newcastle that he had waited to kiss hands until the inquiry on the loss of Menorca, which seriously threatened Newcastle, had concluded. The appointment officially dated from 6 May 1757 and paid a salary of £938 per year; he was returned without opposition at Launceston at the ensuing ministerial by-election.

In October 1758, Earl Tylney, while visiting Werrington, expressed an interest in entering Parliament. Tylney had the ear of Bedford, and Morice saw an opportunity to compose his quarrel at Newport. He offered the seat to Tylney on condition that Bedford desist from interfering with Morice's interests in the two boroughs, but was forced to withdraw the offer upon discovering that the electorate would not accept any candidate associated with Bedford. When a vacancy did occur at Launceston upon the death of Sir George Lee, Newcastle proposed to replace him with Edward Simpson, Lee's successor as Dean of Arches. Morice thought success doubtful, and Newcastle did not want to subject Simpson to the expense of a hotly contested election. Morice instead chose Peter Burrell, who had previously sought a borough seat from Newcastle but could not be provided with one. The by-election was indeed contested: Sir John St Aubyn, a Tory and nephew of Sir William Morice, had held a seat at Launceston until Humphry turned him out in 1754, and now returned to try conclusions again. He was victorious over Burrell by 15 votes to 14, but the result was reversed on petition on 21 February 1759, and Burrell was seated instead.

With two Parliamentary boroughs at his command, Morice aspired to higher political office, largely without success. A number of circumstances impeded his rise. When Newcastle was whipping MPs in October 1755 to ensure their support of the Ministry's military actions in North America, his election manager, Viscount Dupplin, warned him that he must write directly to Morice, who was apt to be "high and a little touchy". In 1759, a group of men attempted to extort money from him by accusing him of sodomy, then a capital crime. Morice prosecuted them for extortion, and two were sentenced to prison and the pillory, but the strain badly affected his health, and he went to Italy in 1760 to recover. The trip also allowed him to gratify his sense of aesthetics. A friend of the architect John Chute, he took with him a letter of introduction from Horace Walpole to Sir Horace Mann in Florence, through which he passed on the way to Naples. His stay there was prolonged; in the spring of 1761, he visited Rome, where he had his portrait painted by Pompeo Batoni and became one of Batoni's most important English clients, purchasing the artist's Diana and Cupid. An avid collector of paintings, particularly landscapes, Morice built up a notable collection at his house, "The Grove", in Chiswick, which Walpole would admire in later years. Morice was also an avid sportsman and foxhunter, and particularly tender to animals; in Batoni's portrait, he is depicted after a day's hunting outside Rome, with three of his hounds about him.

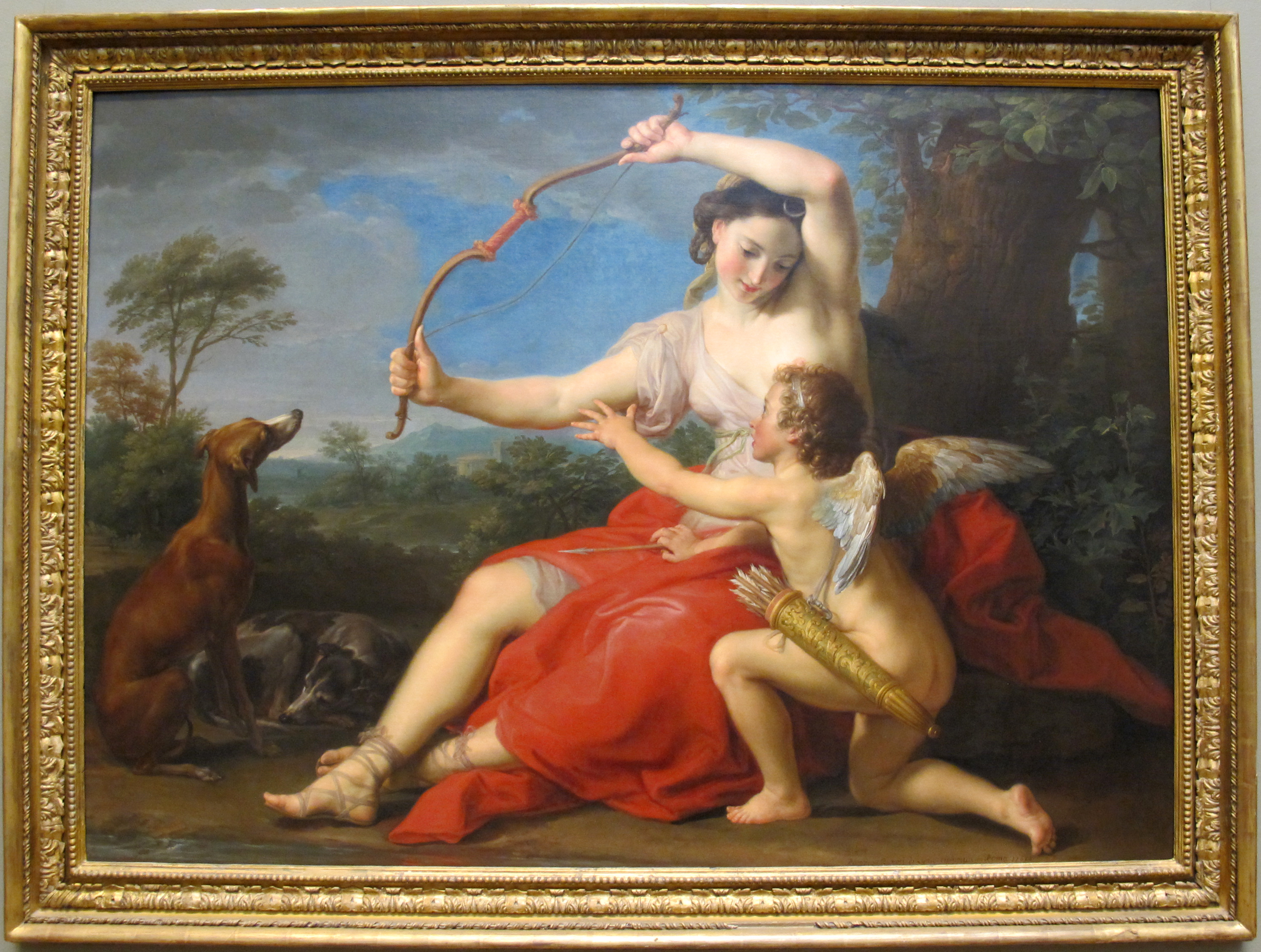
Batoni's Diana and Cupid, purchased by Morice.

As a result of his travels, he was absent from England upon the death of George II. Peter Burrell wrote to Newcastle to ask that Morice's interests not be forgotten, but he was turned out of the Board of Green Cloth in the new administration. His resentment of what he considered an injustice on Newcastle's part was evidently communicated to his friends; Richard Bull, Morice's member for Newport since 1756, declined a secret service pension, explaining that he could not accept rewards from Newcastle while Morice was out of favour. When John Lee was dying in the autumn of 1761, Morice wrote to Newcastle from Naples, declaring that he would accept only the King's candidate for the anticipated vacancy at Newport, not Newcastle's, owing to the slight given him. He had returned to England for the autumn session of Parliament by the time of Lee's death in November, and arranged for the return of William de Grey, recently appointed solicitor general to Queen Charlotte, at the by-election.

Morice now became an adherent of the rising Lord Bute in his quest for office under the new king. He was, apparently accidentally, offered the post of Comptroller of the Household under the new ministry at the end of 1762. Henry Fox wrote to Bute to disapprove: "I can with difficulty digest the giving the comptroller’s staff to Mr. Morice. His character has a ridicule, to say nothing more, belonging to it; it will certainly lower the dignity of the place..." Fox suggested that Morice might be reappointed to a lesser office on the Board of Green Cloth again. Realizing the error, Bute sent his brother, James Stuart-Mackenzie, who had met Morice in Italy, to try to persuade him to change offices with Lord Charles Spencer, who was to be Surveyor of Gardens and Waters and Out-Ranger of Windsor Forest; persuasion was vain, however, and Morice was appointed to the comptrollership on 21 December 1762. Sworn of the Privy Council in January 1763, he lost the comptrollership in April when the Bute Ministry fell. The Grenville Ministry compensated him in June by appointing him Lord Warden of the Stannaries. He raised the question as to whether the wardenship and its concomitant offices (High Steward of Cornwall and Rider and Master Forester of Dartmoor) would vacate his seat and necessitate a by-election, but the House of Commons agreed this was not the case.

While Morice continued to support successive administrations, he made no reported speeches in Parliament, and seems to have attended sporadically. In the autumn of 1767, he wrote to the Earl of Shelburne, then the Southern Secretary, asking him to intercede on behalf of William Pearce and Richard Williams. The two had been condemned to death at the summer assizes at Bodmin for wrecking, and opinion in Morice's boroughs running much in their favour, he felt obliged to act on their behalf. In the event, Williams was reprieved by his judge and sentenced to transportation, while Pearce was hanged. Morice again put forth his candidates unchallenged at the 1768 election, and was chosen recorder of Launceston in 1771. But his influence was fading, and in the 1774 election, he anticipated a serious contest there, nominating himself and Richard Bull in both of his boroughs. While Morice finished at the head of the poll for Launceston, Bull was defeated by the challenger, John Buller. Morice chose to sit for Launceston, and put in John Frederick at Newport, but the event seems to have crystallised his resolution to leave politics. In early 1775, he sold Werrington to the Duke of Northumberland for a sum reputed to be nearly £100,000. Morice informed Lord North of his decision in a written memorial, explaining that the expense of electioneering (£3,000 per year above and beyond the £1,200 revenues of Werrington), the effects of his gout, the prodigality of his steward in maintaining his interest, and his check in the 1774 elections had all convinced him to give up control of the boroughs.

== Illness and legacies ==
His health was indeed declining: Horace Walpole thought he looked "dreadfully ill" at a dinner party at Princess Amelia's in 1779, and the following year, reported him "confined in Paris by the gout". He did not attend Parliament during the turbulent early months of 1780, and stood down from Parliament at that year's general election. His travels abroad did his health little good, as he was confined with gout at Chiswick within a week of his return that autumn. By the summer of 1781, he had recovered, but was attacked again that autumn. His condition declined, and he went to Bath in hopes of a cure. While there, he received the news that Margaret, the widow of Sir Robert Brown, had died and left him a life interest in an estate worth £1,500 per year.

Morice drew up his will in July 1782 at The Grove, just before leaving England for what proved to be the last time. He also resigned his office as recorder of Launceston. With the sale of his properties in Cornwall to the Duke of Northumberland, his retention as Lord Warden of the Stannaries was an anomaly; the Second Rockingham Ministry considered removing him, but it was the Fox-North Coalition that did so in August 1783, shortly after a rumour of his death had reached England and been subsequently contradicted. (He was, in fact, in Lausanne, and planned to winter in Naples.) Sir Francis Basset, a distant relative, (Note: Basset was the grand-nephew of Humphry's second cousin, Sir William, and the nephew of Sir John St Aubyn, whom Humphry turned out of Parliament on the death of Sir William.) threatened to withdraw his support from the Coalition, but did not carry out his threat. Morice's illness did not blunt his good humor: at the end of 1784, Walpole spoke of him as having been in Ischia, in better health, and "as he always is, whether better or worse, in good spirits."

Notwithstanding the effects of the Italian climate, Morice succumbed to illness on 18 October 1785. Two codicils to his will, written while abroad, throw an interesting light on his character. He asked Earl Tylney's surgeon to remove his heart after death to prevent his being buried alive, and instructed that his two servants, executors as regards his effects in Naples, were to continued dwelling in his house there for a suitable time so that they did not have to return to England in the height of summer or winter. An earlier codicil, written to his trustees, directed that an annuity of £600, drawing on his remaining estates in Devon and Cornwall, was to be used to pay for the upkeep of his horses and dogs, the surplus to go to his legatee, Mrs. Levina Luther. Mrs. Luther was the wife of John Luther and stepdaughter of Richard Bull; Morice left his estate to her for life, and to her half-sisters Elizabeth and Catherine Bull after her death, but the three agreed to divide the estate equally. His collection of art was sold to the Earl of Ashburnham.

== Notes ==
Parliament of Great Britain
Preceded by Sir John St Aubyn; Sir William Morice	Member of Parliament for Launceston; 1750–1780; With: Sir John St Aubyn 1750–1754, 1758–1759; Sir George Lee 1754–1758; Peter Burrell 1759–1768; William Amherst 1768–1774; John Buller 1774–1780	Succeeded by Viscount Cranborne; Thomas Bowlby
Preceded by Richard Bull; Richard Henry Alexander Bennet	Member of Parliament for Newport; 1774; With: Richard Bull	Succeeded by Richard Bull; John Frederick
Political offices
Preceded by Lord George Cavendish	Comptroller of the Household; 1762–1763	Succeeded by Lord Charles Spencer
Honorary titles
Preceded by The Earl Waldegrave	Lord Warden of the Stannaries; 1763–1783	Succeeded by Viscount Lewisham
