= Sir John Molesworth, 4th Baronet =

British landowner and Tory politician

Sir John Molesworth, 4th Baronet (1705–1766) of Pencarrow, Cornwall, was a British landowner and Tory politician who sat in the House of Commons between 1734 and 1761.

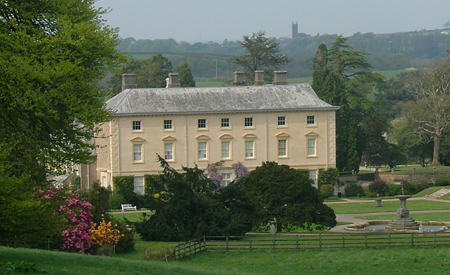
Pencarrow

Molesworth was baptized on 28 February 1705, the eldest of Sir John Molesworth, 3rd Baronet, and his wife Jane Arscott daughter of John Arscott of Tetcott, Devon. In June 1723, he succeeded to the baronetcy and Pencarrow, on the death of his father. He married Barbara Morice, daughter of Sir Nicholas Morice, 2nd Baronet in 1728.

At the 1734 British general election Molesworth was returned unopposed as a Tory Member of Parliament for Newport on the interest of his brother-in-law, Sir William Morice. He did not stand at the 1741 British general election but was returned as MP for Cornwall at a by-election on 12 December 1744 in succession to his wife's brother-in-law, Sir John St Aubyn, 3rd Baronet. He was returned unopposed again at the 1747 British general election. He voted consistently against the Governments of Walpole and Pelham.

Molesworth was alarmed at the threat of a contest at the 1754 British general election but it did not materialize and he was returned unopposed. However he declined the prospect of a contest at the 1761 British general election.

Molesworth started the construction of Pencarrow in the 1760s, extending a large older house on the site. He died on 4 April 1766, leaving two sons and a daughter. He was succeeded in the baronetcy by his son John who completed the house at Pencarrow.

Parliament of Great Britain
Preceded by Thomas Herbert; Sir William Morice	Member of Parliament for Newport; 1734–1741; With: Thomas Herbert 1734–1739; Nicholas Herbert 1740–1741	Succeeded by Nicholas Herbert; Thomas Bury
Preceded by Sir Coventry Carew, Bt; Sir John St Aubyn, Bt	Member of Parliament for Cornwall; 1744–1761; With: Sir Coventry Carew, Bt 1744–1748; James Buller 1748–1761	Succeeded by James Buller; Sir John St Aubyn, Bt
Baronetage of England
Preceded by John Molesworth	Baronet (of Pencarrow); 1723–1766	Succeeded by John Molesworth
