= James Buller (1717–1765) =

British politician (1717–1765)

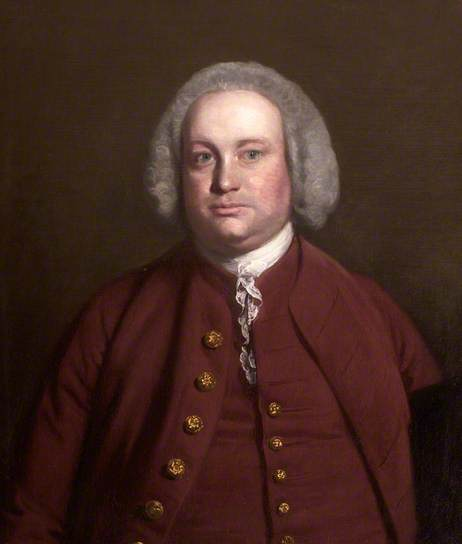
James Buller (1717-1765), portrait by Sir Joshua Reynolds (1723-1792), collection of trustees of Antony House, Cornwall

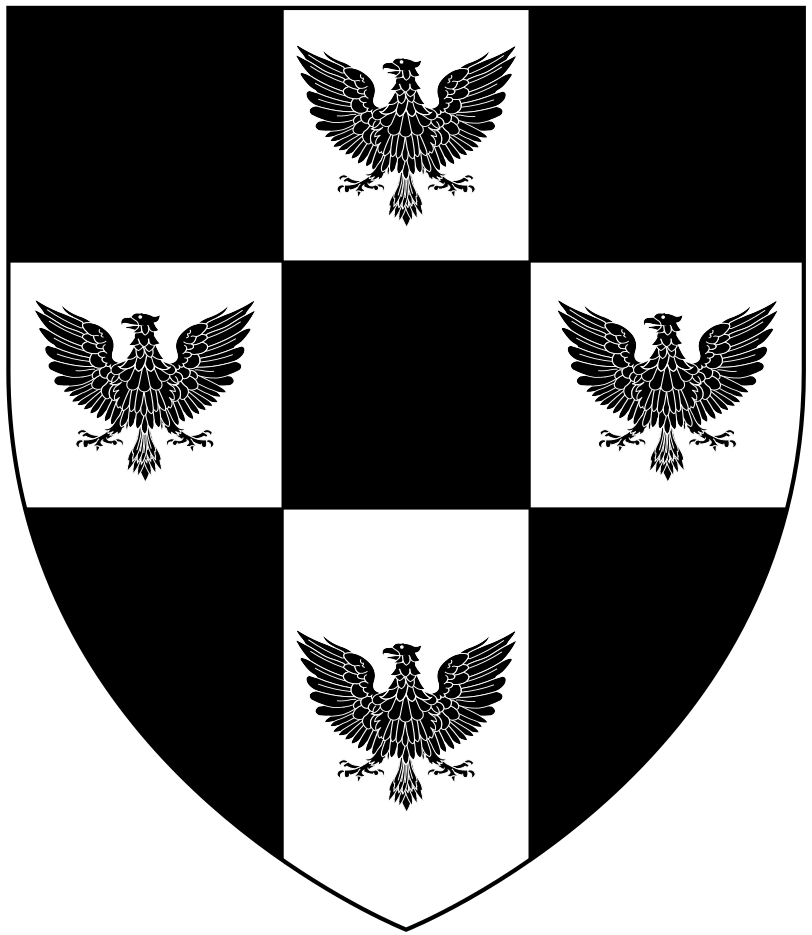
Arms of Buller: Sable, on a cross argent quarter pierced of the field four eagles displayed of the first

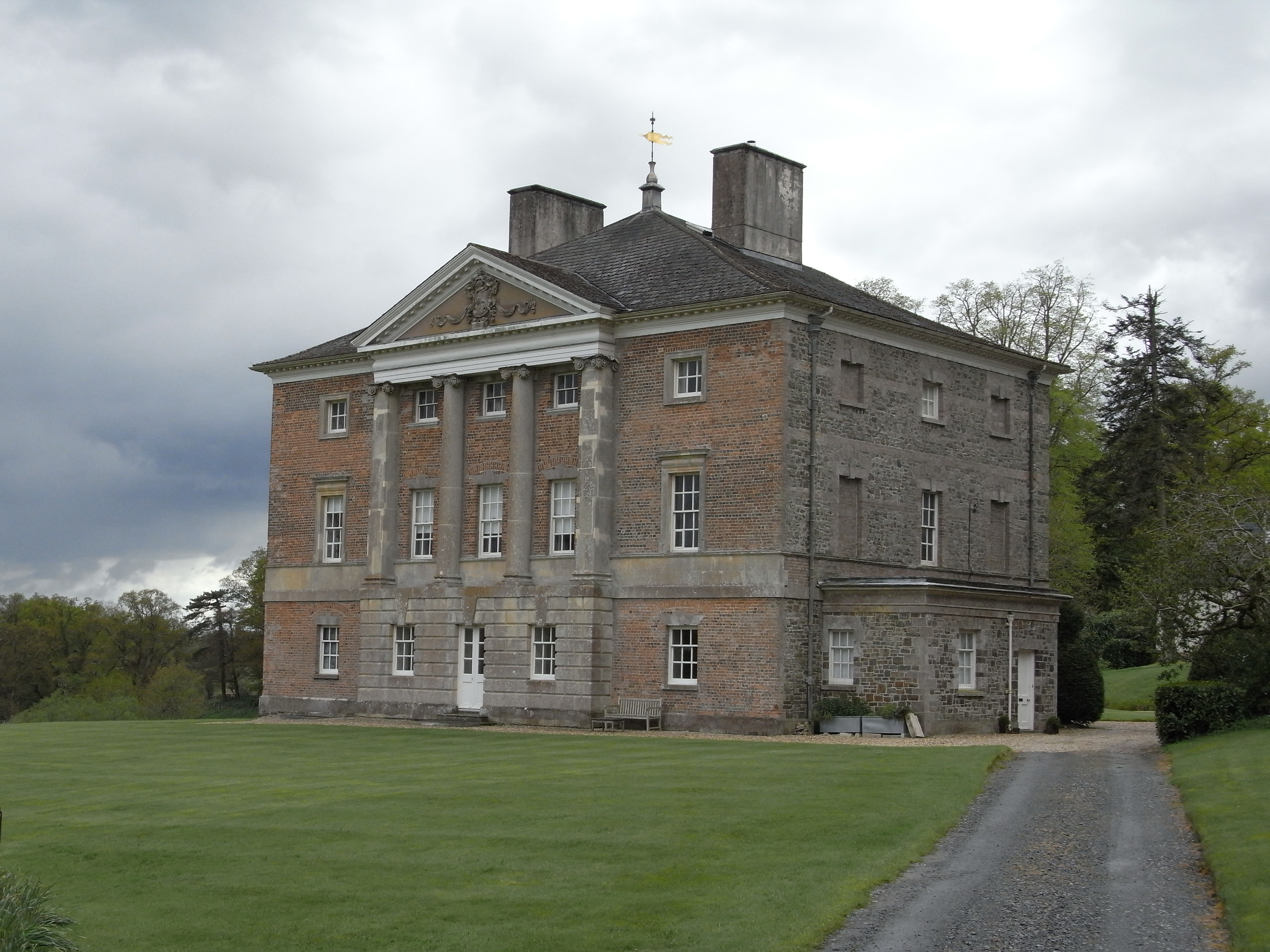
Kings Nympton Park, built as "New Place" by James Buller (1717-1765) between 1746–49 to the design of Francis Cartwright of Blandford in Dorset, based on Marble Hill House in Twickenham, one of the earliest Palladian houses in England built between 1724–29

James Buller (17 June 1717 – 30 April 1765) of Morval in Cornwall and of Downes and King's Nympton in Devon, was a Member of Parliament for East Looe in Cornwall (1741–47) and for the County of Cornwall (1748-1765). He was ancestor of the Viscounts Dilhorne and the Barons Churston and built the Palladian mansion Kings Nympton Park in Devon.

== Origins ==
He was the eldest son of John Francis Buller (1695-1751), MP for Saltash 1718-1722, of Morval, Cornwall by his wife Rebecca Trelawney (d.1743), daughter and co-heiress of Sir Jonathan Trelawny, 3rd Baronet, Bishop of Winchester. His younger brothers were the politicians John Buller (1721–1786), MP and Lord of the Admiralty, Francis Buller (1723-1764), MP, and William Buller (1735-1796), Bishop of Exeter.

== Education ==
He was educated at Balliol College, Oxford.

== Career ==
Buller was elected MP for East Looe in Cornwall in 1741 and represented that constituency until 1747 In 1748 he was elected MP for Cornwall, sitting until his death in 1765.

== Marriages and children ==
Buller married twice:

- Firstly on 19 November 1739, to Elizabeth Gould (d.1742), daughter and co-heir of William Gould of Downes near Crediton, Devon, (which thenceforth became the principal Buller seat) and had by her a son:
  - James Buller (1740-1772), the father of James Buller (1766–1827), MP.
- Secondly in 1744 to Lady Jane Bathurst (d.1794), second (or third) daughter of Allen Bathurst, 1st Earl Bathurst. Between 1746–9 he built for her Kings Nympton Park in Devon. By his second wife, he had three sons and three daughters including:
  - John Buller (1745-1793) (eldest son), of Morval, MP for Exeter 1768-74, Launceston 1774-80, West Looe 1780-2, a Lord of the Treasury. He inherited the estate of Morval from his father. John married Anne, the sister of Sir William Lemon in 1770 at Mylor, Cornwall. He was appointed Commissioner of Excise for Great Britain in 1790.
  - Sir Francis Buller, 1st Baronet (3rd son) was a judge and was created a baronet in 1790 and was the ancestor of Baron Churston.
  - Mary Buller, 3rd daughter, wife of James II Templer (1748-1813) of Stover House, Teigngrace, Devon.

== Death ==
Buller died in 1765.

== Sources ==
- Burke's Landed Gentry, 1937, pp. 277–279, Buller of Downes.
- History of Parliament biography

Parliament of Great Britain
Preceded by Charles Longueville; Henry Bilson Legge	Member of Parliament for East Looe; 1741 – 1747; With: Francis Gashry	Succeeded by Francis Gashry; John Buller
Preceded by Sir Coventry Carew; Sir John Molesworth	Member of Parliament for Cornwall; 1748–1765; With: Sir John Molesworth 1748–1761; Sir John St Aubyn 1761–1765	Succeeded by Sir John St Aubyn; Sir John Molesworth
