= John Aubyn =

John Aubyn may refer to:

- John Aubyn, senior, MP for Reigate in January 1377, 1378 and October 1382
- John Aubyn, junior, MP for Reigate in April 1384, 1385, 1386, September 1388, January 1390 and 1393

== See also ==
- John St Aubyn (disambiguation)
