= Frances Basset, 2nd Baroness Basset =

Frances Basset, 2nd Baroness Basset (30 April 1781 – 22 January 1855) was a British peeress.

Baptised in St Marylebone Church in London on 23 May 1781, she was the only child of Francis Basset, 1st Baron de Dunstanville and Basset and his first wife Frances Susanna, daughter of John Hippesley Coxe. On her father's death in 1835, she succeeded per a special remainder to the barony of Basset. She died aged 74, unmarried and childless at her seat Tehidy Park. She funded the construction of All Saints' Church, Tuckingmill which was built between 1843 and 1845.

She was buried in Illogan in Cornwall, and with her death the barony became extinct. Her estates passed to the eldest son of a cousin.

== Arms ==
Coat of arms of Frances Basset, 2nd Baroness Basset
| Escutcheon Or three bars wavy Gules. Supporters Two unicorns Argent armed maned tufted and crined Or gorged with a plain collar Gules pendent therefrom a shield Or charged with three bars wavy Gules. |

== See also ==
- Tehidy Country Park
- Great Cornish Families

Peerage of Great Britain
| Preceded by Francis Basset | Baroness Basset; 1835–1855 | Extinct |
