= Sir John Carew, 3rd Baronet =

English politician (1635-1692)

Member of Parliament for Saltash
- In office 1690-1692

Member of Parliament for Cornwall
- In office 1660; 1689-1690

Member of Parliament for Lostwithiel
- In office 1679-1685

Member of Parliament for Bodmin
- In office 1661-1679

Personal details
- Born: 6 November 1635
- Died: 1 August 1692 (aged 56)
- Spouse(s): Sarah Hungerford (d. 1671); Elizabeth Norton (d. 1679); Mary Morice
- Children: John Carew; Alexander Carew; Jane Carew; Rachel Carew; Sir Richard Carew, 4th Baronet; Sir William Carew, 5th Baronet; Gertrude Carew; Mary Carew
- Parent: Andrew Carew (father)
- Relatives: Sir Richard Carew, 1st Baronet (grandfather); Sir Coventry Carew, 6th Baronet (grandson)

Arms of Carew: Or, 3 lions passant in pale sable These were the arms shown on the seal of "Nicholas de Carreu" (c.1255–1311), appended to the Barons' Letter, 1301, which he joined as "Lord of Mulesford" and which were blazoned for the same bearer in the Caerlaverock Poem or Roll of Arms of 1300, when he was present at the Siege of Caerlaverock Castle. From him are descended the Carew baronets of Antony and of Haccombe

Sir John Carew, 3rd Baronet (6 November 1635 – 1 August 1692) of Antony, Cornwall, was an English politician who sat in the House of Commons variously between 1660 and 1692.

== Origins ==
Carew was the third but eldest surviving son of Sir Alexander Carew, 2nd Baronet (1608–1644) by his wife Jane Rolle (1606-1679), daughter of Robert Rolle (d. 1633) of Heanton Satchville, Petrockstowe, Devon. His father was beheaded on Tower Hill on 23 December 1644 for attempting to betray the Parliamentary cause during the English Civil War.

== Career ==
Carew succeeded to the baronetcy in 1644 and although the estates were initially sequestered they were later released and he was allowed to inherit in November 1645. In 1660, Carew was elected Member of Parliament for Cornwall in the Convention Parliament. In 1661 he was elected MP for Bodmin for the Cavalier Parliament and sat until 1679. He was then elected MP for Lostwithiel until 1685. In 1689 he was re-elected MP for Cornwall until 1690 when he was elected MP for Saltash. He sat until his death at the age of 56 in 1692.

== Marriages and children ==
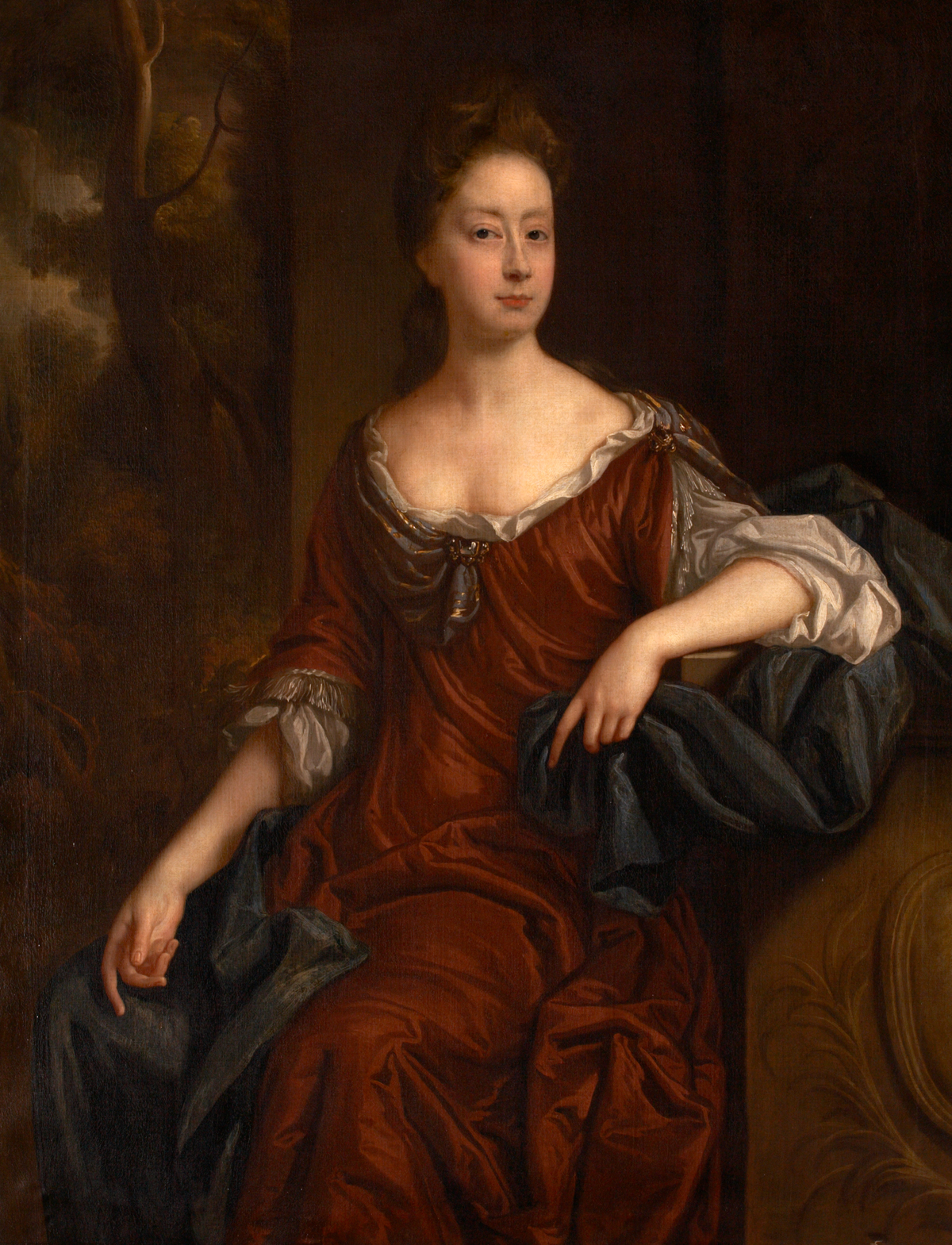
Mary Morice (d.1698), daughter of Sir William Morice, 1st Baronet (c.1628–1690) of Werrington, Devon, and 3rd wife of Sir John Carew, 3rd Baronet (1635–1692) of Antony. Painted by John Riley, c.1682, Collection of Antony House, National Trust

Carew married three times:

- Firstly to Sarah Hungerford (d.1671), daughter of Antony Hungerford of Farleigh Hungerford Castle, by whom he had the following children:
  - John Carew (1670–1672), died young
  - Alexander Carew (1667–1669), died young
  - Jane Carew (1662–1700), second wife of Jonathan Rashleigh II (1642–1702), of Menabilly, Cornwall, MP for Fowey and Sheriff of Cornwall in 1687. From this marriage were descended the Pole-Carew family which in the person of her great-grandson Reginald Pole-Carew (1753–1835) inherited Antony in 1748 on the death of Sir Coventry Carew, 6th Baronet (c. 1716–1748), and in compliance with the terms of the bequest adopted the name Carew in addition to his paternal surname of Pole.
  - Rachel Carew (1664–?), wife of Ambrose Manaton of Devon.
- Secondly he married Elizabeth Norton (d.1679), daughter of Richard Norton of Southwick, Hampshire; without children.
- Thirdly he married Mary Morice (d.1698), daughter of Sir William Morice, 1st Baronet (c.1628–1690) of Werrington, Devon, by whom he had the following children:
  - Sir Richard Carew, 4th Baronet (1683–1703)
  - Sir William Carew, 5th Baronet (1690–1744)
  - Gertrude Carew (born 1682 – 14 April 1736), she married firstly to Sir Godfrey Copley, 2 Baronet, (c. 1653 – 9 April 1709), she married as her 2nd husband Sir Coplestone Warwick Bampfylde, 3rd Baronet (c. 1689–1727), of Poltimore and North Molton, Devon
  - Mary Carew (born 1689)

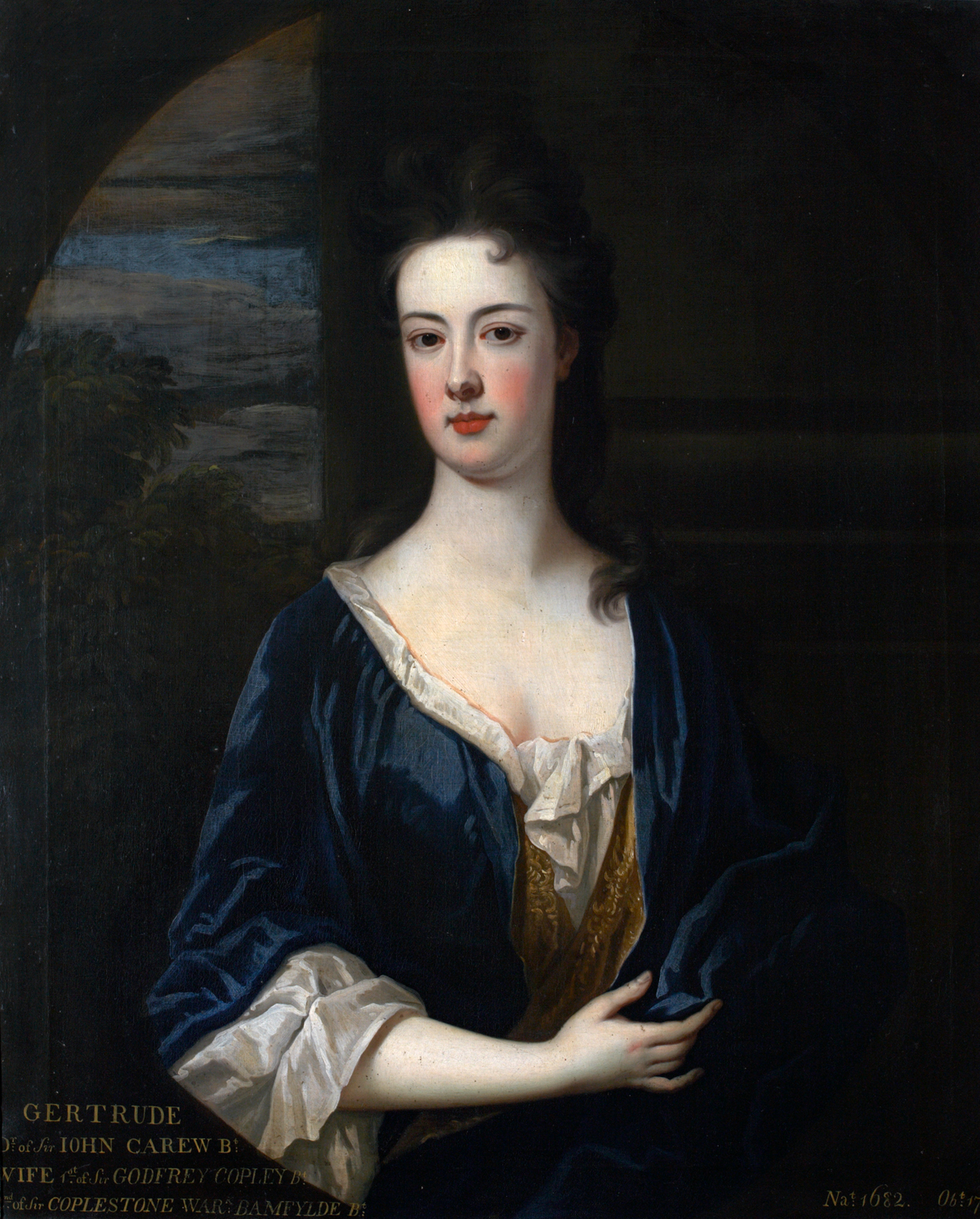
Gertrude Carew (1682–1736), a daughter of Sir John Carew, 3rd Baronet (1635–1692) of Antony, Portrait by Charles d' Agar, National Trust, collection of Antony House

== Sources ==
- Vivian, Lt.Col. J.L., (Ed.) The Visitations of the County of Devon: Comprising the Heralds' Visitations of 1531, 1564 & 1620, Exeter, 1895, pp. 133–145, pedigree of Carew

Baronetage of England
Preceded by Alexander Carew	Baronet (of Antony); 1644–1692	Succeeded by Richard Carew
