= Sir William Carew, 5th Baronet =

British politician

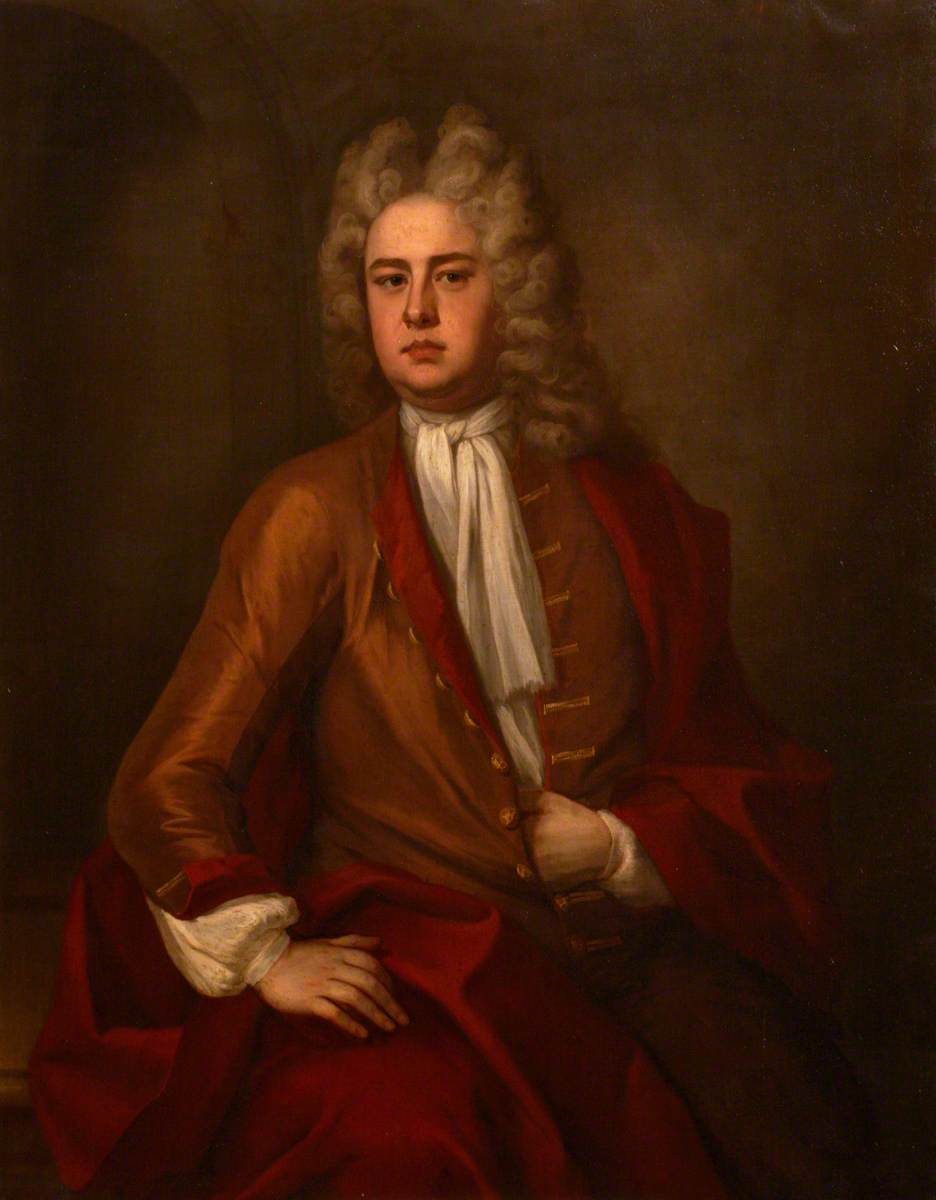
- Portrait by Michael Dahl, c. 1710

Member of Parliament for Cornwall
- In office 1713-1744

Member of Parliament for Saltash
- In office 1711-1713

Personal details
- Born: c. 1690
- Died: 1744 (aged 53–54)
- Spouse: Anne Coventry (m. 1714)
- Children: 1+, including Coventry
- Parent: John Carew (father)
- Relatives: William Morice (grandfather); Alexander Carew (grandfather)
- Education: Exeter College, Oxford

Sir William Carew, 5th Baronet (c. 1690–1744) was a British politician who sat in the House of Commons from 1711 to 1744.

== Biography ==
Carew was the second son of Sir John Carew, 3rd Baronet and his third wife Mary Morice, daughter of Sir William Morice, 1st Baronet of Werrington, Devon and was baptized on 24 January 1690. He succeeded his elder brother in the baronetcy on 24 September 1703. He matriculated at Exeter College, Oxford on 4 September 1707 aged 18.

On 5 January 1714, Carew married Lady Anne Coventry, daughter of Gilbert Coventry, 4th Earl of Coventry. She was an heiress, and he then had work started on Antony House in Cornwall.

Carew was returned as Member of Parliament for Saltash at a by-election on 17 January 1711. At the 1713 general election he was returned instead as MP for Cornwall. He was re-elected MP for Cornwall in the general elections of 1715, 1722, 1727, 1734 and 1741.

Carew died on 8 March 1744. He was succeeded in the baronetcy by his son Coventry.

Parliament of Great Britain
Preceded by Jonathan Elford; Alexander Pendarves	Member of Parliament for Saltash; 1711–1713; With: Jonathan Elford	Succeeded by Jonathan Elford; William Shippen
Preceded by Sir Richard Vyvyan, Bt; John Trevanion	Member of Parliament for Cornwall; 1713–1744; With: John Trevanion 1713–1722; Sir John St Aubyn, Bt 1722–1744	Succeeded by Sir Coventry Carew, Bt; Sir John St Aubyn, Bt
Baronetage of England
Preceded by Richard Carew	Baronet (of Anthony); 1703–1744	Succeeded by Coventry Carew
