= Portrait of Francis Basset (Prado) =

Painting by Pompeo Batoni

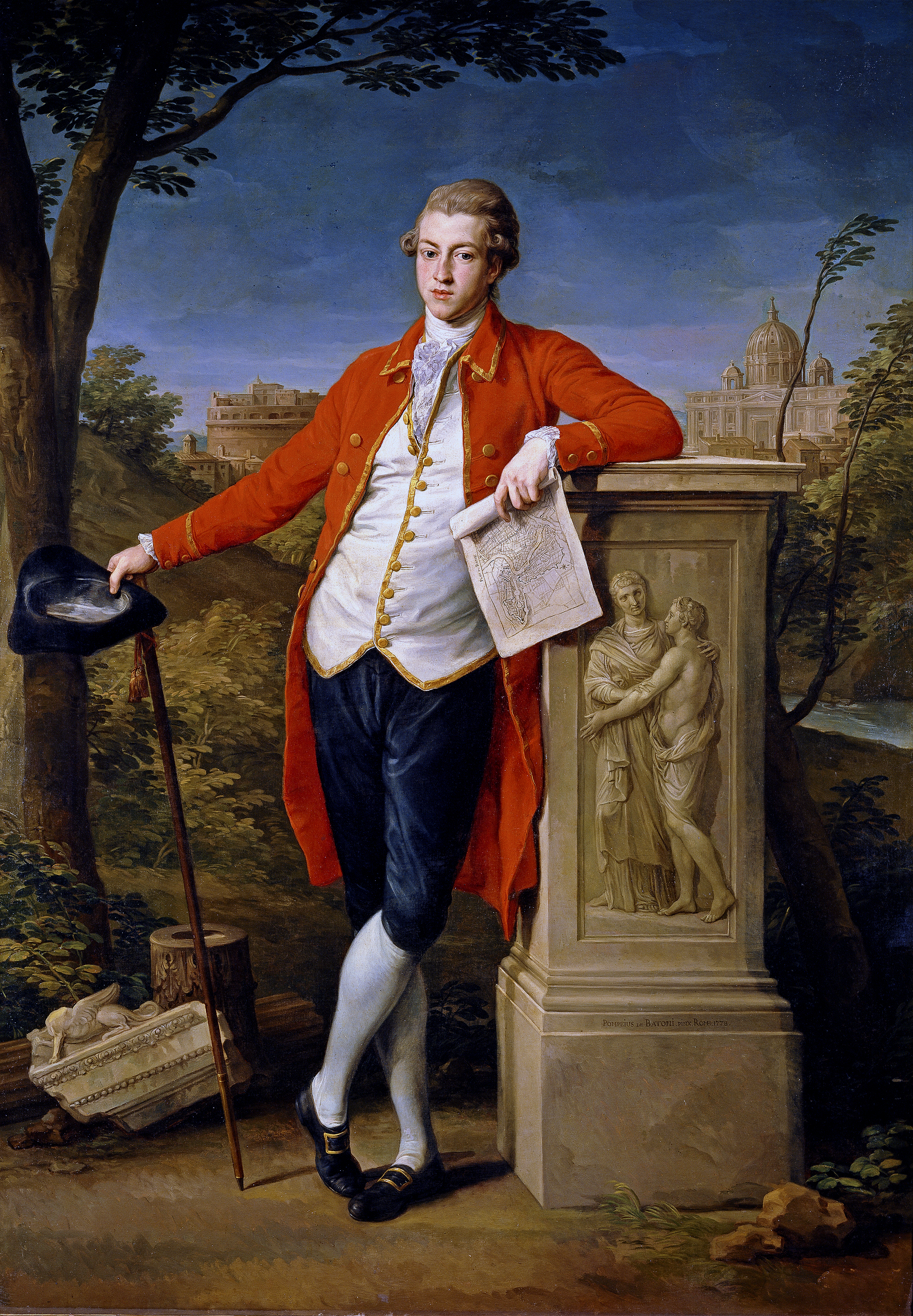
- Artist: Pompeo Batoni
- Year: 1778
- Type: Oil on canvas, portrait painting
- Dimensions: 221 cm × 157 cm (87 in × 62 in)
- Location: Museo del Prado; Madrid

Portrait of Francis Basset is a 1778 portrait painting by the Italian artist Pompeo Batoni depicting the young English Grand Tourist Francis Basset, the future Baron de Dunstanville. Batoni was a Rome-based artist who specialised in painting wealthy Britons on the Grand Tour. The background features the landmarks the Castel Sant'Angelo and St. Peter's Basilica.

It was probably the only full-length portrait the prolific Batoni produced that year. There is a related work, not full-length, which is possibly by Batoni, but is sometimes attributed to his studio.

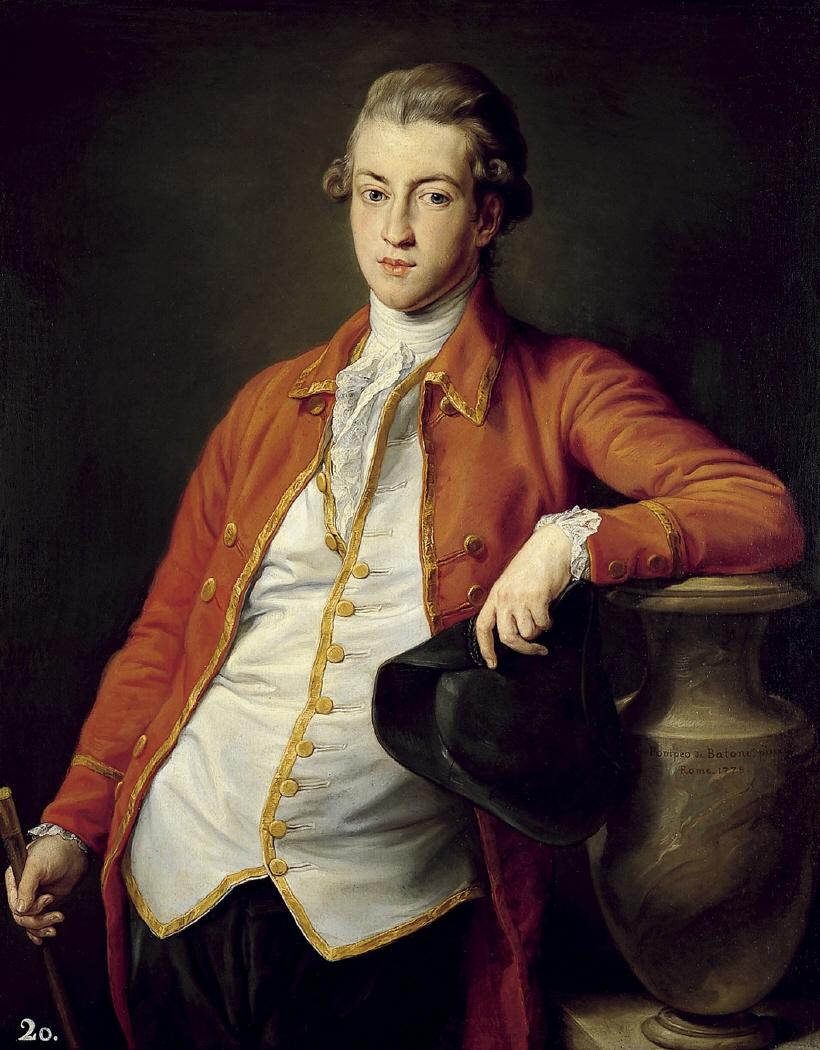

The two portraits were among a number of art works onboard the frigate Westmorland when it was taken by French ships during the American Revolutionary War. The Spanish then took possession of the cargo. In the 1780s, insurers paid out on art taken with the Westmorland, and Basset, who had presumably given up hope of retrieving his Italian portraits, commissioned a portrait from Gainsborough.

The Batoni is now in the collection of the Museo del Prado in Madrid, and has been on loan to various exhibitions. In 2024/25 the painting was on loan to an exhibition in Malaga about the art works on the Westmorland.

== Bibliography ==
- Bowron, Edgar Peters & Kerber, Peter Björn. Pompeo Batoni: Prince of Painters in Eighteenth-century Rome. Yale University Press, 2007.
- Coltman, Viccu. Classical Sculpture and the Culture of Collecting in Britain Since 1760. Oxford University Press, 2009.
- Walsh, Linda. A Guide to Eighteenth-Century Art. John Wiley & Sons, 2016.
