= Portrait of Humphry Morice =

Painting by Pompeo Batoni

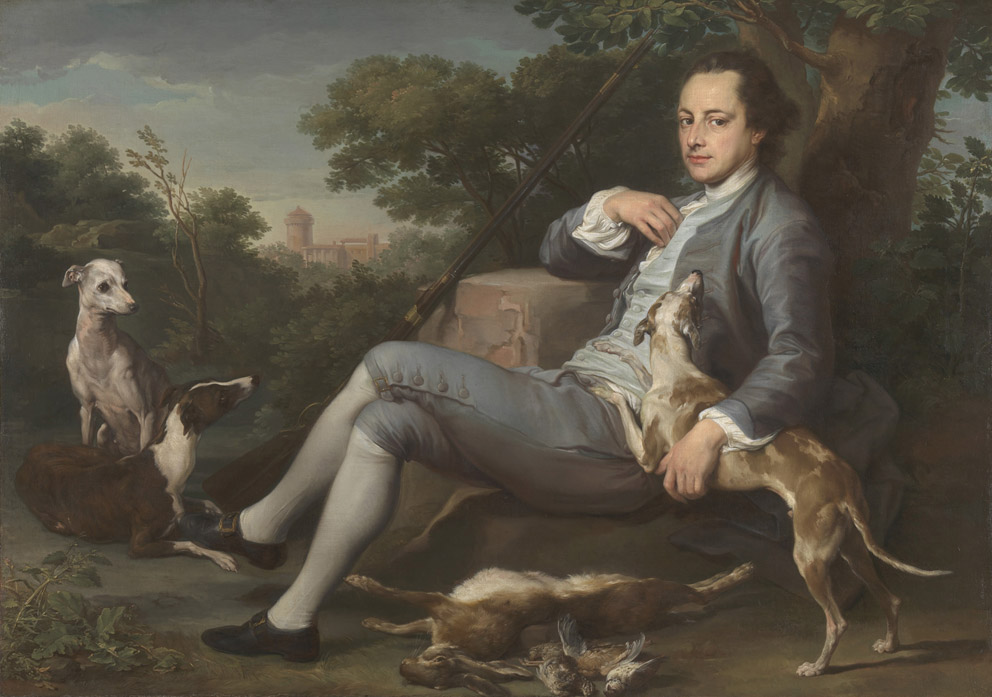
- Artist: Pompeo Batoni
- Year: 1761–62
- Medium: Oil on canvas
- Dimensions: 117,5 cm × 172,8 cm (463 in × 680 in)
- Location: Private collection, National Gallery (loan), London

Portrait of Humphry Morice is an oil-on-canvas painting by the Italian artist Pompeo Batoni, from 1761-1762. It depicts the Englishman Humphry Morice. It is now in a private collection, although it is on display in the National Gallery, in London. A signed 1762 autograph copy of the work entered the collection of Sir James and Lady Graham at Norton Conyers and is now on display at Basildon Park as part of National Trust collection.

Morice made three trips to Italy on business and was one of Batoni's main patrons. The painting, which was produced on the second trip, depicts Morice resting in the countryside with three whippets after a hunt. In the background are the Torre Leonina and the Torre dei Venti.
