= Sir Coventry Carew, 6th Baronet =

British Tory politician and baronet

Member of Parliament for Cornwall
- In office 1744-1748

Personal details
- Born: c. 1716
- Died: 24 March 1748 (aged 31–32)
- Political party: Tories
- Spouse: Mary Bampfylde (m. 1738)
- Parent: William Carew (father)
- Relatives: John Carew (grandfather)
- Education: Balliol College, Oxford

Sir Coventry Carew, 6th Baronet (c.1716 – 24 March 1748) was a British Tory politician.

== Biography ==
Carew was the son of Sir William Carew, 5th Baronet and Lady Anne Coventry, daughter of Gilbert Coventry, 4th Earl of Coventry. He was educated at Balliol College, Oxford. On 1 July 1738 he married Mary, daughter of Sir Coplestone Bampfylde, 3rd Baronet. He succeeded to his father's baronetcy in 1744.

In 1744, Carew was elected as a Tory Member of Parliament for Cornwall. In 1746 he voted against the use of the Hanoverian Army to suppress the Jacobite rising of 1745. He died in 1748.

Parliament of Great Britain
| Preceded by Sir William Carew, Bt; Sir John St Aubyn, Bt | Member of Parliament for Saltash; 1744–1748; With: Sir John St Aubyn, Bt (1744); Sir John Molesworth, Bt (1744–1748) | Succeeded by James Buller; Sir John Molesworth, Bt |
Baronetage of England
| Preceded by William Carew | Baronet (of Anthony); 1744–1748 | Succeeded by John Carew |
