= George Lee (English politician) =

English Whig politician

Sir George Lee PC
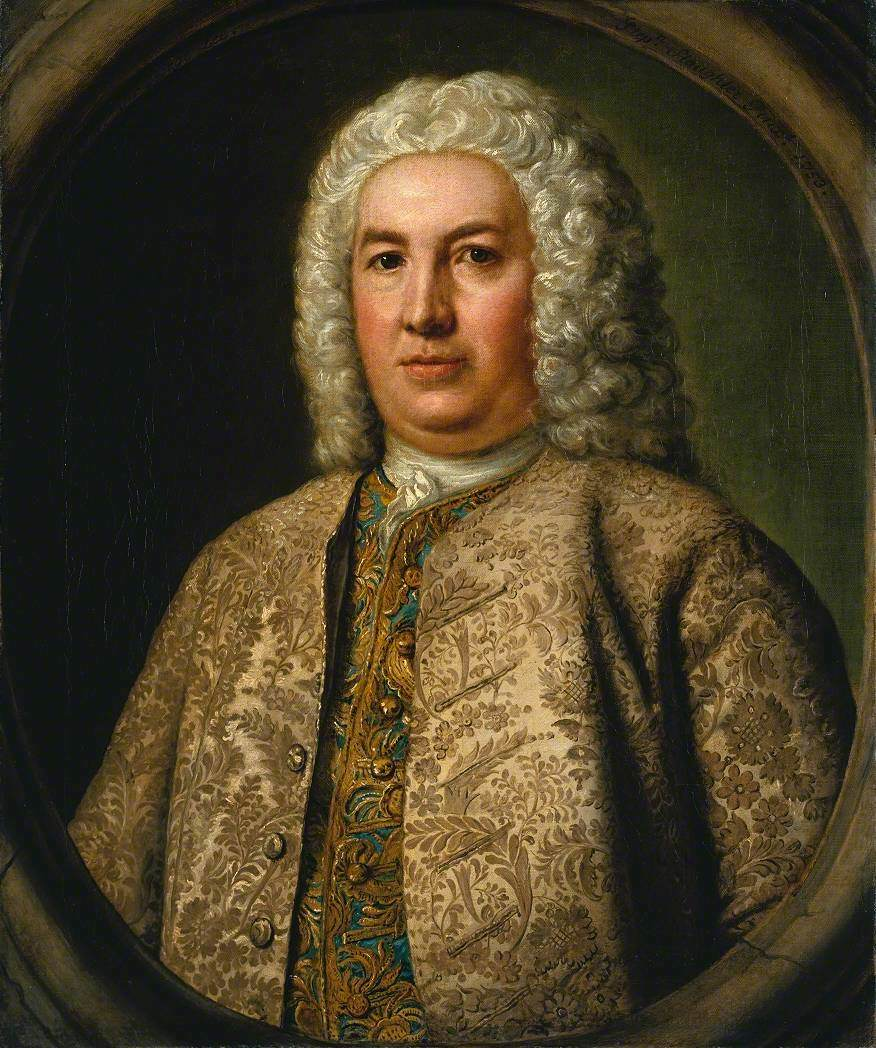

Member of Parliament (MP) for Brackley
- In office 1733–1742

Member of Parliament (MP) for Devizes
- In office 1742–1747

Member of Parliament (MP) for Liskeard
- In office 1747–1754

Member of Parliament (MP) for Launceston
- In office 1754–1758

Personal details
- Born: c. 1700
- Died: 18 December 1758

Sir George Lee, PC (c. 1700 – 18 December 1758) was an English Whig politician who sat in the House of Commons for 25 years from 1733 to 1758.

== Life ==
Lee was fifth son of Sir Thomas Lee, 2nd Baronet, who had married Alice Hopkins, daughter and coheiress of Thomas Hopkins, of London. His elder brother was Sir William Lee, the judge. He entered Clare College, Cambridge in 1716, but migrated to Christ Church, Oxford, where he matriculated on 4 April 1720. He took the degrees of B.C.L. in 1724 and D.C.L. in 1729. On 23 October 1729 he was admitted advocate at Doctors' Commons and soon obtained a practice.

Lee was returned as Whig Member of Parliament (MP) for Brackley by the Duke of Bridgwater at a by-election on 25 January 1733. He was returned unopposed at the 1741 British general election but resigned the seat on appointment to office in March 1742 and was the returned as MP for Devizes at a by-election on 23 July 1742. At the 1747 British general election he was returned instead as MP for Liskeard. At the 1754 British general election, he was returned unopposed as MP for Launceston by his brother-in-law, Humphry Morice.

From 1742 to 1744, Lee was a Lord of the Admiralty, and knighted and sworn as a Privy Councillor in 1752. From 1751 to 1757 he was treasurer to Augusta, Princess of Wales.

In 1757, Lee resigned his position as treasurer to the princess dowager in consequence of the rise into favour of Lord Bute, but his defection attracted little notice, as the princess's adherents had for some time slackened in their opposition to the ministry. When the Duke of Newcastle proposed to form an administration, with the exclusion of Pitt from office, Lee reluctantly agreed to be Chancellor of the Exchequer but the duke, almost at once and without the least notice to those who had agreed to join him, abandoned his scheme.

On 18 December, Lee died suddenly at his house in St. James's Square, London, and was buried on 28 December in the family vault underneath the east end of Hartwell Church, Buckinghamshire.

== Family ==
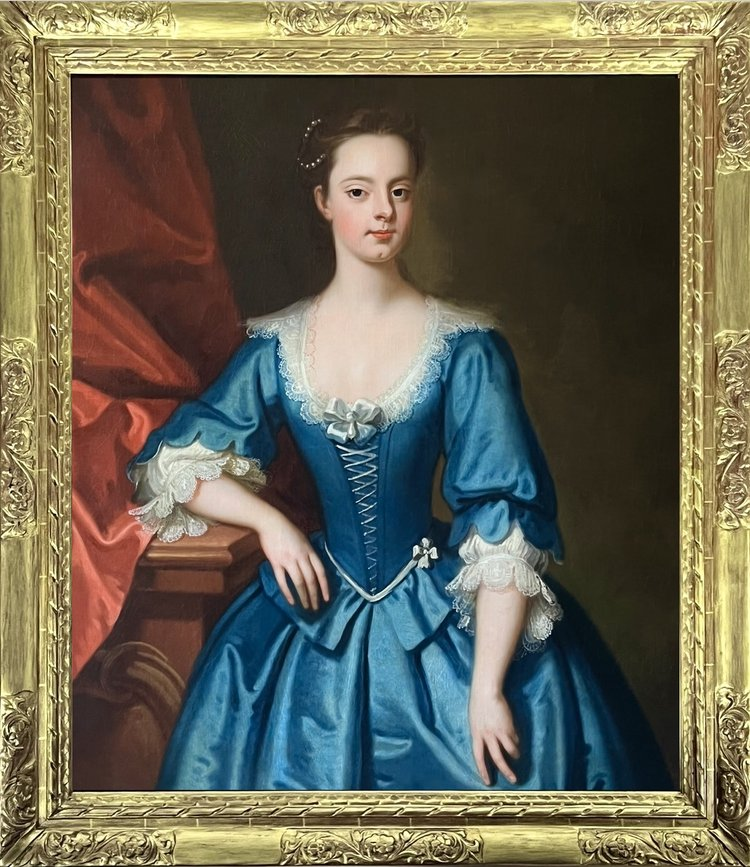
Judith Morice, portrait attributed to Enoch Seeman

He married, on 5 June 1742, Judith, the second daughter of Humphry Morice of Werrington, near Launceston, Cornwall, by his wife, a daughter of Thomas Sandys of London. She died on 19 July 1743, aged 33, and was buried on 1 August in the vault of the Lee family in Hartwell Church.

Sir George died without issue, and left all his fortune to his nephew, Sir William Lee, 4th baronet.

== Notes ==
Parliament of the United Kingdom
Preceded by William Egerton; Sir Paul Methuen	Member of Parliament for Brackley with Sir Paul Methuen; 1733–1742	Succeeded by Sewallis Shirley; Sir Paul Methuen
Preceded by Francis Eyles; John Garth	Member of Parliament for Devizes with John Garth; 1742–1747	Succeeded by William Willy; John Garth
Preceded by Richard Eliot; Charles Trelawny	Member of Parliament for Liskeard with Charles Trelawny; 1747–1754	Succeeded by Edmund Nugent; Philip Stanhope
Preceded by Humphry Morice; Sir John St Aubyn	Member of Parliament for Launceston with Humphry Morice; 1754–1758	Succeeded by Humphry Morice; Sir John St Aubyn
