= Westmorland (ship) =

History

Great Britain
- Name: Westmorland
- Captured: By French (1779); later recaptured

General characteristics
- Sail plan: Full-rigged ship
- Armament: 26 guns

Westmorland or Westmoreland (Note: Sometimes referred to as HMS Westmoreland/Westmorland. However, according to Ships of the Royal Navy, like most other privateers she was never actually commissioned into the Royal Navy.) was a 26-gun British privateer frigate, operating in the Mediterranean Sea against French shipping in retaliation for France's opposition to Great Britain in the American Revolutionary War.

== Service history ==
The most notable incident in the life of the Westmorland occurred shortly after she sailed for Britain from Livorno under Captain Michael Wallace late in 1778, carrying a large monetary payment for her inbound cargo of salt cod from Newfoundland (Livorno was a trade hub for this commodity), food goods, (Note: These included almost 4000 barrels of anchovies, 129 pounds of silk, 150 crates of manna and oil, thirty-four bales of hemp, thirty-two Parmesan cheeses, twenty-two barrels of Tartar salt and medicines and five crates of artificial flowers.) and 57 crates of artistic objects collected by Grand Tourists such as the Duke of Gloucester, Sir John Henderson and the Duke of Norfolk. (Note: Including Batoni's portrait of Charles Cecil Roberts and a second portrait called An English Gentleman; sculptures by Albacini and Christopher Hewetson; a marble chimney originally destined for the Duke of Gloucester; musical scores, violins, violin strings, hats (two barrels), ornamental fans, expensive books; Piranesi sketches; specimens of lava from Mount Vesuvius sent by William Hamilton; relics; paintings by Pompeo Batoni, Anton Raphael Mengs, Carlo Maratta, Guido Reni, and Guercino, among others; modern copies of Raphael's paintings; drawings by artists working in Rome, including John Robert Cozens; 23 crates of ancient Roman marble statues and fragments, plus modern plaster casts; other carved marble mantelpieces, slabs of coloured marble for table-tops, full-sized Piranesi-like "vasi candelabri", 84 rolls of deluxe blank Genoa paper, a crate of flowering onion bulbs and seeds; boxes of pomade, sweetmeats and citrus-blossom water, four barrels of Madeira, and a double-barreled rifle.)

In January 1779, she was given chase by four French ships, comprising two men-of-war, the Caton (64) and Destin (74), and two smaller vessels. Wallace attempted to outsail them but, outgunned as he was, soon felt he had little option but to allow the French to board his ship. She was then allowed by Spain (then friendly with France though not yet — in formal terms at least — at war with Britain) to continue to Málaga.

The Westmorland was renamed, re-commissioned into the Spanish fleet, but eventually re-taken in the Caribbean by the British.

== Fate of the art works ==
At Málaga her artistic contents were passed on from the French government to two trading companies with links to Ireland, despite Wallace's protests that the ship was full of "extremely precious goods" (the French had already seized her cash cargo), and the Spanish king was informed by his prime minister, José Moñino, 1st Count of Floridablanca, of the arrival of the art works. Upon Spain's formal declaration of war, king Charles III secretly bought the art from a syndicate of Madrid merchants for 360,000 silver reales (a discount on their original asking price of 600,000 gold doubloons, but still a considerable sum) and had it brought by cart to the capital. Portraits of Francis Basset, 1st Baron de Dunstanville and Lord Lewisham, meanwhile, were acquired by the Spanish Prime Minister.

Although the British consul at Cádiz had initially informed the British Admiralty that the Westmorland and her cargo had been seized as legitimate prizes, demands followed from the British ambassador, firmly backed at cabinet level, for the repatriation of the art and (in a prisoner exchange for French and Spanish prisoners taken by the Royal Navy) the crew of the Westmorland. However, in 1784, the £100,000 for which the art had been insured at Livorno were paid out in London.

To this day, these coveted artistic treasures remain the possession of the Prado Museum, the Real Academia, and other Spanish national collections. There were only a few exceptions: a package of Catholic relics intended for the Duke of Norfolk (which the Spanish returned unopened to the Vatican); Sir Watkin Williams Wynn's Perseus and Andromeda by Mengs, which ended up in the collection of Catherine the Great at the Hermitage Museum and some items which were sent to Mexico, then a Spanish colony. For a long time it was difficult to identify precisely many of the items held in Spain. For example, paintings had been assigned generalised titles such as "A traveller in Italy". Recent research into the original lists in Spain has made more precise identification possible, cataloguing for example items from the collection of Francis Basset, 1st Baron de Dunstanville, including his two portraits.

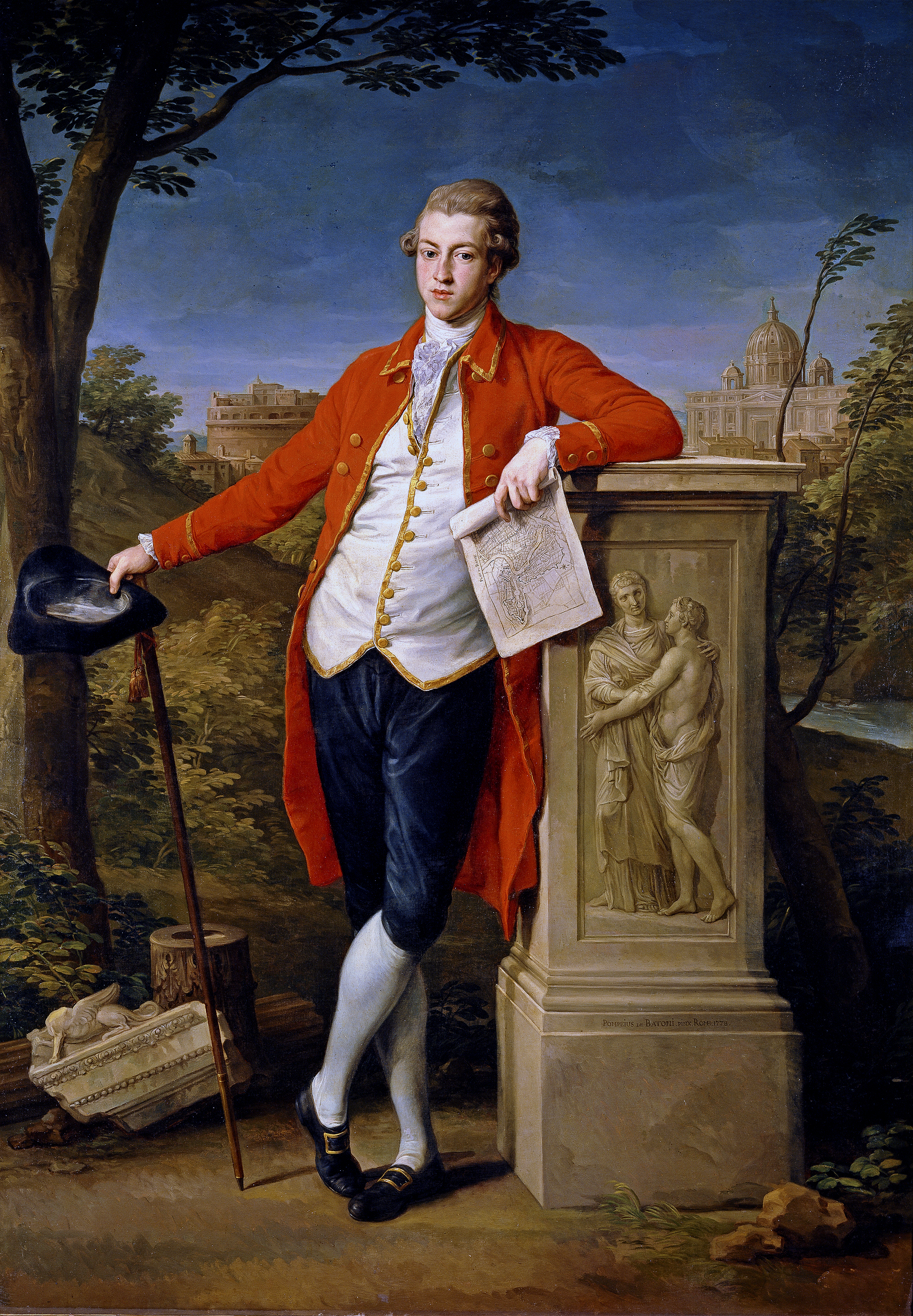
Portrait of Francis Basset by Pompeo Batoni, 1778 - one of the paintings captured from the Westmorland (Prado)

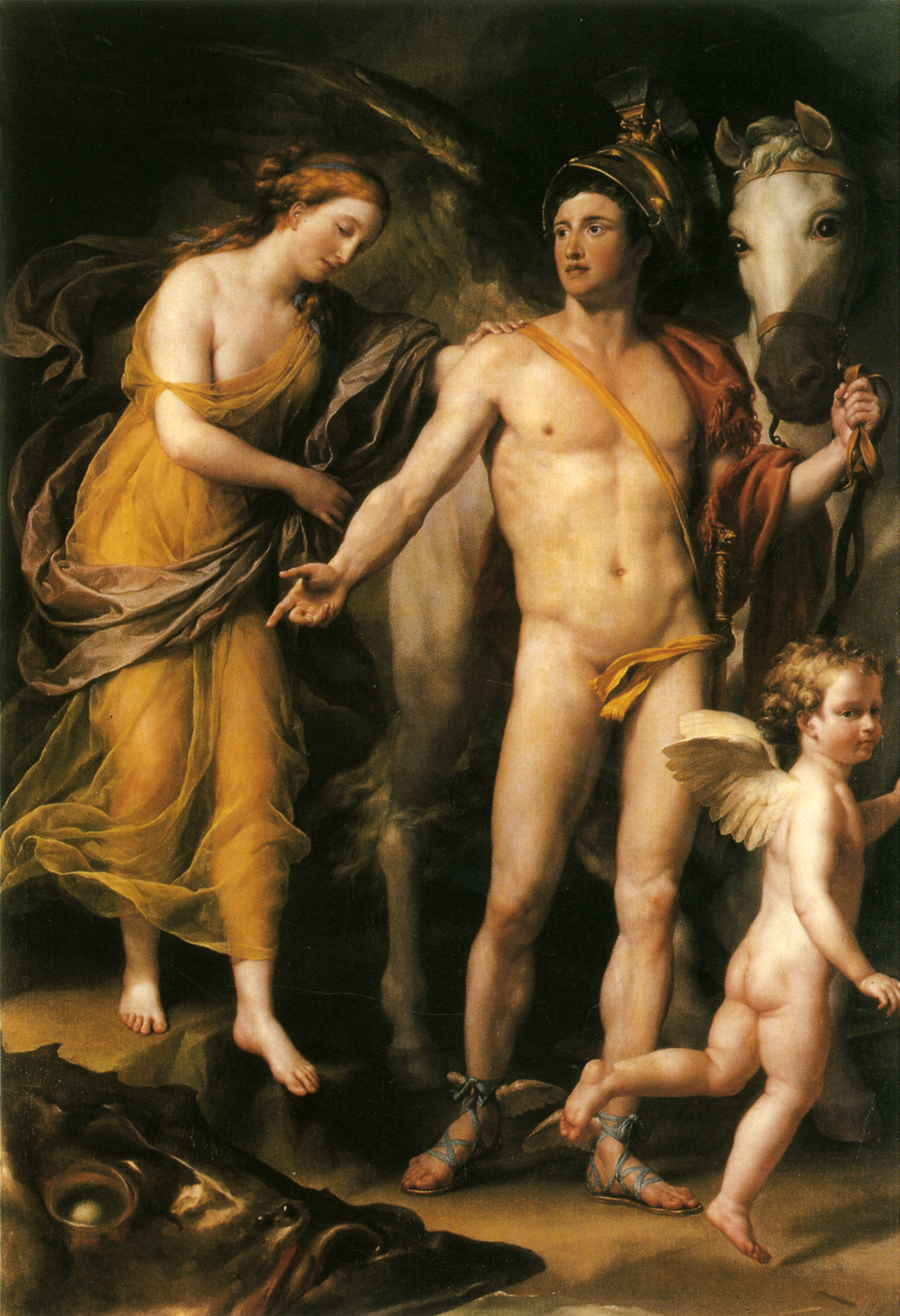
Perseus And Andromeda by Mengs, another painting captured from the Westmorland (Hermitage)

=== Exhibitions ===
In 2012 an exhibition of many of the art works captured was held at the Ashmolean Museum at Oxford University, and then traveled to the Yale Center for British Art in New Haven, United States. In 2024 an exhibition entitled "El Westmorland en Málaga" was held in the former Bishop's Palace of Málaga under the auspices of Unicaja Bank's cultural foundation and the Real Academia de Bellas Artes de San Fernando.

== Sources ==
- Sánchez-Jáuregui, Maria Dolores, and Wilcox, Scott. The English Prize: The Capture of the Westmorland, An Episode of the Grand Tour. New Haven, CT: Yale University Press, 2012. ISBN 978-0300176056.
- Sánchez-Jáuregui, Maria Dolores. "Two Portraits of Francis Basset by Pompeo Batoni in Madrid". The Burlington Magazine, Vol. 143, No. 1180 (Jul 2001), pp. 420–425.
- Trumble, Angus. "Pirates of the Mediterranean: Mining the Cargo of the Westmorland in Madrid". Trinity Today, December 2007, pp 14 to 15
- Tremlett, Giles. 'Spaniards looted British art hoard' The Times, 1999.
