= Baron Basset =

Barony in the Peerage of Great Britain

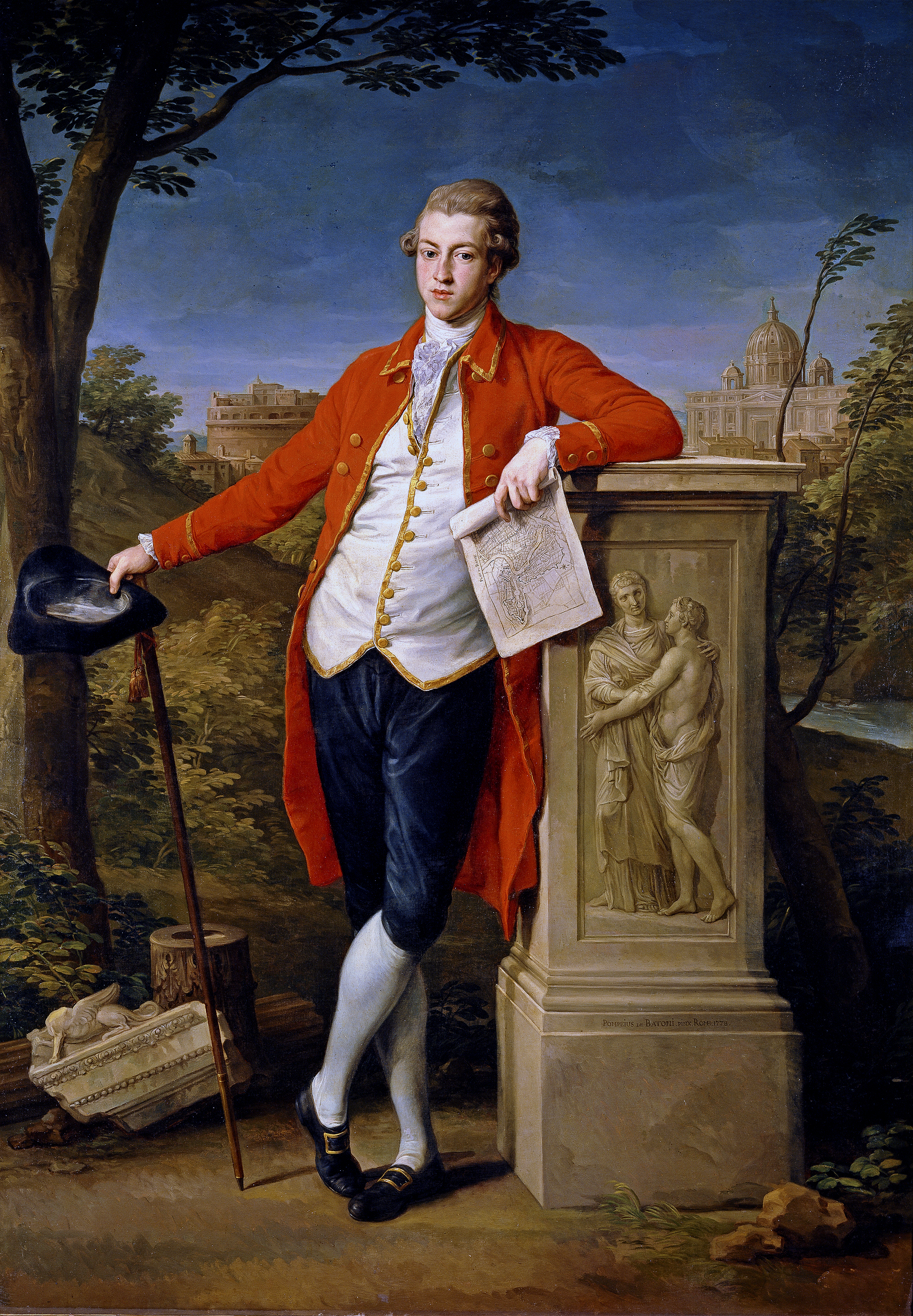
Francis Basset, 1st Baron de Dunstanville and Basset, in 1778 on the Grand Tour in Rome, with the Castel Sant'Angelo and St. Peter's Basilica in the background. Portrait of Francis Basset by Pompeo Batoni (Prado).

Baron Basset, of Stratton in the County of Cornwall, was a title in the Peerage of Great Britain. It was created in 1797 for Francis Basset, 1st Baron de Dunstanville, with remainder, failing heirs male of his own, to his daughter the Honourable Frances Basset. He had already been created a baronet, of Tehidy in the County of Cornwall, in the Baronetage of Great Britain in 1779, and Baron de Dunstanville, of Tehidy in the County of Cornwall, in the Peerage of Ireland in 1796. Both these titles were created with normal remainder to heirs male. Lord de Dunstanville and Basset was the eldest son of Francis Basset. The baronetcy and barony of de Dunstanville became extinct on his death in 1835 while he was succeeded in the barony of Basset according to the special remainder by his daughter, Frances, the second Baroness Basset. She never married and the barony became extinct on her death in 1855.

The choice of "de Dunstanville" as a title recalls the name of Reginald de Dunstanville, who was Earl of Cornwall in the twelfth century. Adeliza de Dunstanville married Thomas Basset in the thirteeneth century.

== Baron de Dunstanville (1796) ==
- Francis Basset, 1st Baron de Dunstanville (1757–1835)

== Barons Basset (1797) ==
- Francis Basset, 1st Baron de Dunstanville, 1st Baron Basset (1757–1835)
- Frances Basset, 2nd Baroness Basset (1781–1855)

== See also ==
- Basset (family)

Baronetage of Great Britain
Preceded by Rumbold baronets	Basset baronets of Tehidy; 24 November 1779	Succeeded by Farmer baronets
