= Francis Basset, 1st Baron de Dunstanville =

British politician (1757–1835)

The Right Honourable The Lord de Dunstanville FRS
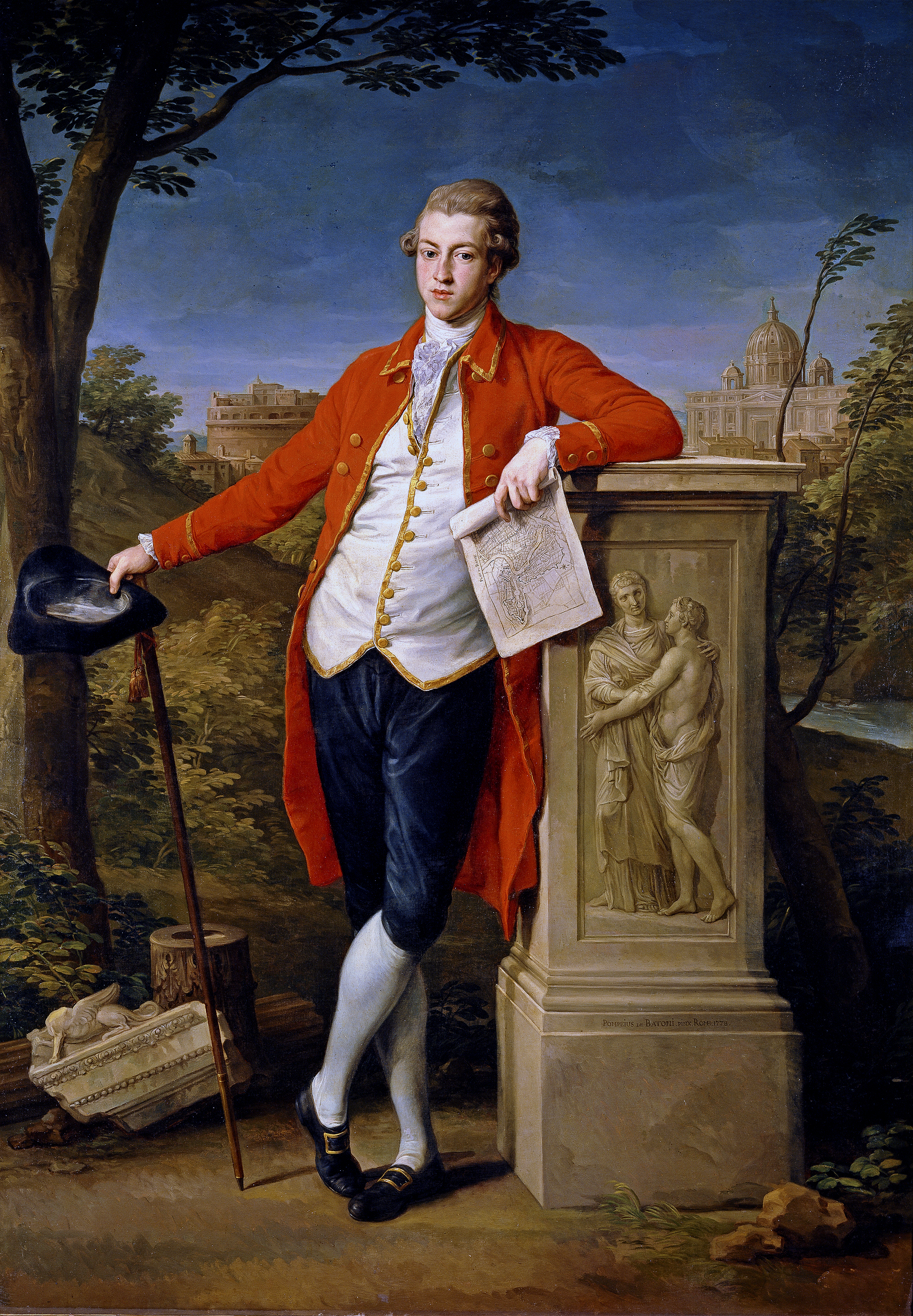
- Portrait of Francis Basset by Pompeo Batoni, 1778

Member of Parliament for Penryn
- In office 1780–1796
- Preceded by: Sir George Osborn; William Chaytor
- Succeeded by: Thomas Wallace; William Meeke

Personal details
- Born: 9 August 1757 England
- Died: 14 February 1835 (aged 77) London, England
- Spouse(s): Frances Susanna Hippesley-Coxe (m. 1780); Harriet Lemon (m. 1824)
- Children: Frances Basset, 2nd Baroness Basset
- Education: King's College, Cambridge

Francis Basset, 1st Baron de Dunstanville, FRS (9 August 1757 – 14 February 1835) was a British politician who represented Penryn in the House of Commons of Great Britain from 1780 to 1796.

== Early life ==
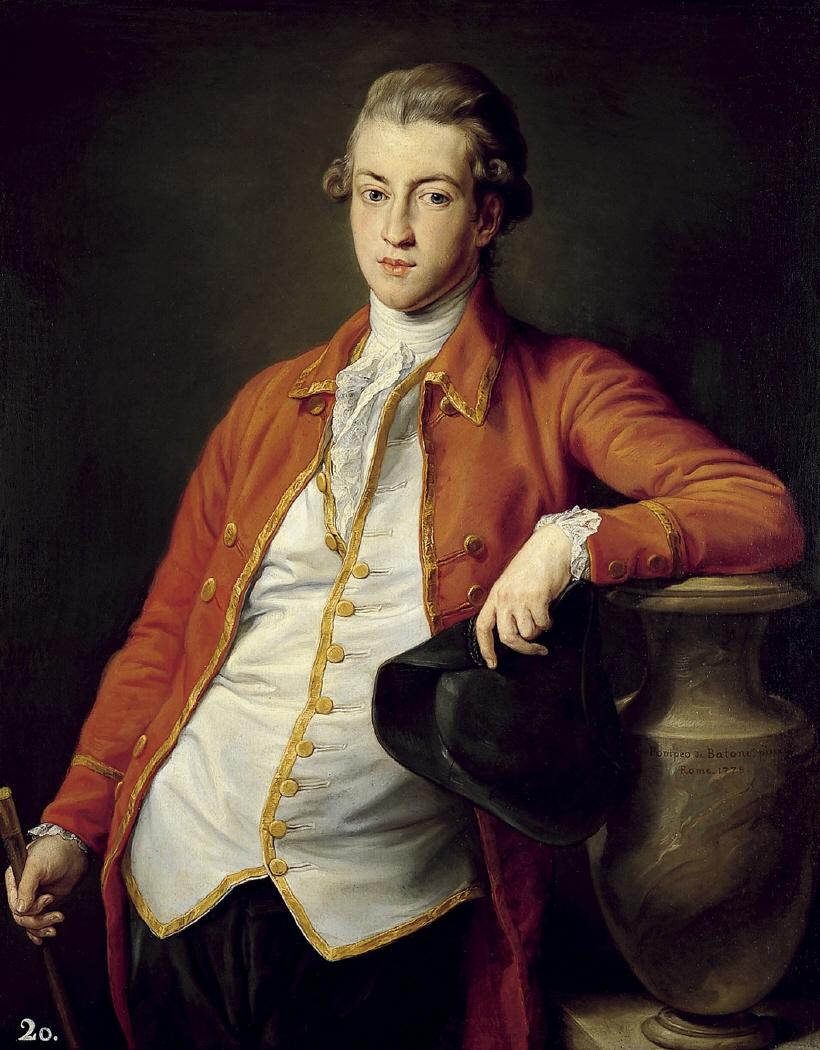
1778 portrait of Basset by Pompeo Batoni

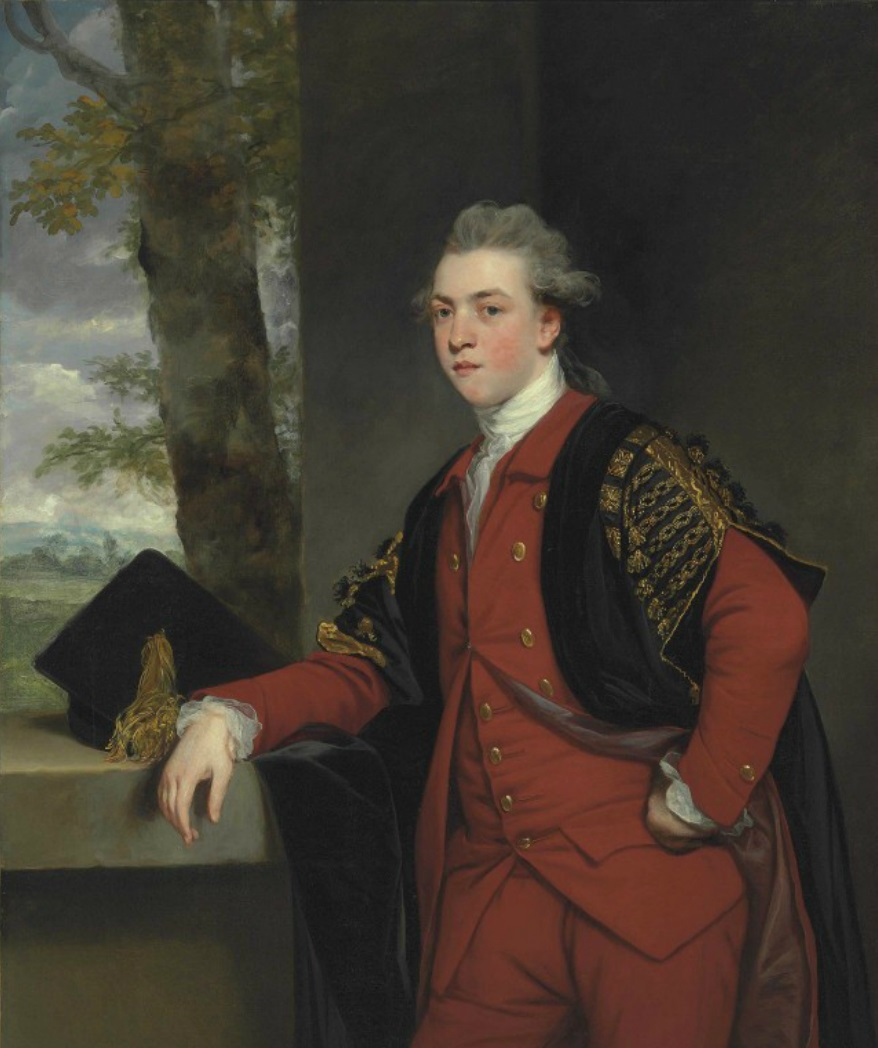
Portrait of Basset by Sir Joshua Reynolds

Basset was the eldest son and heir of Francis Basset (1715–1769) of Tehidy by his wife Margaret St. Aubyn, a daughter of Sir John St Aubyn, 3rd Baronet of Clowance in Cornwall. His was the junior branch of the Basset family, the senior line of which was seated at Umberleigh and Heanton Punchardon in North Devon, but nevertheless his Cornish branch owned more land, and from the many mineral and tin mines within its possessions, it amassed great wealth. In 1873 (the first time such a survey had been performed) they were the fourth-largest landowner in Cornwall, as revealed by the Return of Owners of Land, 1873, with 16,969 acres, after the Rashleigh family of Menabilly (30,156 acres), the Boscawens of Tregothnan (25,910 acres) and the Robartes of Lanhydrock (22,234 acres). Dolcoath, one of the richest copper mines in Britain, belonged to the Cornish Bassets. Competition from Welsh mines forced Francis to close it in 1787, but the improving market for copper allowed him to reopen it in 1799. A shrewd businessman, he was a partner in the Cornish Bank of Truro and chairman of the Cornish Metal Company, and added to his already large fortune as a result.

== Career ==
Basset was baptized at Charlbury, Oxfordshire on 7 September 1757 and was educated at Harrow School (1770–71), Eton College (1771–74) and King's College, Cambridge (1775). In 1777 he left university early to perform a Grand Tour in Italy, with Rev. William Sandys acting as his Cicerone. In Rome, he had his portrait painted by Pompeo Batoni, who did not finish it until after Basset's departure. It was despatched to England on board the Westmorland, which was seized by the French and sold to the Spanish. Two portraits of him by Batoni are today in the collections of the Prado and the Royal Academy of Fine Arts of San Fernando, Madrid.

He returned to England in 1778, and partly due to his family's great influence in Cornwall, was appointed to the honourable position of Recorder of Penryn in Cornwall. Like his father, he served as a Member of Parliament for his family's pocket borough of Penryn in Cornwall (in 1760 his father was possessed of 82 tenements in the borough, 36 more in the parish, and about 60 of his tenants were electors), which seat he held between 1780 and 1796. The constituency returned two MPs, and the other, also elected due to the Basset family's control of the borough, was at some time his first cousin Sir John St Aubyn, 5th Baronet.

At 21, Basset was made a Freemason on 12 Apr 1779, at Somerset House L. No. 2.

In August 1779 (Note: The History of Parliament biography describes him as lieutenant-colonel of the North Devon Militia in this year, but an ode published in the Gentleman's Magazine of November 1802, p. 1048, makes it clear that it was his distant senior cousin Francis Basset (1740–1802) of Heanton Punchardon in North Devon who held this post.) as part of the national move to counter a Franco-Spanish invasion fleet gathered in connection with the American War of Independence, he marched 600 Cornish miners to Plymouth and strengthened that town's defences and fortified Portreath. As a reward, he was created by the King a Baronet, "of Tehidy, County Cornwall" on 24 November 1779.

Following his marriage in 1780, he finally graduated from King's College as a Master of Arts in 1786. He purchased Radnor House on the banks of the River Thames in Twickenham, which he owned from 1785 until 1793.

He was one of the dominant political figures in Cornwall, rivalled in influence only by Viscount Falmouth and Sir Christopher Hawkins, 1st Baronet. Each of them sought to use their powers of patronage to control elections to the House of Commons (Cornwall, with 44 seats, was grossly over-represented in Parliament given its population). Basset was personally on bad terms with Hawkins, and they fought a notorious duel in 1810, although neither was injured. Not surprisingly, he was a determined opponent of electoral reform, which he saw as a threat to his own power base.

He was elevated to the peerage on 17 June 1796 as Baron de Dunstanville, and later on 30 November 1797 also as Baron Basset of Stratton, with special remainder to his daughter.

== Marriage and children ==
He married twice:

- Firstly on 16 May 1780 at St Marylebone Parish Church in London, to Frances Susanna Hippesley-Coxe (d. 14 June 1823), who pre-deceased him, a daughter of John Hippesley-Coxe of Ston Easton in Somerset, by whom he had a sole daughter and heiress:
  - Frances Basset, 2nd Baroness Basset, who inherited his second barony suo jure in accordance with the special remainder.
- Secondly on 13 July 1824 he married Harriet Lemon (1777–1864), 4th daughter of Sir William Lemon, 1st Baronet, of Carclew, by his wife Jane Buller. They had no issue.

His second marriage, when he was close to seventy, and so soon after his first wife's death, caused some derisory comment, and was generally thought to be inspired solely by the hope of producing a male heir: "the one ambition in his life which he never fulfilled". The hope of a male heir was not realised, nor did he have any grandchildren, as Frances never married.

== Death and succession ==
He died in London on 14 February 1835 without surviving male issue, whereupon his barony of de Dunstanville became extinct as did his baronetcy, while the barony of Basset passed by the special remainder to his only child, Frances Basset, 2nd Baroness Basset, his daughter by his first marriage.

The procession of his coffin from the capital to and within Cornwall had 'all the air of a State occasion' and was among the largest and well attended funerals in Cornwall. He lied ‘in state’ in Launceston, in Bodmin and in Truro, with local worthies encouraged to pay their last respects.

At Truro the shops were closed and the bell of St Mary's was tolled in his honour. The funeral itself, marked by the closure for the day of all the local mines, drew a procession of some 20,000 people from Tehidy Park to Illogan church.

== Monument ==
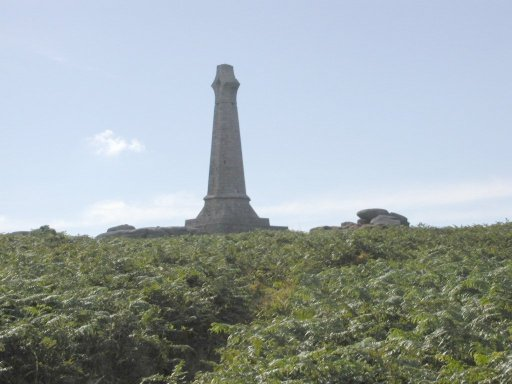
Basset Monument on Carn Brea

On the highest point of Carn Brea in Cornwall is a 90-foot (27 m) high Celtic cross, erected by public subscription in 1836. It is dedicated to Francis Basset and inscribed "The County of Cornwall to the memory of Francis Lord de Dunstanville and Basset A.D. 1836". 50°13′16″N 5°14′56″W

== Depiction in literature ==
He is a recurring character in the Poldark novels by Winston Graham, where he is shown in a generally sympathetic light. The novels describe the long-standing struggle between Basset and George Boscawen, 3rd Viscount Falmouth for political supremacy in Cornwall. This relates in part to control of the pocket borough of Penryn.

== Notes ==
Parliament of Great Britain
Preceded by Sir George Osborn; William Chaytor	Member of Parliament for Penryn; 1780–1796; With: John Rogers 1780–1782; Reginald Pole-Carew 1782–1784; Sir John St Aubyn 1784–1790; Richard Glover 1790–1796	Succeeded by Thomas Wallace; William Meeke
Peerage of Great Britain
New creation	Baron de Dunstanville; 1796–1835	Extinct
New creation	Baron Basset; 1797–1835	Succeeded by Frances Basset
Baronetage of Great Britain
New creation	Baronet (of Tehidy); 1779–1835	Extinct
