= Sir John St Aubyn, 4th Baronet =

British Tory politician from Cornwall (1726–1772)

Sir John St Aubyn, 4th Baronet (12 November 1726 – 12 October 1772), of Clowance and St Michael's Mount, was a British Tory politician.

== Biography ==
St Aubyn was the only son of Sir John St Aubyn, 3rd Baronet and Catherine Morice, daughter and coheiress of Sir Nicholas Morice, 2nd Baronet. He was educated at Oriel College, Oxford, entering the college in 1744. From his mother, St Aubyn inherited the highly valuable manor at Stoke Damerel, which included Devonport and Plymouth docks. On 17 August 1744 he succeeded to his father's baronetcy.

In 1747, St Aubyn was returned as a Tory Member of Parliament for Launceston on the interest of his uncle, Sir William Morice, 3rd Baronet. At the 1754 British general election, however, he was not given a candidacy in the seat by his Whig cousin, Humphry Morice. A 1758 by-election in the seat following the death of Sir George Lee saw St Aubyn briefly returned to the Commons for Launceston. In 1761, St Aubyn was elected to the county seat of Cornwall as a Tory. He held the seat the seat until his death in 1772, throughout which time he voted with the opposition.

Parliament of Great Britain
| Preceded by James Buller; Sir John Molesworth, Bt | Member of Parliament for Cornwall with James Buller (1761–1765); Sir John Molesworth, Bt (1765–1772); 1761–1772 | Succeeded by Sir John Molesworth, Bt; Humphrey Mackworth-Praed |
| Preceded by Sir George Lee; Humphry Morice | Member of Parliament for Launceston with Humphry Morice; 1758–1759 | Succeeded by Peter Burrell; Humphry Morice |
| Preceded by Sir William Irby; Sir William Morice, Bt | Member of Parliament for Launceston with Sir William Morice, Bt (1747–1750); Humphry Morice (1750–1754); 1747–1754 | Succeeded by Sir George Lee; Humphry Morice |
Baronetage of England
| Preceded by John St Aubyn | Baronet (of Clowance); 1744–1772 | Succeeded by John St Aubyn |
