= Carew baronets of Haccombe (1661) =

Escutcheon of the Carew baronets of Haccombe

The Carew baronetcy, of Haccombe in the County of Devon, was created in the Baronetage of England on 2 August 1661 for Thomas Carew, Member of Parliament for Tiverton.

== Carew baronets, of Haccombe (1661) ==
- Sir Thomas Carew, 1st Baronet (1632–1673)
- Sir Henry Carew, 2nd Baronet (c.1654–1695)
- Sir Henry Darrell Carew, 3rd Baronet (c.1687–c.1707)
- Sir Thomas Carew, 4th Baronet (c.1692–c.1746)
- Sir John Carew, 5th Baronet (c.1726-c.1770)
- Sir Thomas Carew, 6th Baronet (c.1755–1805)
- Sir Henry Carew, 7th Baronet (1779–1830)
- Sir Walter Palk Carew, 8th Baronet (1807–1874)
- Sir Henry Palk Carew, 9th Baronet (1870–1934)
- Sir Thomas Palk Carew, 10th Baronet (1890–1976)
- Sir Rivers Verain Carew, 11th Baronet (born 1935)

The heir apparent to the baronetcy is Gerald De Redvers Carew (born 1975), eldest living son of the 11th Baronet.

== Extended family ==
- Charles Carew, grandson of the Rev. Thomas Carew, younger son of the 6th Baronet, sat as Member of Parliament for Tiverton.
- Patrick Henry Curtis Carew (1931–2021), great-grandson of Thomas Carew (1810–1876), third son of the 7th Baronet, was a Brigadier-General in the Royal Canadian Dragoons. He was the son of Thomas Alfred Curtis Carew (1895–1970) of the 2nd Battalion, Canadian Mounted Rifles, son of Alfred Curtis Carew RN (1847–1927) of British Columbia.
