= Sir John St Aubyn, 5th Baronet =

British Member of Parliament, High Sheriff of Cornwall and Grand Master of the Freemasons

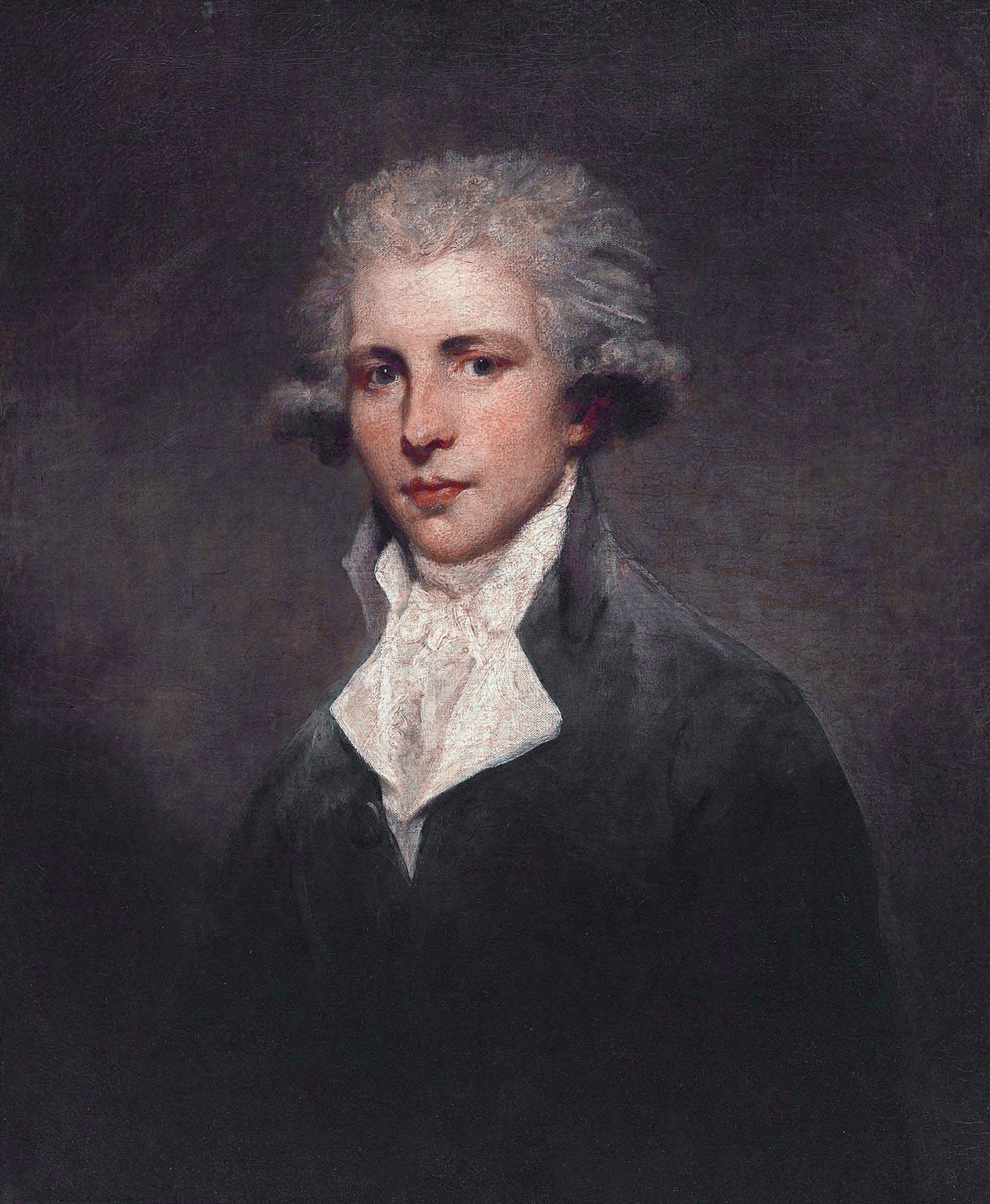
John St. Aubyn, 5th Bt., M.P. (Joshua Reynolds)

Sir John St Aubyn, 5th Baronet (17 May 1758 – 10 August 1839), was a British Member of Parliament, High Sheriff of Cornwall and Grand Master of the Freemasons. Born in London, he succeeded to the baronetcy on 12 October 1772, at which point he inherited Clowance, the family's estate near Crowan, Cornwall.

== Life ==
John St Aubyn was born on 17 May 1758 at Golden Square, London. His parents were Sir John St Aubyn, 4th Baronet, who was a Member of Parliament, and his wife, Elizabeth Wingfield; their daughter Catherine St Aubyn, two years John's junior, became an amateur artist. St Aubyn attended Westminster School between 1773 and 1777. He then spent three years in France, where he had a relationship with an Italian woman and had a daughter.

St Aubyn's father died on 12 October 1772, at which point St Aubyn succeeded to the baronetcy, inheriting Clowance, the family estate near Crowan, Cornwall. He was High Sheriff of Cornwall for 1780 and was then Member of Parliament for Truro in 1784, for Penryn from 1784 to 1790, and for Helston from 1807 to 1812. St Aubyn was also a well-known fossil collector, who in addition to his own collection purchased the large collection possessed by Richard Greene, surgeon of Lichfield (died 1793). He was elected a Fellow of the Royal Society in 1797.

From the 1790s onwards, St Aubyn had a relationship with Juliana Vinicombe (1769–1856), fathering nine children with her. He finally married Juliana on 1 July 1822: their daughter Hebe (b.1829) was the only legitimate child of the marriage.

The baronetcy became extinct on his death in August 1839, aged 81. His estate passed to his illegitimate son, James; his illegitimate son Edward was created a baronet in his own right in 1866, and was the ancestor of the Barons St Levan. He is buried at Crowan, with a monument carved by William Behnes.

Parliament of Great Britain
| Preceded by Bamber Gascoyne; John Pollexfen Bastard | Member of Parliament for Truro; 1784; With: Bamber Gascoyne | Succeeded by William Macarmick; William Augustus Spencer Boscawen |
| Preceded by Sir Francis Basset; Reginald Pole-Carew | Member of Parliament for Penryn; 1784–1790; With: Sir Francis Basset | Succeeded by Sir Francis Basset; Richard Glover |
Parliament of the United Kingdom
| Preceded by John Du Ponthieu; Thomas Brand | Member of Parliament for Helston; 1807–1812; With: Richard Richards 1807; The Lord Dufferin and Claneboye 1807–1812 | Succeeded by William Horne; Hugh Hammersley |
Baronetage of England
| Preceded by John St Aubyn | Baronet (of Clowance); 1772–1839 | Extinct |
