= Sir John St Aubyn, 1st Baronet =

English politician from Cornwall (1645–1687)

Sir John St Aubyn, 1st Baronet (1645 – June 1687) was an English politician.

St Aubyn was the eldest son of the Parliamentarian colonel, John St Aubyn, and Catherine Godolphin, daughter of Francis Godolphin. He was educated at Exeter College, Oxford.

On 11 December 1671, St Aubyn was created a baronet, of Clowance in the Baronetage of England, likely owing to the influence of his wife's brother-in-law, Sir Nicholas Slanning, 1st Baronet. St Aubyn held various local offices in Cornwall, including as a commissioner for assessment (1673–80), commissioner for recusants (1675), and justice of the peace. He was elected as a Member of Parliament for Mitchell at both elections in 1679. He voted against the first Exclusion Bill and was not appointed to any committees in parliament. He died in June 1687 and was succeeded in his title by his eldest son, John St Aubyn.

Parliament of England
| Preceded by Humphrey Borlase; Lord Hawley | Member of Parliament for Mitchell with Walter Vincent; 1679 | Succeeded by Sir William Russell; Henry Vincent |
Baronetage of England
| New creation | Baronet (of Clowance); 1671–1687 | Succeeded by John St Aubyn |
