= Catherine St Aubyn =

British artist (1760–1836)

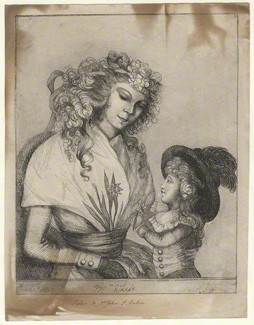
Mrs White (née St Aubyn) and child by St Aubyn, published 1789

Catherine St Aubyn Molesworth (2 September 1760 – 21 October 1836) was a British amateur artist.

== Life ==
Catherine St Aubyn was born in London, where she was baptised the same day at St James's Church, Piccadilly. She was the daughter of Sir John St Aubyn, 4th Baronet of Clowance, Cornwall, and his wife, Elizabeth Wingfield. Her brother was the long-serving Member of Parliament and fossil collector Sir John St Aubyn, 5th Baronet. Her father was a friend and patron of the painter John Opie, and he arranged for Catherine to have lessons. Her work is rare but there are a few of her works at St Michael's Mount.

She married on 26 June 1790 her cousin the Reverend John Molesworth who was the rector of St Breock in Cornwall. Her son inherited her share of the St Aubyn estates when she died in 1836. There is a window in the transept of St Breock Church with the inscription "In memory of the Rev. John Molesworth, rector of this parish, who was buried in the chancel, Sept., 26th 1811, and of Catherine Molesworth, his wife, daughter of Sir John St. Aubyn, Bart., of Clowance."

She died in 1836.
