= Carew baronets =

Set index for Carew baronets

There have been three baronetcies created for persons with the surname Carew, two in the Baronetage of England, and one in the Baronetage of Great Britain.

- Carew baronets of Antony (1641)
- Carew baronets of Haccombe (1661)
- Carew baronets of Beddington (1715)
