= Sir John St Aubyn, 2nd Baronet =

English Tory politician from Cornwall (1670–1714)

Sir John St Aubyn, 2nd Baronet (13 January 1670 – 20 June 1714), of Clowance and St Michael's Mount, was an English Tory politician.

St Aubyn was the son of Sir John St Aubyn, 1st Baronet and Anne Jenkyn. He was elected as a Member of Parliament for Helston in the 1689 English general election. In the Convention Parliament, he voted against declaring the throne vacant following the flight of James II of England the previous year, and he was elected again for Helston in 1690. In March 1690, he was listed by Lord Carmarthen as being a Tory and a supporter of the court. He made little impact on parliamentary proceedings and was frequently granted leave of absence from the Commons. He did not seek re-election at the 1695 English general election, but did serve as High Sheriff of Cornwall in 1704–5. He died in 1714 and was succeeded in his title by his eldest son, John St Aubyn.

Parliament of England
Preceded by Sidney Godolphin; Charles Godolphin	Member of Parliament for Helston with Charles Godolphin; 1689–1695	Succeeded by Francis Godolphin; Charles Godolphin
Baronetage of England
Preceded by John St Aubyn	Baronet (of Clowance); 1687–1714	Succeeded by John St Aubyn
