= St Aubyn baronets =

Baronetcy in the Baronetage of the United Kingdom

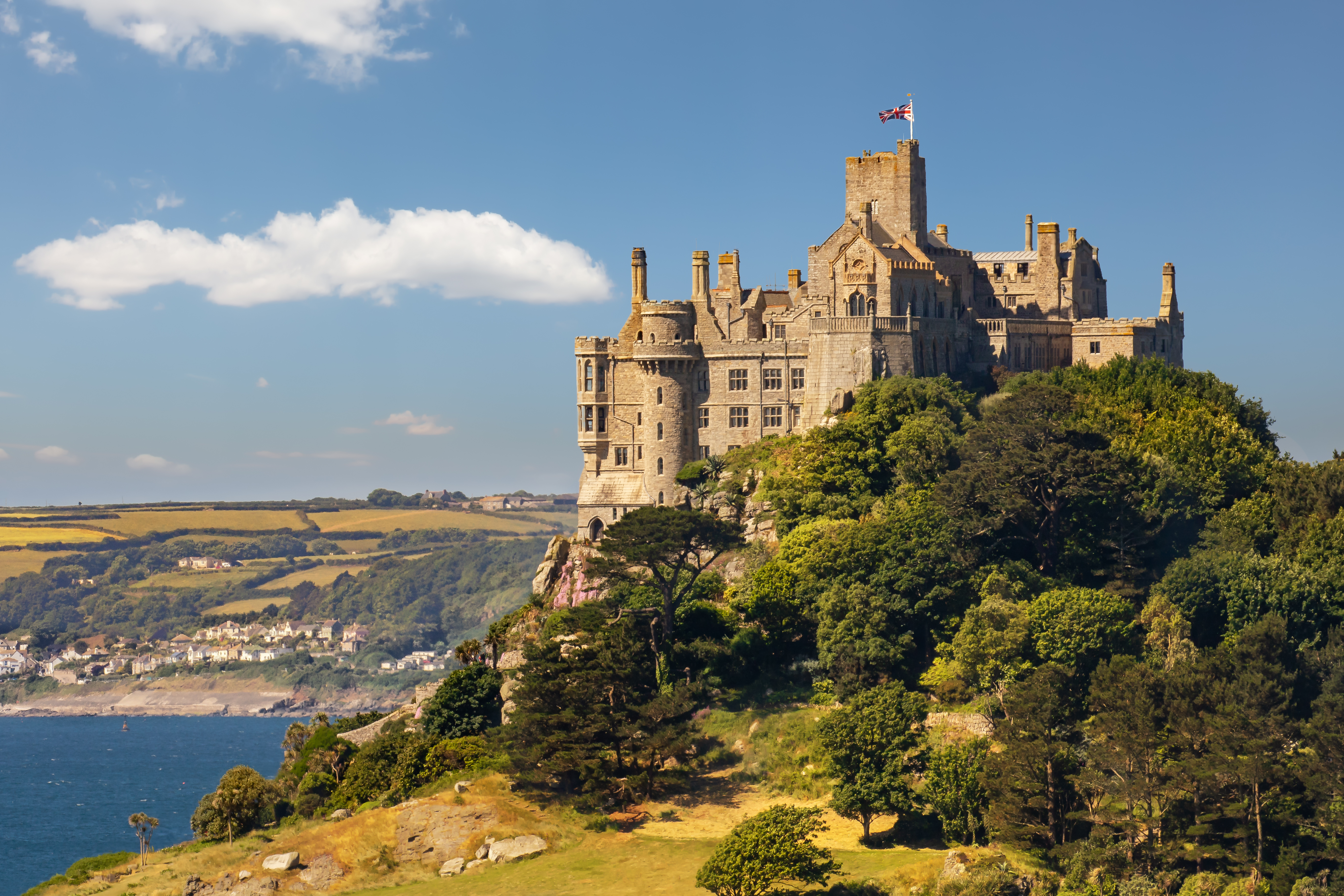
St. Michael's Mount

There have been two baronetcies created for members of the St Aubyn family, one in the Baronetage of England and one in the Baronetage of the United Kingdom.

The St Aubyn Baronetcy, of Clowance in the County of Cornwall, was created in the Baronetage of England on 11 December 1671 for John St Aubyn, who later represented St Michaels in the House of Commons. He was the son of Colonel John St Aubyn, who had acquired the island and castle St. Michael's Mount in 1659, having already become Governor of the Mount in 1647.

Sir John St Aubyn's lineage continued through four subsequent Baronets, all of whom were also named John St Aubyn. The second Baronet sat as Member of Parliament for Helston, the third Baronet for Cornwall, the fourth Baronet for Launceston and Cornwall and the fifth Baronet for Truro, Penryn and Helston. The title became extinct on the death of the fifth Baronet, in 1839.

While the title became extinct, the fifth Baronet's legacy continued when his illegitimate son, Edward St Aubyn, became the first Baronet of a new St Aubyn Baronetcy, of St Michael's Mount in the County of Cornwall, created in the Baronetage of the United Kingdom on 31 July 1866. His son, the second Baronet under this UK baronetage, was elevated to the peerage as a baron, becoming the first Baron St Levan in 1877. As of 2024 his descendants, the Lords St Levan, remain seated at St Michael's Mount.

The fifth Baronet's legacy also continued through his daughter and co-heir, the mother of Reverend Hender Molesworth, who in 1844 assumed by Royal licence the additional surname of St Aubyn and was the father of Sir St Aubyn Hender Molesworth-St Aubyn, 12th Baronet of the Molesworth-St Aubyn Baronets.

== St Aubyn baronets, of Clowance (1671) ==
Escutcheon of the St Aubyn baronets of Clowance

- Sir John St Aubyn, 1st Baronet (1645–1687)
- Sir John St Aubyn, 2nd Baronet (1670–1714)
- Sir John St Aubyn, 3rd Baronet (1696–1744)
- Sir John St Aubyn, 4th Baronet (1726–1772)
- Sir John St Aubyn, 5th Baronet (1758–1839)

== St Aubyn Baronets, of St Michael's Mount (1866) ==
Escutcheon of the St Aubyn Baronets of St Michael's Mount

- Sir Edward St Aubyn, 1st Baronet (1799–1872)
- Sir John St Aubyn, 2nd Baronet (elevated to the peerage as the 1st Baron St Levan, created in 1887)

== See also ==
- Molesworth-St Aubyn baronets
- Catherine St Aubyn
- Edward St Aubyn
