= Sir John St Aubyn, 3rd Baronet =

English Tory politician

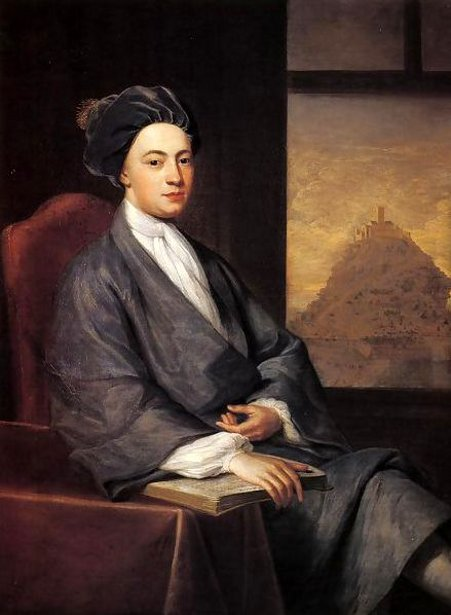
- portrait by John Smibert
- Born: 27 September 1696
- Died: 15 August 1744
- Education: Exeter College
- Occupation: Politician
- Spouse: Catharine Morice

Sir John St Aubyn, 3rd Baronet (1696–1744), of Clowance and St Michael's Mount, Cornwall, was an English Tory politician who sat in the House of Commons from 1722 to 1744.

== Early life ==
St Aubyn was born on 27 September 1696, the eldest son of Sir John St Aubyn, 2nd Baronet and his wife, Mary de la Hay, daughter and coheiress of Peter de la Hay of Westminster. He succeeded his father to the baronetcy on 20 June 1714. He was entered as gentleman-commoner at Exeter College, Oxford, on 10 June 1718, and created M.A. on 19 July 1721.

== Career ==
St Aubyn was returned unopposed as Member of Parliament for Cornwall at the 1722 British general election and was returned unopposed again in 1727, 1734 and 1741. In the House of Commons St Aubyn spoke infrequently. Joining the opposition against Robert Walpole, he was hostile to the Septennial Act, and the employment of Hanoverian troops with the standing army. On 9 March 1742, after Walpole's fall from power, he seconded Lord Limerick's motion for a committee to inquire into the transactions of the previous two decades, which was defeated by 244 votes to 242. A fortnight later he seconded a motion by Limerick for a secret committee of 21 to examine Walpole's official acts during the last ten years, and it was carried by 252 votes to 245. In the polling for the committee he led with 518 votes, but declined to preside. He is said to have also declined a seat on the Board of Admiralty.

St Aubyn was on close terms with William Borlase, and was a friend and correspondent of Alexander Pope. He was a member of the Tory Cocoa Tree Club. Jacobite sympathies were at one remove: he briefed Thomas Carte on parliamentary debates, for the benefit of the Old Pretender, who gained an exaggerated view of St Aubyn's effective support.

== Family and legacy ==
St Aubyn married Catherine Morice, daughter and coheiress of Sir Nicholas Morice, 2nd Baronet, at St James's Church, Piccadilly on 3 October 1725. The match brought him £10,000 in cash and the manor of Stoke-Damerel, including Devonport. She died at Clowance in Crowan on 16 June 1740, and was buried in Crowan church.

St Aubyn died of fever at Pencarrow, Egloshayle, Cornwall, on 15 August 1744, and was buried in a granite vault with his wife in Crowan church on 23 August. They had five children.

The prime minister said of Sir John: "I know the price of every member of the house except the little Cornish baronet".

Parliament of Great Britain
Preceded by Sir William Carew, Bt; John Trevanion	Member of Parliament for Cornwall; 1722–1744; With: Sir William Carew, Bt 1722-1744; Sir Coventry Carew, Bt 1744	Succeeded by Sir Coventry Carew, Bt; Sir John Molesworth, Bt
Baronetage of England
Preceded by John St Aubyn	Baronet (of Clowance); 1714–1744	Succeeded by John St Aubyn
