= Twickenham War Memorial =

War memorial in London

- United Kingdom
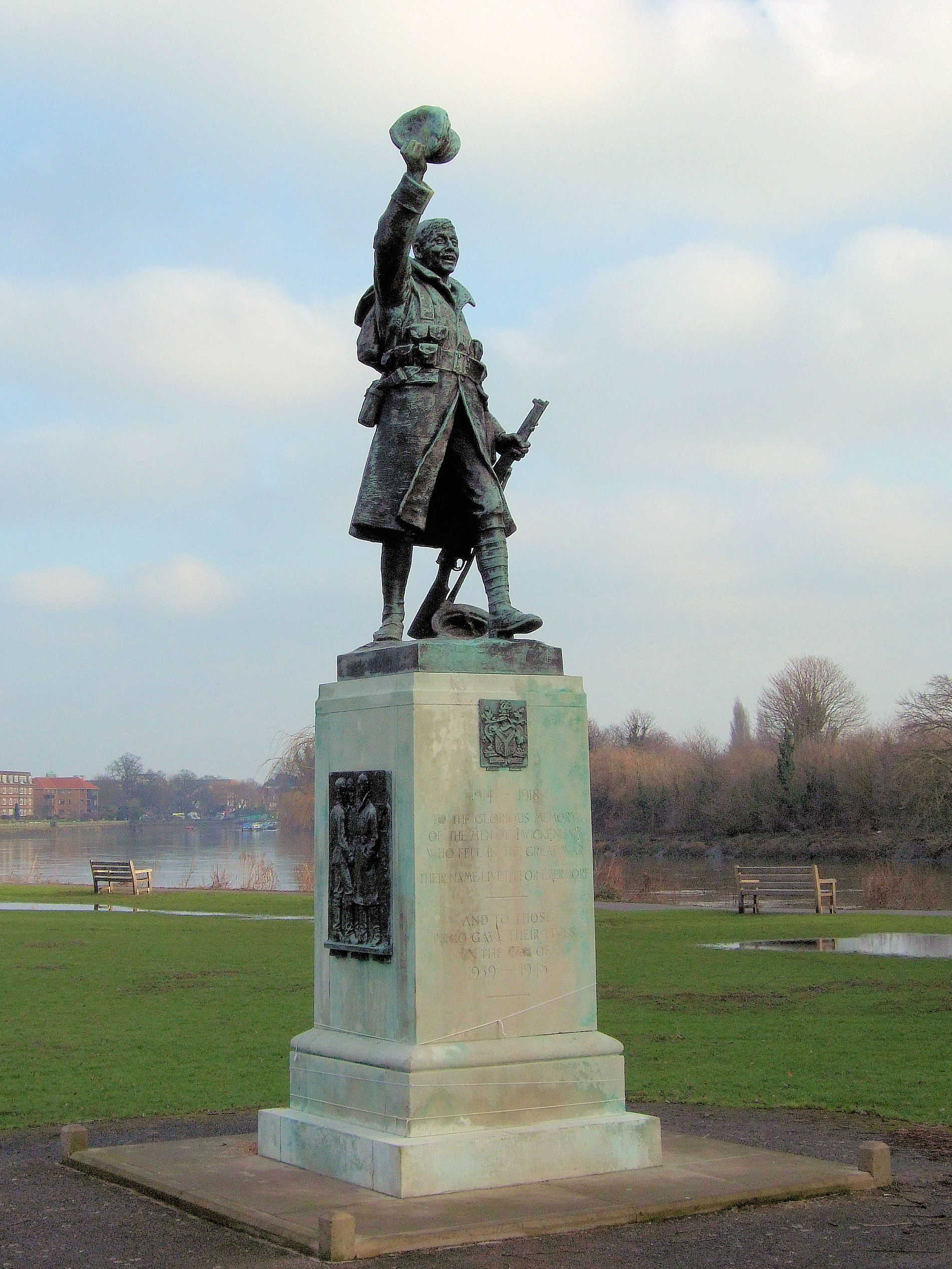
- For men from the district of Twickenham who died in the First and Second World Wars
- Unveiled: 1921; 105 years ago
- Location: 51.4402°N 0.3317°W; Twickenham, Richmond upon Thames, London
- Designed by: Mortimer Brown
- 1914–1918 TO THE GLORIOUS MEMORY OF THE MEN OF TWICKENHAM WHO FELL IN THE GREAT WAR THEIR NAME LIVETH EVERMORE AND TO THOSE WHO GAVE THEIR LIVES IN THE WAR OF 1939–1945

Listed Building – Grade II*
- Official name: Twickenham War Memorial
- Designated: 5 June 2017
- Reference no.: 1445040

Twickenham War Memorial, in Radnor Gardens, Twickenham, London, commemorates the men of the district of Twickenham who died in the First World War. After 1945, the memorial was updated to recognise casualties from the Second World War. The memorial was commissioned by Twickenham Urban District Council in 1921. It was designed by the sculptor Mortimer Brown, and is Brown's only significant public work. The memorial is unusual for its representation of a jubilant soldier returning home. It became a Grade II* listed structure in 2017.

== Site ==
The area around Richmond had been a favoured site for wealthy Londoners to construct country houses since medieval times. Cherry and Pevsner note that, after Westminster, "no other London borough has a greater wealth of major palaces and mansions than Richmond upon Thames". Edward III died at his palace at Sheen in 1377. Henry VII replaced that building with Richmond Palace, which was further developed by his son Henry VIII until the latter gained possession of the even grander Hampton Court Palace in 1525. In the 18th century the area saw the development of more modest riverside retreats for the aristocracy and the upper classes. Among the earliest, dating from 1724, was Marble Hill House, designed by Roger Morris for the Countess of Suffolk. Alexander Pope was a regular visitor to Marble Hill and built his own villa nearby. These villas were firstly constructed in a Palladian style, echoing the villas of the Veneto, but by the mid-century early examples of the Gothic Revival began to appear, most notably Horace Walpole's Strawberry Hill House. A lesser Gothic example was Radnor House, the grounds of which now form part of Radnor Gardens.

== History and description ==
The park in which the memorial stands was formed from the grounds of Radnor House and Cross Deep House by Twickenham Urban District Council in 1903. At the end of the First World War, in common with many local authorities, the council decided to erect a war memorial to commemorate the dead of the district. The sculptor Mortimer Brown won a design competition in 1920 and was commissioned to undertake the work. Brown had trained at the Hanley School of Art and the National Art Training School, followed by study at the Royal Academy Schools.

The memorial represents a life-size soldier, cast in bronze by the Singer & Sons foundry. The figure is depicted walking in service dress and greatcoat, holding a rifle in one hand, with the other hand lifting up a cap to wave above his head. The statue is unusual for showing a "joyful returning soldier, in contrast to the more conventional attitudes of watchfulness or mourning". The Cambridge War Memorial has a similar composition of a soldier marching home cheerfully holding a helmet, and the Lancashire Fusiliers Boer War Memorial in Bury, Greater Manchester, is an earlier example of a memorial sculpture of a soldier holding aloft his headgear in celebration. (Both are listed at Grade II.)

The main statue stands on a tall square plinth of Portland stone, which has bronze plaques set in four sides and a dedicatory inscription on the south side which was amended after the Second World War to recognise the dead of Twickenham in that conflict. Three of the bronze plaques are figurative relief sculptures showing: three airmen (to the west); two women, one a nurse and the other a Voluntary Aid Detachment volunteer (north); and two naval officers and a rating (east). The plaque commemorating the contribution of women to the war effort is "uncommon". The naval plaque was stolen in 2011 and the current plaque is a replacement installed in 2012. The borough's coat of arms appears on small bronze plaque on the south side of the plinth, above the inscription: 1914–1918 / TO THE GLORIOUS MEMORY / OF THE MEN OF TWICKENHAM / WHO FELL IN THE GREAT WAR / THEIR NAME LIVETH EVERMORE / AND TO THOSE / WHO GAVE THEIR LIVES / IN THE WAR OF / 1939–1945.

The memorial was sited to form a vista towards the Star and Garter Home for disabled servicemen, previously located on Richmond Hill to the north-east. It was unveiled by Field Marshal Sir William Robertson, 1st Baronet, on 2 November 1921, at a ceremony attended by a band from the Royal Military School of Music at Kneller Hall nearby and a large crowd sheltering under umbrellas against the continuous rain. The memorial was designated a Grade II* listed structure on 5 April 2017.

== See also ==
- Grade II* listed war memorials in England
- Grade II* listed buildings in the London Borough of Richmond upon Thames
- List of public art in the London Borough of Richmond upon Thames

== Sources ==
- Cherry, Bridget; Pevsner, Nikolaus (2002). London 2: South. The Buildings of England. New Haven & London: Yale University Press. ISBN 978-0300096514. OCLC 987268607.
- Clark, Kenneth (1962). The Gothic Revival: An Essay in the History of Taste. London: John Murray. ISBN 978-0719531026.
- Harris, John (1994). The Palladian Revival: Lord Burlington, His Villa and Garden at Chiswick (Exhibition catalog). Yale University Press. ISBN 0-300-05983-3.
- Ormrod, W. M. (1990). Edward III. Stroud, Gloucestershire: Tempus. ISBN 978-0752433202. OCLC 255899460.
- Tavenor, Robert (1991). Palladio and Palladianism. London: Thames & Hudson. ISBN 978-0500202425. OCLC 1001148314.
