= Henry Robartes, 3rd Earl of Radnor =

English landowner

- Earl of Radnor
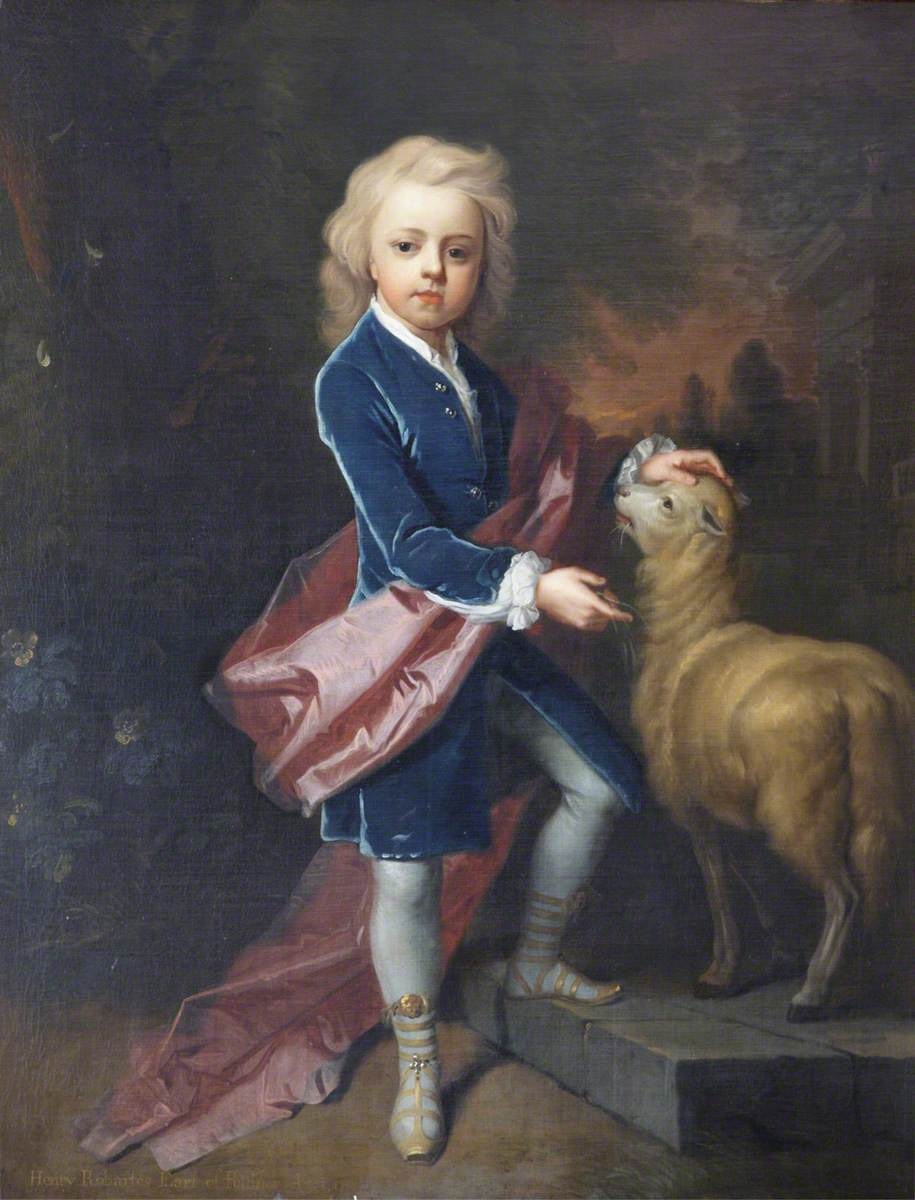
- Radnor as a boy, attributed to Michael Dahl
- Tenure: 1723–1741
- Predecessor: Charles Robartes, 2nd Earl of Radnor
- Other titles: 4th Baron Robartes
- Born: c. 1695
- Died: February 1741; Paris

Henry Robartes, 3rd Earl of Radnor (c. 1695 – February 1741) was an English landowner, Earl of Radnor in the peerage of Great Britain and a member of the House of Lords from 1723 until his death.

== Early life and family ==
Robartes was the first son of Russell Robartes (1671–1719), by his marriage to Lady Mary Booth, a daughter of Henry Booth, 1st Earl of Warrington. He had a brother and two sisters. His father was a younger son of Robert Robartes, Viscount Bodmin, the eldest son and heir of John Robartes, 1st Earl of Radnor.

In 1723 he succeeded his father’s older brother Charles Robartes, 2nd Earl of Radnor, in his peerages and estates.

He spent little time at Lanhydrock House, his country seat in Cornwall, and when it was visited by the antiquary John Loveday he found it in a sorry state.

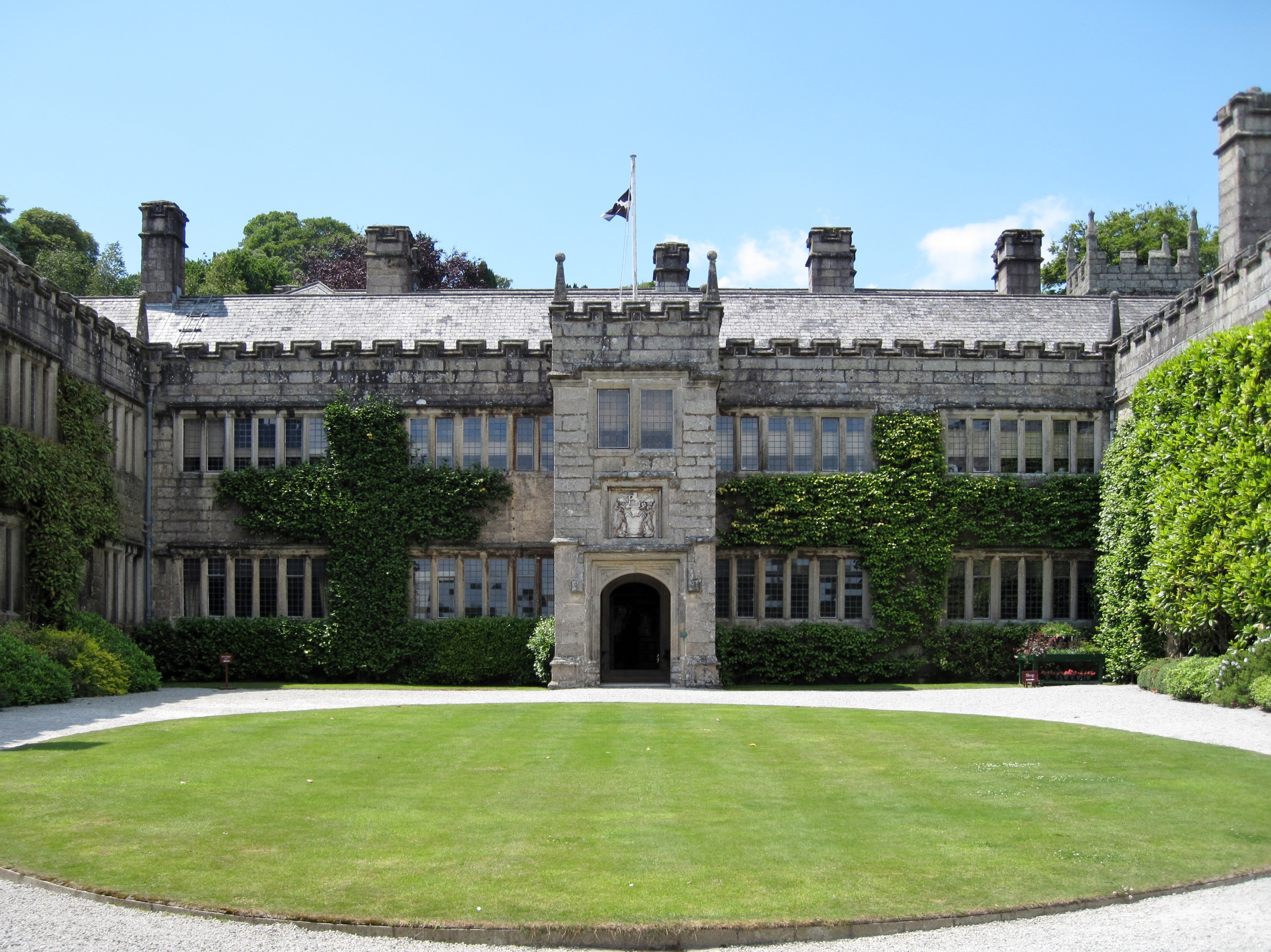
Lanhydrock

Dying unmarried in Paris in 1741, Radnor was succeeded in his peerages by an older unmarried cousin, John Robartes, but left his property to a nephew, George Hunt, the son of his sister Mary, whose heir was his niece Anna Maria Hunt. She married Charles Bagenal Agar, and their son Thomas Agar-Robartes inherited the Lanhydrock estate and was created the first Baron Robartes.

Peerage of England
Preceded by Charles Robartes	Earl of Radnor; 1723–1741	Succeeded by John Robartes
