= John Robartes, 4th Earl of Radnor =

John Robartes
- 4th Earl of Radnor
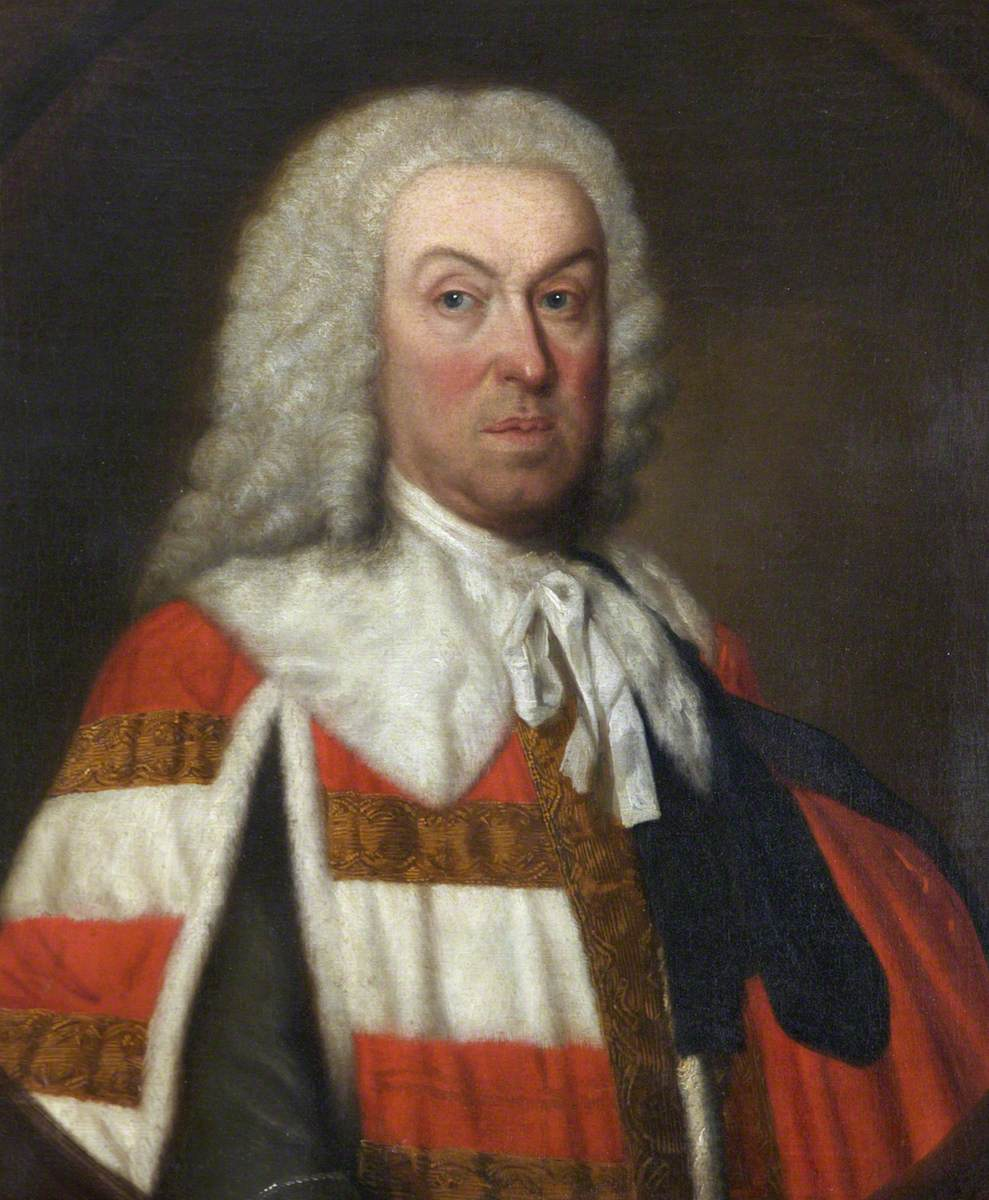
- Tenure: 1741–1757
- Predecessor: Henry Robartes, 3rd Earl of Radnor
- Other titles: 5th Baron Robartes
- Born: 1686; London
- Died: 15 July 1757 (aged 70–71); Twickenham
- Residence: Radnor House, Strawberry Hill, Twickenham
- Parents: Francis Robartes and Anne Fitzgerald

John Robartes (1686 – 15 July 1757) was the 4th Earl of Radnor and contemporary and neighbour of Alexander Pope and Horace Walpole.

== Early life and family ==
John Robartes was born in London in 1686. He was the son of Francis Robartes and his second wife Lady Anne, was the widow of Hugh Boscawen of Tregothnan, and daughter of Wentworth Fitzgerald, 17th Earl of Kildare. He was educated at Eton and Christ's College, Cambridge.

== Later life ==
He bought the lease of a house, later named Radnor House, thought to have been constructed around 1673, in Strawberry Hill near Twickenham and is recorded as having lived there from 1722 until his death. In 1741, on the death of his cousin Henry Robartes, 3rd Earl of Radnor, he inherited his peerages, but not the family estates in Cornwall. Robartes embellished his house in Gothic Revival style and adorned the gardens with statuary. His gazebo and summer house survive in Radnor Gardens today. Horace Walpole referred to the property as Mabland in a letter to Richard Bentley, a mocking reference to the ornate decoration of contemporary Marylebone Gardens. Some observers conjecture that Walpole was piqued by his neighbour's anticipation of his own architectural ambitions, as this pre-dated his embellishment of Strawberry Hill House.

Alexander Pope lived nearby to the north, their two respective properties perhaps separated by one or two small intervening houses. Robartes was a witness to Pope's will, whilst Pope countersigned a lease for Robartes, evidence that the two were on good terms during their 22 years as neighbours.

He was elected a Fellow of the Royal Society in 1732.

== Art collection ==
Inside the house, Robartes built a collection of artworks, including Canaletto's The Old Horse Guards from St James's Park now owned by the Andrew Lloyd Webber Foundation. The collection also included work by Meindert Hobbema and paintings by Samuel Scott. Robartes is credited as having commissioned Peter Tillemans' View of Richmond from Twickenham Park, c. 1720. Robartes himself was the subject of a portrait, c. 1741, attributed to the circle of Thomas Hudson, later to become another neighbour at Cross Deep.

== Death and legacy ==
Robartes died, a bachelor, on 15 July 1757, aged 71. With his death the titles of Earl of Radnor and Baron Robartes became extinct. He bequeathed the house and much of his art collection to his steward, Frederick Atherton Hindley, the Canaletto and Hobbema to James Harris and two Scott paintings to Richard Owen Cambridge.

Peerage of England
Preceded by Henry Robartes	Earl of Radnor; 1741–1757	Extinct
