= Russell Robartes =

English politician

Russell Robartes, FRS (1671–1719) was an English politician who sat in the English and British House of Commons from 1693 to 1713.

Robartes was the second son of Robert Robartes, Viscount Bodmin and his wife Sarah Bodvel, daughter of John Bodvel, and younger brother of Charles Robartes, 2nd Earl of Radnor. He was educated at a private school in London and entered St. John’s College, Cambridge in 1689.

After serving in Flanders as an army volunteer in the 1693 campaign, Robartes was elected Member of Parliament for Bodmin at a by-election later that year, sitting until 1702. From 1702 to 1708 he sat for Lostwithiel, returning to sit for Bodmin again from 1708 to 1713. In 1703 he was elected a Fellow of the Royal Society.

He was appointed Teller of the Exchequer in 1710, succeeding his relative Francis Robartes, but lost the post in 1714 when he went to live in Paris and failed to return in good time.

Robartes died in 1719 and was buried in Chelsea, London. He had married Lady Mary, the daughter of Henry Booth, 1st Earl of Warrington, with whom he had 2 sons and 2 daughters. Their eldest son, Henry, became the 3rd Earl of Radnor in 1723.

Parliament of England
Preceded by Sir John Cutler Bt; Nicholas Glynn	Member of Parliament for Bodmin; 1693–1702; With: Nicholas Glynn 1693-1695; John Hoblyn 1695-1702	Succeeded by John Grobham Howe; John Hoblyn
Preceded by Sir John Molesworth; George Booth	Member of Parliament for Lostwithiel; 1702–1707; With: Sir John Molesworth 1703-1705; Robert Molesworth 1705-1706; James Kendall 1706-1707	Succeeded by Parliament of Great Britain
Parliament of Great Britain
Preceded by Parliament of England	Member of Parliament for Lostwithiel; 1707–1708; With: James Kendall	Succeeded by James Kendall; Joseph Addison
Preceded by Francis Robartes; Thomas Herne	Member of Parliament for Bodmin; 1708–1713; With: John Trevanion 1708-1710; Francis Robartes 1710-1713	Succeeded by Francis Robartes; Thomas Sclater
Preceded by James Kendall; Joseph Addison	Member of Parliament for Lostwithiel; 1709; With: Francis Robartes	Succeeded by Francis Robartes; Horatio Walpole
