= Nicholas Glynn =

Nicholas Glynn (1633 – March 1697) was an English Tory politician.

== Biography ==
Glynn was eldest son of William Glynn of Glynn House and Alice, daughter of Sir Arthur Harris, 1st Baronet, of Stowford. He was educated at Exeter College, Oxford from 1652. Following the Stuart Restoration in 1660, Glynn was appointed a commissioner for the militia and assessment in Cornwall. In 1666 he was appointed a justice of the peace for the county and in 1674–5 he served as High Sheriff of Cornwall.

At the March 1679 English general election, Glynn was elected as a Member of Parliament for Bodmin; he held the seat until 1695. In 1686 he represented Foymore in the Cornish Stannary Parliament. During the Exclusion Crisis, Glynn did not vote on the Exclusion Bill and was likely a supporter of the court as he retained his local offices. After the Glorious Revolution of 1688, Glynn voted to agree with the House of Lords that the throne was not vacant following James II's departure from England. In 1690 he was recorded as a Tory supporter of Lord Carmarthen. In the 2nd Parliament of William III and Mary II, Glynn was frequently given leave of absence owing to ill-health and he did not stand for re-election at the 1695 English general election.

Parliament of England
Preceded by Hender Robartes; Sir John Carew, Bt	Member of Parliament for Bodmin; 1679–1695; With: Hender Robartes (1679–1689); Sir John Cutler, Bt (1689–1693); Russell Robartes (1693–1695)	Succeeded by Russell Robartes; John Hoblyn
Political offices
Preceded by Peter Kekewich	High Sheriff of Cornwall; 1674–1675	Succeeded by Samuel Cabell
