= Francis Robartes =

English politician

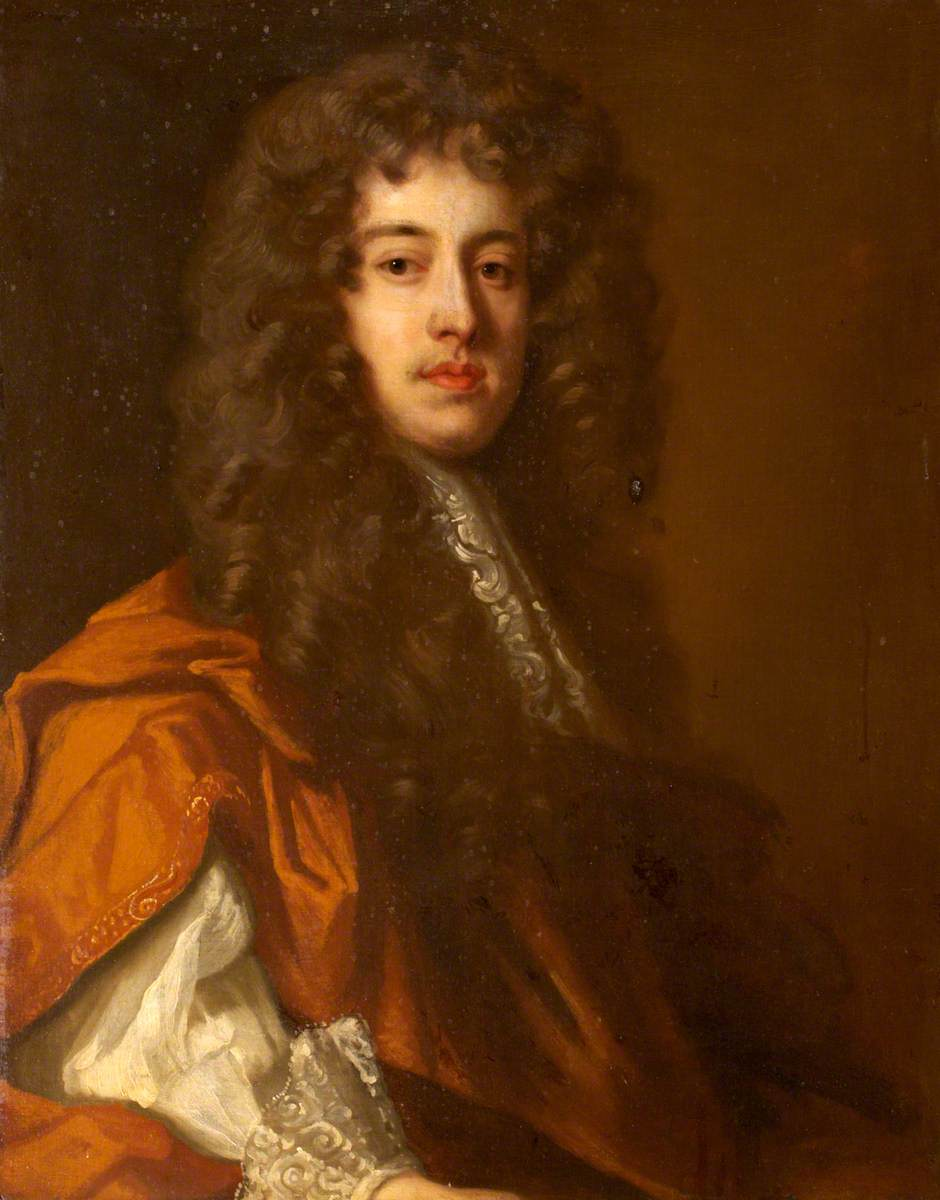
Francis Robartes

Francis Robartes FRS (c. 1649 – 3 February 1718) was an English politician who sat in the House of Commons at various times between 1673 and 1718.

== Early life ==
Robartes was the fourth son of John Robartes, 1st Earl of Radnor and his second wife Letitia Isabella Smythe (1630–1714). He was baptised at Lanhydrock in Cornwall on 6 January 1650. He was at school at Chelsea under Mr Cary and was admitted at Christ's College, Cambridge on 2 May 1663 aged 13. Robartes was known as a musical composer and a writer of the theory of sound. He became a Fellow of the Royal Society in 1673.

== Political career ==
In 1673, Robartes was elected Member of Parliament for Bossiney in the Cavalier Parliament and sat until 1679. He was elected MP for Cornwall in 1679 and sat until 1681. He was elected for Cornwall again in 1685 and sat until 1687. In 1689 he was elected MP for Lostwithiel and sat until 1690 when he was re-elected for Cornwall. He was elected MP for Tregony in 1695 and sat until 1702 when he was elected MP for Bodmin. He sat for Bodmin until 1708, for Lostwithiel again from 1709 to 1710 and for Bodmin from 1710 to 1718. He was a Teller of the Exchequer from 1704 to 1710.

== Later life ==
Robartes became a vice-president of the Royal Society. He was the brother of Robert Robartes and Hender Robartes. Robartes married firstly Penelope Pole, daughter of Sir Courtenay Pole, 2nd Baronet and Urith Shapcote, but had no issue. He married secondly Lady Anne Fitzgerald, daughter of Wentworth Fitzgerald, 17th Earl of Kildare and Lady Elizabeth Holles, and widow of Hugh Boscawen of Tregothnan, and their son, John, inherited the title of 4th Earl of Radnor.

Robartes died at Chelsea, London, aged 68.

== Ancestry ==
John Robartes
Richard Robartes, 1st Baron Robartes
Philip Gaverigan
John Robartes, 1st Earl of Radnor
John Hender of Botreaux Castle
Frances Hender
Francis Robartes
Sir Thomas Smythe
Sir John Smythe
Sarah Blount
Isabella Smythe
Robert Rich, 1st Earl of Warwick
Isabella Rich
Penelope Devereux, Lady Rich

Parliament of England
Preceded by Robert Robartes; Richard Rous	Member of Parliament for Bossiney; 1673–1679; With: Robert Robartes	Succeeded by John Tregagle; William Coryton
Preceded by Jonathan Trelawny; Sir John Coryton, Bt	Member of Parliament for Cornwall; 1679–1681; With: Sir Richard Edgcumbe	Succeeded by Lord Lansdown; Viscount Bodmin
Preceded by Lord Lansdown; Viscount Bodmin	Member of Parliament for Cornwall; 1685–1687; With: Lord Lansdown	Succeeded by Sir John Carew, Bt; Hugh Boscawen
Preceded by Sir Robert Southwell; Sir Matthias Vincent	Member of Parliament for Lostwithiel; 1689 –1690; With: Walter Kendall	Succeeded by Sir Bevil Granville; Walter Kendall
Preceded by Sir John Carew, Bt; Hugh Boscawen	Member of Parliament for Cornwall; 1690–1695; With: Hugh Boscawen	Succeeded by John Speccot; Hugh Boscawen
Preceded by The Earl of Kildare; Hugh Fortescue	Member of Parliament for Tregony; 1695–1702; With: James Montagu 1695-1698; Philip Meadowes 1698-1701; Hugh Fortescue 1701-1702	Succeeded by Hugh Boscawen; Joseph Sawle
Preceded by John Grobham Howe; John Hoblyn	Member of Parliament for Bodmin; 1702–1708; With: John Hoblyn 1702-1706; Thomas Herne 1706-1708	Succeeded by John Trevanion; Russell Robartes
Parliament of Great Britain
Preceded by James Kendall; Joseph Addison	Member of Parliament for Lostwithiel; 1709– 1710; With: Russell Robartes 1709; Horatio Walpole 1710	Succeeded by John Hill; Hugh Fortescue
Preceded by John Trevanion; Russell Robartes	Member of Parliament for Bodmin; 1710–1718; With: Russell Robartes 1710-1713; Thomas Sclater 1713-1715; John Legh 1715-1718	Succeeded by Charles Beauclerk; John Legh
