= Radnor House =

Former house in London

House
- Radnor
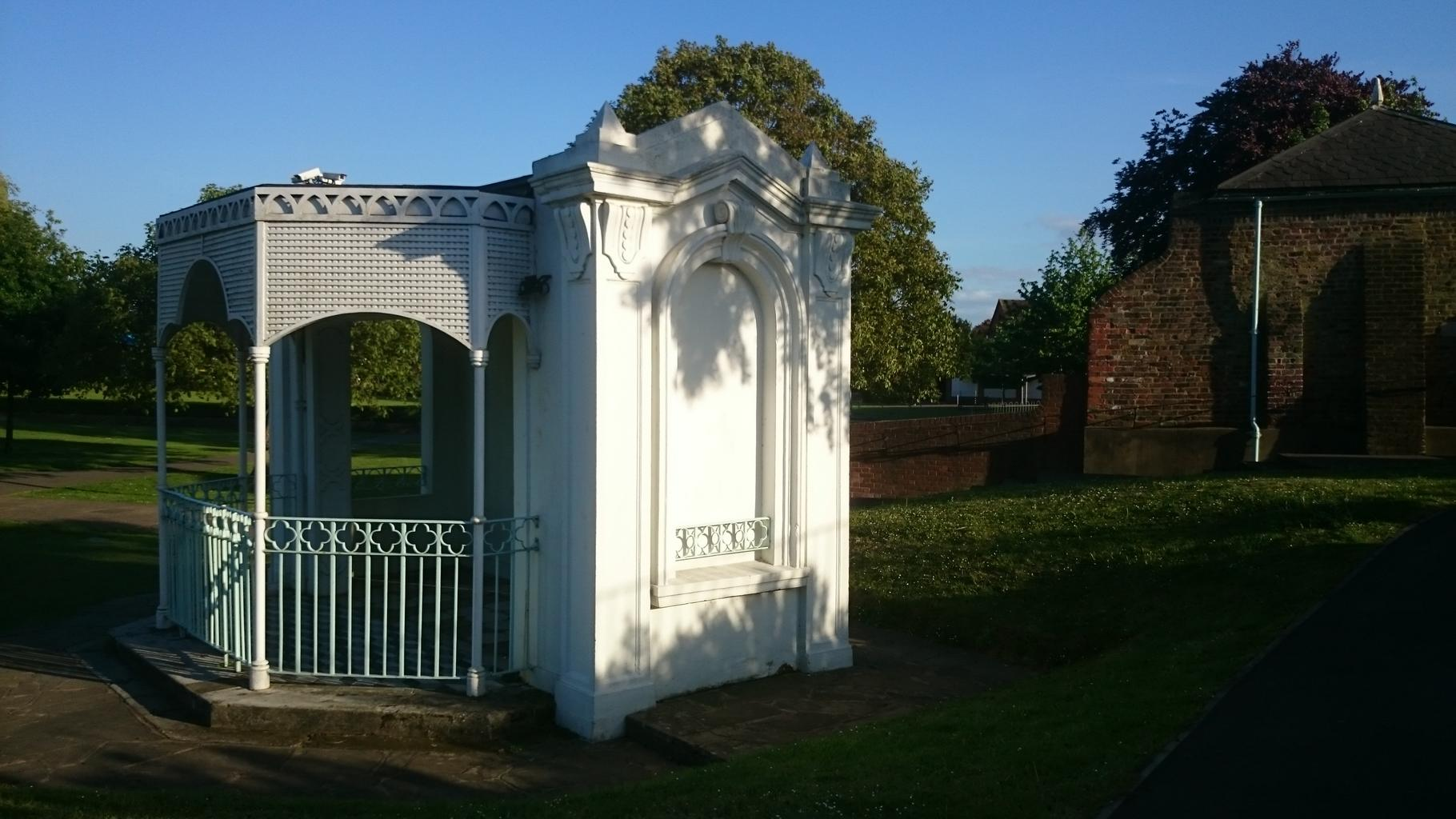

- Location within London Borough of Richmond upon Thames
- Etymology: Earl of Radnor

General information
- Status: Destroyed
- Architectural style: Gothic Revival, Italianate
- Location: Cross Deep, Strawberry Hill, Twickenham
- Coordinates: 51°26′26.2″N 0°19′55.3″W
- Completed: 1673
- Renovated: c. 1742, 1846
- Destroyed: 16 September 1940

Technical details
- Floor count: 4

Renovating team
- Architect: Henry Edward Kendall Jr.

Radnor House was an English 17th-century house on the banks of the River Thames in Cross Deep, Strawberry Hill, London, 0.5 miles (0.80 km) south of Twickenham town centre. It was destroyed by a bomb in 1940, and the remains of house and grounds form part of present-day Radnor Gardens.

== History ==
Radnor House, built 1673, was, in turn, named after John Robartes 4th Earl of Radnor who bought the lease of the house and lived there from 1722 until his death in 1757. Robartes acquired about 7 acres (2.8 ha) of land across the Cross Deep Road opposite the house, extending west to the line of present-day Radnor Road, and which he connected to the riverside property by a tunnel like his celebrated neighbour to the north, Alexander Pope. Robartes also purchased adjacent property to the north and extended and embellished the house in gothic style in about 1745. He also decorated the gardens with statuary, all of which incurred the slight mockery of his neighbour, Horace Walpole, who referred the property as Mabland in a letter to Richard Bentley, a reference to the ornate decoration of contemporary Marylebone Gardens. Some observers conjecture that Walpole was piqued by his neighbour's anticipation of his own architectural ambitions, as this pre-dated his gothic embellishment of Strawberry Hill House.

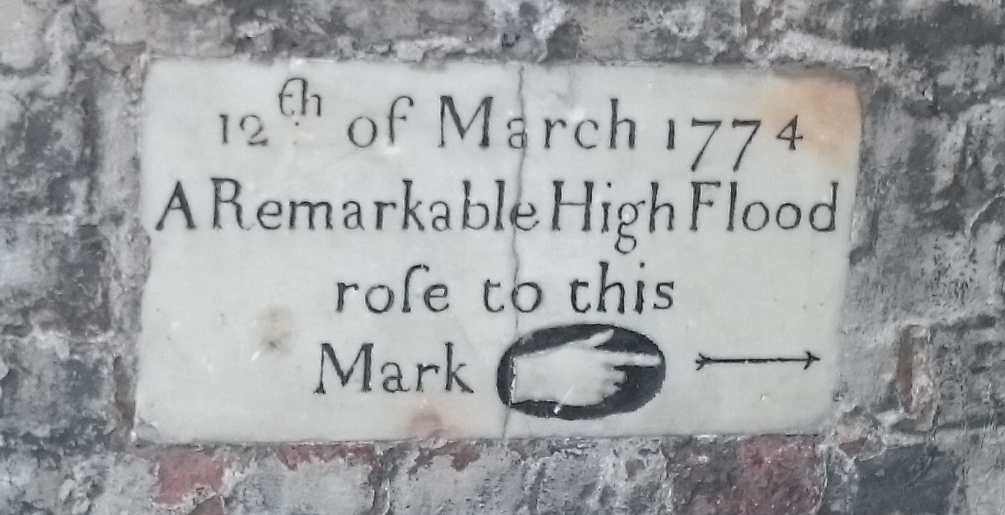
Radnor Gardens 1774 Flood marker in the wall of Radnor House

Radnor House's riverside gardens to the east included part of Cross Deep Ait, a former larger neighbour of adjacent Swan Island. The two aits are shown as single entity on John Rocque's map of 1746. A footbridge connected the island, metal remnants of which can still be perceived lining the central footpath in the gardens today. The picture View of the Earl of Radnor's House by Augustin Heckel, engraved by Anthony Walker in 1750 shows the house and garden from the river, with Cross Deep Ait in the foreground and Cross Deep House and riverside garden to the south. A notable flood that occurred on 12 March 1774 is commemorated by a stone plaque in the remaining wall of the house.

After Robartes' death, Radnor House was left to Robartes' steward, Frederick Atherton Hindley. Following his bankruptcy in 1779 and death in 1781 there followed a period of uncertainty about its ownership due to disputes over title resulting from Hindley's debts. In 1785 it was purchased by Sir Francis Basset who held it until 1793. Subsequent owners included Lady Marjory and Lady Anne Murray, John Ivatt Briscoe and, possibly for a short period, Francis Needham, 2nd Earl of Kilmorey before he bought and lived at the neighbouring Cross Deep House. Between 1846 and 1847, under the ownership of wine merchant, William Chillingworth, Radnor House was remodelled in an Italianate style by Henry Edward Kendall Jr.

By the end of the 19th century, Radnor House was becoming dilapidated. Purchased in 1902 by Twickenham Urban District along with the adjacent properties, in 1903 the gardens were opened to the public and remain today as Radnor Gardens. The house stood empty for some time before serving briefly as a school clinic. The council's hesitant deliberations regarding its renovation were cut short on 16 September 1940 at 10:30pm when a 250kg delayed action high explosive bomb fell through the house. Only a few walls remain, indicated by commemorative stones, as do the Grade II listed gazebo and summer house.
