= Cross Deep House =

Demolished Twickenham house

- Location within London Borough of Richmond upon Thames
- Etymology: Cross Deep stream

General information
- Status: Demolished
- Location: Cross Deep, Strawberry Hill, Twickenham, England
- Coordinates: 51°26′26.2″N 0°19′55.3″W
- Completed: 1724
- Demolished: 1906

Technical details
- Floor count: 3

Cross Deep House was an 18th-century house, on the banks of the River Thames in Cross Deep, Strawberry Hill, 0.5 miles (0.80 km) south of Twickenham town centre. It was demolished in 1906 and the remains of its grounds form part of present-day Radnor Gardens.

== Etymology ==
The name reflects the name of a small stream that flowed into the Thames nearby.

== History ==
Cross Deep House was built in 1724 by Twickenham carpenter, Robert Parsons. It was sited between Radnor House to the north and what subsequently became Strawberry Hill House to the south. The house itself was located on the opposite side of the Cross Deep road from its riverside garden.

It was bought by George Jones, solicitor, in 1745 and sold to slave trader, Robert Cramond, in 1752. The following year it was inherited by Eleanor Land and James Newton, and acquired by Isaac Fernandez Nunez in 1756. William Cole, on a visit to Walpole, noted:

From the garden you discover the elegant Chinese Temple, being the last building on the bank of the Thames, and close to my Lord Radnor’s house or garden wall – though the house belonging to it is on the other side of the road, and is the last house on that side next to Strawberry Hill, and is an handsome new square building – I say, from this garden of Mr Walpole you discover the Chinese summer house in which, about last August, Mr Isaac Fernandez Nunez, a Jew, shot himself through the head, on the loss of the Hermione, a rich French ship which he had insured, and by that means ruined his fortune and family. His house and furniture were sold by auction while I was at Strawberry Hill, and I was at the sale for a few minutes.

The Chinese Temple Cole refers to may have been a larger garden structure that existed at the time, rather than the Gothic Revival summerhouse that remains a feature within Radnor Gardens to this day. Although Cole refers to the lost ship as being French, it was the Spanish frigate Hermione captured in the action of 31 May 1762.

In 1764 Stafford Briscoe (1713–1789), a goldsmith and jeweller based in Cheapside, acquired the property. In 1775 he sold some land to his neighbour, Horace Walpole, in the latter phases of Walpole's development of the Strawberry Hill estate. Cross Deep House passed to James & Thomas Land by inheritance and at some point thereafter to William Land. It was next acquired by John Briscoe in 1789 by inheritance from his uncle and, on his death in 1809, passed to his son, John Ivatt Briscoe. In 1831 Briscoe purchased the neighbouring Radnor House, selling it in 1840 to Francis Needham, 2nd Earl of Kilmorey. He subsequently sold Cross Deep House to Lord Kilmorey in 1843 and Kilmorey made it his home for a while before moving downstream to Orleans House in 1846. In 1853 Frederick G Watkins bought Cross Deep House, followed by Edward Chapman in 1855. Sometime thereafter Charles James Freake acquired the house, over a decade before his more substantial development of Fullwell Park nearby. The house changed hands again in 1858, sold to Frederick G Watkins and sold again in 1860 to Edward Jas Coleman Esq and Charles Clark & Son, surgeons.

In 1871, William Vernon Harcourt MP owned the house for a year before sale to Richard Laming in 1872. It was then owned by three successive members of the Quick family until the house's eventual demolition in 1906 following acquisition of the gardens by Twickenham Urban District in 1903 and the creation of the riverside public open space of Radnor Gardens, now owned by Richmond upon Thames London Borough Council.

== Garden ==
Ordnance Survey maps show that during the late 1800s, the riverside garden of Cross Deep House also shared access to a former island, Cross Deep Ait, via a footbridge. Like its neighbour Radnor House, the metal remnants of the bridge are visible lining the southern footpath near the present-day bowling green in Radnor Gardens.
