= Strawberry Hill railway station =

National Rail station in London, England

Strawberry Hill
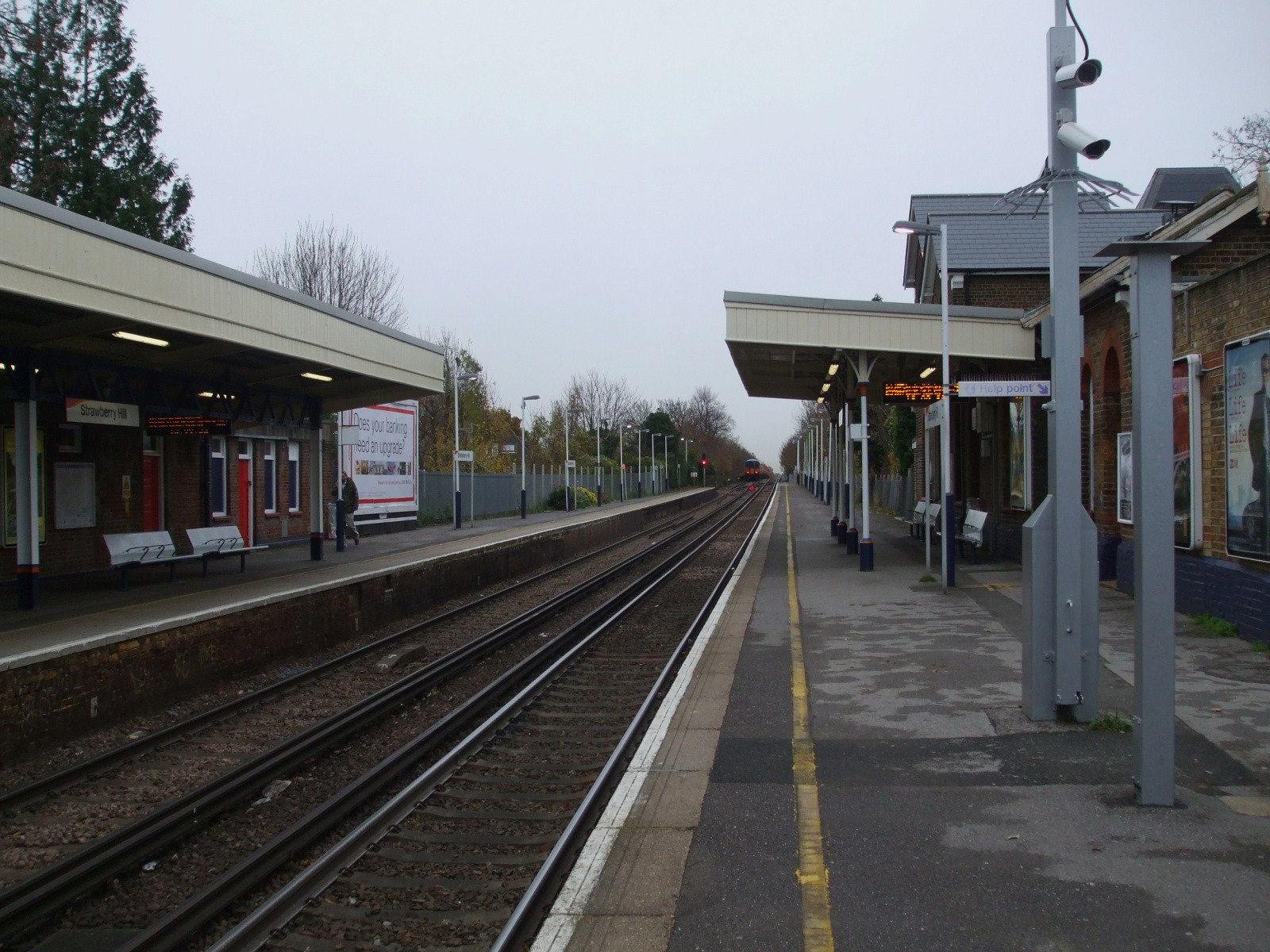
- Interactive map of Strawberry Hill

General information
- Location: Strawberry Hill
- Local authority: London Borough of Richmond upon Thames
- Managed by: South Western Railway
- Station code: STW
- DfT category: C2
- Number of platforms: 2
- Accessible: Yes
- Fare zone: 5

National Rail annual entry and exit
- 2020–21: ▼0.164 million
- Interchange: ▼23
- 2021–22: ▲0.454 million
- Interchange: ▲55
- 2022–23: ▲0.551 million
- Interchange: ▲368
- 2023–24: ▲0.628 million
- Interchange: ▲457
- 2024–25: ▲0.688 million
- Interchange: ▲518

Key dates
- 1 December 1873: Opened

Other information
- External links: Departures; Facilities
- Coordinates: 51.4389°N 0.3388°W

Strawberry Hill railway station is in Strawberry Hill in the London Borough of Richmond upon Thames, and is in London fare zone 5. It is 12 miles 22 chains (19.8 km) down the line from London Waterloo. The station, and all trains serving it, are operated by South Western Railway. The station is equipped with Oyster card swipe terminals.

The line through Strawberry Hill (the Kingston Loop) opened in 1863, but Strawberry Hill station did not open until 1 December 1873. The current booking office building on the up, or western, side and the platform canopies date from the 1935 modernisation. Lifting barriers replaced the level crossing swing gates in 1973, the signal box was demolished in 1975.

Strawberry Hill train maintenance depot, built in 1897, is inside the triangular junction of the Shepperton Branch Line with the Kingston Loop Line.

== Services ==
All services at Strawberry Hill are operated by South Western Railway.

The typical off-peak service in trains per hour is:

- 2 tph to London Waterloo via Richmond
- 2 tph to Teddington, returning to London Waterloo via Kingston and Wimbledon

During the peak hours, the station is served by four morning services from Shepperton to London Waterloo and two evening services from London Waterloo to Shepperton.

On Sundays, the service is reduced to hourly in each direction.

Preceding station	National Rail	Following station
Twickenham	South Western Railway Kingston Loop Line	Teddington
Twickenham	South Western Railway: Shepperton Branch Line; Peak Hours Only	Fulwell
