= Charles Robartes, 2nd Earl of Radnor =

English politician (1660–1723)

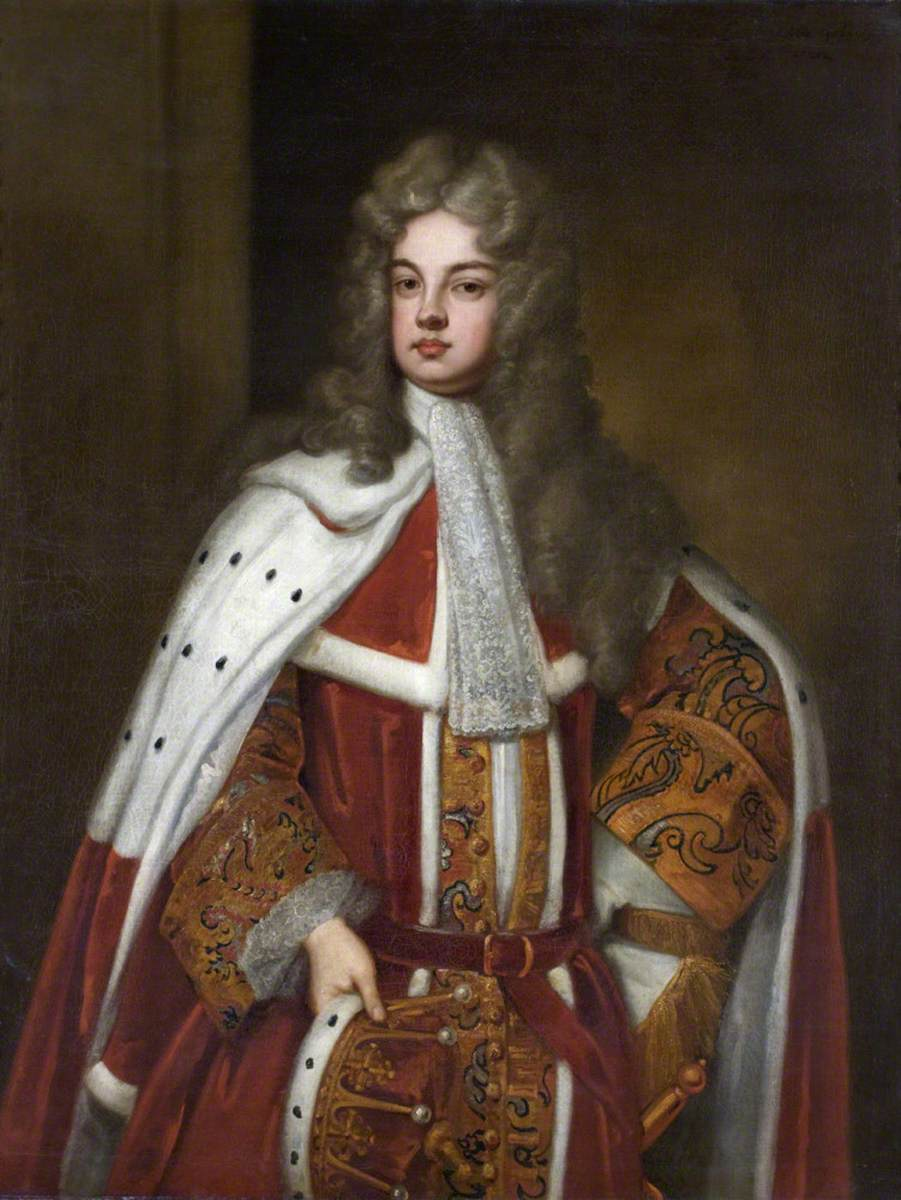
Charles Bodvile Robartes, 2nd Earl of Radnor

Charles Bodvile Robartes, 2nd Earl of Radnor PC FRS (1660–1723) was an English politician who sat in the House of Commons from 1679 until 1681 and again in 1685 until he inherited a peerage as Earl of Radnor. He was styled Viscount Bodmin from 1682 to 1685.

== Family ==
Robartes was the son of Robert Robartes, Viscount Bodmin, eldest son of John Robartes, 1st Earl of Radnor and his wife Sarah Bodvel, second daughter of John Bodvel of Bodvile Castle, Cornwall and Ann Russell. His father was ambassador to Denmark in 1681, and his mother was a noted beauty. She should have been a considerable heiress, but on her father's death a new will was found in favour of a distant cousin, Thomas Wynn, son of Sir Richard Wynn, 2nd Baronet, which involved the Robartes family in years of litigation.

In 1679, Robartes was elected Member of Parliament for Bossiney and held the seat until 1681. On the death of his father in 1682, he inherited the courtesy title Viscount Bodmin. He was elected MP for Cornwall in 1685 but later in the year he inherited the title of Baron Robartes and the earldom on the death of his grandfather John Robartes, 1st Earl of Radnor.

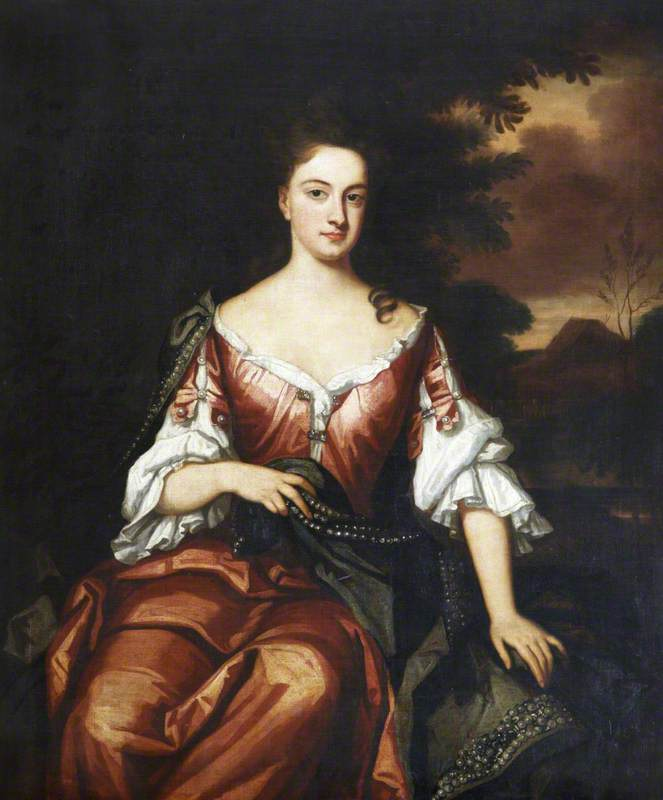
Charles Robartes married Elizabeth Cutler in 1689

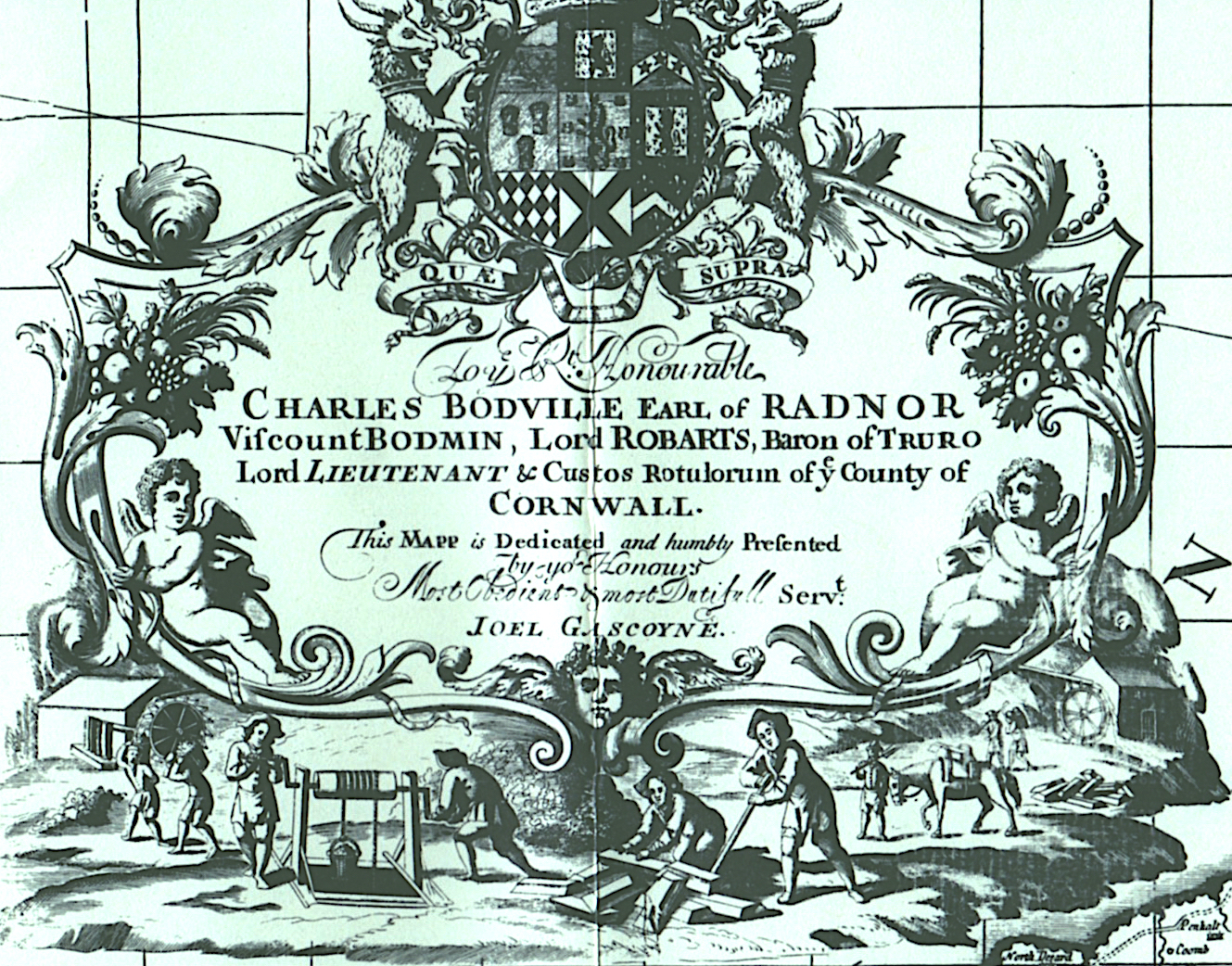
The dedication of Joel Gascoyne's map of Cornwall, 1699

In 1689, Radnor married Elizabeth, daughter of Sir John Cutler, 1st Baronet by his second wife Elicis Tipping who brought with her major estates including Harewood and Wimpole Hall. The marriage, a love match not endorsed by her father, is reported by all accounts to have been particularly happy but there were no children. By the terms of the marriage settlement on her death without an heir, 13 January 1697, these estates reverted to the ownership of her father's heirs, her cousins, the Boulter family.

He was at various times a Privy Counsellor, the Lord Warden of the Stannaries, Lord Lieutenant of Cornwall and Custos Rotulorum of Cornwall and Treasurer of the Chamber.

He was succeeded by his nephew Henry Robartes 3rd Earl of Radnor who died unmarried in Paris in 1741. The title became extinct on the death of the fourth earl, John Robartes (1686–1757), oldest son of Francis Robartes a son of the first Earl's second marriage to Letitia Isabella Smith.

== Notes ==
Parliament of England
| Preceded by William Coryton; John Tregagle | Member of Parliament for Bossiney; 1679–1681; With: Narcissus Luttrell 1679–1681; Sir Peter Colleton 1681–1685 | Succeeded by John Cotton; John Mounsteven |
| Preceded by Francis Robartes; Sir Richard Edgcumbe | Member of Parliament for Cornwall; 1685; With: Lord Lansdown | Succeeded by Lord Lansdown; Francis Robartes |
Political offices
| Preceded by The Earl of Bath | Lord Warden of the Stannaries; 1701–1702 | Succeeded by The Lord Granville |
| Preceded by The Lord De La Warr | Treasurer of the Chamber; 1714–1720 | Succeeded by Henry Pelham |
Honorary titles
| Preceded by The Earl of Bath | Lord Lieutenant of Cornwall; 1696–1702 | Succeeded by The Lord Granville |
| Preceded by The Earl of Bath | Custos Rotulorum of Cornwall; 1696–1702 | Succeeded by The Lord Granville |
| Preceded by The Earl of Rochester | Lord Lieutenant and Custos Rotulorum of Cornwall; 1714–1723 | Vacant Title next held by Richard Edgcumbe |
Peerage of England
| Preceded by John Robartes | Earl of Radnor; 1685–1723 | Succeeded by Henry Robartes |
