= John Robartes, 1st Earl of Radnor =

English politician (1606–1685)

The Right Honourable The Earl of Radnor PC
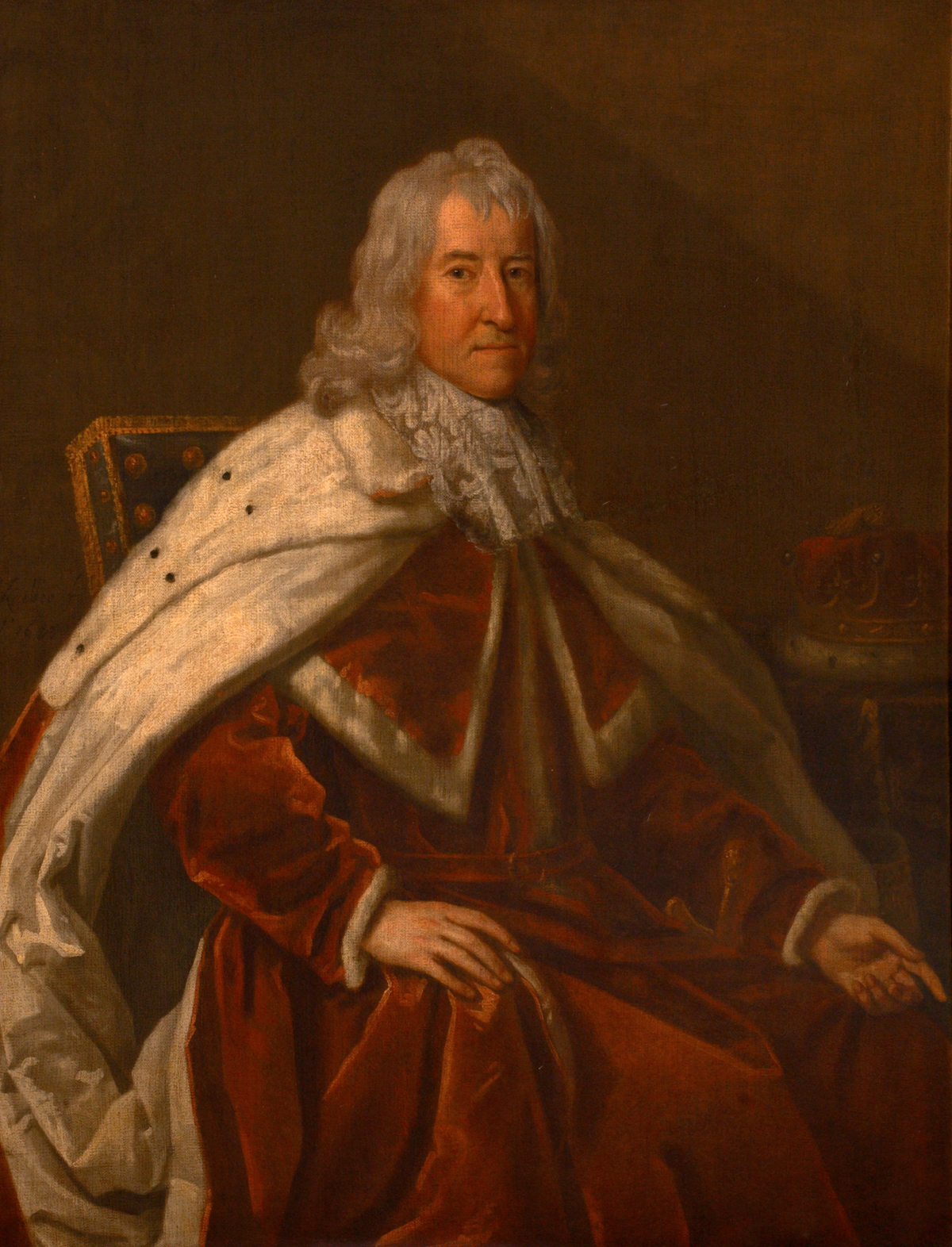
- Portrait by Godfrey Kneller

Lord President of the Council
- In office 24 October 1679 – 24 August 1684
- Preceded by: Anthony Ashley-Cooper, Earl of Shaftesbury
- Succeeded by: Laurence Hyde, Earl of Rochester

Lord Privy Seal
- In office 15 May 1661 – 1673
- Preceded by: Vacant (last held by Henry Bourchier, Earl of Bath)
- Succeeded by: Arthur Annesley, Earl of Anglesey

Personal details
- Children: 12, including Robert, Hender, and Francis

John Robartes, 1st Earl of Radnor PC (1606 – 17 July 1685) was an English politician, peer and military officer who fought for the Parliamentary cause during the English Civil War. He retired from public life before the trial and execution of Charles I (1649) and did not take an active part in politics until after the Restoration in 1660. During the reign of Charles II he opposed the Cavalier party (because he wished for more tolerance of non-Anglican religious sects). Toward the end of his life he opposed the more extreme Protestant groups, led by Anthony Ashley Cooper, 1st Earl of Shaftesbury, who refused to accept the succession of James because he was a self-declared Catholic.

== Early life ==
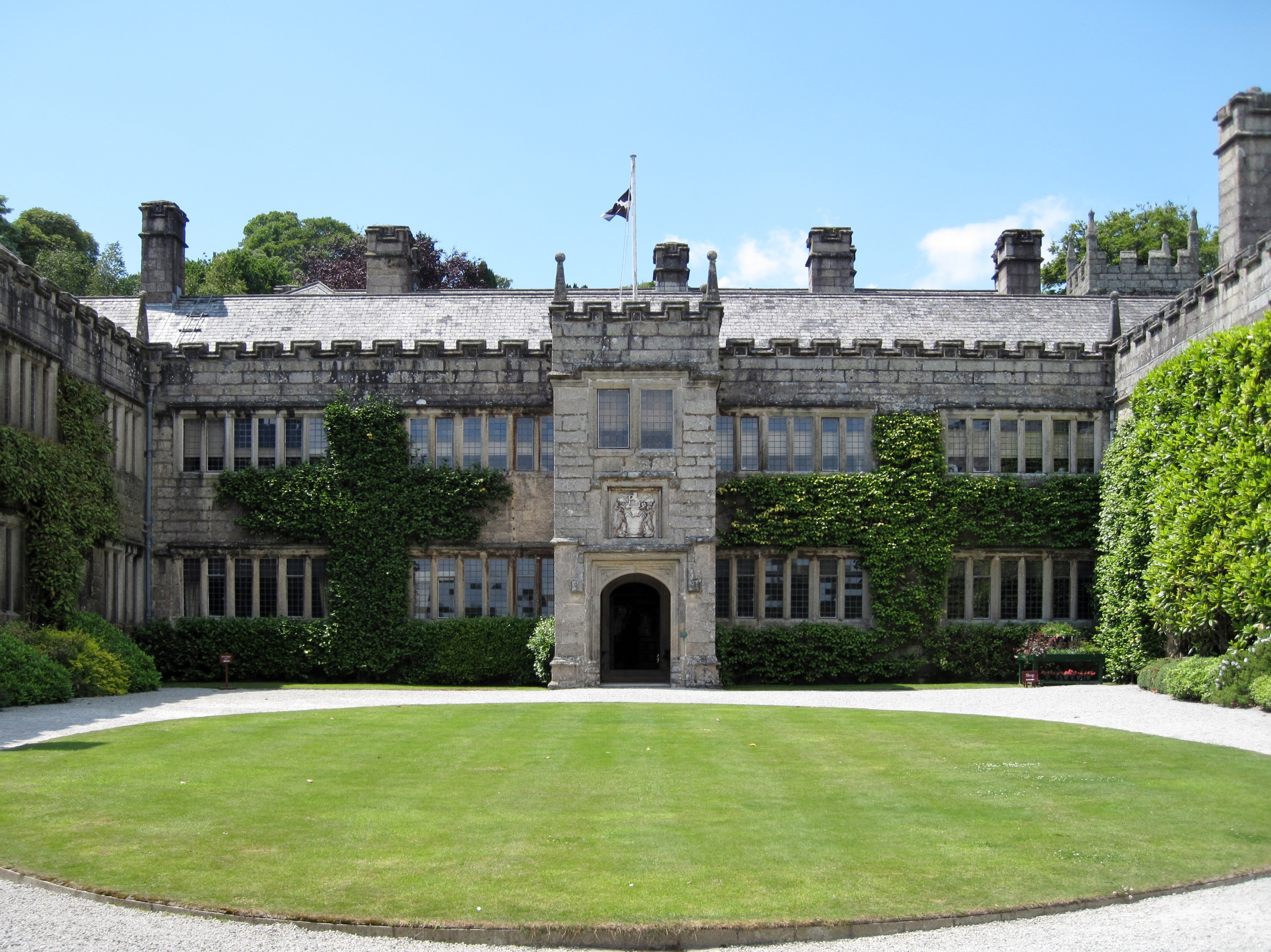
Lanhydrock House

John Robartes was born in Truro, where his father Richard Robartes was knighted in 1616, created a baronet in 1621 and raised to the peerage as Baron Robartes of Truro in 1625. The family had amassed wealth by trading in tin, wood and gorse (furze) used by the tin smelters, and in 1620 bought and began extending Lanhydrock House near Bodmin as the family seat. Richard became a baronet, and the baronet's hand on the shields engraved on the principal door of Lanhydrock House bear testimony to this. The barony was purchased for £10,000 in 1625. This ennoblement was claimed, by the opponents of the Duke of Buckingham, to have been purchased under compulsion.

His son, John, was the first of the family to receive a university education, being educated at Exeter College, Oxford. His father became the friend of Robert Rich, 2nd Earl of Warwick, and succeeded in arranging the marriage of his son to the Earl's younger daughter Lucy, thereby cementing an alliance that would bring John into contact with influential radical preachers of the time. Convinced of the more Calvinist doctrines of the Church of England, John became alarmed at the Arminian slant of King Charles I's religious policy and his increasingly autocratic rule; he believed the King had been misled by evil councillors. For this reason John Robartes fought on the side of the Parliament and, according to his view of things, also the King, during the Civil War. He fought with valour at the Battle of Edgehill on 23 October 1642, and at the First Battle of Newbury, on 20 September 1643.

He became a member of the Committee of Both Kingdoms. This Committee, on which his mentors, the Earls of Warwick and Essex, also sat, allowed him to appreciate Scottish Presbyterianism. He always relied on his own interpretation of the Bible; annotations he made in his books show that he sympathised with those who put faith above ritual. He had succeeded his father, Richard Robartes, as Baron Robartes in May 1634.

He is said by some, especially William Sanderson, to have persuaded the Earl of Essex to make his ill-fated march into Cornwall in 1644; he escaped with the earl from Fowey after the defeat of the parliamentary army in the first days of September 1644. Having reached Plymouth safely, he became its Governor and defended the city from the besieging Royalists. With the Self-Denying Ordinance of April 1645 he lost his command in Plymouth and was obliged like his brother-in-law, the Earl of Manchester, to watch the successes of Cromwell's New Model Army from the sidelines. He, like other Lords who had sided with Parliament, was marginalised by the so-called Independents who saw no future in continuing negotiations with King Charles. The execution of the King would have appalled him.

== Later life and death ==
Between the execution of Charles I and the restoration of Charles II in 1660, he retired to Lanhydrock with his family and took practically no part in public life. From Lanhydrock he exercised influence in Cornwall, though he seems to have dedicated most of his time to study and to his growing family. After 1660 he became a prominent public man, with influence among the Presbyterians, and ranged himself among Lord Clarendon's enemies. Robartes was regularly attacked (not least by Samuel Pepys) for incompetence, dilatoriness, arrogance and bad temper. He was offered the post of Lord Deputy of Ireland in 1660 but was unwilling to serve, and was Lord Lieutenant in 1669–1670; from 1661 to 1673 he was Lord Privy Seal although he did not exercise his office after his return from Ireland. He once again retired to Lanhydrock where he spent much time hunting deer and hare in his parks. He was elected a Fellow of the Royal Society in 1666.

In 1679 Charles II recalled him to public office to counteract the growing power of the Whigs, at that time a faction opposed to the succession of Charles' brother, the Catholic James, Duke of York. In 1679, for his support of Charles's policy of making his brother his successor, John was made Lord President of the Council and was created Viscount Bodmin and Earl of Radnor in the Peerage of England. He was president until 1684 and continued to attend the House of Lords until a few weeks before his death at Chelsea on 17 July 1685.

He was buried in the family crypt in Lanhydrock Church with little ceremony, as he had stipulated in his will.

== Family ==
Robartes was married twice: first to Lucy Rich, the second daughter of Robert Rich, 2nd Earl of Warwick, and Frances Hatton, with whom he had three sons, including Robert and Hender; and secondly to Letitia Isabella (died 1714), daughter of Sir John Smith of Bidborough, Kent, with whom he had nine other children, including Francis, and Araminta, who married Ezekiel Hopkins, Bishop of Derry. This lady has been identified with the "Lady Robarts" mentioned in Count Hamilton's Mémoires du Comte de Grammont, par le C. Antoine Hamilton. Edition ornée de LXXII portraits, Graves d'apres les tableaux originaux., A Londres, [1793] (she is described by Pepys as "a great beauty indeed".)

John Robartes' eldest son, Robert, Viscount Bodmin, was ambassador to Denmark in 1681, and died there in February 1682. He had married Sarah Bodvel, second daughter of John Bodvel of Bodvile Castle, North Wales, a marriage that displeased her father, whose consent had not been obtained, and led him to disinherit her in favour of a distant cousin. The title of Radnor later descended to Robert's son Charles (1660–1723), who is mentioned by Jonathan Swift in his Journal to Stella, and who managed to regain the Bodvel inheritance. The title became extinct on the death of the fourth earl, John Robartes (1686–1757), eldest son of Francis Robartes.

Honorary titles
| Preceded by The Earl of Pembroke | Custos Rotulorum of Cornwall; 1642–1685; With: The Earl of Bath 1642–1654 | Succeeded by The Earl of Bath |
Political offices
| Preceded by The Earl of Bath | Lord Privy Seal; 1661–1673 | Succeeded by The Earl of Anglesey |
| Preceded by Earl of Ossory as Lord Deputy | Lord Lieutenant of Ireland; 1669–1670 | Succeeded by The Lord Berkeley of Stratton |
| Preceded by The Earl of Shaftesbury | Lord President of the Council; 1679–1684 | Succeeded by The Earl of Rochester |
Peerage of England
| New creation | Earl of Radnor; 1679–1685 | Succeeded by Charles Bodville Robartes |
| Preceded by Richard Robartes | Baron Robartes; 1634–1685 | Succeeded by Charles Bodville Robartes |
