= Radnor Gardens =

Park in Strawberry Hill, London, England

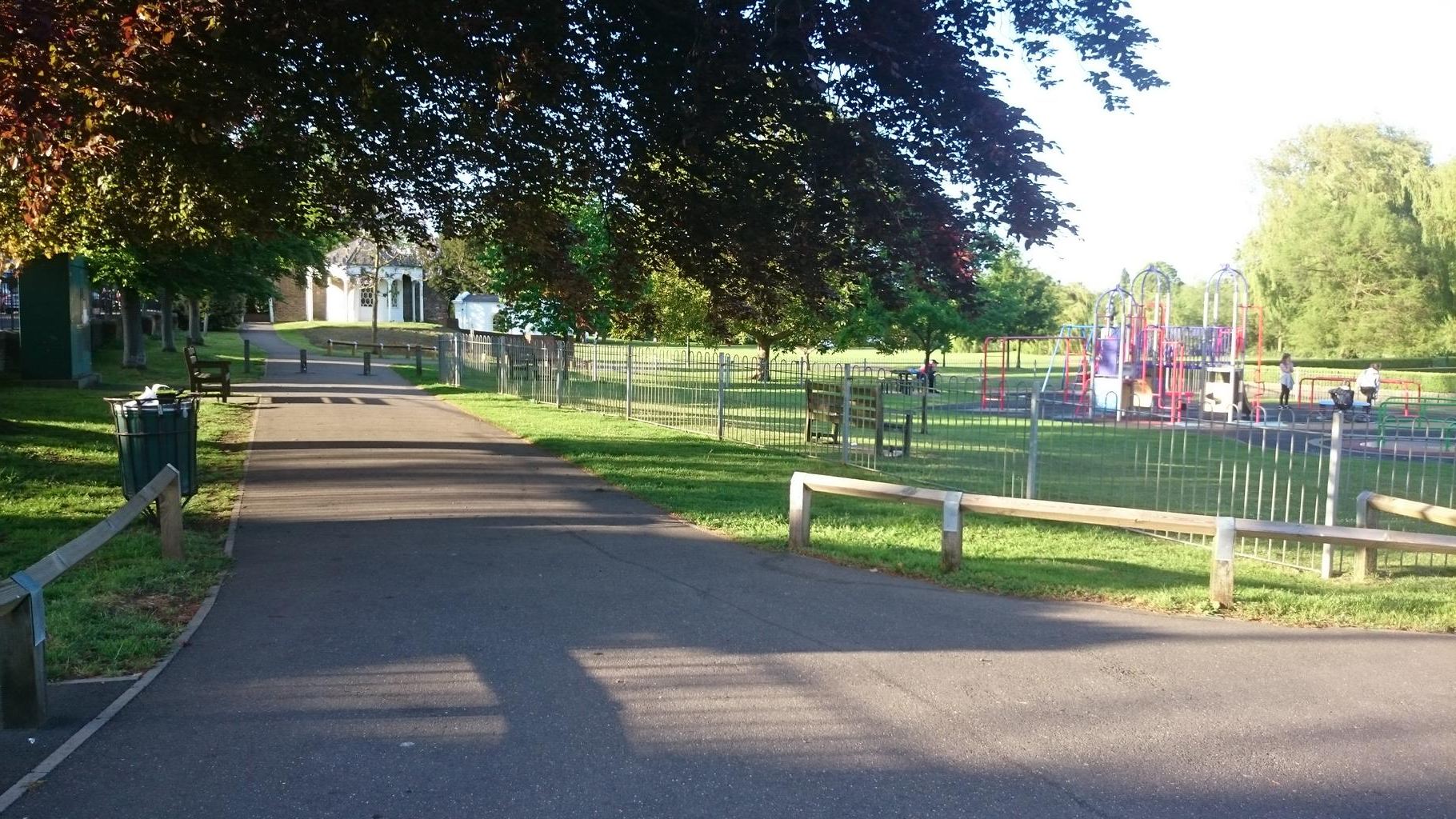
- Interactive map of Radnor Gardens
- Type: Urban park
- Location: Cross Deep, Strawberry Hill London Borough of Richmond upon Thames
- Coordinates: 51.4406°N 0.3321°W
- Created: 1903
- Operator: Richmond upon Thames Borough Council
- Status: Open all year

Radnor Gardens is a small public riverside garden and recreation ground in Strawberry Hill, south of Twickenham in the London Borough of Richmond upon Thames, offering picturesque views. It has a First World War memorial, a grass area, a bowling green and a children's playground.

== Location ==
Radnor Gardens is located 0.5 miles (0.80 km) south of Twickenham town centre between the A310, Cross Deep, and the Thames riverbank. It affords one of the few pedestrian points of access to the river on the Middlesex bank between Twickenham and Kingston Bridge. Flooding of the footpath adjacent to the river is not uncommon, with water often extended a few metres further into the Gardens.

== History and etymology ==
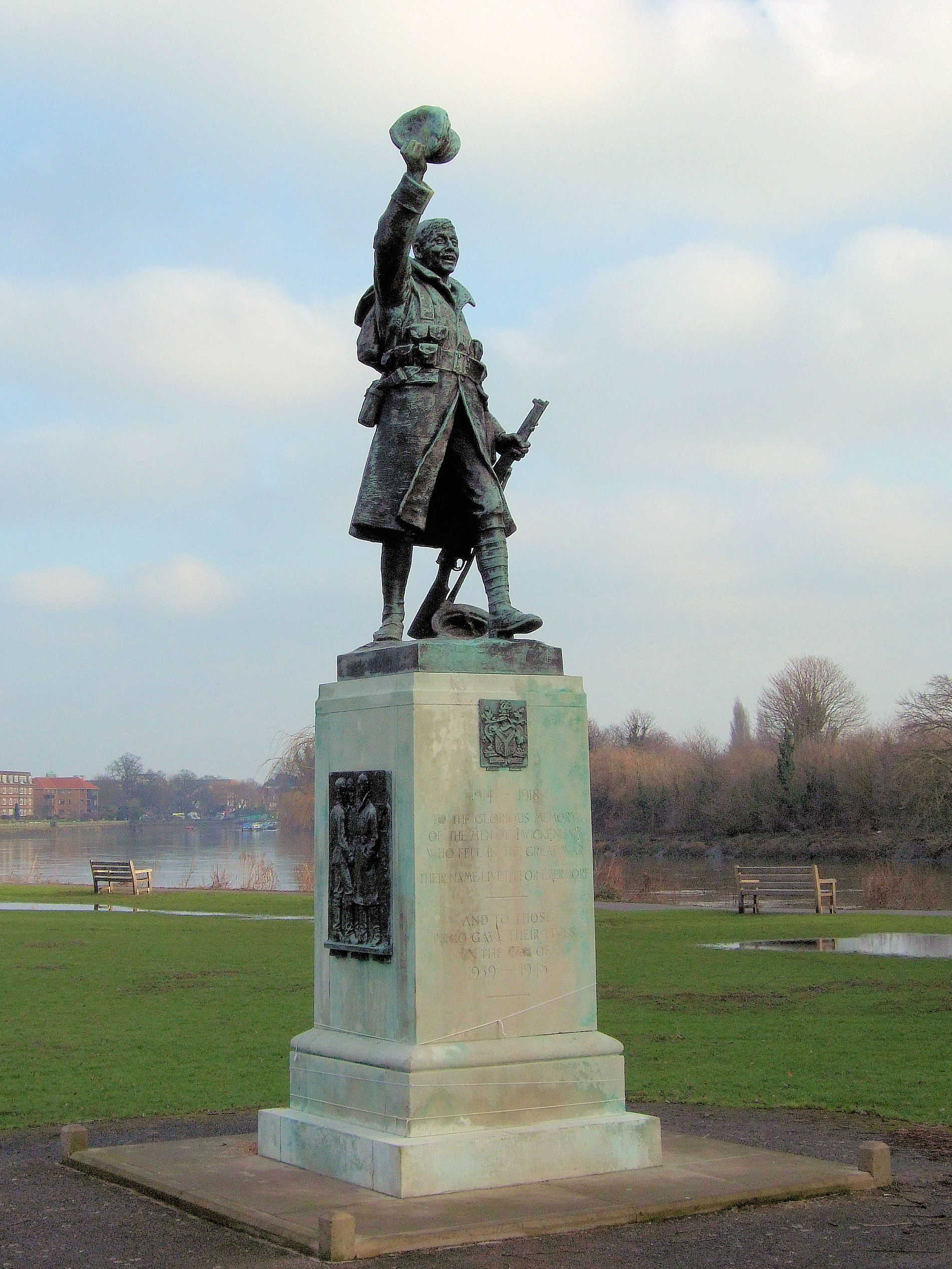
Twickenham War Memorial, Radnor Gardens, erected in 1921

The Gardens were created in 1903 by Twickenham Urban District from several adjacent riverside properties dating back to the 17th century. Radnor House from which the name derives, formed the central section of the gardens, the riverside garden of Cross Deep House provides the southern area, and the grounds of Cross Deep Hall to the north. Several remnants of these form features of the modern gardens including the walls of the base of Radnor House and two gothic structures; a gazebo and Grade II listed polygonal summer house.

After the purchase of Radnor House in 1902, 7,000 cubic yards (5,400 m^{3}) of gravel from the construction of Teddington Lock was used to raise the level of Cross Deep Ait, a former ait adjacent to Swan Island that formed part of the gardens, to protect it from flooding. The two aits are shown as single entity on John Rocque's map of 1746. The channel separating the island from the bank silted up and was filled in the late 1960s. The course of the former channel can be discerned in the lawns during dry weather and metal remnants of connecting footbridges can be perceived lining the central and southern footpaths in the gardens today.

Radnor House and the gardens were officially opened on 11 April 1903.

The bowling green was created in 1920 and has been the home of Strawberry Hill Bowling Club since then. Twickenham War Memorial by Mortimer Brown was erected in 1921, which, despite facing south, was sited to form a focal point of a vista from the Royal Star and Garter Home on Richmond Hill to the north-east. The playground was constructed in 2006.

== Administration ==
The gardens are administered by Richmond upon Thames Borough Council and form the southern limit of the Twickenham conservation area. A local group, Friends of Radnor Gardens, liaises with the local authority and helped develop the PPG 17- compliant 'Radnor Gardens Management Plan'. The gardens have been winners of the Green Flag Award since 2010.
