= Thomas Herne (MP) =

English Tory politician (1674–1716)

Thomas Herne (12 December 1674 – 26 September 1716) was an English Tory politician.

== Biography ==
Herne was the sixth (but third surviving) son of Sir Nathaniel Herne, a prominent London merchant. Herne specialised in trade with Turkey, and in 1703 he was appointed to the committee of the East India Company. He lost his place on the company board the following year. In 1706 he was elected to the House of Commons of England as a Member of Parliament for Bodmin in a by-election on the interest of the local Hoblyn family. At the 1708 British general election, he was chosen to represent Tregony on the interest of the High Tory, John Trevanion. Herne served a second term on the East India Company board from 1708 to 1709. In 1710 he voted with other Tories against the impeachment of Henry Sacheverell. He did not seek re-election at the 1710 British general election.

Parliament of England
Preceded by Francis Robartes; John Hoblyn	Member of Parliament for Bodmin with Francis Robartes; 1706–1708	Succeeded by John Trevanion; Russell Robartes
Parliament of Great Britain
Preceded by John Trevanion; Sir Philip Meadowes	Member of Parliament for Tregony with Anthony Nicoll; 1708–1710	Succeeded by Viscount Rialton; John Trevanion
