= Joseph Sawle =

English Tory politician (c.1673–1737)

Joseph Sawle (c. 1673 – 22 May 1737) was an English Tory politician.

Sawle was the second son of Joseph Sawle (died 1708) and Amy Trevanion. He was educated at the Middle Temple from 1694. Sawle was elected as a Member of Parliament for Tregony in the 1702 English general election on the interest of his relations, the Trevanion family. He was recorded among the Tory Tackers in 1704. He did not stand for re-election in 1705 or at any subsequent election and died in 1737.

Parliament of England
Preceded by Francis Robartes; Hugh Fortescue	Member of Parliament for Tregony with Hugh Boscawen; 1702–1705	Succeeded by John Trevanion; Sir Philip Meadowes
