= Anthony Nicoll =

English Whig politician (1678–1721)

Anthony Nicoll (December 1678 – April/May 1721) was an English lawyer and Whig politician.

== Biography ==
Nicoll was the eldest son of Humphrey Nicoll. He was educated at Pembroke College, Oxford from 1694 and entered the Middle Temple to train in law in 1696. He was called to the bar in 1703.

At the 1708 British general election, Nicoll was returned as the Member of Parliament for Tregony on the recommendation of the influential Cornish Whig, Hugh Boscawen. He voted with other Whigs in favour of the Foreign Protestants Naturalization Bill in March 1709. In 1710 he supported the impeachment of Henry Sacheverell. He did not stand for re-election at the 1710 British general election.

Parliament of Great Britain
Preceded by John Trevanion; Sir Philip Meadowes	Member of Parliament for Tregony with Thomas Herne; 1708–1710	Succeeded by Viscount Rialton; John Trevanion
