= John Hoblyn =

English lawyer and Member of Parliament

John Hoblyn (ca. 1660 – June 1706) was an English lawyer and Member of Parliament. He was the eldest son of Edward Hoblyn and Bridget Carew. He was called to the bar at Middle Temple in 1682, and was Town Clerk of Bodmin from 1692. In 1695 he was elected to Parliament as Member for Bodmin, and retained the seat unopposed until his death. In the House of Commons he generally voted with the Tories.

Some sources erroneously state that the banker Sir John Houblon was elected three times as MP for Bodmin, apparently confusing him with Hoblyn.

== Marriage ==
He was married to Jane Symons in 1682 at Christ Church Greyfriars, London. They didn't have any children. In his will dated 1705, he left his property to his wife and to his brother Thomas. He also left property to his nephew Edward, which included The Barton of Colquite, the manor of Colquite and its mills and lands in St Mabyn, Egloshayle and Bodmin (except Pitt in St Mabyn).

Parliament of England
Preceded by Russell Robartes; Nicholas Glynn	Member of Parliament for Bodmin; 1695–1706; With: Russell Robartes 1695–1702; John Grobham Howe 1702; Francis Robartes 1702–1706	Succeeded by Francis Robartes; Thomas Herne
