= John Trevanion (1667–1740) =

English Tory politician (1667–1740)

John Trevanion (1667 – 15 August 1740) was a British politician who represented several Cornish constituencies in the House of Commons of England and the House of Commons of Great Britain.

== Biography ==
Trevanion was the son of Charles Trevanion of Caerhays and Jane Drummond, a daughter and co-heiress of Sir Maurice Drummond. In 1686, Trevanion was recommended to serve in James II's guards following reports that he had converted to Roman Catholicism and been disinherited by his father. Trevanion had, however, returned to the Church of England by the time of his father's death in 1703, and he represented Blackmore in the Cornish Stannary Parliament of that year.

At the 1705 English general election, Trevanion was elected as a Member of Parliament for Tregony on his family's interest. A contemporary analysis of the House of Commons lists him as a "churchman" and a Tory. At the 1708 British general election he was elected to represent Bodmin. He voted against the impeachment of Henry Sacheverell in early 1710. At the general election that year, he was returned as the MP for Cornwall on the Church interest, despite accusations from his opponents that he was "a professed Roman Catholic". He and George Granville were swept to victory on the back of the chant: "Trevanion and Granville, sound as a bell/For the Queen, the Church, and Sacheverell".

Trevanion was among the MPs tasked with investigating the mismanagement of the Whig Junto. He became a founding member of the October Club and was regarded by Abel Boyer as one of the club's leading figures. He was a relatively inactive member of the Commons, but was loyal to the Harley ministry and on 18 June 1713 he voted for the French commerce bill. Trevanion retained his seat as a Tory at the 1713 British general election. On 15 April 1714 he made his only recorded speech of the Parliament during the debate on the motion that the succession was in danger. He was re-elected at the 1715 British general election, but subsequently transferred his loyalty to the Whig Townshend ministry, possibly to avoid suspicion of any involvement in the Jacobite uprising in Cornwall of 1715. He spoke and voted in favour of the Septennial Act 1715, but voted against the repeal of the Occasional Conformity Act 1711 and Schism Act 1714. He remained in parliament until 1722.

=== Personal life ===
Trevanion married twice. He married first, sometimes before 1705, Anne Blake, a daughter and co-heiress of Sir Francis Black. Following his first wife's death in 1725, he married second Barbara Berkeley, a daughter of William Berkeley, 4th Baron Berkeley of Stratton on 29 March 1726. He had one son, William Trevanion, and two daughters. On inheriting the estate at Caerhays from his father in 1703, Trevanion improved the manor house existing on the site and developed gardens.

Parliament of England
Preceded by Hugh Boscawen; Joseph Sawle	Member of Parliament for Tregony with Sir Philip Meadowes; 1705–1708	Succeeded by Anthony Nicoll; Thomas Herne
Parliament of Great Britain
Preceded by Francis Robartes; Thomas Herne	Member of Parliament for Bodmin with Russell Robartes; 1708–1710	Succeeded by Francis Robartes; Russell Robartes
Preceded by James Buller; Hugh Boscawen	Member of Parliament for Cornwall with George Granville (1710–1712); Sir Richard Vyvyan, Bt (1712–1713); Sir William Carew, Bt (1713–1722); 1710–1722	Succeeded by Sir William Carew, Bt; Sir John St Aubyn, Bt
