= Mortimer Brown =

English sculptor

Mortimer John Brown
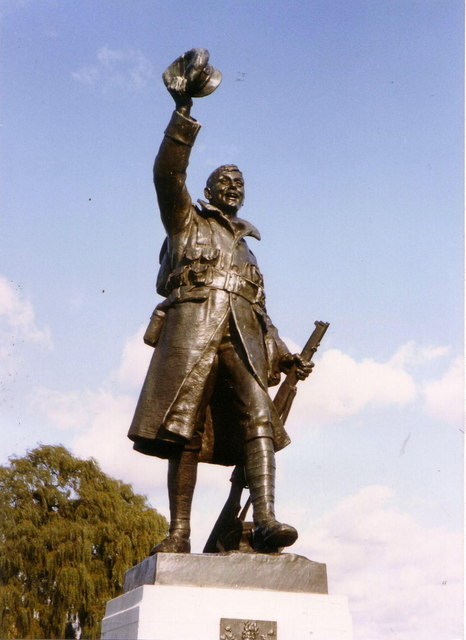
- Twickenham War Memorial, Radnor Gardens, erected 1921
- Born: April 27, 1874; Fenton, Staffordshire
- Died: 1966; Budleigh Salterton, Devon
- Education: National Art Training School, Royal Academy Schools
- Spouse: Gertrude Walter
- Awards: Landseer Scholarship; 1898 (?); British Institution Scholarship Fund; 1898

Mortimer John Brown (27 April 1874 – 1966) was an English sculptor.

== Early life and education ==
Mortimer Brown was born in Fenton, Staffordshire, the son of a brewer and potter's agent. He was educated at Hanley School of Art and the National Art Training School under Edouard Lanteri. From the mid 1890s he studied at the Royal Academy Schools, winning several prizes including the Landseer Scholarship and British Institution Scholarship fund in 1898. He travelled to Italy and Greece to complete his studies.

== Career and works ==
Brown initially worked as an assistant to William Hamo Thornycroft. He exhibited at the Royal Academy from 1900 to 1916 and his statue of John the Baptist attracted particular interest in 1901. Other early work was similarly based on religious and classical themes. His 1911 bronze, The Shepherd Boy, was purchased by the Chantrey Bequest in 1912 and gifted to the Tate Gallery. Possibly his best known work is the Twickenham War Memorial, raised in Radnor Gardens, Twickenham, in 1921.

In 1925, he married Gertrude Walter in Brentford. He spent the remainder of his life at Budleigh Salterton, Devon and died there in 1966 at the age of 92.
