= Hender Robartes =

English politician

Hender Robartes (November 1635 – 31 January 1688) was an English politician who sat in the House of Commons from 1660 to 1687.

Robartes was the younger son of John Robartes, 1st Earl of Radnor and his first wife, Lucy Rich, second daughter of Robert Rich, 2nd Earl of Warwick. He was educated at Felsted School in Essex and Christ's College, Cambridge.

He was a Gentleman of the Privy Chamber from 1661 to 1685.

In 1660, Robartes was elected Member of Parliament for Bodmin in the Convention Parliament. He was re-elected in 1661 for the Cavalier Parliament and after that sat continuously until his death in 1688. Unlike his father, who played a major part in public life, he seems to have been a completely inactive MP.

He died unmarried at the age of 52 and was buried at St Hydroc's church, Lanhydrock.

Robartes was the brother of Robert Robartes and Francis Robartes.
