= Teddington Urban District =

Former local government area in the UK

Coordinates: 51.43°N 0.33°W

Teddington
- Area
  - 1911: 1,214 acres (4.9 km^{2})
  - 1931: 1,214 acres (4.9 km^{2})
- Population
  - 1901: 14,037
  - 1931: 23,
- History
  - Created: 1894
  - Abolished: 1937
  - Succeeded by: Municipal Borough of Twickenham
- Status: Urban district

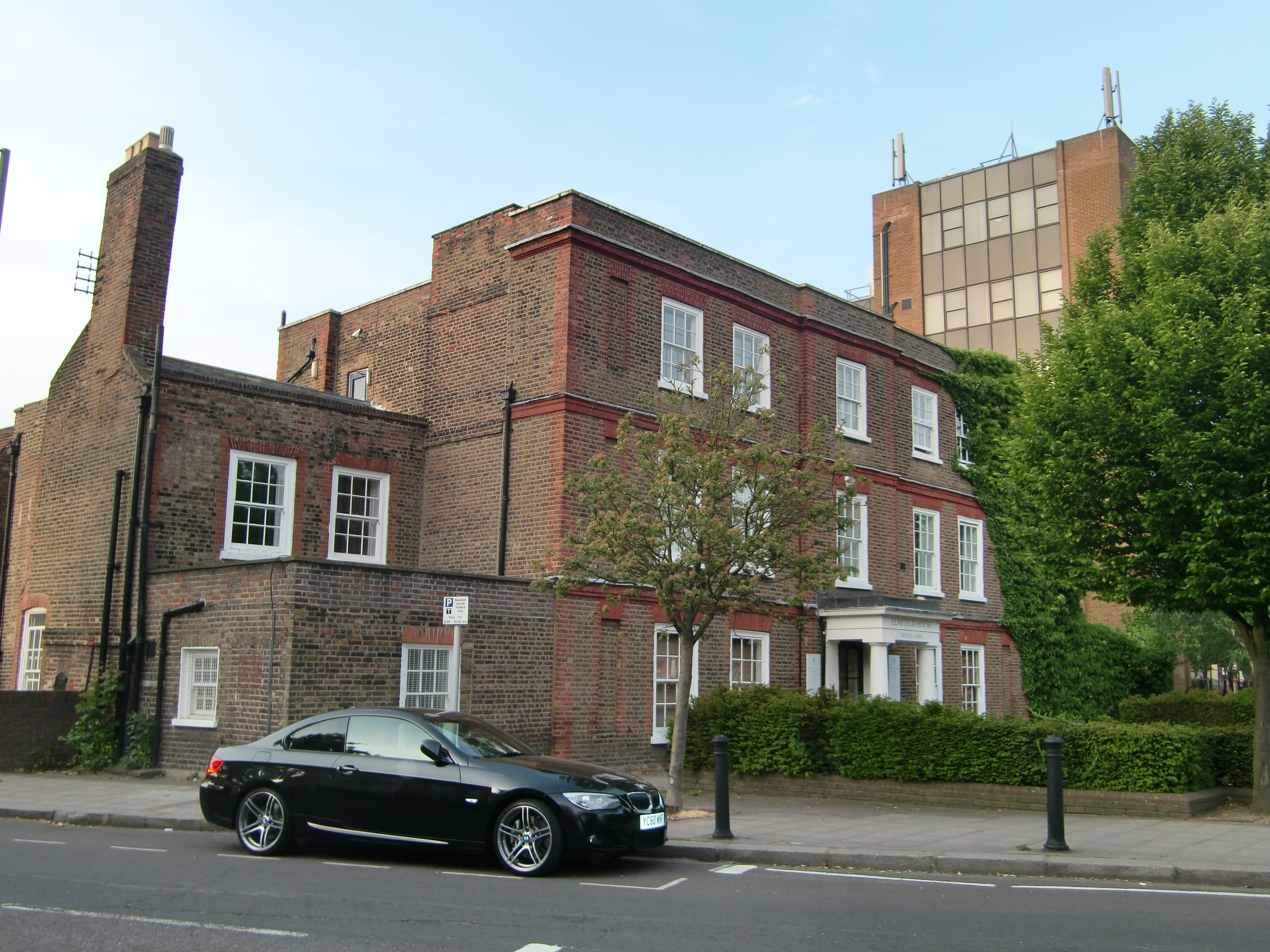
Elmfield House, Teddington

Teddington was a local government district in west Middlesex around the village of Teddington from 1894 to 1937.

Teddington Urban District succeeded the local board of health following the Local Government Act 1894. The board had purchased Elmfield House in the High Street shortly before it was dissolved and the fifteen-member Urban Council used it for meetings and offices until its dissolution. In 1900 the urban district was divided into four wards; Fulwell, Lower Teddington, Upper Teddington and South Teddington.

The urban district was abolished in 1934, when a county review order included its area in an enlarged Municipal Borough of Twickenham. However, local resistance to the proposal delayed implementation and the District continued to function until 1937. Elmfield House remained in use as council offices and was Grade II listed in 1952. It was subsequently sold in 2008 and converted to mixed use as private flats and a dental practice.
