= John Bodvel =

Welsh politician (1617–1663)

John Bodvel (1617 – March 1663) was a Welsh politician who sat in the House of Commons of England (and Wales) from 1640 to 1644. He was a colonel in the Royalist army in the English Civil War.

Bodvel was the son of Sir John Bodvel (died 1631) and his wife Elizabeth Wynn, daughter of Sir John Wynn of Gwydir and Sidney Gerard. He was admitted to Middle Temple in 1633.

Bodvel's grandfather had acquired by marriage the estate of Caerfryn on Anglesey and in April 1640, Bodvel was elected member of parliament for Anglesey in the Short Parliament. He was re-elected MP for Anglesey for the Long Parliament in November 1640. He stood with the militant Protestants who opposed the court, and was nominated as Deputy Lieutenant of Caernarvonshire in March 1642. On 2 August 1642, he was given leave of absence by the House of Commons and provided with a stock of arms with which to defend his home in Wales.

However, by May 1643 Bodvel had become a Commissioner of array for Caernarvonshire and a Custos Rotulorum of Anglesey. He attended King Charles' Oxford Parliament in January 1644 and was awarded the degree of D.C.L. from Oxford University. When the Oxford Parliament adjourned in July 1644, Bodvel went with his family to Caerfryn and became governor of Caernarvon Castle from March 1646. As colonel and commissioner of array, he helped in both the defence of the island of Anglesey and in the negotiations for its surrender in July 1646. His wife, Anne Russell, was a strong Puritan and in 1646 she appealed to the Lords to have their children removed from their father's custody because he set a bad example, and for alimony to support herself and the children. His estates were sequestered in November 1647 and he was further fined for supporting the Royalist rising of 1648 in Anglesey. After the execution of the King, he fled abroad, and when he returned his name was listed in the Act of 1651 for the sale of delinquents' estates. These sales were cancelled in 1652 and he was finally cleared of delinquency in April 1655.

Bodvel married Ann Russell, daughter of Sir William Russell, 1st Baronet, of Chippenham and his second wife Elizabeth Gerard, in September 1638 but there was no male heir. In 1657 his wife arranged a marriage between their second daughter Sarah and Robert Robartes, son of John Robartes, 1st Earl of Radnor, a wealthy Cornish Presbyterian and former Parliamentarian field-marshal. The marriage was without Bodvel's consent and he refused to recognize the match. After the Restoration of Charles II, probably mindful of the Earl of Radnor's prominent role in Government, where he held office as Lord Privy Seal, he relented and promised to make his grandson Charles Bodvel Robartes his heir. However, Bodvel's distant cousin Thomas Wynn of Boduan hid him from creditors in London, where he made a new will leaving his estates to Wynn's son Griffith and another distant cousin. After Bodvel's death in March 1663 Lord Robartes and his son contested the will in Chancery and the House of Lords and obtained an Act of Parliament which set it aside in favour of Charles Robartes. The case aroused great public interest and was described by Samuel Pepys in his celebrated Diary.

Parliament of England
Vacant Parliament suspended since 1629	Member of Parliament for Anglesey; 1640–1644	Succeeded by Richard Wood
