= Robert Robartes, Viscount Bodmin =

English diplomat and politician (1634–1682)

Robert Robartes, Viscount Bodmin (7 February 1634 – 8 February 1682) was an English diplomat and politician who sat in the House of Commons between 1660 and 1679. He was later ambassador to Denmark.

Robartes was the eldest son of John Robartes, 1st Earl of Radnor and his wife Lucy Rich, second daughter of Robert Rich, 2nd Earl of Warwick. He was educated at Felsted School in Essex and Christ's College, Cambridge

In 1660, Robartes was elected Member of Parliament for Cornwall in the Convention Parliament. He was elected MP (Member of Parliament) for Bossiney in 1661 for the Cavalier Parliament and sat until 1679.

He was ambassador to Denmark in 1681.

Robartes died in 1682 at the court of Denmark at the age of 48, predeceasing his father. He had married Sarah, second daughter of John Bodvel of Bodville Castle, North Wales and his wife Anne Russell, with whom he had two sons. The marriage displeased her father, whose consent had not been asked, and led him to disinherit his daughter in favour of a distant cousin. The Robartes family eventually regained the inheritance, but only after protracted litigation, which is described by Samuel Pepys in his famous Diary.

He was succeeded by his eldest son, Charles (1660–1723), to whom the title of Earl of Radnor later descended from Robert's father, and who was mentioned by Jonathan Swift in his Journal to Stella. His younger son, Russell, became a Teller of the Exchequer and an MP.
