= Strawberry Hill, London =

Suburb of London

Coordinates: 51.4381°N 0.3350°W

Strawberry Hill
- Location within Greater London
- OS grid reference: TQ155725
- London borough: Richmond
- Ceremonial county: Greater London
- Region: London
- Country: England
- Sovereign state: United Kingdom
- Post town: TWICKENHAM
- Postcode district: TW1, TW2
- Dialling code: 020
- Police: Metropolitan
- Fire: London
- Ambulance: London
- UK Parliament: Twickenham
- London Assembly: South West

Strawberry Hill is an area of the London Borough of Richmond upon Thames in Twickenham. It is a suburban development situated 10.4 miles (16.7 km) west south-west of Charing Cross. It consists of a number of residential roads centred on a small development of shops, including a pharmacy, post office, off licence, hairdressing salon and grocery store. Residents are served by Strawberry Hill railway station, where trains run to London Waterloo from both platforms – via Kingston and Richmond respectively.

The area's ACORN demographic type is characterised as well-off professionals, larger houses, and converted flats. St Mary's University, Twickenham, the country's oldest Roman Catholic University, is situated on Waldegrave Road. Its sports grounds were used as a training site for the 2012 Olympics.

The folk-rock band the Strawbs were originally called the Strawberry Hill Boys. The founding members were students at St. Mary's University, Twickenham, then St. Mary's Teacher Training College, Strawberry Hill and, because they were in their initial incarnation playing bluegrass, thought it apt to have 'hill' in the band name.

== Strawberry Hill House & Garden ==
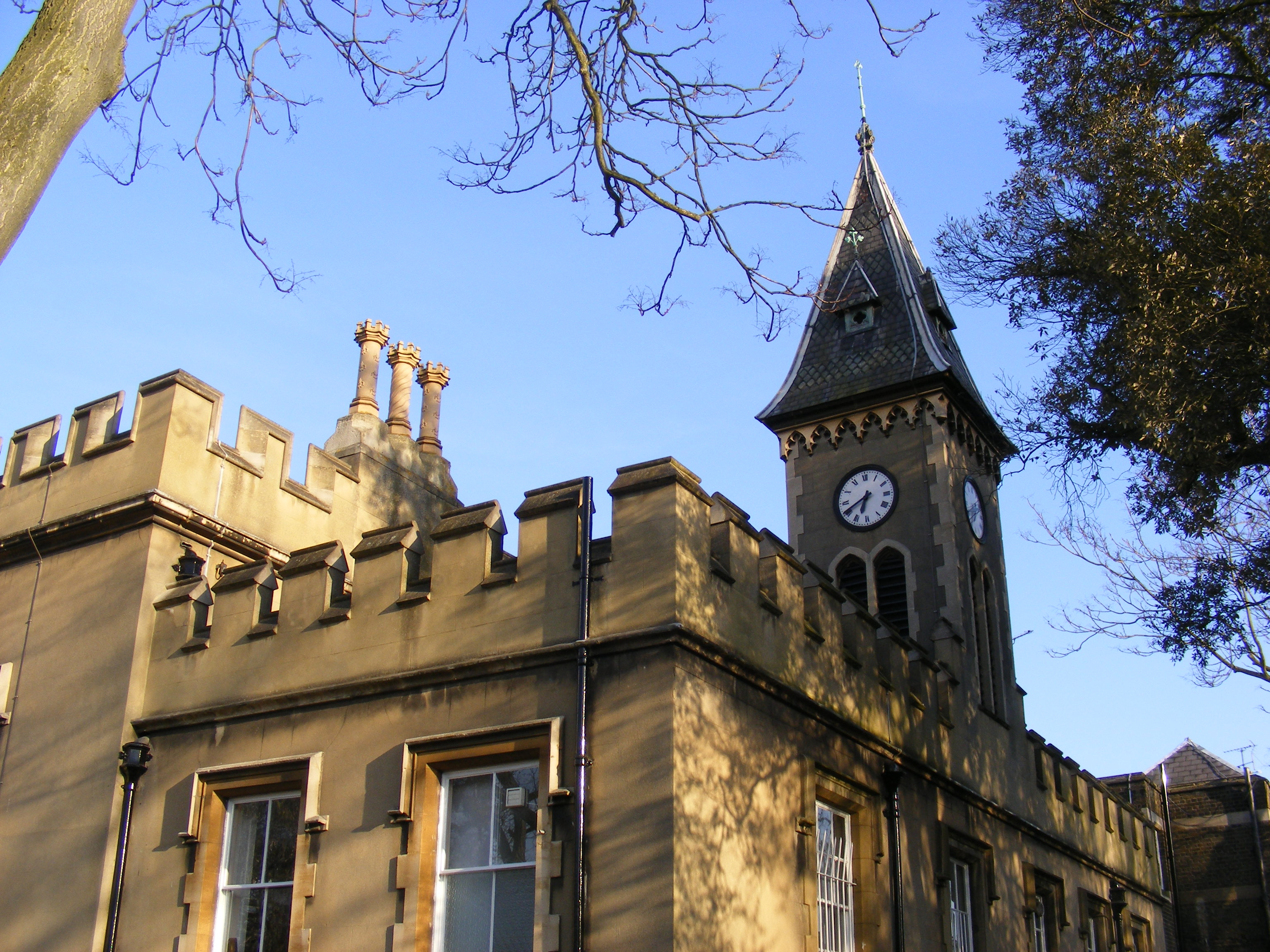
A tower at the Strawberry Hill gothic villa

The eighteenth-century development is named after "Strawberry Hill", the fanciful Gothic Revival villa designed by author Horace Walpole between 1749 and 1776. It began as a small 17th century house "little more than a cottage", with only 5 acres (20,000 m^{2}) of land and ended up as a "little Gothic castle" in 46 acres (190,000 m^{2}). The original owner had named the house "Chopped Straw Hall", but Walpole wanted it to be called something more distinctive and after finding an old lease that described his land as "Strawberry Hill Shot", he adopted this name.

After a £9 million, two year restoration, Strawberry Hill House re-opened to the public in October 2010. It housed famous eighteenth-century literary figures such as Alexander Pope and Horace Walpole.

== Other attractions ==
Other local attractions include:

- St Mary's University, Twickenham
- Radnor Gardens
- Strawberry Hill railway station, built in 1873, is an example of the Victorian era railway building boom.
- Strawberry Hill Golf Course, opened in 1900 and designed by 5-time Open champion, JH Taylor

== Notes ==
- Jones, E. and Woodward, C. A Guide to the Architecture of London, 1983, Weidenfeld & Nicolson, London
