= Municipal Borough of Twickenham =

Former local government area in the UK

Coordinates: 51.4478°N 0.3244°W

Twickenham
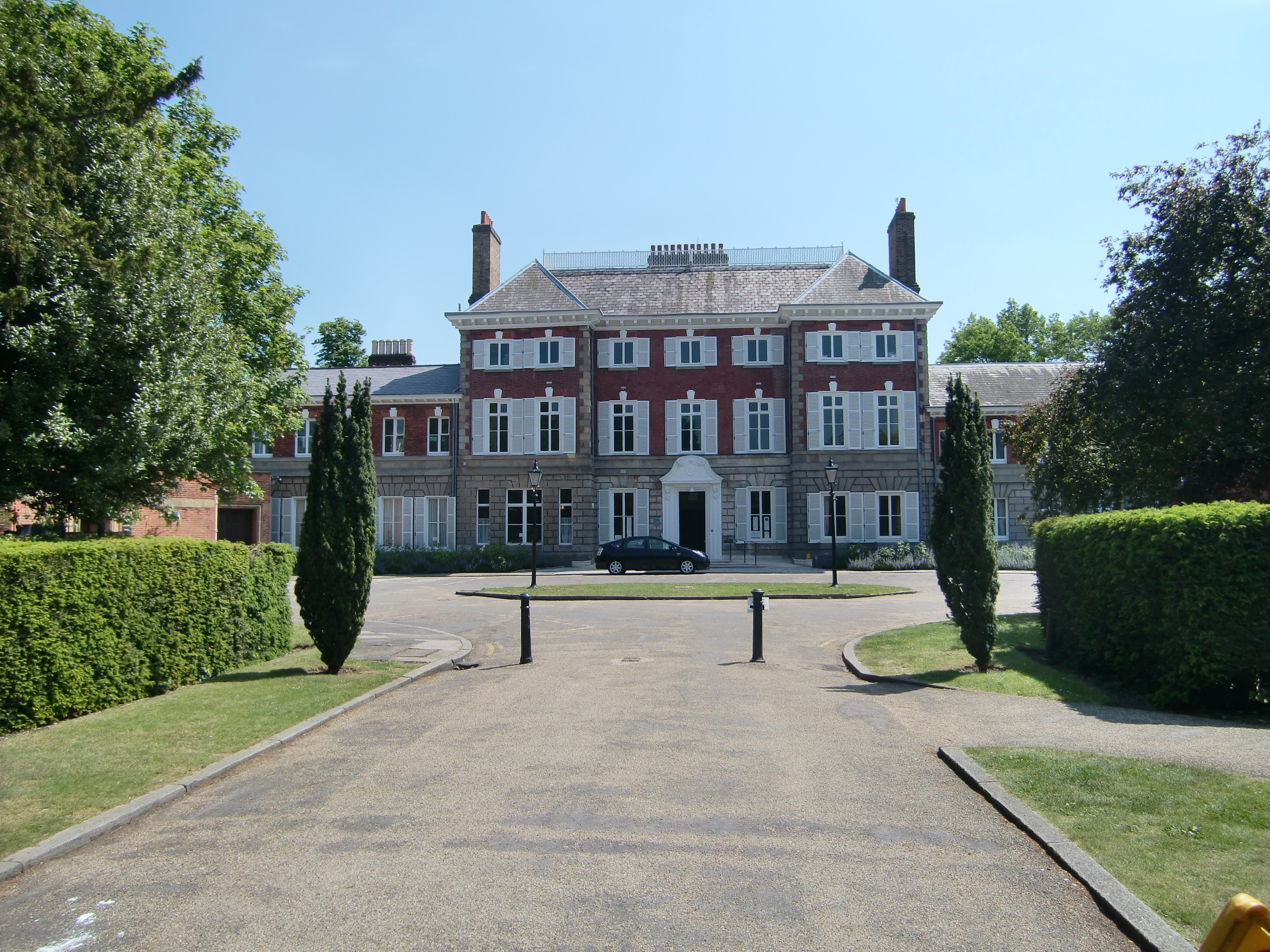
- York House

- Twickenham within Middlesex in 1961
- Area
  - 1901: 2,421 acres (9.8 km^{2})
  - 1965: 7,014 acres (28.4 km^{2})
- Population
  - 1901: 20,991
  - 1961: 100,971
- History
  - Created: 1868
  - Abolished: 1965
  - Succeeded by: London Borough of Richmond upon Thames
- Status: Local board 1868 – 1894; Urban district 1894 – 1926; Municipal borough 1926 – 1965
- Government
  - HQ: Twickenham
  - Motto: Looking Backward, Looking Forward
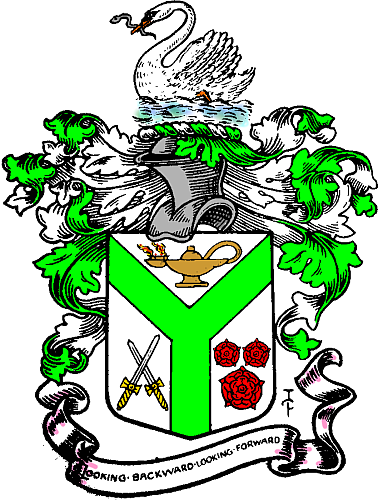
- Coat of arms of the borough council

Twickenham was a local government district in Middlesex, England from 1868 to 1965.

== History ==
Twickenham Local Government District was formed in 1868, when the civil parish of Twickenham adopted the Local Government Act 1858. The district was governed by a local board of 27 members.

The Local Government Act 1894 reconstituted the area of the local board as Twickenham Urban District. Twickenham Urban District Council (UDC), consisting of 24 councillors representing 4 wards, replaced the local board.

In 1926 Twickenham was granted a charter of incorporation to become a municipal borough. The borough council consisted of a mayor, 8 aldermen and 24 councillors, and was divided into 8 wards.

In 1934 the borough was extended by a county review order: the urban districts of Hampton, Hampton Wick and Teddington were all absorbed by Twickenham. The borough council was increased in size with 10 aldermen and 30 councillors representing 10 wards. The number of wards was later increased to 11.

The local board met in rented rooms until 1881, when it moved to Queen's Hall in King Street. In 1924 Twickenham UDC purchased the historic York House, and after restoration this became the offices for the borough.

The borough was abolished in 1965 with the creation of Greater London. It became part of the London Borough of Richmond upon Thames, along with the Municipal Borough of Barnes and the Municipal Borough of Richmond, both from Surrey. However, York House, which had previously been Twickenham's town hall, would become the municipal headquarters of the new borough.

== Coat of arms ==
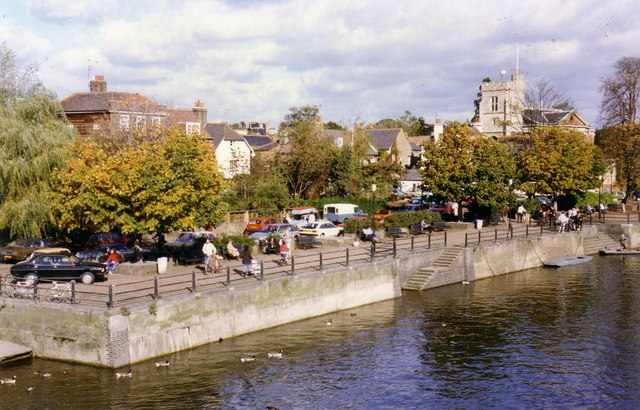
Incorporated was the tower of the church at Twickenham, a surviving medieval building in the town

The Twickenham Urban District Council was granted a coat of arms by the College of Arms in 1913. The name "Twickenham" means two ways (roads) settlement or two-farm settlement, and the main device on the shield was a green pall or Y-shaped figure to illustrate the first reading which also resembles the arms of Diocese of Canterbury, which had historical links with the area. At the top of the shield was an antique lamp for literature, arts and sciences. At the dexter side were crossed swords, the emblem of the arms of the Diocese of London. These represented Twickenham's first appearance in historical records where Waldhere, Bishop of London was granted land in AD 704. The three red roses came from the arms of William of Wykeham (d. 1404) who had built the tower of the parish church of St Mary.

The crest above the shield was a swan on water with an eel in its beak. This represented the River Thames, a long boundary of the town for three miles (5 km). The eel was for Eel Pie Island.

The municipal borough inherited the arms in 1926 and were unaltered when the borough was extended in 1934.

The swan crest became that of the London Borough of Richmond upon Thames in 1965.
