= Baron Robartes =

British peer

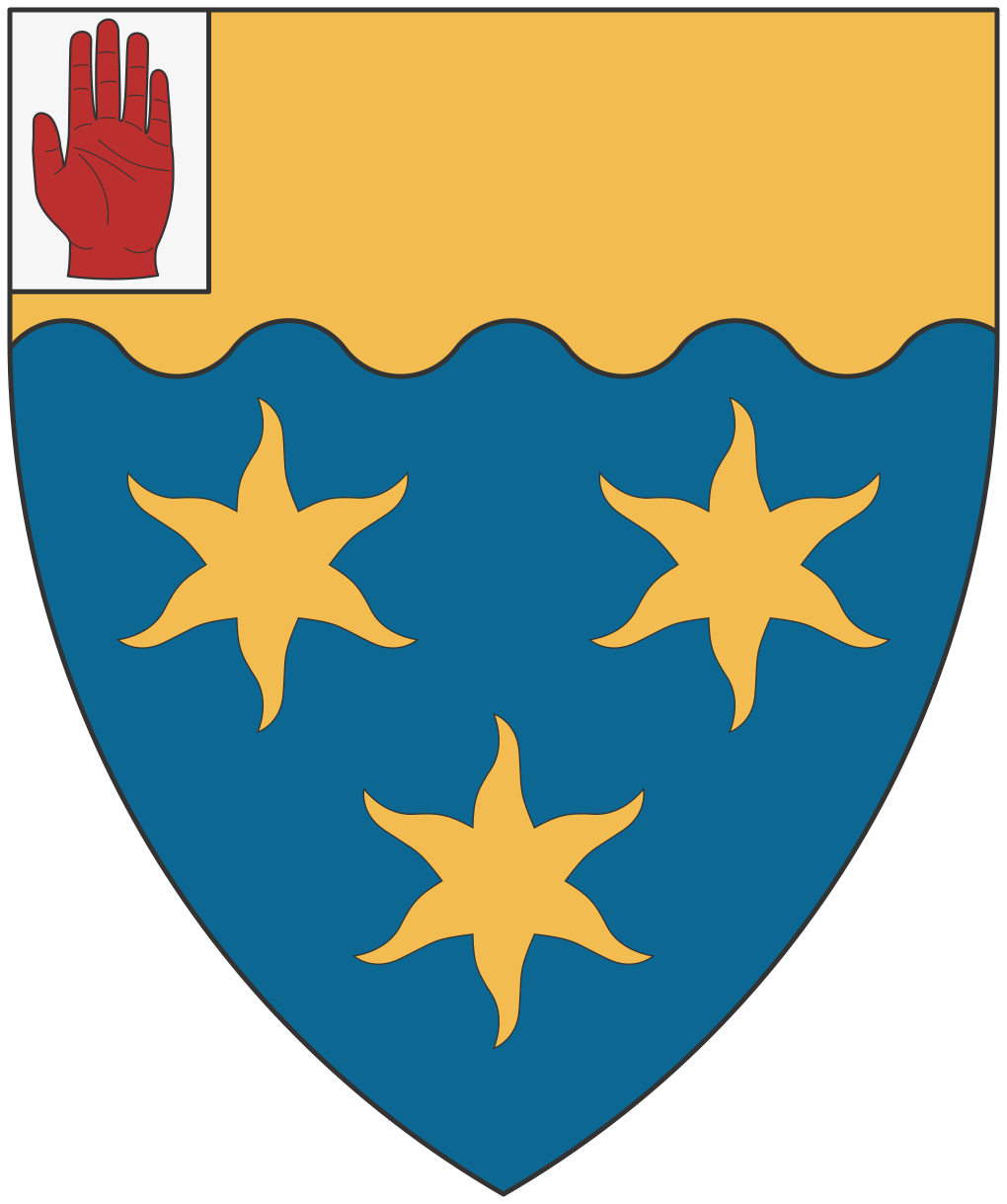
The coat of arms of the Robartes baronets.

Baron Robartes was a title that was created twice in British history. It was first created in the Peerage of England on 26 January 1625 for Sir Richard Robartes, 1st Baronet. This creation became extinct in 1757.

The second creation came in the Peerage of the United Kingdom on 13 December 1869 for Thomas Agar-Robartes.
