= John Vivian (1750–1826) =

British industrialist (1750–1826)

John Vivian (1750 – 7 December 1826) was a British industrialist. Himself a descendant of the Vivians of Trewan, Cornwall, he was the first member of this branch of the family to settle in South Wales, where he became the ancestor of the Vivian baronets and barons. He was the son of Reverend Thomas Vivian (died 17 March 1793) and Mary Hussey (1 February 1719 – circa 24 December 1807), of Truro St. Mary, Cornwall, who had been married on 30 November 1747 at Kenwyn, Cornwall.

== Career ==
About 1800, John Vivian moved from Truro in Cornwall to Swansea in South Wales and assumed the post of managing partner in the copper works at Penclawdd and Loughor owned by the Cheadle Brasswire Company of Staffordshire. By 1806 his second son, John Henry Vivian (1785–1855), was made manager of the copper works at Penclawdd. In 1808–1810, the Vivians leased land at the Hafod in Swansea from the Duke of Beaufort and the Earl of Jersey for use by their new firm of Vivian & Sons. The Vivian copper mining, smelting and trading businesses in Swansea eventually developed into the largest conglomerate of its kind in South Wales, and the Vivian family did much to develop Swansea into a city, in much the same way as the Marquesses of Bute drove the development of Cardiff. The partners in the family business were John Vivian and his two elder sons, John Henry (1785–1855) and Richard (1775–1842). Richard was the older but was fully occupied in his military career; it was John Henry who became managing partner in the company. Richard later commanded the 6th Brigade of the Earl of Uxbridge's Cavalry Division in the Battle of Waterloo and was created Baron Vivian in 1841. John Henry's son Henry was created Baron Swansea in 1893.

== Marriage ==
On 24 August 1774, John Vivian married Elizabeth Cranch (died 1816), a daughter of the Reverend Richard Cranch, by whom he had four children:

1. Hussey Vivian, 1st Baron Vivian (1775–1842), who married and had children (see the Vivian barons)
2. Lucy Ann Vivian (31 August 1776 – c. 29 June 1779), who died in infancy
3. John Henry Vivian (1785–1855), industrialist, who married and had children, including:
  1. Henry Vivian, 1st Baron Swansea (1821–1894), who married and had children (see the Swansea barons)
  2. Sir Arthur Vivian (1834–1926), who married and had children
  3. Glynn Vivian (1835–1910), founder of the Glynn Vivian Art Gallery
4. Thomas Vivian (16 January 1800 – 13 September 1821), who died unmarried
