= Glynn Vivian =

British art collector and philanthropist

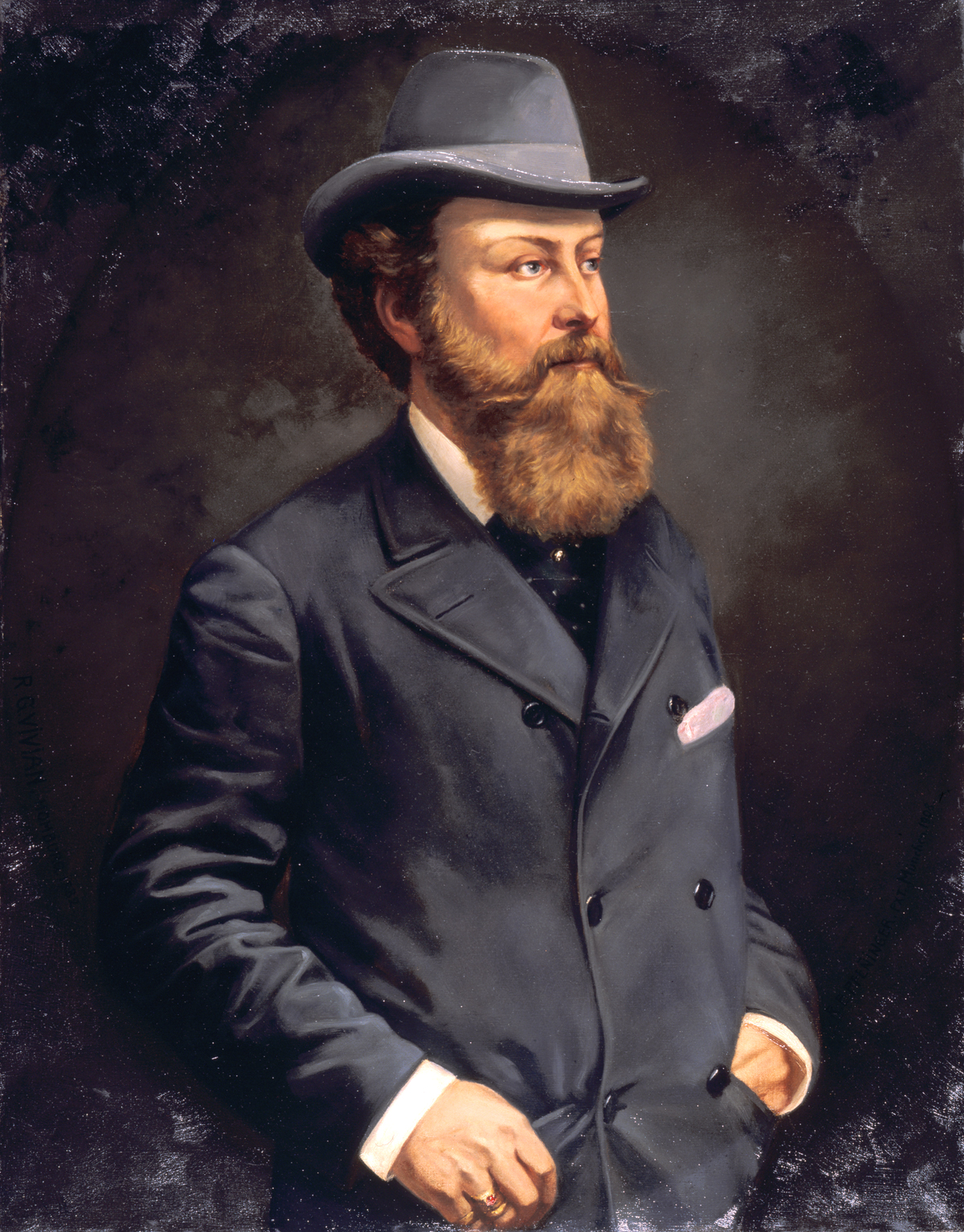
Richard Glynn Vivian by Pfeninger

Richard Glynn Vivian (31 August 1835 – 7 June 1910) was a British art collector and philanthropist from the Vivian family, and the founder of the Glynn Vivian Art Gallery in Swansea.

== Biography ==
Born on 31 August 1835, Richard Glynn Vivian was the seventh child and fourth and youngest son of the nine children of industrialist John Henry Vivian and his wife Sarah, daughter of Arthur Jones, of Reigate. His brothers were Henry Vivian (b. 1821), William Graham Vivian (b. 1827) and Arthur Vivian (b. 1834) (who became industrialists and politicians). His uncle was Hussey Vivian, 1st Baron Vivian, a hero of Waterloo. He graduated from Cambridge University as M.A.

In February 1855, when he was nineteen years old, his father died, and he inherited a quarter of his father's copper business, Vivian & Sons; but leaving his brothers to be involved in the copper industry he chose to travel and pursue the arts. He gradually built a large art collection.

He became a burgess of Swansea, and a Deputy Lieutenant.

In 1885 on 11 March he married Laura Hermione Beatrice Halkett, the only daughter of Henry Craigie Halkett; but six years later, on 6 June 1891, she divorced him.

In 1898 he bought Sketty Hall, Swansea, installed his art collections there and began improving the house and its grounds. But in March 1902 he became almost blind – an event described in his book, E Tenebris Lux, dictated in 1906. This development affected him deeply, strengthening his Christian faith and prompting him to use his wealth to serve the needs of others. In 1905, visiting Brighton, he was moved by the preaching of James Philips, pastor of the Union Street Mission. In 1906 he established the Glynn Vivian Miners' Mission and endowed it with £30,000, and helped start a mission hall in Swansea; its first pastor was Herbert Voke, who had been Glynn Vivian's assistant. In 1908 a second miners' mission was established in Japan, and others followed around the world (the Glynn Vivian Miners' Mission still exists today as the International Miners' Mission). He also established near Swansea the Glynn Vivian Rest Home for the Blind, at Caswell Bay in Gower.

In 1905 he offered his collection of paintings, drawings and china to Swansea Corporation, who with his endowment built the Glynn Vivian Art Gallery to house it. Vivian laid the foundation stone on 14 May 1909, but he died at his London home on 7 June 1910, just over a year before the gallery was opened by his brother, Graham.
