= List of baronetcies in the Baronetage of the United Kingdom: V =

Peerages and baronetcies of Britain and Ireland
Extant	All
Dukes	Dukedoms
Marquesses	Marquessates
Earls	Earldoms
Viscounts	Viscountcies
Barons	Baronies
Baronets	Baronetcies
En, Ire, NS, GB, UK (extinct)

This is a list of baronetcies in the Baronetage of the United Kingdom. They have been created since 1801 when they replaced the baronetages in the Baronetage of Great Britain, and Baronetage of Ireland. This list is not currently complete.

Title	Date of creation	Surname	Current status	Notes
Vassar-Smith of Charlton Park	1917	Vassar-Smith	extant	
Vaughan-Morgan of Outwood	1960	Vaughan-Morgan	extinct 1995	first Baronet created a life peer as Baron Reigate in 1970
Vavasour of Alverstoke	1828	Vavasour	extant	
Vavasour of Spaldington	1801	Vavasour	extinct 1912	
Verdin of The Brockhurst and Wimboldsley	1896	Verdin	extinct 1920	
Verner of Verners Bridge	1846	Verner	extinct 1975	
Verney of Eaton Square	1946	Verney	dormant	second Baronet died 1993
Vernon of Hanbury Hall	1885	Vernon	extinct 1940	
Vernon of Shotwick Park	1914	Vernon	extant	
Vestey of Bessemer House	1913	Vestey	extant	first Baronet created Baron Vestey in 1922
Vestey of Shirley	1921	Vestey	extant	
Vivian of Singleton	1882	Vivian	extant	first Baronet created Baron Swansea in 1893
Vivian of Truro	1828	Vivian	extant	first Baronet created Baron Vivian in 1841
