= Blackpill, Swansea =

Suburb in Swansea, Wales

Coordinates: 51.5954°N 3.9963°W

Blackpill
- Location within Swansea
- OS grid reference: SS618903
- Principal area: Swansea
- Preserved county: West Glamorgan
- Country: Wales
- Sovereign state: United Kingdom
- Post town: SWANSEA
- Postcode district: SA3
- Dialling code: 01792
- Police: South Wales
- Fire: Mid and West Wales
- Ambulance: Welsh
- UK Parliament: Swansea West
- Senedd Cymru – Welsh Parliament: Swansea West

Blackpill (or Black Pill) is a suburban area of Swansea, Wales, beside Swansea Bay, about 3 miles (4.8 km) southwest of the city centre.

== Description ==
Blackpill falls into the Mayals ward.

The area is centred on a seafront building on Mumbles Road, which once served as a station and power station for the Swansea and Mumbles Railway; today, it houses a cafe called "The Junction". The land between Mumbles Road and Blackpill beach is used as Blackpill Lido, a family and children's play area which is popular in summer. Also on Mumbles Road is 'The Woodman', a local pub, and Blackpill Post Office.

Behind the Woodman, to the left of the main entrance to Clyne Gardens, is Clyne Chapel. The chapel was built in 1907 by Graham Vivian, who owned the nearby Clyne Castle and its estate, as the private chapel for his family. Although Vivian specified that it should have no stained glass windows to distract from the beauty of its surroundings, there are within it a range of notable artefacts that he collected on his tours to Italy. Clyne Chapel is a Grade II listed building and serves as the Anglican church for the local community.

The southern entrance to the Clyne valley cycle track is just across the road from the boating lake area. This cycle track runs through the Clyne Valley Country Park to Killay, Dunvant, and Gowerton, following the route of a former railway line, which formed the start of the Heart of Wales Line prior to the Beeching Axe of the 1960s.

Sloping uphill to the west of Blackpill are Clyne Gardens (Gerddi Clun), the landscaped former park of Clyne Castle. Built in the late 18th century and much altered, the building was for half a century a university hall, but is now converted to flats. Replacing demolished 20th-century student accommodation blocks is an estate of luxury futuristic houses built by Holder Mathias Architects, which were nominated for a RIBA award.

A Territorial Army barracks is just off the Mumbles Road leading up to West Cross.

== Leisure ==
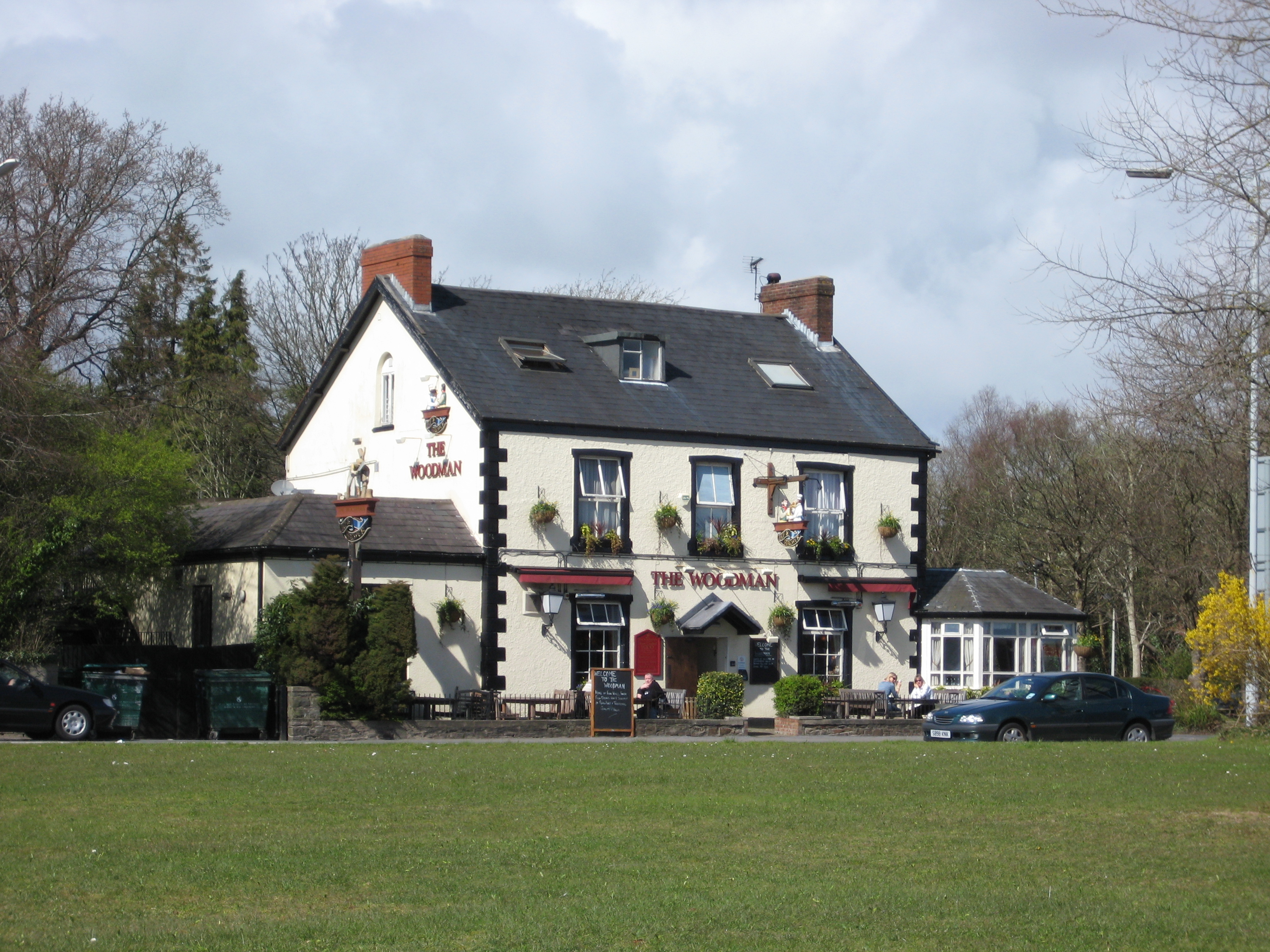
'The Woodman' Public House at the entrance to Clyne Gardens

Blackpill has leisure facilities such as a former boating lake, which was here for about thirty years and has now been converted into a shallow paddling pool. North of the boating lake was a mini golf course sandwiched between a carriageway and cycle track. Blackpill Pitch-and-Putt, despite its name, is actually within the Sketty electoral ward; in 2016, it was converted to a footgolf course.

== Blackpill Beach ==
Blackpill Beach is an area known for wildlife and wildlife watchers. Large numbers of wading birds and a variety of gulls, some rare, gather here at high tide. The beach and the stream that flows out of the area is a designated Site of Special Scientific Interest.
