= Singleton Abbey =

- Abaty Singleton
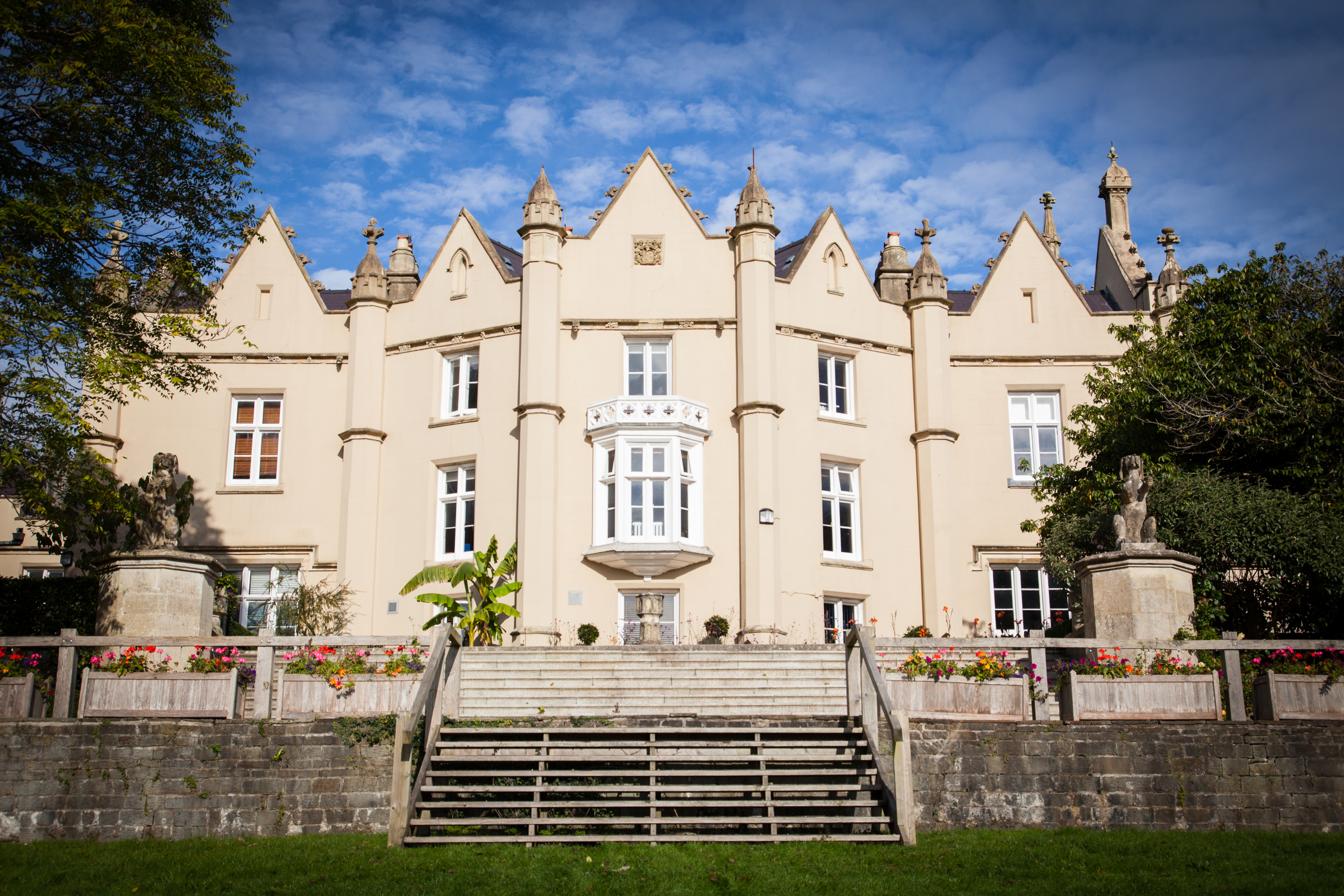
- Former names: Marino

General information
- Location: Singleton Park
- Country: Wales
- Coordinates: 51.6105°N 3.9761°W
- Year(s) built: 1784
- Owner: Swansea University

Height
- Architectural: Tudor Style

Design and construction
- Architect(s): Peter Frederick Robinson

Singleton Abbey (Welsh: Abaty Singleton) is a large, mainly 19th-century mansion in Swansea, Wales. Today, the buildings are used to house administration offices for Swansea University. They can be found at the eastern end of the Swansea University Singleton Park campus.

== History ==
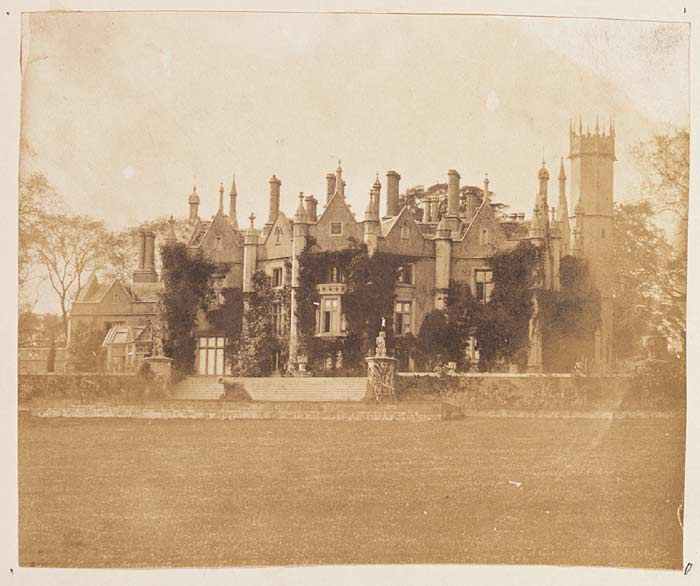
Singleton in 1854

The nucleus of the house is a neo-classical villa, octagonal in plan, erected in 1784 under the name of Marino by Edward King, a customs official. In 1817 this was bought by the industrialist John Henry Vivian, who added rectangular one-bay extensions to either side. In 1823 Vivian commissioned the architect P. F. Robinson to re-model the house in the neo-Gothic style. Work started in 1827, and a decade later Robinson published Domestic Architecture in the Tudor Style, a monograph in all but name on Singleton Abbey. The house then served as residence of the Vivian family for several years.

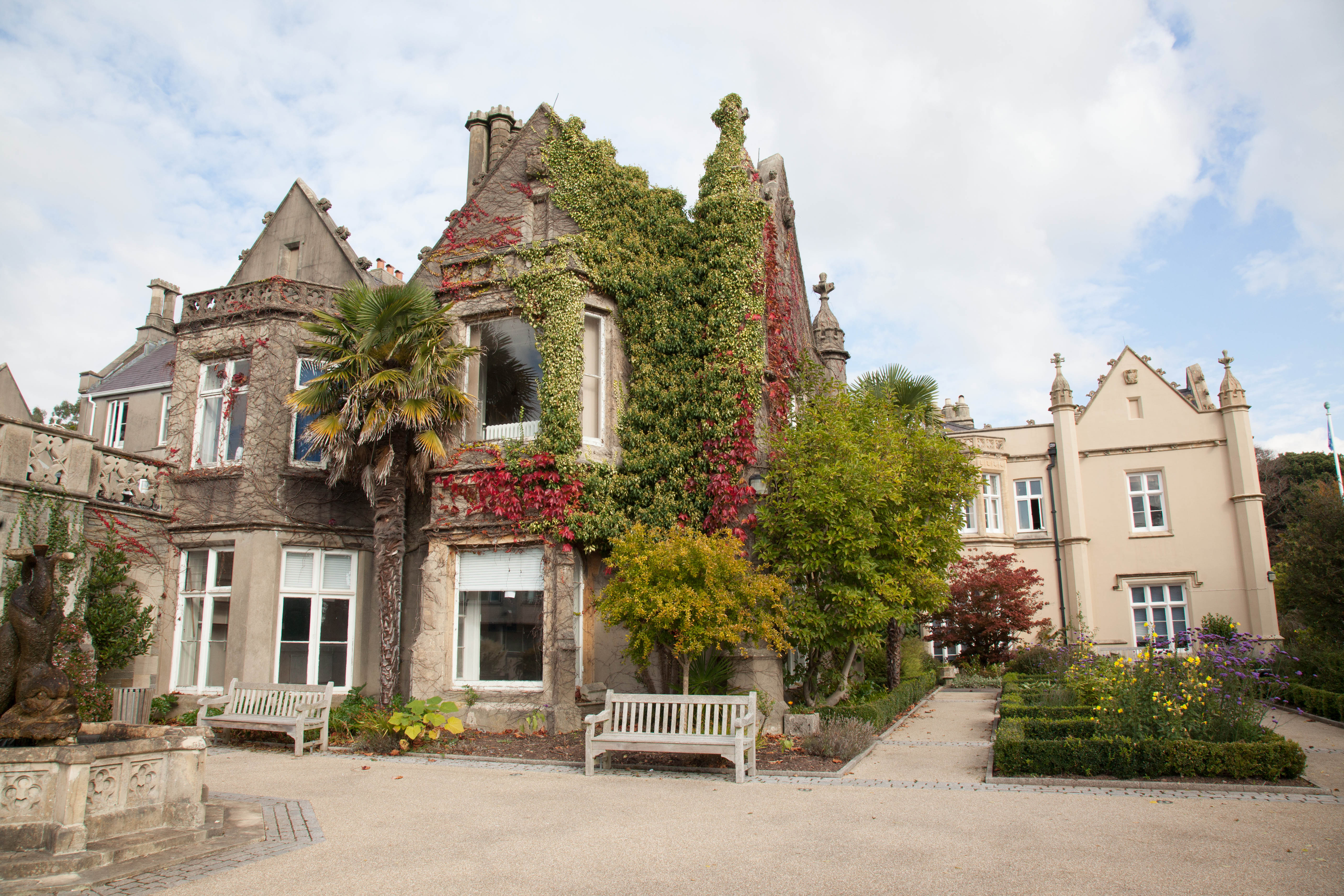
Singleton Abbey in October 2015

The house survives, with limited losses, much as it appears in the engraved plates of the book. The back stairs, on the axis of the south front, and the ground-floor room in the centre of the south front, with a bowed inner end, survive from the original house of 1784.

In 1919 the 2nd Lord Swansea sold Singleton Abbey to Swansea Corporation. In 1920 the Corporation rented and in 1923 sold the house and the nucleus of the estate to the University College of Swansea, which made the Abbey its headquarters.

== Reading ==
- Newman, John; Hughes, Stephen; Ward, Anthony (2004). Glamorgan. New Haven and London: Yale University Press. ISBN 0-300-09629-1.
