= Trewan Hall =

Historic manor house in the parish of St Columb Major, Cornwall, England

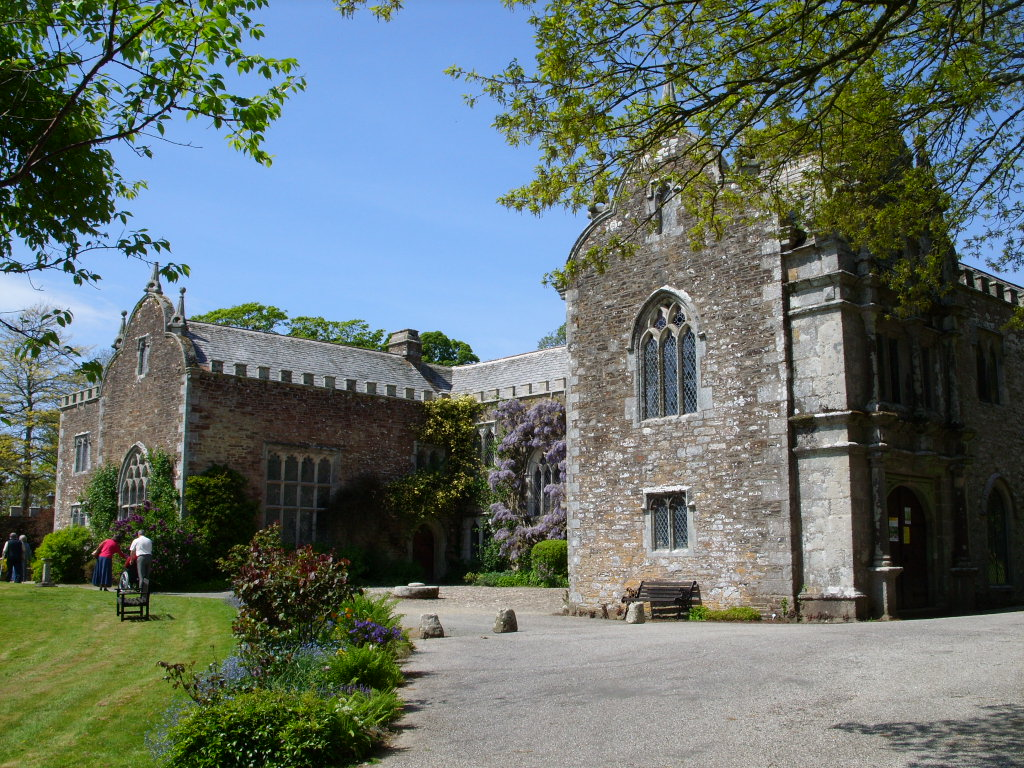

- Location within Cornwall
- 50.4447°N 4.9431°W
- Location: St Columb Major, Cornwall, England

Listed Building – Grade II*
- Official name: Trewan Hall with attached garden walls
- Designated: 7 January 1952
- Reference no.: 1144124

Trewan Hall (pronounced Trew-an) is a historic manor house in the parish of St Columb Major, Cornwall, England, UK. The surviving Jacobean style manor house is located one mile north of the town. It was the ancestral estate of the Vivian family (later Vyvyan, when a Vivian daughter married a distant cousin with varied spelling) for over 300 years, until it was sold in 1920.

The house and gardens, which now includes campsite grounds, has been privately owned by its current owners since 1960. Although the manor house is not generally open to the public, it holds annual open days as part of the National Gardens Scheme.

== The Manor House ==
The existing main house dates from circa 1633, and was built by the Vivian family as a replacement for the former manor house at Trenoweth (now Higher Trenoweth Farm), a short distance from Trewan. The building is a Grade II* Listed structure. Its origins are in the 15th century, but most of the fabric dates from 1635 onwards (a fireplace is inscribed with this year). Further alterations were executed in the late 19th century including a number of Gothic Revival windows added in the perpendicular style.

== The Campsite ==
The Campsite was founded in 1963 by Dennis and Phyllis Hill who purchased the estate in 1961. The campsite is still ran by the family and has developed to cater for 170 pitches spread over 36 acres of woodlands and fields. All developments have been made to be sympathetic with the historical buildings and grounds of the estate. The site includes a 25m heated swimming pool, several blocks of facilities, a playpark, a camp shop, and other amenities. In high season the barns open to local entertainment and there are various food options through the week. The site is open from mid May and mid September.

== The Vivian family ==
Several generations of the Vivian family lived in nearby Trenoweth before the manor house was built in Trewan circa 1633. In 1697, only-child Mary Vivian, of Trewan Hall, St Columb Major, married her distant cousin Sir Richard Vyvyan, 3rd Baronet of Colan, Cornwall. This united two branches of the family which had been separated for three centuries, and continued the family line under the spelling Vyvyan.

Through the centuries, some members of the Vivian family have served in official capacities. At least two members served as Sheriff of Cornwall: John Vivian from 1680 to 1681 and Thomas Vyvyan in 1779. Vivian family Members of Parliament include: Thomas Vivian (1617–1691), Francis Vivian (1649–1690), and John Vivian (1647–1691).

=== Vivians of Trenoweth and Trewan ===
Source:

=== John Vivian (I) ===
He was the brother of Prior Vivian of Bodmin

=== John Vivian (II) ===
Purchased Trenoweth manor from the Denzell family. He married Alice Tresaster.

=== Thomas Vivian (1547–1617) ===
Lived at Trenoweth at the time John Norden wrote his 'Survey of Cornwall'. He was married to Anne Lower. He was buried in the North isle of St Columb Church, where there is a mural tablet in memory of Thomas Vivian and Ann, for forty years his wife. He died 18 May 1616. She died 25 March 1635.

=== John Vivian (III) (1583–1647) ===
Moved the family seat from the Trenworth manor house to the Trewan manor house. He firstly married Frances Buller, daughter of Francis Buller of Tregarrick in Pelynt. He married secondly Mary Cavell, the daughter of William Cavell of St Kew. They had 10 sons.

- John (below)
- Thomas Vivian of St Martin's in the Fields, Middlesex. He married Ann Povey dau of Justinian Povey, widow of William Blathwaite of Detham. Ancestor of the Vivian & Sons of Swansea and Hussey Vivian, 1st Baron Vivian

=== John Vivian (IV) ===
He married three times; firstly Anne, daughter of Sir John Trelawny; she died 17 March 1638, and there is a memorial to her in St Columb's church. Next, he married Mary, daughter of Sir John Glanville of Kilsworthy in Devon; they had four children, Thomas, John, Francis, Anne and Jane.

Finally, he married Amy Speccott (1629–1686), widow of Anthony Nicholl (1611–1658), MP for Cornwall, 1654 to 1658, and Sheriff of Cornwall.

John served as Sheriff of Cornwall from 1667 to 1668, and he was also a magistrate in Cornwall.

=== Thomas Vivian ===
He was the eldest son of the above married Frances Blaythwayte of Dyrham Park in the County of Gloucester. Her brother was William Blathwayt, Secretary of War to James II of England and William III of England. Frances died 1707 and her memorial is in St Columb church. He married secondly Sarah Dodson, but no issue. His heir was his brother John Vivian (below).

=== John Vivian (V) (1647–1691) ===
Son of John and Mary, above. John was a Barrister in Law, married Ann, daughter of Matthew Hals of Efford near Plymouth, by whom he no issue. He married secondly Mary, Daughter of Joseph Sawle of Penrice, by whom he had 3 children; John, Thomas and Mary. He was set upon and killed after 'speaking somewhat in favour of the tinners' outside the houses of Parliament.

=== Francis Vivian (1649–1690) ===
Son of John above. A captain in the Army and third son of John Vivian (IV) above. He married Ann, daughter of Henry Maynard of Milton, Devon, Gent and sole heiress to her mother Bridget, the only surviving daughter of Sir Samuel Coswarth, by whom she had only one daughter Mary. In 1689 he was member of parliament for Mitchell, Cornwall.

=== Mary Vyvyan (née Vivian) ===
An only-child, she inherited all her paternal Vivian estates and maternal Coswarth and Myners estates. She married her distant cousin, Sir Richard Vyvyan, 3rd Baronet and heir of the Vyvyan family's Trelowarren Estate, bringing the Vyvyan spelling to the Trewan Hall line. Mary and Richard were imprisoned in the Tower of London for some time for supporting James Francis Edward, Prince of Wales' claim to the throne, participating in the unsuccessful Jacobite uprising in Cornwall of 1715. While there, Mary gave birth to daughter Anne.

They had 6 sons.

- Francis, succeeded his father as 4th Baronet and inherited the Trelowarren Estate
- Richard Vyvyan was born 1701 and married Philippa Piper. They are the progenitors of the Vyvyans of Withiel, many of whom became rectors there.
- Charles
- Thomas (inherited the Trewan Hall Estate, see below)
- John
- James

Also 4 daughters;

- Loveday
- Bridget
- Anne (born in the Tower of London)
- Frances

=== Thomas Vyvyan (I) ===
4th son of Sir Richard Vyvyan and Mary Vivian, inherited Trewan. Married Loveday, daughter of Nicholas Bogan. They had three sons

- Thomas (below)
- Nicholas
- Robert

and three daughters

- Loveday
- Prudence
- Bridget

=== Thomas Vyvyan (II) ===
Was Sheriff of Cornwall in 1779. Lived at Trewan. he married a daughter of Peters, but no issue,. Left estate to nephew, Richard Vivian

=== Richard Vyvyan (I) ===
Nephew of Thomas above. He married Anne Downe, daughter of John Downe of Borough house. He was Vicar Lamerton.

=== Richard Vyvyan (II) ===
He married Jane Ballard. He was Lieutenant-Colonel. Married 2nd Margaret Anne, daughter of Hugh Edwards, He was Justice of the Peace (J.P.). He was Deputy Lieutenant. He lived at Trewan.

=== Richard Henry Stackhouse Vyvyan ===
Born on 3 December 1832, the son of Richard Vyvyan and Jane Ballard. He died at Little St James Street, St James's Square, London, on 20 October 1881 without issue. He was a Justice of the Peace and Deputy Lieutenant and his residence, Trewan, was left to his cousin the Rev. Sir Vyell Donnithorne Vyvyan of Trelowarren, 9th Baronet, along with adjacent farms and lands of about 1,800 acres (730 ha).

=== Sir Vyell Donnithorne Vyvyan ===
Son of Rev Vyell Francis Vyvyan. Born 1826 and lived at Trewan. Matriculated from St John's College, Cambridge, 1845. He was Curate of Churchstoke, Montgomeryshire, 1854–1855. Rector of Winterborne Monkton, Dorset, 1855–1866. Vicar of Broad Hinton, Wilts, 1866–1877, and Withiel, Cornwall, 1877–1879. He married Louisa Bourchier of Brook Lodge, Dorset. On his death in 1917 his second son Richard, who was a major in the army, inherited Trewan.

=== Richard Walter Comyn Vyvyan ===
Richard Walter Comyn Vyvyan was born on 16 September 1859, at Monkton in Dorset. He was married Mary Foster, daughter of Edward Foster of Dowsby, Lincolnshire. He died on 10 September 1931 at age 71 and was buried at St Columb church. He was Justice of the Peace in Cornwall. He was Lieutenant-Colonel of 21st (Reserve) Battalion, Welsh Regiment, during World War I. Children of Richard Walter Comyn Vyvyan and Mary Foster were as follows:

- Walter Drummond Vyvyan b. 20 Mar 1887. He was killed in World War I.
- Muriel Alice Vyvyan b. 1890, d. 1891
- Sir Richard Philip Vyvyan, 11th Bart. b. 21 Nov 1891, d. 15 May 1978

In 1920 Major Richard Vyvyan sold Trewan to a Mr. Hawkey and this was the end of its connection with the Vyvyan family of nearly three hundred years.

== See also ==
The following were junior branches of the Vivian family of Trenowth and Trewan:

- Baron Vivian
- Baron Swansea
