= Peter Frederick Robinson =

English architect

Peter Frederick Robinson (1776–24 June 1858) was an English architect.

== Career ==
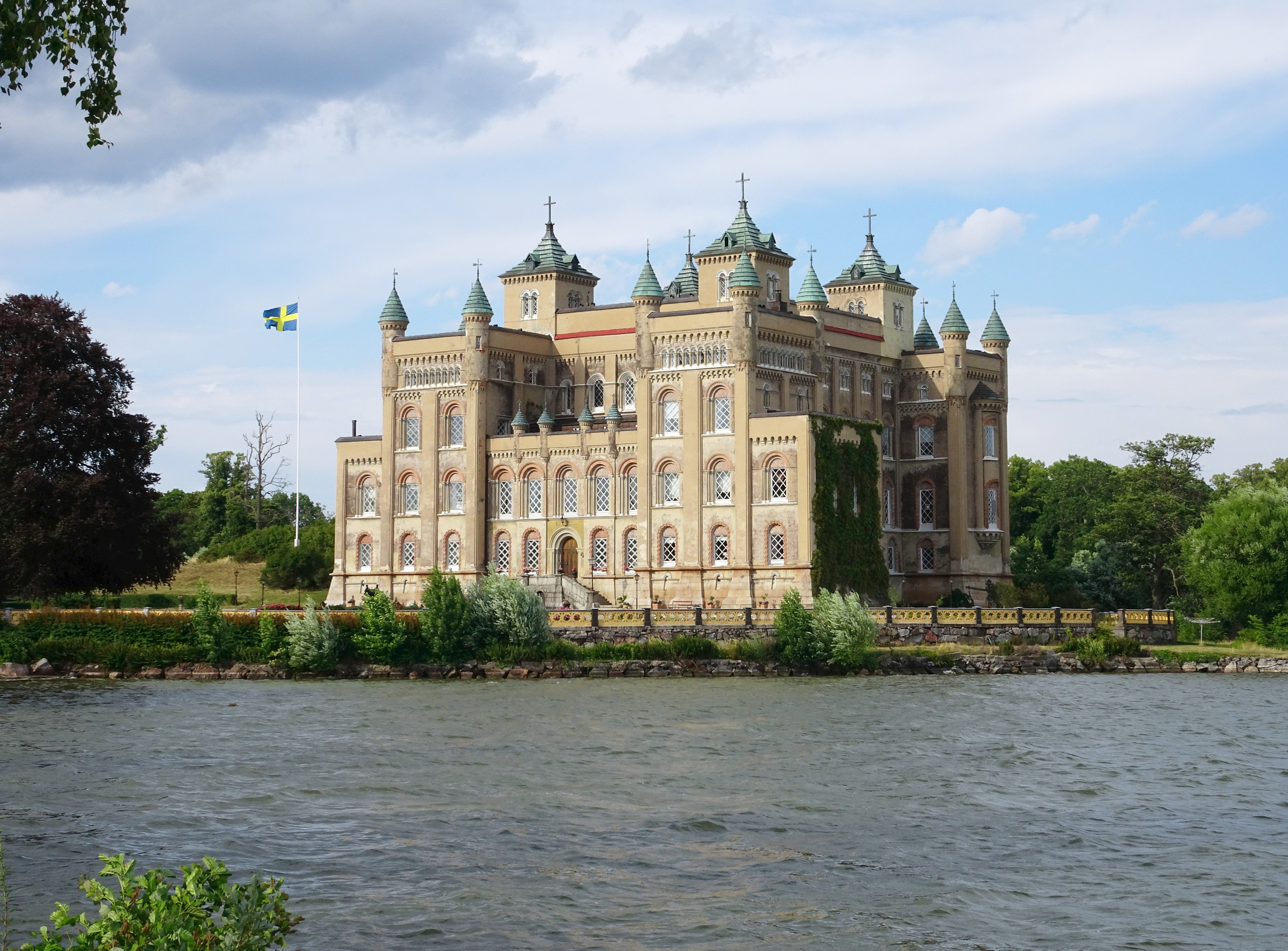
Stora Sundby Castle, Sweden, 1831-1848.

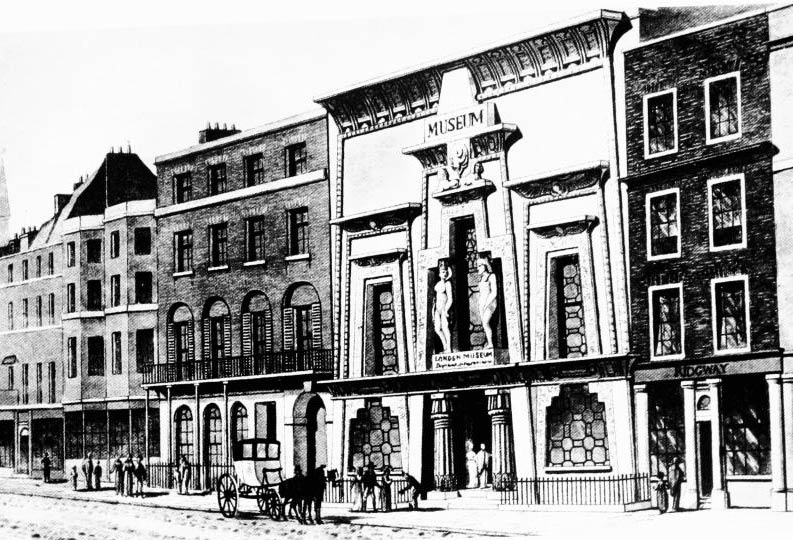
The facade of the Egyptian Hall in 1815.

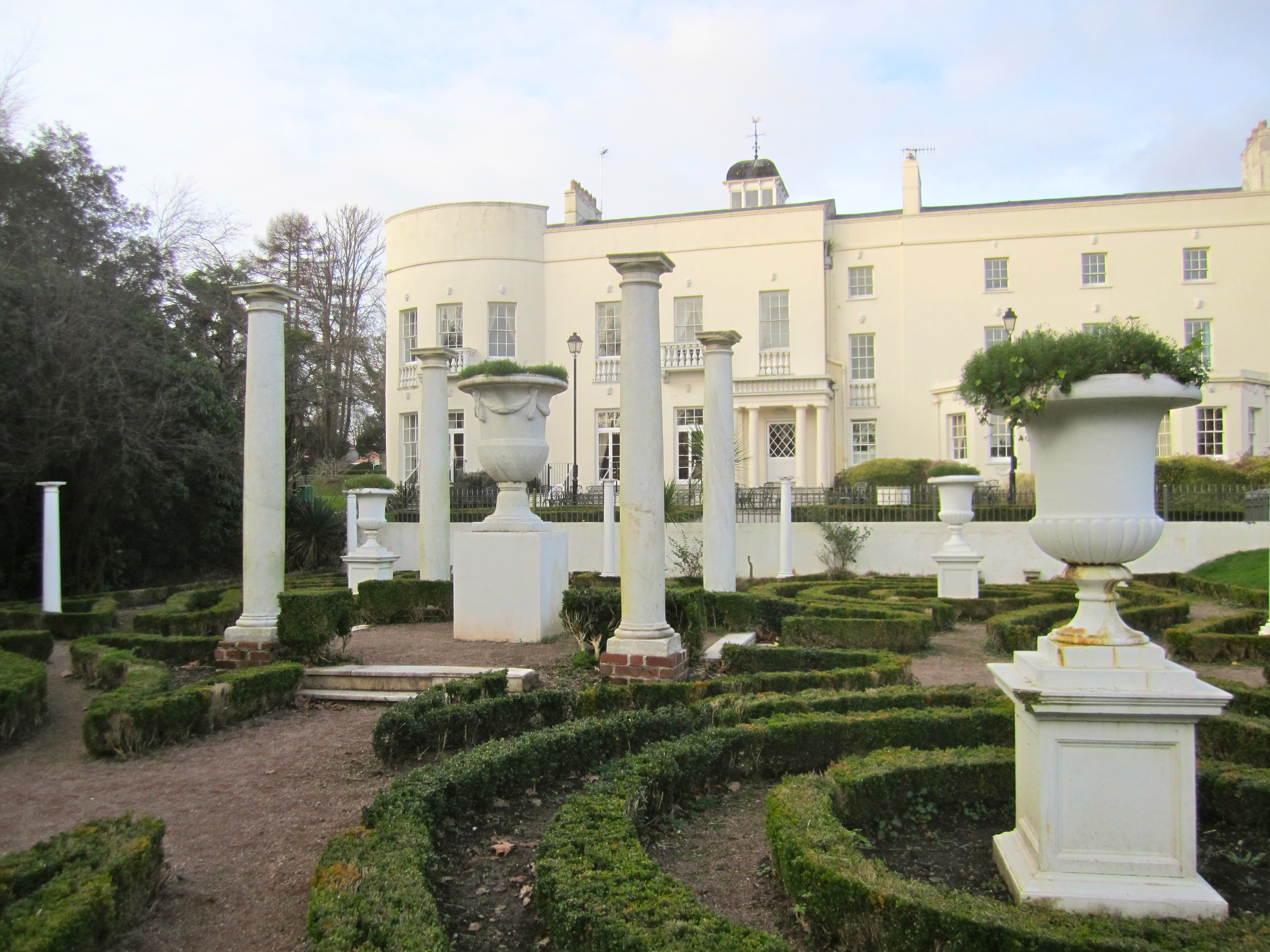
Sketty Hall.

Robinson began his career in Henry Holland's office and worked under William Porden at the Brighton Pavilion in 1801–02. In 1805 he designed Hans Town Assembly Rooms, Cadogan Place, and in 1811–12 the Egyptian Hall, Piccadilly, for William Bullock's museum. The details of the elevation were taken from Denon's work on the Egyptian monuments, and especially from the temple at Denderah; but the composition of the design was less authentic. In 1813 he designed the town-hall and market-place at Lampeter, Cardiganshire. He visited Rome 1816. In 1819 he made alterations at Bulstrode for the Duke of Somerset; in 1823 he restored the church at Mickleham, Surrey; in 1826–28 he made alterations to the prison at York Castle and in 1829–32 he built a Swiss Cottage at Decimus Burton's Colosseum in Regent's Park. He also designed various country houses.

In 1820 he exhibited an architectural drawing at the Royal Academy's RA 52nd exhibition: Additions to be made to Norbury Park House, Surrey. In 1836 he submitted designs to the competition for the new Houses of Parliament.

He published a number of books of designs, including Designs for Farm Buildings : with a view to prove that the simplest forms may be rendered pleasing and ornamental by a proper disposition of the rudest materials, Designs for Gate Cottages, Lodges, and Park Entrances, in various styles, from the humblest to the castellated, Designs for Ornamental Villas and Domestic Architecture in the Tudor Style. He also published five parts of a continuation of Vitruvius Britannicus (begun by Colin Campbell and continued by George Richardson), covering Woburn Abbey (1827), Hatfield House (1833), Hardwicke Hall (1835), Castle Ashby (1841) and Warwick Castle (1842).

Robinson became a Fellow of the Society of Arts in 1826, and was a vice-president of the Institute of British Architects (now RIBA) in 1835–9.

In about 1840 financial difficulties caused him to leave England for Boulogne, where he died on 24 June 1858.

== Personal ==
Between at least 1821 and 1837, he lived at 29 Lower Brook Street, Grosvenor Square, London. He married Julia Ponsonby, daughter of Rev Mr Wall, at St George's Hanover Square on 5 May 1828. Sons were born in October 1830 and December 1831.

== Works ==
- Hans Town Assembly Rooms, Cadogan Place, London (1805)
- Egyptian Hall, Piccadilly, London (1811–1812)
- Sketty Hall
- The Swiss cottage in Singleton Park, Swansea
- Singleton Abbey
- Swiss Cottage, at the Colosseum in Regent's Park (1829–1832)
- Stora Sundby Castle, Sweden, (1831-1848)
- De Grey House, York, England (1835)
- Park Terrace, Nottingham

== Sources ==
This article incorporates text from a publication now in the public domain: Dodgson, Campbell (1897). "Robinson, Peter Frederick" . In Lee, Sidney (ed.). Dictionary of National Biography. Vol. 49. London: Smith, Elder & Co.
