= Singleton Park =

Park in Swansea, Wales

- Parc Singleton
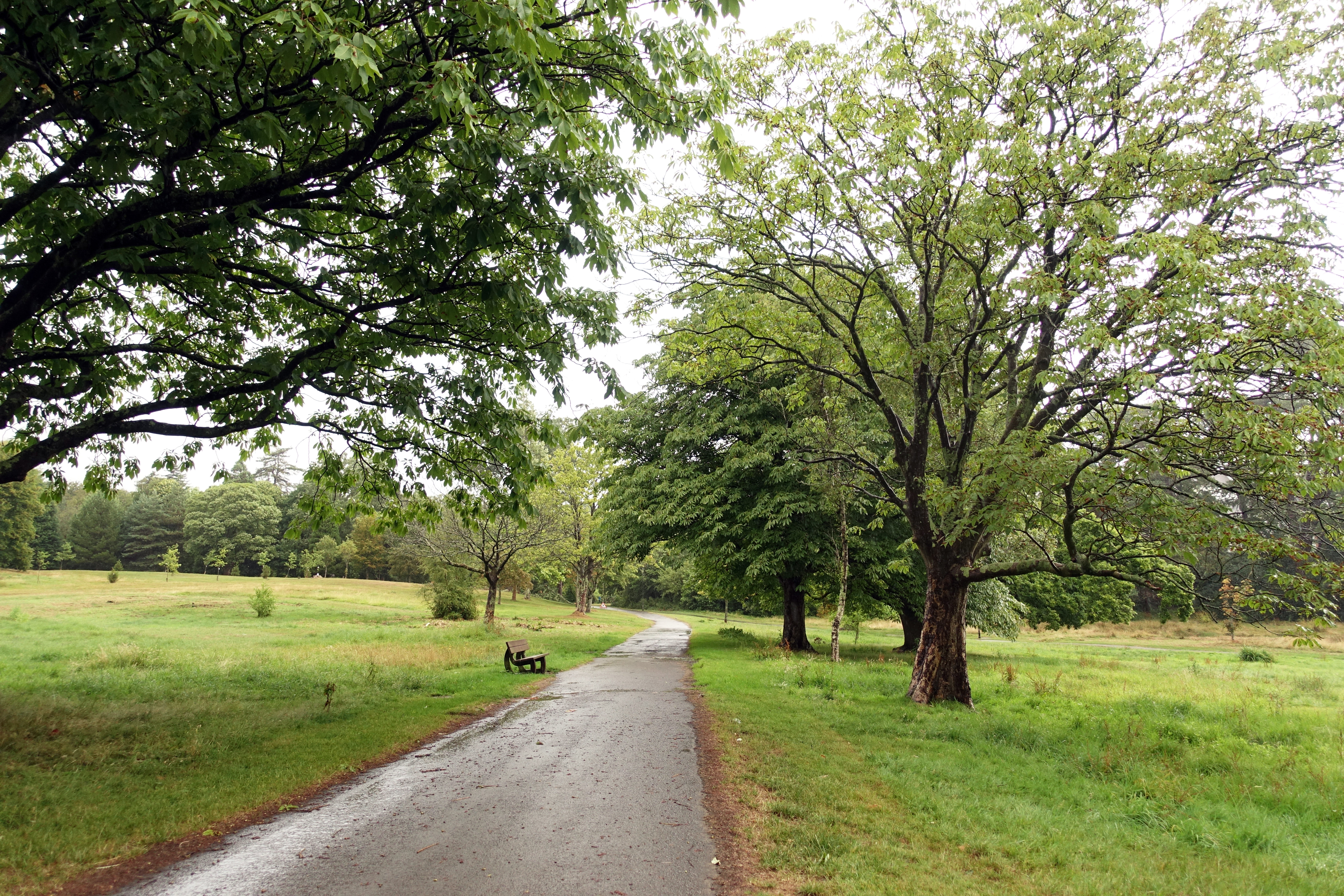
- Location: Swansea
- Coordinates: 51.612815°N 3.980846°W
- Owned by: City and County of Swansea Council
- Open: 1919
- Status: Grade I
- Website: https://www.swansea.gov.uk/singletonpark

Singleton Park (Welsh: Parc Singleton) is the largest urban park in the city of Swansea. It is located in Sketty and is listed on the Cadw/ICOMOS Register of Parks and Gardens of Special Historic Interest in Wales.

The park encompasses 250 acres. An ornamental garden is located in the south, near the entrance to Swansea University, while a walled botanical garden is located in the park centre. On the south-western corner, past the hospital and the university, is a boating lake, as well as a miniature golf course.

== History ==
The park was originally part of the Vivian family estate. It was purchased by Swansea County Borough Council in 1919 for use as a public park. Park superintendent Daniel Bliss, who was trained at Kew Gardens, was conceived of the Singleton Farm botanical gardens and Ornamental Gardens. He was the main driver behind the purchase of the estate.

During the Second World War, the park hosted the Armaments Research Department a detachment of the Woolwich Arsenal under Sir Robert Robertson (1869-1949). While in 1944 over 1500 American soldiers were billeted for training on the beaches prior to landing on Omaha Beach, Normandy.

A Gorsedd stone circle was erected in 1925 for the Eisteddfod held in Singleton Park, Swansea, and was enlarged in 1964.

The park hosts, and has hosted, entertainment and cultural events such as The Wave's Party in the Park and Escape into the Park. Music events held by other local commercial radio stations and their partners in the Swansea area include the former Stars in the Park. The BBC hosted Proms on the Park and the Biggest Weekend. Artists who have performed in the park include Jess Glynne and the Stereophonics.

== Gardens ==
Singleton Park has several formal gardens in addition to the Botanical Garden, there is an Italianate Garden and ornamental garden.

=== Botanical Gardens ===
Originally called the Educational Gardens the botanical gardens were opened on 25th May 1926 housing a collection of economic plants and British flora. During the second world war part of the gardens were used for growing vegetables as part of the Dig for Victory campaign.

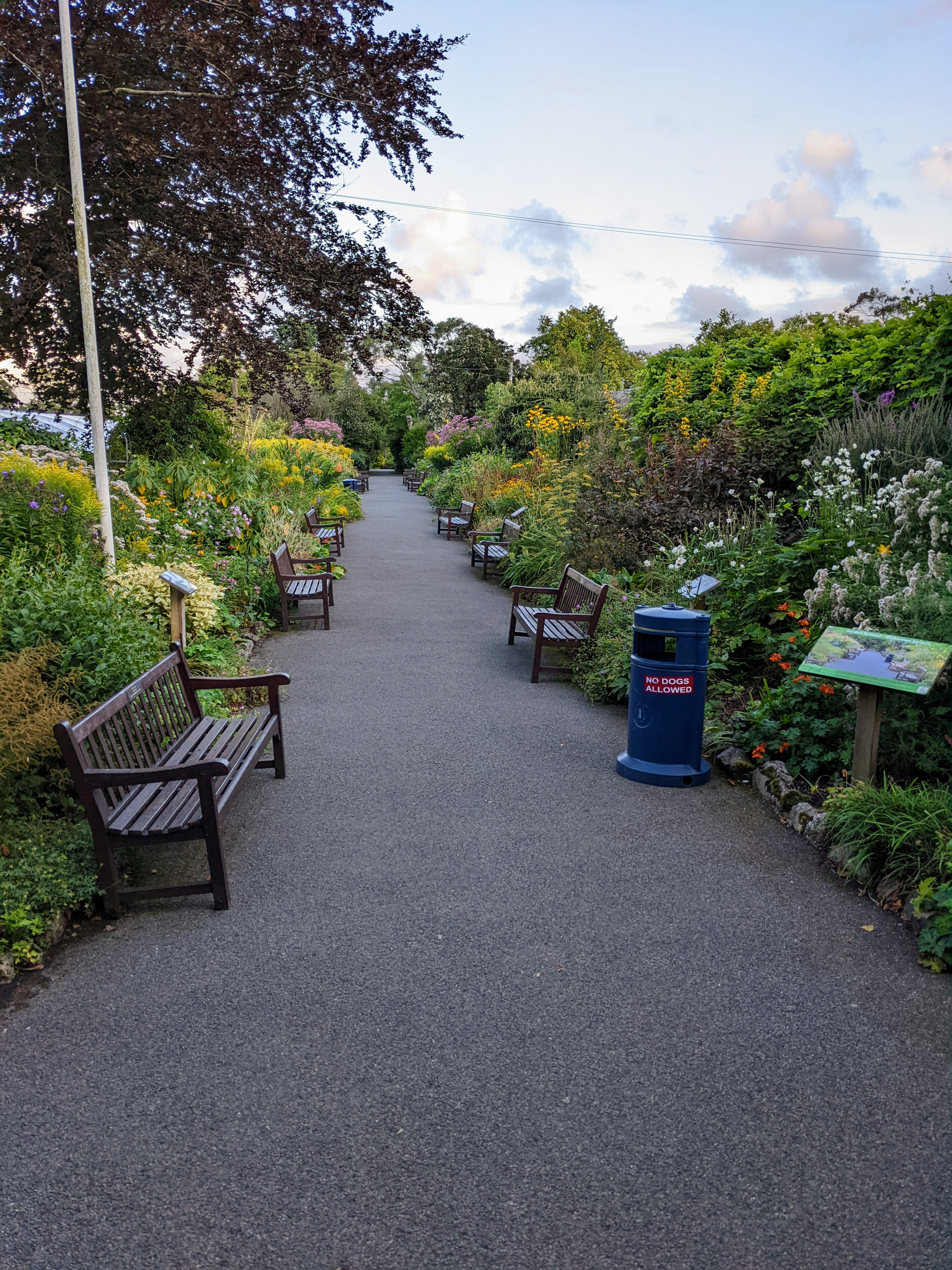
The Botanical Garden in Singleton Park

The original wooden glasshouses were replaced in 1987 as they had become unsafe, and replaced by aluminium structures. Ty Blodau (English: Flower House) is a purpose-built education and visitors center opened in 2006, funded by the Friends of the City of Swansea Botanical Complex.

A Wildflower/Wellbeing Garden was created as an extension to the botanical gardens in 2017, creating a little slice of wild among the more formal settings of the traditional garden.

The Friends of the City of Swansea Botanical Complex commissioned the creation of a bi-lingual commemorative panel to celebrate the Centenary of Singleton Park being in public ownership. The panel will be displayed in the Botanical Gardens. This panel was unveiled by descendants of the Vivian family on Sunday 4 August 2019. In 2022 the park, including the former gardens of Sketty Hall, was listed at Grade I on the Cadw/ICOMOS Register of Parks and Gardens of Special Historic Interest in Wales.

== Structures ==
=== Buildings ===
A Swiss cottage is located inside the park. It was designed by architect P.F. Robinson, who designed Sketty Hall as well as other lodges in the park. The cottage was badly damaged in 2010 in an arson attack, but was restored. The lakeside pub, Inn on the Lake, became so well known as The Pub On the Pond that the owner later gave in and changed the name.

Building and structure	Architect	Year	Image
Bishop Gore School		1952	Bishop Gore school main entrance
Mosque			
Union House			
Institute of Life Science 1 and 2		2007 and 2009	Institute of Life Science 2
Digital Technium		2005	
Talbot Building			
Faraday Building			
Glyndwr Building		c. 1960s	
Vivian Tower		c. 1960s	
Kier Hardie Building			
Callaghan Building			
Wallace Building	Percy Thomas Partnership	1956	
Grove Building		1961	Grove Building Swansea University
Fulton House, Swansea (originally College House)	Norman Thomas	1961	
1937 Library	Verner O. Rees	1937	
Library and Information Building	Sir Percy Thomas & Son	1963	
Singleton Abbey			Singleton Abbey
Singleton Home Farm			
Singleton Hospital			Singleton Hospital Viewed from across public and University playing fields
Sketty Hall		1852	Sketty Hall
Taliesin Arts Center	The Peter Moro Partnership	1984	
The Swiss Cottage	P.F. Robinson (1776-1858)	1826	Swiss cottage in Singleton, UK
Veranda House	Henry Woodyer	1852	

=== Gate Houses ===
Building and structure	Architect	Year	Image
Gower Lodge(also known as Veranda Lodge or North Lodge)	possibly Haycock	mid-1800s	Gower Lodge Singleton Park
Brynmill Lodge	Henry Woodyer	1854	Brynmill Lodge Singleton Park
Sketty Green Lodge (also known as Sketty Lane Lodge)	P.F. Robinson (1776-1858)		
Ty Harry	P.F. Robinson (1776-1858)		

== See also ==
- List of gardens in Wales
