= Clyne Gardens =

Botanical garden in Swansea, Wales

Coordinates: 51.5959°N 4.0032°W

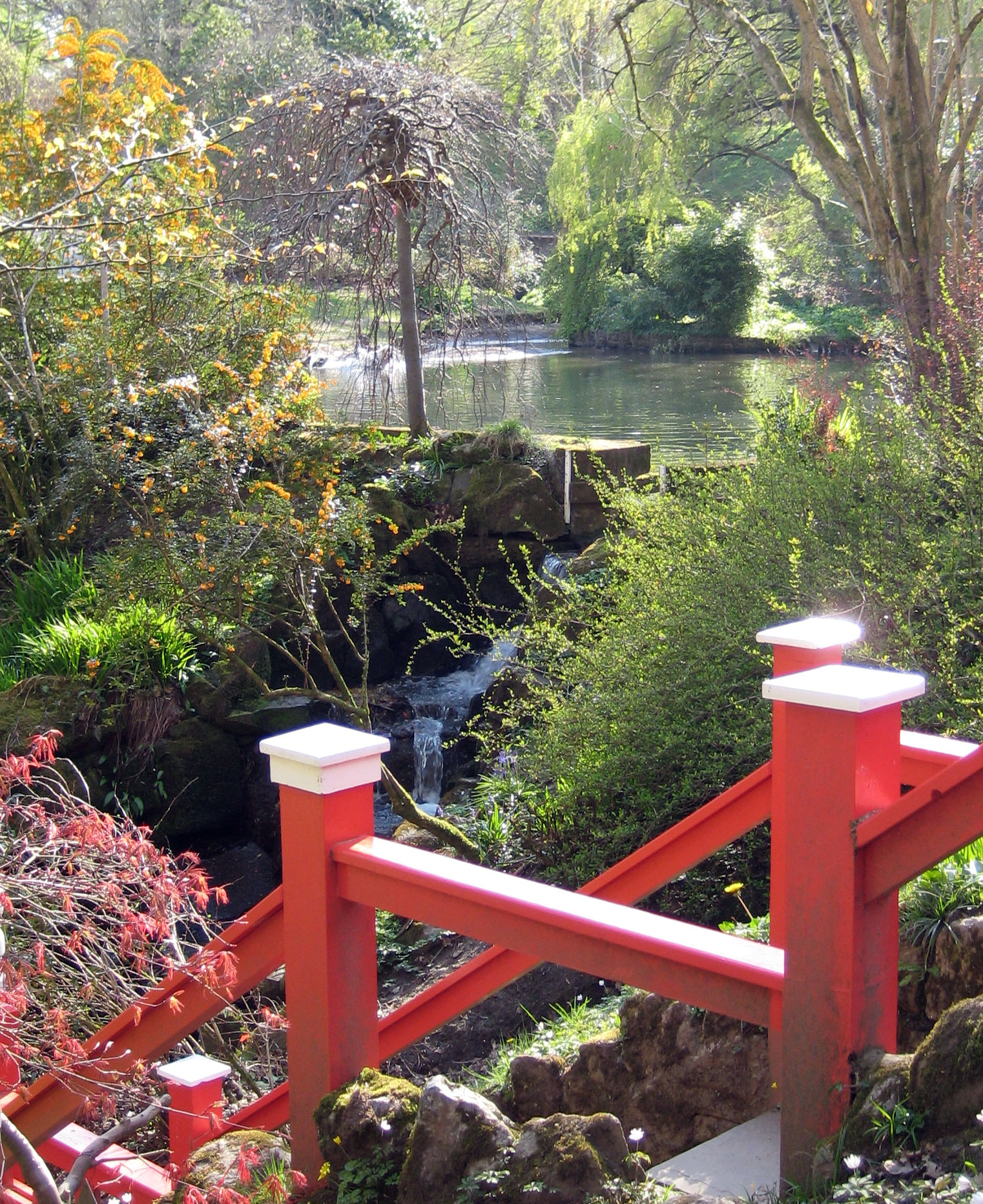
The Japanese Pond in early spring

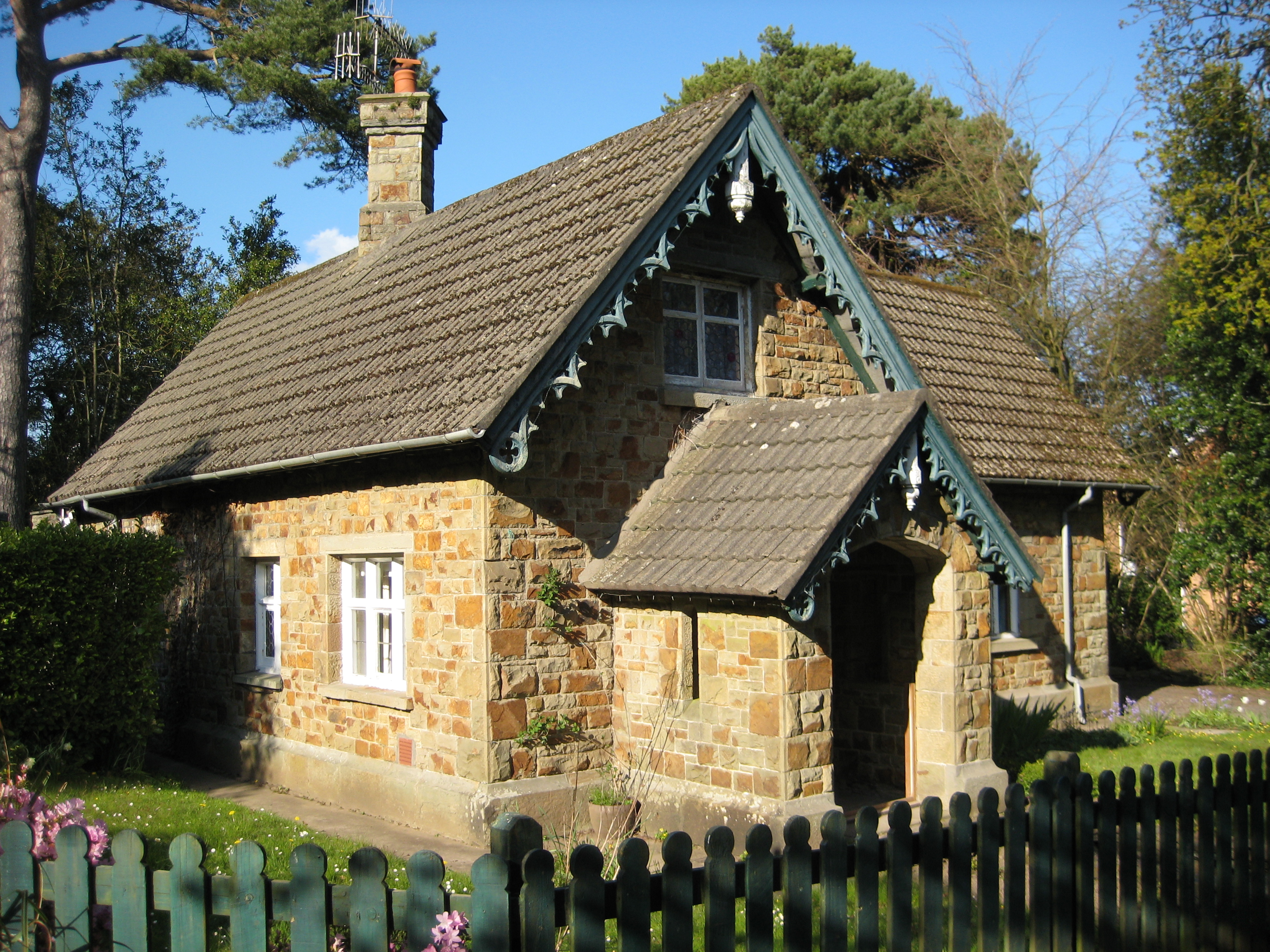
The lodge at the south entrance to Clyne Gardens

Clyne Gardens is a botanical garden in Swansea, Wales, UK. The current park was formed from the landscaped gardens created by Glynn Vivian of the Vivian family who purchased Clyne Castle in 1860. The estate passed in 1921 to his nephew Algernon, 'The Admiral', who owned it until his death in 1952. Clyne Gardens is bordered by Mumbles Road and Mayals Road in the Blackpill and Mayals areas of Swansea, west of the city, and has entrances off both these roads. The gardens are listed on the Cadw/ICOMOS Register of Parks and Gardens of Special Historic Interest in Wales.

== Attractions ==
The gardens consist of 19 hectares of land and have over 2,000 plants, including over 800 rhododendrons for which the gardens are renowned. Clyne holds National Collections of Pieris, Enkianthus and rhododendrons. Due to the cool, wet and temperate local climate, many plants thrive here not normally considered hardy for its latitude. There are extensive bog gardens, home to "giant rhubarb" (Gunnera manicata) and American skunk cabbage.

The gazebo to the right of the castle was built by the Admiral to view the incoming ships as they entered Swansea Bay, and is surrounded by a stand of Monterey pine 'Pinus radiata'. These trees have retained their lower branches which filter the prevailing winds and give greater cover (protection) to the area. A Japanese garden at the top of the gardens has a red and white painted bridge, many bamboo plants and an artificial lake with a waterfall passing underneath the bridge. The water which rises in Clyne Common travels under the Japanese Bridge and through the gardens to join the sea at Blackpill. Alongside the bridge is a fine specimen of the handkerchief tree 'Davidia Involucrata var. vilmoriniana'.

The park is scattered with small dogs' graves to commemorate the Admiral's family pets. Joy Cottage at the seafront entrance was built as a miniature cottage for the relaxation and education of the Admiral's daughters by nannies employed to teach reading, writing and cookery. Clyne Chapel, built by William Graham Vivian, was opened for worship in 1908. Beneath it, in a private vault, Graham Vivian, his sister Dulcie and the Admiral are buried.

== Notable trees ==
The tallest recorded Magnolia in Britain 'Magnolia campbellii var. alba' can be found here. The Oak woodland is a remnant of Clyne Forest, an important Norman 11th century historical feature. Glynn Vivian planted three notable trees still alive in front of the castle: one Wellingtonia 'Sequoiadendron giganteum' and two Monterey cypress 'Cupressus macrocarpa', one a fastigiate form which is also one of the tallest recorded in Britain.

== See also ==
- List of gardens in Wales
