= Vivian baronets =

Set index for Shelley baronets

There have been two baronetcies created for members of the Vivian family, both in the Baronetage of the United Kingdom.

- Vivian baronets of Truro (1828): see Baron Vivian
- Vivian baronets of Singleton (1882): see Baron Swansea

== See also ==
- Vyvyan baronets
