= Clyne Castle =

Historic building in Swansea, Wales

Coordinates: 51°35′50.00″N 4°00′09.00″W

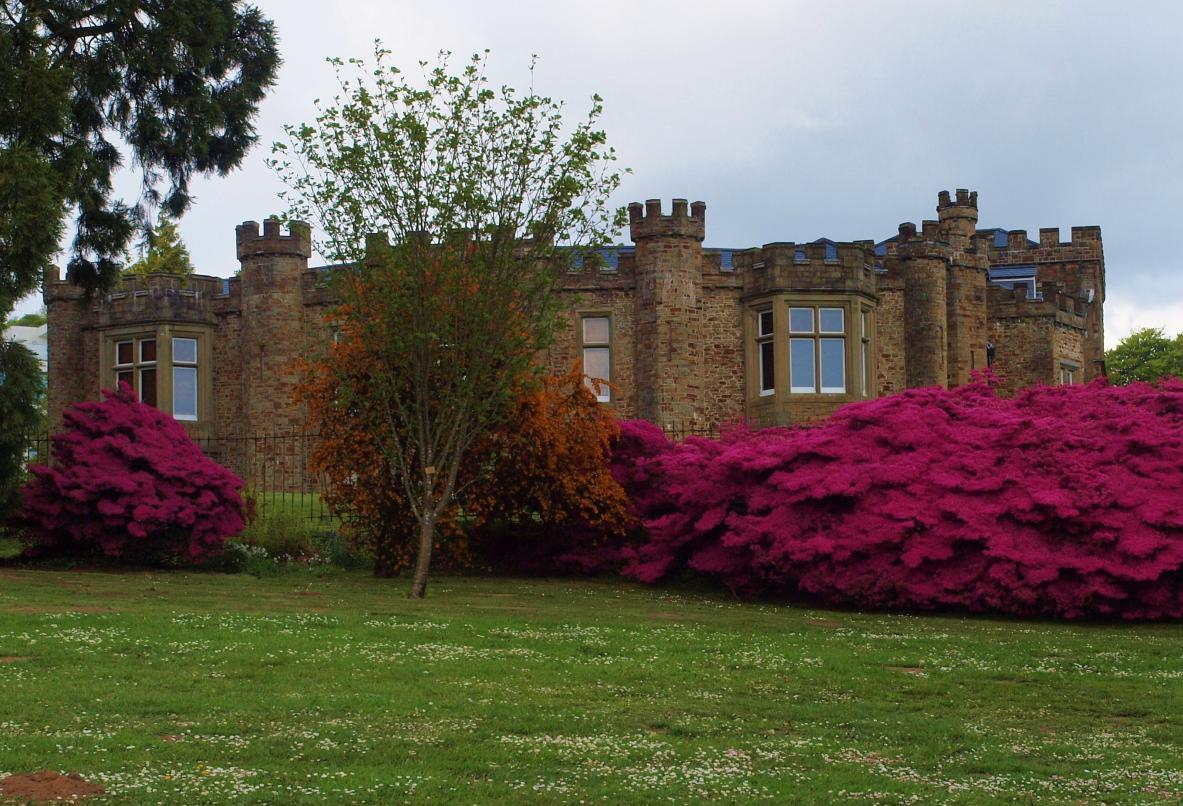
Clyne Castle

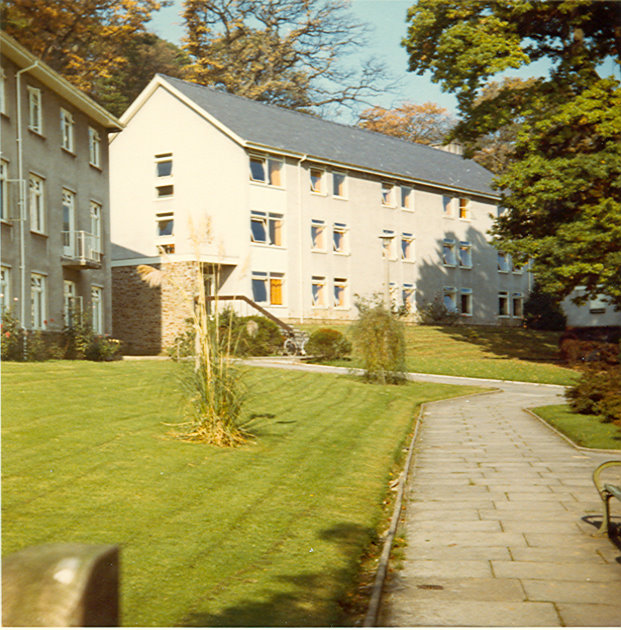
Clyne Castle men's hall blocks 1970

Clyne Castle is a Grade II*-listed building situated on a hill overlooking Swansea Bay, adjacent to the Clyne valley, near Blackpill, Swansea. Originally built in 1791 by a wealthy landowner it passed into the hands of the Vivian family and saw many distinguished guests over the years. Acquired by Swansea University in the 1950s, it was used as student accommodation. It has since become a block of apartments.

== History ==
Clyne Castle was originally built in 1791 by Richard Phillips, a wealthy Carmarthenshire landowner. The Castle was subsequently remodelled by later owners, and was for many years in the possession of the Vivian family. While they lived in the castle, the eminent guests that visited them are thought to include Queen Victoria, Winston Churchill and King Edward VIII. William Graham Vivian planted the landscaped gardens in the 1860s.

== Later uses ==
Swansea University used the Castle as a hall of residence (Neuadd Gilbertson) after it acquired the building in the 1950s. The University built two accommodation blocks, and, later, a women's hall (Neuadd Martin), with exceptionally fine sea views, on the hill behind the castle. The two halls, which were linked by external steps, shared some functions.

The City of Swansea acquired the mature park of the Castle, now called Clyne Gardens (Gerddi Clun), which has views over the bay. The historic landscape area of Clyne Castle is a Registered Historic Park.

In 2003, the university decided to sell the halls and to build more accommodation on the main university campus instead. The current use of the refurbished castle is as a block of one- and two-bedroom apartments. The grounds are protected by wrought iron gates and residents have use of the lawned gardens.

The student accommodation blocks and the women's hall were demolished and were replaced in 2006 by new housing.
