= Sketty Hall =

Welsh hall for functions

Coordinates: 51°36′47.00″N 3°59′18.00″W

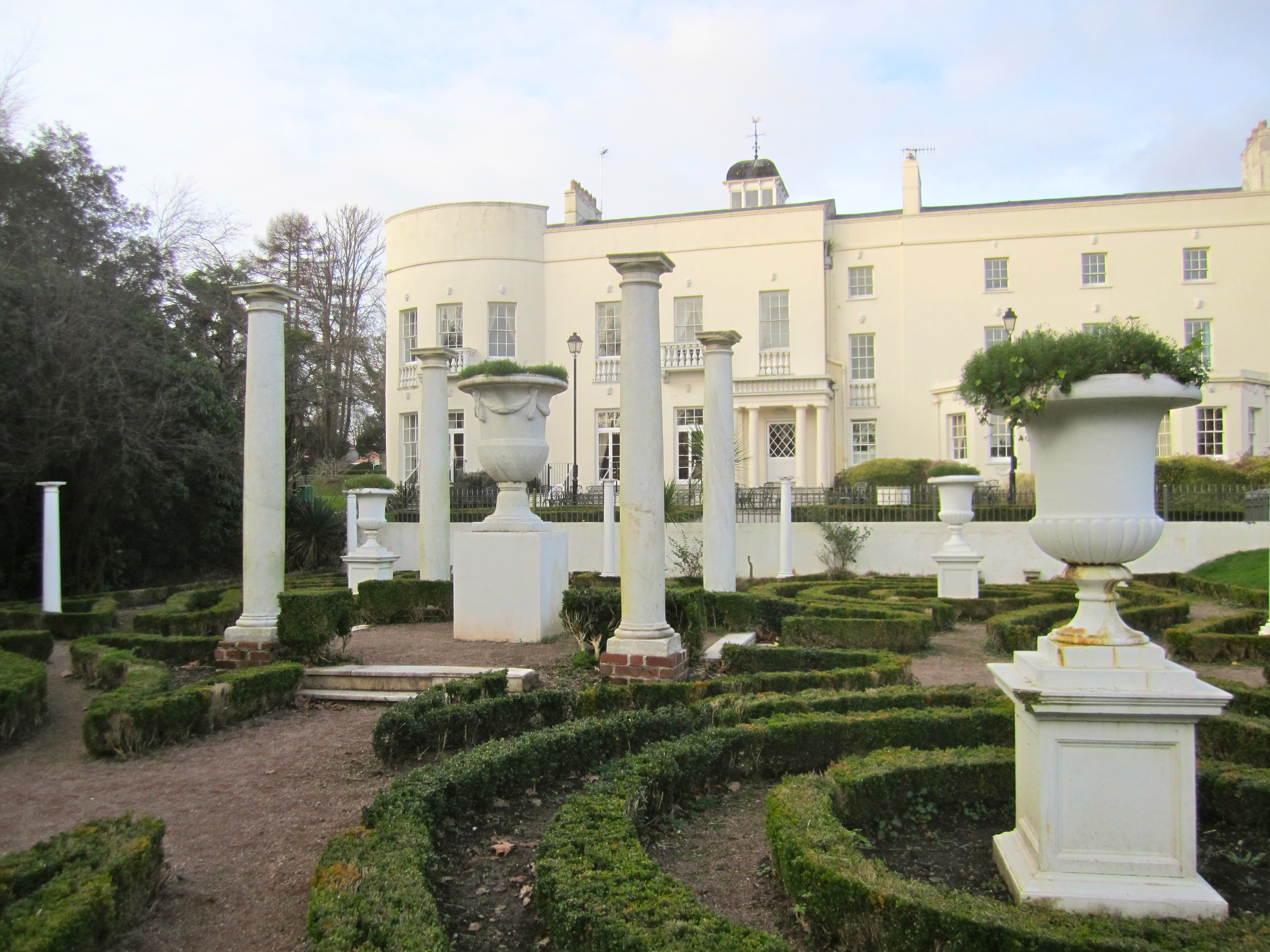
Sketty Hall with a belvedere on its roof, and a classical garden in the foreground

Sketty Hall is a venue used for hosting social functions, business functions and conferences in Singleton Park, Swansea, south Wales. The original building was built in the early 18th century as a private house. Over the years it has seen a number of extensions, modifications and changes of use to its present-day role.

== History ==
The original building was constructed in the 1720s by Rawleigh Dawkin (later Rawleigh Mansel), son of the squire of Kilvrough in Gower, and on his death passed to his brother Mansel Dawkin (later Mansel Mansel). It was improved in 1780 by the addition of the bay windows and then Swansea architect, William Jernegan, later added the western part of the frontage for Ralph Sheldon, MP.

In the 1820s the house was remodelled by Charles Baring of the London merchant banking family. He added an extra floor to Rawleigh Dawkin's house and a parapet running the whole length of the south front. In 1831 the house was bought for £3,800 by Lewis Weston Dillwyn, owner of the Cambrian Pottery in Swansea. He commissioned the architect Edward Haycock Snr in the early 1830s to build the present entrance hall and adjacent large room on the north side of the house. In 1881 Frank Ash Yeo, Chairman of the Swansea Harbour Trust, added the dining room to the east of Dillwyn's entrance hall. Glynn Vivian, an art lover from the Vivian family who gave the Glynn Vivian Art Gallery to Swansea, bought the Hall in 1898 as his home. He added the balconies and masks of Italian marble, laid out the ornamental gardens and installed the belvedere or gazebo tower on the roof.

During the Second World War, the house was requisitioned to serve as an ARP area headquarters. Later it was used by the British Iron and Steel Research Association as a major research centre for the steel industry. The hall was completely renovated in 1993. In 2022, the gardens and grounds, which are incorporated into Singleton Park were listed at Grade I on the Cadw/ICOMOS Register of Parks and Gardens of Special Historic Interest in Wales.
