= Vivian & Sons =

Vivian & Sons was a British metallurgical and chemicals business based at Hafod, in the lower Swansea valley in Wales. The firm was founded in 1810, disappearing as a separate entity in 1924. Its chief outputs were ingot and sheet copper, with sulphuric acid and artificial manures as by-products.

About 1800, the Cornishman John Vivian (1750–1826), the first of the Vivian family to settle in Swansea, became managing partner in the copper works at Penclawdd and Loughor owned by the Cheadle Brasswire Company of Staffordshire. By 1806 his second son, John Henry Vivian, was made manager at Penclawdd. In 1808–1810, land at Hafod was leased from the Duke of Beaufort and the Earl of Jersey, by the new firm of Vivian & Sons. The partners were John Vivian and his two elder sons, John Henry Vivian and Richard Hussey Vivian. Richard was the older but was fully occupied in his military career; it was John Henry who became managing partner.

It was upon this site that the Hafod Smelting Works and Mills were established. Wood in his Rivers of Wales (1813) refers to the works "...lately built by Messrs. Vivian & Co., in the construction of which a laudable attention has been paid to the comfort and convenience of the workmen by a different arrangement of the furnaces".

By the 1840s, the Hafod Works were the largest of their kind in the world, and their output represented one-quarter of the entire copper trade of the United Kingdom. During the last decade of John Henry's life, 1845–1855, his eldest son, Henry Hussey Vivian, managed the works and took full control of the business on his father's death. In 1853, Vivian jointly acquired, with Williams, Foster & Co. of Morfa, the White Rock Copper Works at Foxhole, leased from the Earl of Jersey. In 1864, he began to obtain sulphuric acid from copper smoke, and in 1870-1871 he converted part of the White Rock works to treat poor silver-lead ores. White Rock ceased operations in 1928, the lease was surrendered and the works dismantled.

By the mid-1870s, the Vivian & Sons undertaking at Hafod consisted of six works: Hafod Alkali Works, Hafod Copper Mills, Hafod Copper Works, Hafod Iron Foundry, Hafod Phosphate Works, and Hafod Silver Works. The firm also owned brick works and the old Forest Spelter Works at Morriston; were colliery proprietors at Mynydd Newydd, Pentrefellen and Pentre; and had their own shipping offices at 6 Cambrian Place, Swansea.

In addition, H. H. Vivian personally owned the Hafod Isha Nickel and Cobalt Works. In 1883 he formed the associated company of H. H. Vivian & Co. Ltd. to take over that works, along with German silver and brass rolling mills at Birmingham and a nickel mine and smelting works at Senjen in Norway. Between 1889 and 1894 the company owned and worked the Murray Mine near Sudbury, Ontario, during the period when the rich Canadian ores were displacing the nickel ores of Norway from the world market.

By the mid-1880s, the quality of Cornish copper ore had decreased and it proved to be more economical to smelt ores at the mines in Chile and elsewhere. This situation led to the gradual cessation of copper smelting in the Swansea area. Other metalliferous industries took its place, as did a greater emphasis on engineering products. During the First World War, Vivians supplied the British Admiralty with brass tubes and condenser plates, more than doubling their output. The manufacture of shell driving bands was another notable contribution.

Vivian & Sons traded from 1810 until 1924, becoming a limited company in 1916. During 1924–1925, Vivians merged with two other Swansea firms – Williams, Foster and Company and Pascoe Grenfell and Sons (owned by Williams, Foster and Co. since 1897) – to form British Copper Manufacturers Ltd., which in 1928 was absorbed by Imperial Chemical Industries (ICI). The interests of the ICI Metals Division in the Lower Swansea Valley passed in 1957 to Yorkshire Imperial Metals, a joint enterprise with Yorkshire Copper Works Ltd. The combined Hafod and Morfa Works site continued rolling copper until its closure in 1980.

== Reading ==
- Morris, Bernard (1995). The Houses of Singleton. Swansea: West Glamorgan County Archive Service. ISBN 0-9521783-3-8.
- Newman, John; Hughes, Stephen; Ward, Anthony (2004). Glamorgan. New Haven and London: Yale University Press. ISBN 0-300-09629-1.
- Thomas, Norman Lewis (1966). The Story of Swansea's Districts and Villages. Neath: The Guardian Press (Neath) Ltd.
