= Arthur Vivian =

British politician (1834–1926)

Sir Arthur Pendarves Vivian KCB FRGS FGS
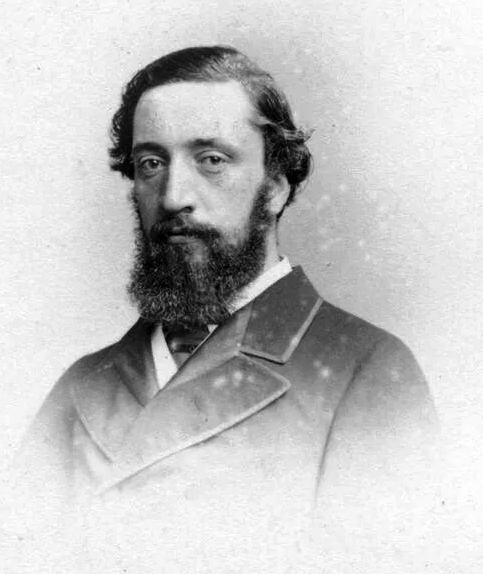
- By T R Williams, 1860s
- Born: 4 June 1834
- Died: 18 August 1926 (aged 92)
- Education: Eton College; Freiberg Mining Academy; Trinity College, Cambridge
- Occupations: Industrialist politician travel-writer
- Title: Knight Commander of the Order of the Bath (KCB) 1894
- Spouses: Lady Augusta Emily Wyndham-Quin (m. 1867; died 1877) Lady Jane Georgina Dalrymple (m. 1880; died 1914)
- Children: Children from both marriages
- Parent(s): John Henry Vivian (1785–1855); Sarah Jones ( –1886)

Sir Arthur Pendarves Vivian KCB FRGS FGS (4 June 1834 – 18 August 1926) was a British industrialist, mine-owner and Liberal politician from the Vivian family, who worked in South Wales and Cornwall, and sat in the House of Commons from 1868 to 1885.

== Early life and education ==
Vivian was the third son of the industrialist John Henry Vivian and his wife Sarah Jones, daughter of Arthur Jones, of Reigate. His elder brother was Henry Vivian, 1st Baron Swansea and his uncle was Hussey Vivian, 1st Baron Vivian. He was educated at Eton College, the Freiberg Mining Academy of Freiberg, Saxony and at Trinity College, Cambridge. He left college in 1855, on his father's death, to manage the family's copper smelting and rolling works and colliery at Port Talbot. His residences in Cornwall were at Glendorgal in the parish of St Columb Minor and Bosahan on The Lizard.

== Public and parliamentary service ==
Vivian was elected as one of two members of parliament for Cornwall West in 1868, a seat he held, as a Liberal, until 1885, when the constituency was divided under the Redistribution of Seats Act 1885.

Vivian was a Justice of the Peace (JP) and Deputy Lieutenant for Glamorgan and a JP and Deputy Warden of the Stannaries for Cornwall. In local politics, Vivian was a county councillor for Glamorgan from 1889 to 1898, and a county alderman for Cornwall from 1898 to 1926. He served as High Sheriff of Cornwall in 1889. He was lieutenant-colonel of the 1st Glamorgan Rifle Volunteers, and was appointed a Companion of the Order of the Bath (CB) in 1894.

He was Colonel commanding the South Wales Border Volunteer Infantry Brigade from 1895 to 1902, was appointed a Knight Commander of the Order of the Bath (KCB) in the 1902 Coronation Honours list published on 26 June 1902, and invested as such by King Edward VII at Buckingham Palace on 24 October 1902.

== Travels and travel-writing ==
He was a frequent traveller and a fellow of the Royal Geographical Society. He published Wanderings in the Western Land (1879), describing his travels in North America, starting 14 August 1877 in St Johns, Newfoundland.

In 1879, he was made a Fellow of the Geological Society of London. He was President of the Royal Geological Society of Cornwall for 1880–81.

== Family and personal life ==
Vivian married firstly, 3 March 1867, Lady Augusta Emily Wyndham-Quin, daughter of 3rd Earl of Dunraven. She died on 11 February 1877. He married secondly, 10 March 1880, Lady Jane Georgina Dalrymple, daughter of 10th Earl of Stair. There were children from both marriages. His second wife died on 8 June 1914.

Vivian sold his residence Glendorgal, near Newquay on 11 December 1882 and bought the Bosahan estate, near Helston in the same year, living there from 1885 until he died in 1926, aged 92.

Cornwall Record Office holds 203 items in a deposited collection of his papers (Reference PV). Further papers, mostly relating to his Welsh business affairs are held at the West Glamorgan Archive Service. A photographic likeness of him in the 1860s is held by the National Portrait Gallery and another, with two dogs, at Community Archives Wales.

== Sources ==
- Burke, Sir Bernard; Burke, Ashworth P. (1928). Burke's Peerage. London: Burke's Peerage Ltd.
- Liberalism in West Cornwall: The 1868 Election Papers of A Pendarves Vivian MP edited and introduced by Edwin Jaggard; Devon & Cornwall Record Society, New Series Volume 42, 2000 ISBN 0-901853-42-9

Parliament of the United Kingdom
Preceded by Richard Davey; Sir John St Aubyn	Member of Parliament for Cornwall West; 1868 – 1885; With: Sir John St Aubyn	Constituency abolished
