= Baron Vivian =

Barony in the Peerage of the United Kingdom

Baron Vivian, of Glynn and of Truro in the County of Cornwall, is a title in the Peerage of the United Kingdom and held by a branch of the Vivian family. It was created on 19 August 1841 for the soldier Sir Hussey Vivian, 1st Baronet. He had already been created a baronet, of Truro in the County of Cornwall, on 19 January 1828. His eldest legitimate son, the second Baron, represented Bodmin in the House of Commons and served as Lord Lieutenant of Cornwall. His son, the third Baron, served as British Ambassador to Italy from 1891 to 1893. The latter's great-grandson, the sixth Baron, was a soldier and a Conservative member of the House of Lords. Lord Vivian was one of the ninety elected hereditary peers that were allowed to remain in the House of Lords after the passing of the House of Lords Act 1999. As of 2014 the titles are held by his only son, the seventh Baron, who succeeded in 2004.

Sir Robert Vivian, illegitimate son of the first Baron, was also a prominent soldier. Another member of the Vivian family was Henry Vivian, 1st Baron Swansea. He was the nephew of the first Baron. Lord Swansea's younger brother was Sir Arthur Vivian.

The traditional residence of the Barons Vivian was Glynn House near Cardinham, Cornwall, purchased and first lived in by the 1st Baron Vivian.

A number of Vivian family graves with Celtic-style headstones can be found at the Parish Church of St Winnow.

== Vivian baronets (1828) ==
- (Richard) Hussey Vivian, 1st Baronet (1775–1842)

=== Baron Vivian (1841) ===
- (Richard) Hussey Vivian, 1st Baron Vivian (1775–1842)
- Charles Crespigny Vivian, 2nd Baron Vivian (1808–1886)
- Hussey Crespigny Vivian, 3rd Baron Vivian (1834–1893)
- George Crespigny Brabazon Vivian, 4th Baron Vivian (1878–1940)
- Anthony Crespigny Claude Vivian, 5th Baron Vivian (1906–1991)
- Nicholas Crespigny Lawrence Vivian, 6th Baron Vivian (1935–2004)
- Charles Crespigny Hussey Vivian, 7th Baron Vivian (born 1966)

The heir presumptive is the present holder's first cousin, Thomas Crespigny Brabazon Vivian (born 1971).
The heir presumptive's heir-in-line is the present holder's third cousin once removed, (Christopher) John Desmond Vivian (born 1956), a great-great-grandson of the 2nd Baron.
The title next falls to his son, Alastair Desmond Vivian (born 1991).

=== Title succession chart ===
Title succession chart, Barons Vivian

Hussey Vivian; 1st Baron Vivian; 1775–1842
Charles Vivian; 2nd Baron Vivian; 1808–1886
Hussey Vivian; 3rd Baron Vivian; 1834–1893	Hon. John Vivian; 1836–1874	Hon. Charles Vivian; 1847–1892	Hon. Claud Vivian; 1849–1902
George Vivian; 4th Baron Vivian; 1878–1940	Anthony Vivian; 1880–1937	Claud Vivian; 1882–1928	Cyril Vivian; 1885–1960	Eric Vivian; 1891–1961
Anthony Vivian; 5th Baron Vivian; 1906–1991	Lt Cdr. Hon. Douglas Vivian; 1915–1973	Claud Vivian; 1920–1944	Desmond Vivian; 1925–1974
Nicholas Vivian; 6th Baron Vivian; 1935–2004	Hon. Victor Vivian; 1940–2013	John Vivian born 1956
Charles Vivian; 7th Baron Vivian born 1966	Thomas Vivian born 1971	Alastair Vivian born 1991

=== Line of succession ===
Barons Vivian line of succession
- Richard Hussey Vivian, 1st Baron Vivian (1775–1842)
  - Charles Crespigny Vivian, 2nd Baron Vivian (1808–1886)
    - Hussey Crespigny Vivian, 3rd Baron Vivian (1834–1893)
      - George Crespigny Brabazon Vivian, 4th Baron Vivian (1878–1940)
        - Anthony Crespigny Claude Vivian, 5th Baron Vivian (1906–1991)
          - Nicholas Crespigny Laurance Vivian, 6th Baron Vivian (1935–2004)
            - Charles Crespigney Hussey Vivian, 7th Baron Vivian (born 1966)
          - Hon. Victor Anthony Ralph Brabazon Vivian (1940–2013)
            - (1) Thomas Crespigny Brabazon Vivian (born 1971)
    - Hon. Claud Hamilton Vivian (1849–1902)
      - Capt. Eric Paul Vivian (1891–1961)
        - Desmond Walter Paul Vivian (1925–1974)
          - (2) Christopher John Desmond Vivian (born 1956)
            - (3) Alastair Desmond Vivian (born 1991)
        - (4) Patrick Cyril Vivian (born 1929)
          - (5) Simon Paul Richard Vivian (born 1962)
            - (6) Charles Patrick Michael Vivian (born 1999)
            - (7) Edward Simon Paul Vivian (born 2001)
        - (8) Charles Eveyln Vivian (born 1937)
      - Robert Crespigny Gwynedd Vivian (1898–1984)
        - (9) Robin Audley Clinton Vivian (born 1936)
          - (10) Rupert James Vivian (born 1970)

== See also ==
- Vivian family
- Baron Swansea

== Notes ==
Baronetage of the United Kingdom
Preceded by Dalrymple-Horn- Elphinstone baronets	Vivian baronets of Truro; 19 January 1828	Succeeded by Taylor baronets
