= Hussey Vivian, 1st Baron Vivian =

British cavalry leader

Lieutenant-General The Right Honourable The Lord Vivian GCB GCH PC PC (Ire) FRS
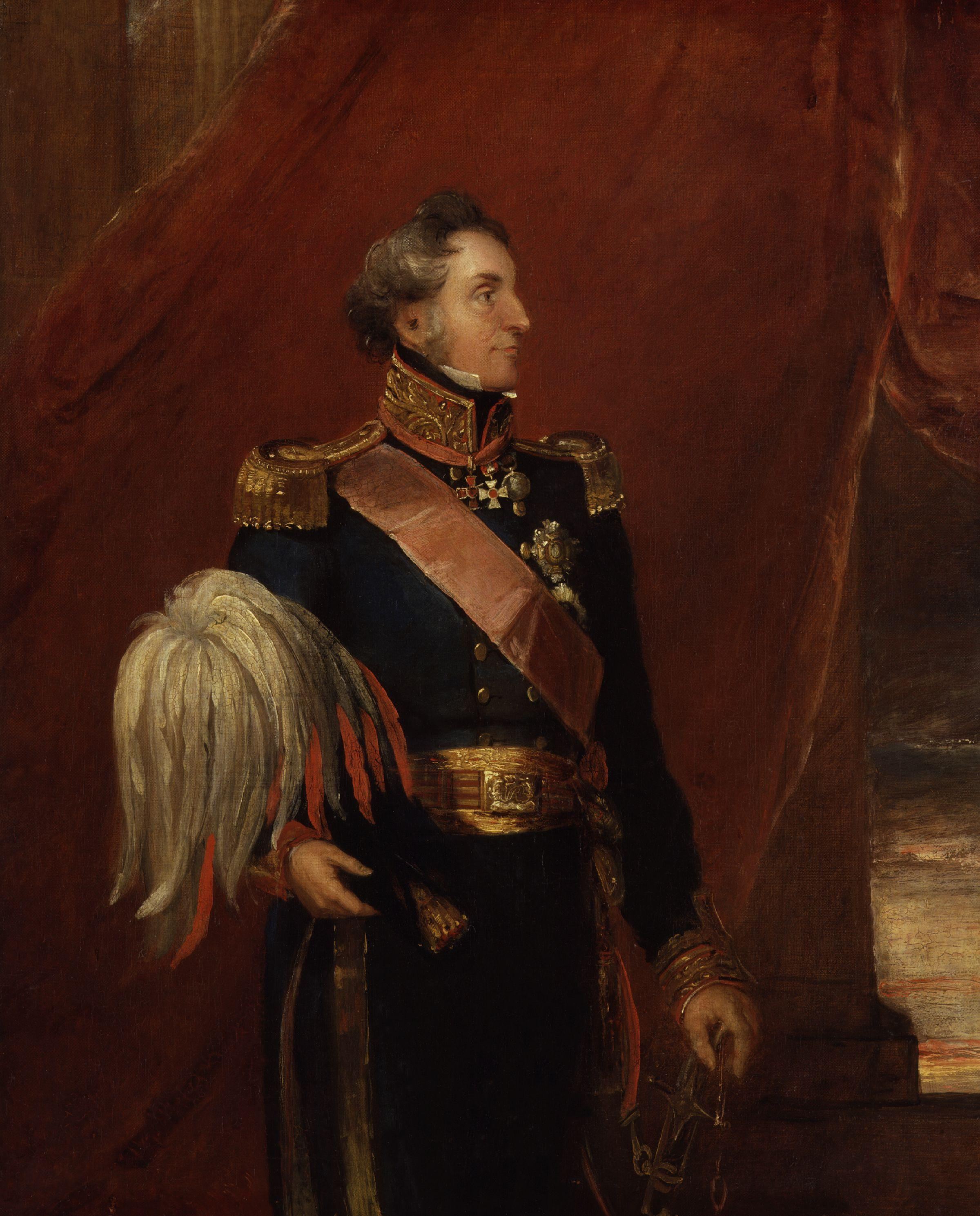
- Born: 28 July 1775
- Died: 20 August 1842 (aged 67); Baden-Baden
- Military career
- Allegiance: United Kingdom
- Branch: British Army
- Rank: Lieutenant-General
- Commands: 12th Royal Lancers; Ireland; Master-General of the Ordnance; 1st The Royal Dragoons
- Conflicts: French Revolutionary Wars; Napoleonic Wars; Peninsular War; Hundred Days
- Awards: Knight Grand Cross of the Order of the Bath; Knight Grand Cross of the Royal Guelphic Order

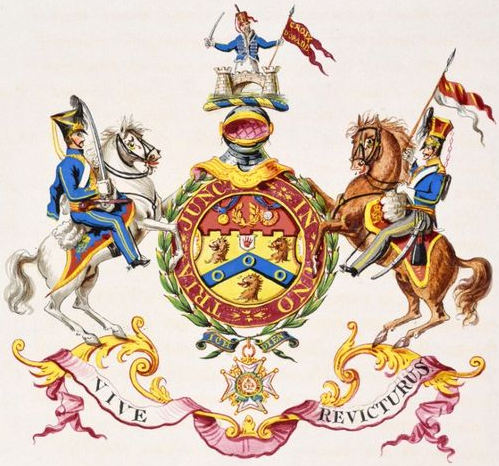
Heraldic achievement of Lieutenant General (Richard) Hussey Vivian, 1st Baron Vivian; blazon: Or, on a chevron azure between three lion's heads erased proper as many annulets of the first on a chief embattled gules a wreath of oak of the first between two medals that on the dexter representing the gold medal and clasp given to the first baron for his services in the actions of Sahagreen, Benevente and Orthes and that on the sinister the silver Waterloo medal. An example of debased heraldry. They are a differenced version of the arms of Vivian of Truro in Cornwall. Also shown is an inescutcheon with the Red Hand of Ulster referencing his baronetcy.

Lieutenant-General Richard Hussey Vivian, 1st Baron Vivian (28 July 1775 – 20 August 1842), known as Sir Hussey Vivian from 1815 to 1828 and Sir Hussey Vivian, Bt, from 1828 to 1841, was a British cavalry leader from the Vivian family.

== Early career ==
Vivian was the son of John Vivian (1750–1826), of Truro, Cornwall, and his wife Betsey, daughter of the Reverend Richard Cranch, and the brother of John Henry Vivian. He was educated at Truro Grammar School, then at Harrow and Exeter College, Oxford, Vivian entered the army in 1793, and less than a year later became a captain in the 28th Foot. Under Lord Moira he served in the campaign of 1794 in Flanders and the Netherlands. At the end of the expedition, the 28th bore a distinguished part in Lord Cathcart's action of Geldermalsen. In 1798 Vivian was transferred to the 7th Light Dragoons (later Hussars), and in Sir Ralph Abercromby's division was present in the Helder campaign in Holland at the battles of Bergen and Alkmaar (19 September to 6 October 1799).

== Peninsular War ==
In 1800, he received his majority, and in 1804 he became lieutenant colonel of the 7th. In command of this regiment he sailed to join Lieutenant-General Sir David Baird at Corunna in 1808, and took part in Lord Henry Paget's cavalry fights at Sahagún and Benavente. During the retreat of Lieut-General Sir John Moore's army the 7th were constantly employed with the rearguard. Vivian was present at the Battle of Corunna, and returned with the remainder of the army to England. It was not until September 1813 that the 7th returned to the Peninsula. On 24 November, Vivian (now colonel and aide-de-camp to the Prince Regent) was appointed to command a light cavalry brigade (13th and 14th Light Dragoons) under Rowland Hill, 1st Viscount Hill in Wellington's army. With this corps he served at the Battle of the Nive (9–13 December).

In January 1814, Vivian transferred to lead a light cavalry brigade in William Carr Beresford's corps. The 1,000-strong unit included the 18th Hussars and the 1st King's German Legion Hussars. Vivian took a marked part in the action of Gave de Pau and the Battle of Orthez. On 8 April, Vivian fought a brilliant action at Croix d'Orade on the Ers River, where he was very severely wounded. In this clash, the 18th Hussars seized a key bridge intact, helping Wellington to isolate the French defenders of Toulouse. At the beginning of 1815 he was appointed Knight Commander of the Order of the Bath (KCB); he had been a major general for several months.

== Waterloo ==
In April 1815, Sir Hussey Vivian was appointed to command the 6th Brigade of the Earl of Uxbridge's Cavalry Division. Vivian's brigade included the 10th and 18th Hussars as well as the 1st and 2nd Hussars King's German Legion. At the Battle of Waterloo the 6th Brigade was posted on the Duke of Wellington's left flank. In the late afternoon, Vivian's regiments, with those of General Ormsby Vandeleur's 4th Brigade, were ordered to move to support the centre of the line, which was under pressure from Napoleon's Imperial Guard. After the enemy were repulsed, Vivian's hussars made the final charge of the day between Hougoumont and La Haye Sainte, sweeping the Middle Guard and Line units before them before breaking upon the squares of the Old Guard, which they soon learned to avoid. This service was rewarded by the thanks of both houses of Parliament, an award of the KCH, and the Orders of Maria Theresa and St. Vladimir from the emperors of Austria and Russia.

After hostilities had ceased, Vivian remained in France as part of the Army of Occupation in command of the 2nd Brigade of Cavalry. In 1816 he was censured by army commander Lieutenant General Lord Combermere, under orders from the Duke of Wellington, for failing to report a disturbance in a French theatre caused by officers of the 18th Hussars.

== Later career ==
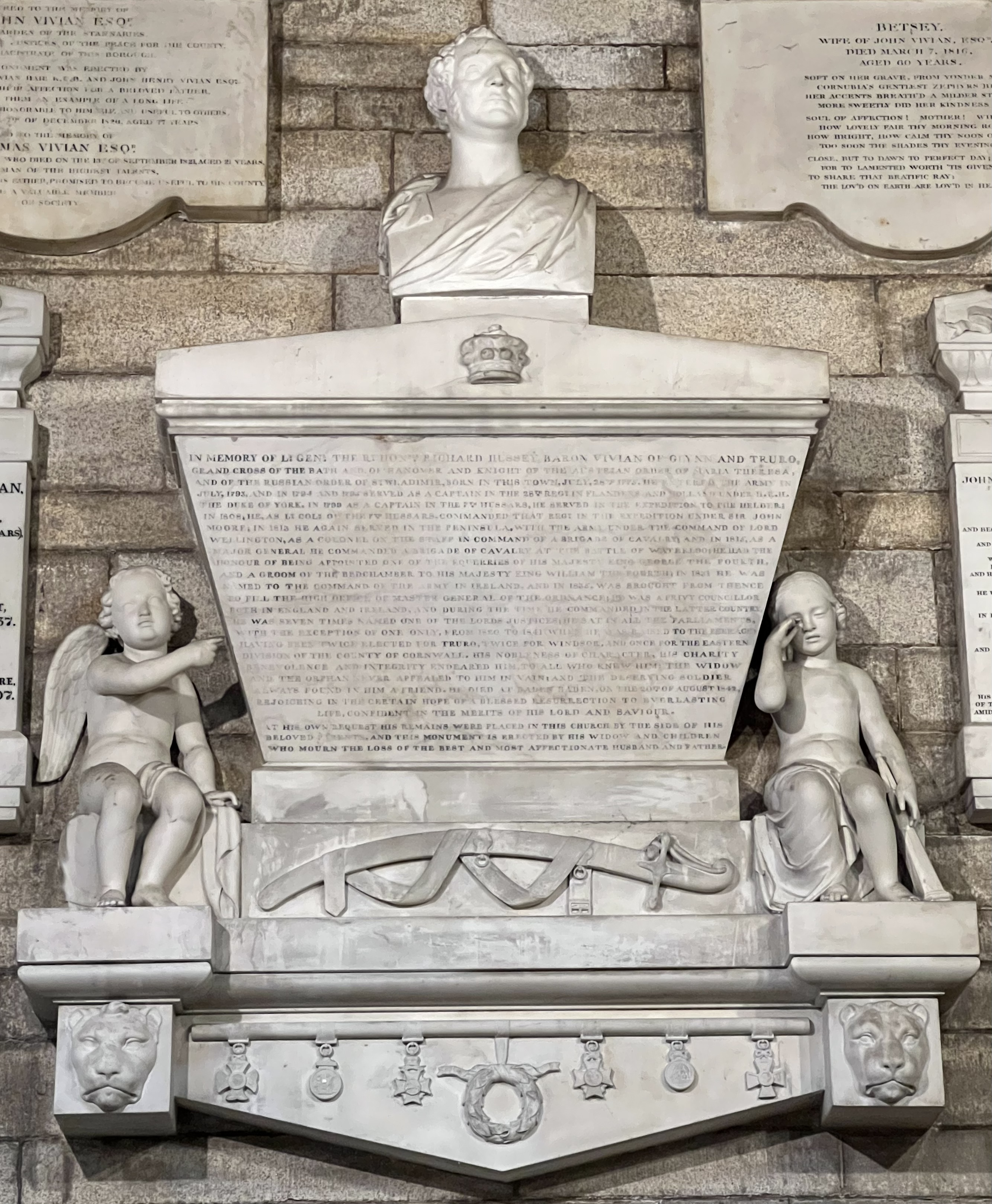
Memorial in Truro Cathedral

Vivian sat in the House of Commons as member for Truro and then Windsor from 1821 to 1831, after which he was made commander of the forces in Ireland and given the GCH. He was also appointed to the Privy Council of Ireland in 1831.

From 1825 to 1830 he was Inspector-General of the Cavalry and in 1830 was appointed a Groom of the Bedchamber, serving King William IV throughout his reign until 1837, after which he was promoted Knight Grand Cross of the Order of the Bath (GCB). In 1835 he became Master-General of the Ordnance (until 1841) and was sworn of the Privy Council of the United Kingdom the same year. In 1837 he was elected MP for East Cornwall, sitting until 1841.

He was created a baronet of Truro in the County of Cornwall in 1827. In 1841, he was elected to the Royal Society as a Fellow in February and was raised to the peerage as Baron Vivian, of Glynn and of Truro in the County of Cornwall in the Peerage of the United Kingdom in August.

A year later he died at Baden-Baden and was succeeded by his eldest son, to whom he also bequeathed his recently acquired estate at Glynn, near Bodmin.

== Family ==
His first marriage was on 14 September 1804 to Eliza (1784–1831), daughter of Philip Champion de Crespigny (1738–1803), with whom he had the following children:

- Charles Crespigny Vivian, 2nd Baron Vivian (1808–1886)
- Charlotte Eliza Vivian (1815–1877), who married General Charles George James Arbuthnot
- John Cranch Walker Vivian (1818–1879), Liberal politician
- Jane Frances Anne Vivian (1824–1860), who married Henry Hodgetts-Foley
- Georgina Agnes Augusta Vivian (1828–1835)

He married secondly Letitia Webster, daughter of Rev. James Agnew Webster, and had at least one child:

- Lalage Letitia Caroline Vivian (1835–1875), who married Henry Hyde Nugent Bankes

A natural son, Sir Robert Vivian (1802–1887), was brought up as one of the family. He had a distinguished military career in India.

== Notes ==
Parliament of the United Kingdom
Preceded by Lord FitzRoy Somerset; William Tomline	Member of Parliament for Truro; 1820–1826; With: William Gossett	Succeeded by Lord FitzRoy Somerset; William Tomline
Preceded by Edward Cromwell Disbrowe; John Ramsbottom	Member of Parliament for Windsor; 1826–1831; With: John Ramsbottom	Succeeded by Edward Stanley; John Ramsbottom
Preceded by Sir William Molesworth, Bt; Sir William Salusbury-Trelawny, Bt	Member of Parliament for East Cornwall; 1837–1841; With: Lord Eliot	Succeeded by Lord Eliot; William Rashleigh
Military offices
Preceded by Sir Colquhoun Grant	Colonel of the 12th (The Prince of Wales's); Royal Regiment of (Light) Dragoons (Lancers); 1827–1837	Succeeded by Sir Henry John Cumming
Preceded by Sir John Byng	Commander-in-Chief, Ireland; 1831–1836	Succeeded by Sir Edward Blakeney
Preceded by Sir George Murray	Master-General of the Ordnance; 1835–1841	Succeeded by Sir George Murray
Preceded by Sir Frederick Ponsonby	Colonel of the 1st (Royal) Regiment of Dragoons; 1837–1842	Succeeded by Sir Arthur Benjamin Clifton
Peerage of the United Kingdom
New creation	Baron Vivian; 1841–1842; Member of the House of Lords (1841–1842)	Succeeded by Charles Vivian
Baronetage of the United Kingdom
New creation	Baronet of Truro; 1828–1842	Succeeded by Charles Vivian
