= Helen Pyke =

English pianist, teacher and composer

Helen Lucas Pyke (June, 1905 – 13 July 1954) was an English pianist, teacher and composer, born in Paddington, London. She was educated at the London Academy of Music under Henry Yorke Trotter and Horace Kesteven.

She composed songs, including A Requiem - When I am dead my dearest (setting Christina Rossetti), and April (text William Watson), both published in 1948, and educational piano pieces such as 'Song of the Kinkajou' (originally from the piano suite for children Five Zoo Pictures, 1929). In the mid-1930s, she was living at Studio 4, 59 Edwardes Square, London W.8.

As a pianist, she specialised in piano duet performances, initially with Paul Hamburger. They premiered Alan Rawsthorne's The Creel in 1940, and the Fantasia on The Irish Ho-Hoane, Op.13 by Bernard Stevens in 1949. Malcolm Arnold dedicated his Concerto for Piano Duet and Strings, op. 32 to Pyke and Hamburger, who gave its first performance in August 1951, and again at the Proms in 1953. Just before her death in 1954 Pyke also partnered for piano duets with Maurice Cole.

Between the wars she worked for ENSA, the Arts Council and the YMCA. She married the musicologist Mosco Carner in 1944. He dedicated his 1958 book Puccini: a Critical Biography to the memory of his wife.
