= Cardinham =

Village in Cornwall, England

Coordinates: 50.489°N 4.648°W

Cardinham: Cornish: Kardhinan
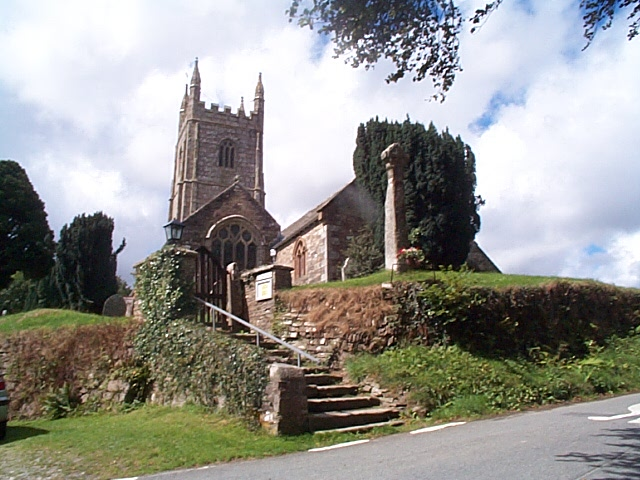
- Cardinham Church

- Location within Cornwall
- Population: 623 (Civil Parish, 2011)
- OS grid reference: SX122687
- Civil parish: Cardinham
- Unitary authority: Cornwall
- Ceremonial county: Cornwall
- Region: South West
- Country: England
- Sovereign state: United Kingdom
- Post town: BODMIN
- Postcode district: PL30
- Dialling code: 01208
- Police: Devon and Cornwall
- Fire: Cornwall
- Ambulance: South Western
- UK Parliament: North Cornwall

Cardinham (Cornish: Kardhinan) is a civil parish and a village in mid Cornwall, England. The village is approximately three-and-a-half miles (6 km) east-northeast of Bodmin. The hamlets of Fletchersbridge, Millpool, Milltown, Mount, Old Cardinham Castle and Welltown are in the parish.

Large areas, which were once deciduous woodland, are now plantations of conifers known as Cardinham Woods and managed by Forestry England. Edmund John Glynn, of Glynn House in the parish, rebuilt the house at Glynn in 1805 (it has a front of nine bays and a portico).

== Early history ==
Richard Fitz Turold (Thorold) was an Anglo-Norman landowner of the eleventh century, mentioned in the Domesday Survey. He had a castle at Cardinham, where he was a major tenant and steward of Robert of Mortain. The holding included the manor of Penhallam. His son was William Fitz Richard of Cardinham. Restormel Castle belonged to the Cardinhams in the 12th century, until Andrew de Cardinham's daughter married Thomas de Tracey. Cardinham Castle remained in the family (succeeded by the Dinhams) until the 14th century and later became a ruin. The manor of Cardinham is one of the few where the custom of Free Bench is recorded: by this a widow could retain tenure of the land until she remarried.

The Tenant-in-chief of the manor of Glynn as recorded in the Domesday Book (1086) was Robert, Count of Mortain; when it was one of several manors held by Osferth of Okehampton, County Devon, who had also held it before 1066 and paid tax for 1 virgate of land. There was land for 2 ploughs. There were 1 plough, 1 serf, 2 villeins, 6 smallholders, 100 acres of woodland, 40 acres of pasture, 4 unbroken mares, 2 cows, 24 sheep and 7 goats. The value of the manor was 10 shillings though it has formerly been worth £2 sterling. As of 25 May 2019, the titles of Baron of Cardinham (Feudal barony of Cardinham) and Lord of the Manor of Cardinham are jointly held by an American citizen.

Pinsla or Pinchley park was a deer park belonging to the Robartes family of Lanhydrock; this park was disparked in the 18th century.

== Climate ==
The highest temperature recorded is 32.1 °C (89.8 °F) on 24 June 2026. The dew point of 24.9 °C (76.8 °F) was the highest ever recorded in the United Kingdom and the lowest is −8.4 °C (16.9 °F) on 7 February 1991.

In the first 50 days of 2026, Cardinham had 50 days of rain.

Climate data for Cardinham 200m amsl (1991–2020) (extremes 1990–present)
| Month | Jan | Feb | Mar | Apr | May | Jun | Jul | Aug | Sep | Oct | Nov | Dec | Year |
|---|---|---|---|---|---|---|---|---|---|---|---|---|---|
| Record high °C (°F) | 13.3 (55.9) | 14.6 (58.3) | 21.0 (69.8) | 23.8 (74.8) | 30.6 (87.1) | 32.1 (89.8) | 31.4 (88.5) | 31.6 (88.9) | 27.5 (81.5) | 23.4 (74.1) | 19.0 (66.2) | 14.1 (57.4) | 31.6 (88.9) |
| Mean daily maximum °C (°F) | 8.1 (46.6) | 8.3 (46.9) | 10.1 (50.2) | 12.4 (54.3) | 15.3 (59.5) | 17.6 (63.7) | 19.2 (66.6) | 19.1 (66.4) | 17.4 (63.3) | 14.0 (57.2) | 10.9 (51.6) | 8.7 (47.7) | 13.5 (56.3) |
| Daily mean °C (°F) | 5.7 (42.3) | 5.6 (42.1) | 7.0 (44.6) | 8.8 (47.8) | 11.5 (52.7) | 13.9 (57.0) | 15.7 (60.3) | 15.7 (60.3) | 14.0 (57.2) | 11.3 (52.3) | 8.3 (46.9) | 6.3 (43.3) | 10.3 (50.5) |
| Mean daily minimum °C (°F) | 3.2 (37.8) | 2.9 (37.2) | 4.0 (39.2) | 5.2 (41.4) | 7.7 (45.9) | 10.2 (50.4) | 12.1 (53.8) | 12.2 (54.0) | 10.7 (51.3) | 8.5 (47.3) | 5.8 (42.4) | 3.9 (39.0) | 7.2 (45.0) |
| Record low °C (°F) | −7.1 (19.2) | −8.4 (16.9) | −6.1 (21.0) | −3.3 (26.1) | 0.1 (32.2) | 3.4 (38.1) | 6.6 (43.9) | 5.8 (42.4) | 3.6 (38.5) | −0.9 (30.4) | −4.8 (23.4) | −5.3 (22.5) | −8.4 (16.9) |
| Average precipitation mm (inches) | 155.1 (6.11) | 116.9 (4.60) | 96.4 (3.80) | 91.4 (3.60) | 80.0 (3.15) | 87.1 (3.43) | 98.8 (3.89) | 108.1 (4.26) | 101.4 (3.99) | 153.6 (6.05) | 174.7 (6.88) | 168.5 (6.63) | 1,431.7 (56.37) |
| Average precipitation days (≥ 1.0 mm) | 17.9 | 15.3 | 14.3 | 13.2 | 11.4 | 11.8 | 13.7 | 14.8 | 13.3 | 17.3 | 19.0 | 18.8 | 180.8 |
Source 1: Met Office
Source 2: Starlings Roost Weather

== Parish church ==
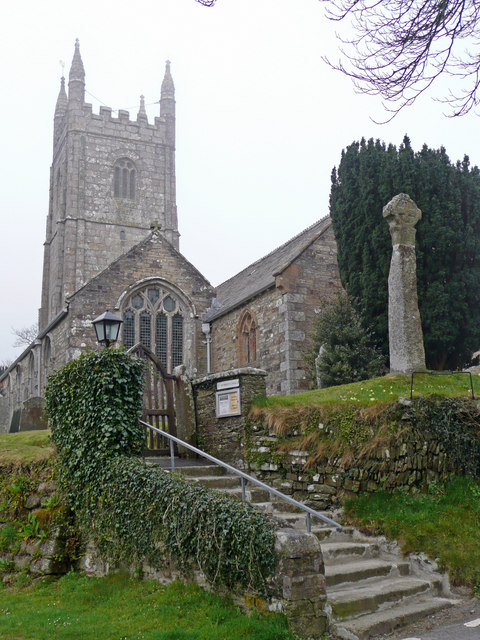
St Meubred's church (note the cross on the right)

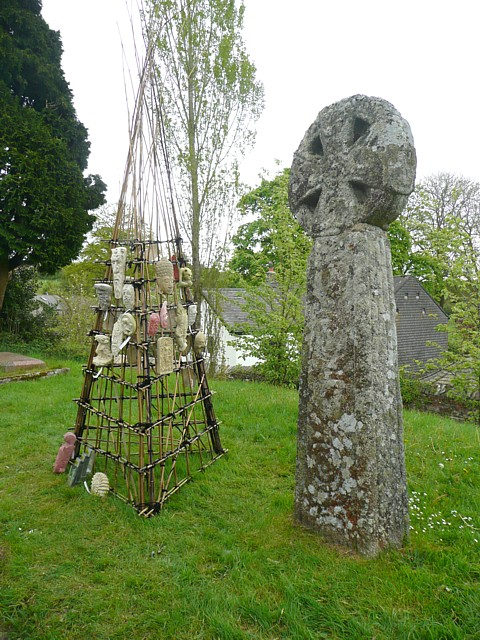
One of the crosses in the churchyard

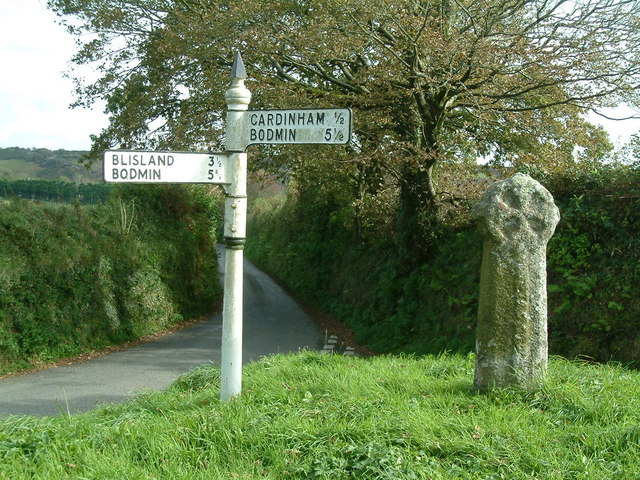
Treslea Cross

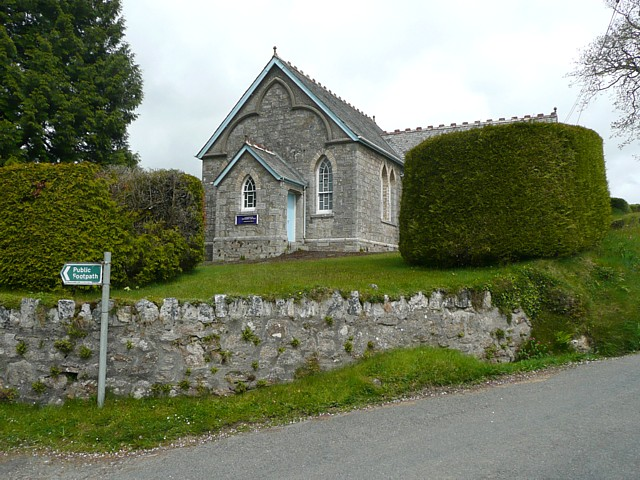
Cardinham Methodist Church

The parish church is dedicated to St Meubred: it has north and south aisles and a tower of granite. The chancel suffered bomb damage in World War II. In the church is the brass of Thomas Awmarle, rector of Cardinham, d. 1401?

Two freestanding Celtic crosses of stone, bearing inscriptions in Latin have been found in Cardinham; both had been embedded in the walls of the fifteenth-century church and were moved after their discovery to the churchyard. One has been dated to the fifth to eighth centuries, the other to the tenth or eleventh centuries: Arthur Langdon (1896) also records five other stone crosses in the parish. Andrew Langdon (1996) records two crosses in the churchyard, Higher Deviock Cross, Pinsla Cross at Glynn, Poundstock Cross, Treslea or Wydeyeat Cross and Treslea Down Cross.

== China clay ==
The former quarry of the Glynn Valley China Clay Works has closed down and is now flooded. It was in operation from the 1940s but since 2015 a shipping container on the edge of the lake has been used for tourist accommodation.

== Cornish wrestling ==
Cornish wrestling tournaments, for prizes were held in Cardinham in the 1800s. In addition, the Duke of Cornwall Rifles held tournaments here.

== Notable residents ==
- Cassie Patten, the British Olympic swimmer, was born at Cardinham.
- John Penrose, born in Cardinham, where his father, also named John, was vicar of the parish. He was afterwards Vicar of Poundstock.

Glynn

- Lieutenant General Hussey Vivian, 1st Baron Vivian, GCB, GCH, PC (1775–1842), lived at Glynn House
- Peter D. Mitchell, biochemist and Nobel Prize winner, founded Glynn Research Ltd in Glynn House.

== See also ==
- Feudal barony of Cardinham
