= Jennifer Moyle =

British biochemist

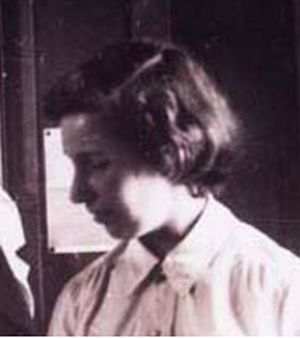
- Jennifer Moyle at Cambridge, ca 1950
- Born: 30 April 1921; Norwich
- Died: 1 August 2016 (aged 95)
- Education: Girton College, Cambridge; University of Edinburgh (PhD 1958)
- Known for: Development of the chemiosmotic theory
- Scientific career
- Fields: Biochemistry
- Workplaces: Auxiliary Territorial Service; Cambridge University; Glynn House, Bodmin
- Academic advisors: Margery Stephenson, Malcolm Dixon, Peter Mitchell

Jennifer Moyle (April 30, 1921 - August 1, 2016) was a British biochemist who helped discover the chemiosmotic mechanism of ATP synthesis. She also conducted research on the properties of purified isocitric enzymes and calcium import in the mitochondria during cellular respiration.

== Biography ==
Jennifer Moyle was born in Norwich, England and attended Norwich High School for Girls. She was the daughter of S.H. Leonard Moyle and Olive M. Dakin. She had a sister named Vivian, who also studied biochemistry.

Moyle began schooling at Norwich High School for Girls in 1926 where she remained until entering Girton College of Cambridge University in 1939. While studying there, she earned a "Title of Bachelor of Arts Degree", the equivalent of modern-day Bachelor of Arts, in 1942. She specialized in Biochemistry, and also attended many lectures on philosophy.

In 1955, Moyle began her PhD work at the University of Edinburgh, and was awarded a PhD in zoology in 1958.

Moyle conducted a lot of research regarding cellular respiration, oxidative phosphorylation, and properties of purified isocitric enzymes. She was a major contributor to the development of the chemiosmotic theory regarding ATP synthesis.

== Military service ==
Shortly after earning her degree, Moyle entered the Auxiliary Territorial Service during World War II. She went into military intelligence, where she soon become an intelligence officer in MI8. There, she was promoted to second in command of a section dealing with intelligence obtained from ciphers breaking German codes.

After World War II, she continued service for another year helping teach servicemen how to return to civilian life.

== Research ==
Moyle began her career in biochemistry research in 1954 when she joined a Cambridge biochemistry lab. She began as an assistant to Marjory Stephenson, but after a few years Stevenson introduced Moyle to Peter D. Mitchell, with whom Moyle worked for the majority of her research career. Jennifer's main research focus was cellular respiration. for a short period, Moyle worked with Malcolm Dixon, and the two focused their work on the purification of isocitric enzymes.

=== Purified isocitric enzymes ===
Jennifer Moyle published an article on the properties of purified isocitric enzymes in August 1956 with Malcolm Dixon. The article describes the chemical and physical properties of isocitric enzymes, various reactions they are involved in, causes for their inactivation, and a hypothesis for the mechanism of reaction. Moyle and Dixon authored another paper regarding the isocitric enzyme Triphosphopyridine Nucleotide-linked isoCitric Dehydrogenase-Oxalosuccinic Carboxylase. The paper outlines the proper method of the purification of that enzyme.

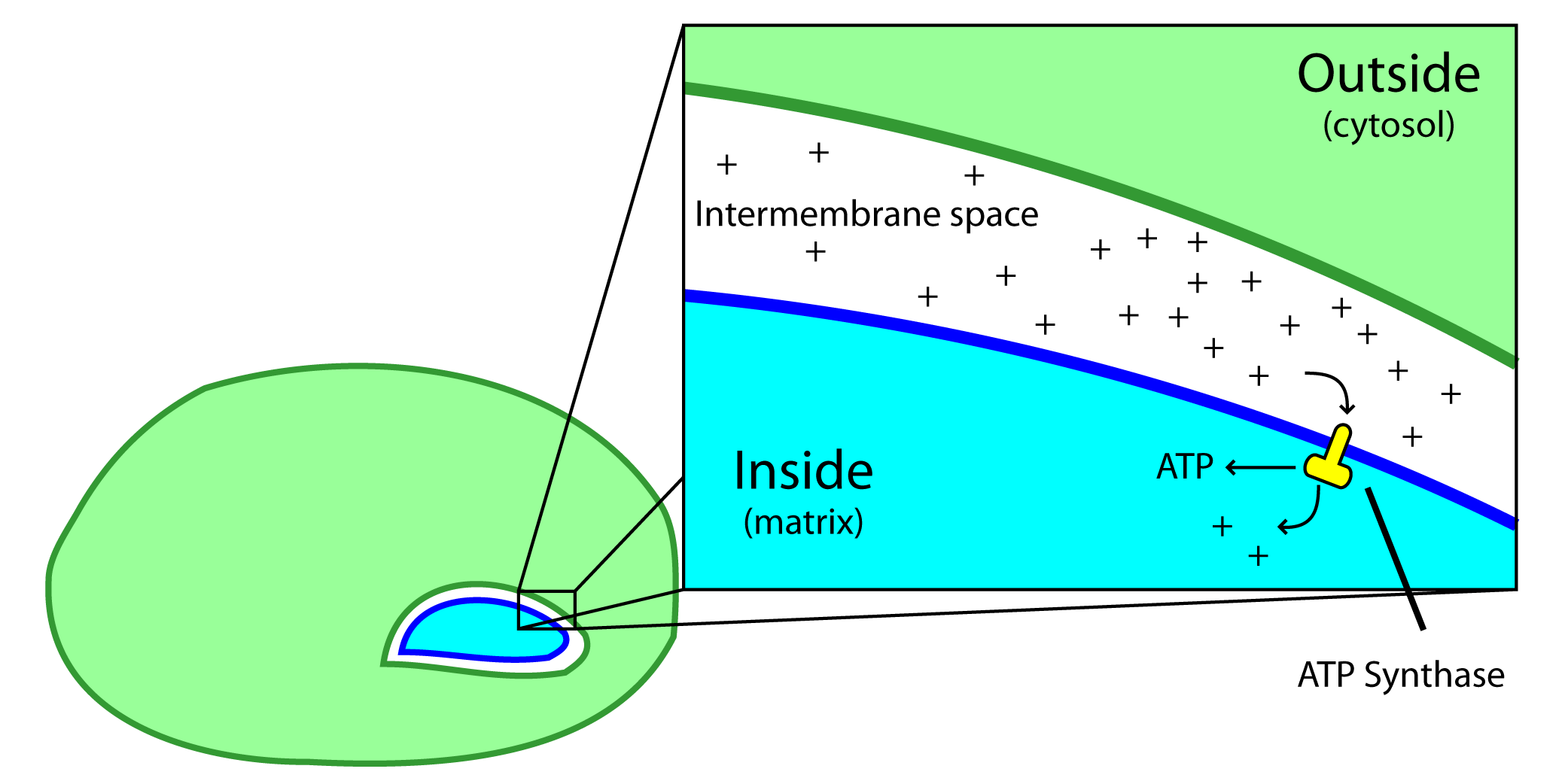
Chemiosmosis during ATP synthesis is the movement of ions across the mitochondrial membrane, down their electrochemical gradient.

=== Chemiosmotic theory ===
One of Moyle's major contributions to the field of biochemistry is her contribution to the development of the chemiosmotic theory. Moyle conducted research with Peter Mitchell, at Glynn House, on chemiosmotic reactions and reaction mechanisms, which led to the development of the theory in 1967. The chemiosmotic theory explained the mechanism for oxidative phosphorylation, stating that ATP synthesis requires chemiosmosis to function. The proton gradient across the inner membrane of the mitochondria is created by the electron transport chain. This causes protons to re-enter the mitochondrial matrix through the protein ATP synthase. The movement of protons through this enzyme causes mechanical movement and a conformational change in the enzyme that combines ADP and inorganic phosphate to produce ATP. The proposal of the chemiosmotic theory was not accepted in the scientific community for over ten years. When it finally was accepted, Peter Mitchell received a Nobel prize for their work. While the Nobel committee recognized Moyle's contributions, she did not receive a Nobel prize.

=== Mitochondria and cellular respiration ===
The chemiosmotic theory was radical at the time, and it was not immediately accepted by the scientific community. One experiment that Moyle and Mitchell conducted in 1967 was an investigation of ways to improve the precision at which the quotients of translocation of a proton to oxygen can be measured, and what the optimum conditions are for these measurements. Their goal was to improve the precision of that measurement in order to allow others to confirm their findings in the proposed chemiosmotic hypothesis. They conducted this experiment because the arrangement of the electron transport chain was only a hypothesis at the time, and it had been inferred from a quotient of protons translocated to oxygen in the chain (→H^{+}/O). Moyle and Mitchell isolated mitochondria from a rat liver, measured pH displacement across the mitochondrial membrane, and computed the relationship between proton translocation and changes in pH. They found that the pulses of acidification of the inner membrane space of the mitochondria are due to the transport of H^{+} ions from the mitochondrial matrix into the inner membrane space, and can't be attributed to the formation and breakdown of an intermediate as was previously hypothesized. Their work provided sufficient detail for others to reproduce their experiment and confirm their previous findings regarding the chemiosmotic theory.

An article published jointly with Peter Mitchell in 1977 outlines their work regarding calcium import into mitochondria in the rat's liver during cellular respiration. In the article, they state that this import of calcium happens electrophoretically, and that evidence had already been obtained showing that one electric charge is translocated through a lanthanide-sensitive transporter system per a single calcium ion (Ca^{2+}) imported. Moyle and Mitchell isolated rat liver mitochondria to investigate their hypothesis that the calcium transporter is in fact a calcium phosphate transporter, defined in the article as a "(Ca_{2})^{4+}—HPO_{4}^{2-} symporter." Their results were consistent with their hypothesis, showing that a lanthanide-sensitive (Ca_{2})^{4+}—HPO_{4}^{2-} symporter that is insensitive to NEM and mersalyl catalyzed calcium translocation in the mitochondria of the rat liver.

== Research colleagues ==
=== Peter D. Mitchell ===
Jennifer Moyle and Peter Mitchell were research colleagues for over thirty years, beginning around 1948 and continuing until Moyle's retirement in 1983. They worked together on many research projects, including the development of the chemiosmotic theory. Moyle designed many of the experiments that were fundamental in testing the theory's hypothesis, and she helped Mitchell win the Nobel Prize in chemistry in 1978.

Moyle and Mitchell also cofounded charitable research company known as Glynn Research Ltd., a research institute that promoted biological research from 1964 to 1987.

=== Malcolm Dixon ===
Jennifer Moyle and Malcolm Dixon worked together for roughly two years. During this time together, they researched the properties of purified isocitric enzymes and published their findings.
