= Margaret Rose =

Margaret Rose may refer to:

- Princess Margaret, Countess of Snowdon (1930–2002)
- SS Margaret Rose, Indian cargo ship
- Margaret Rose Henry (born 1944), American politician
- Margaret Rose Kelsick, Montserratian politician
- Margaret Rose (lyricist) (1888–1948), lyricist who co-wrote "The Little Road to Bethlehem"
- Margaret Rose Sanford (1918–2006), American civic leader
- Margaret Rose Vendryes (1955–2022), visual artist
- Margaret Rose Robertson Watt (1868–1948)
- Maggie Rose (born 1988), American soul and country music singer
- Maggie Rose, character in the 1993 novel Along Came a Spider

== See also ==
- Margaret Preston (Margaret Rose Preston, 1875–1963), Australian painter
- Margaret Rowe (1949–2022), Australian former politician
