= Dame Shirley =

Dame Shirley may refer to:

== British title DBE ==
- Dame Shirley Bassey (born 1937), Welsh singer
- Dame Shirley Conran (1932–2024), British designer, writer, entrepreneur
- Dame Shirley Paget (1924–2017), public servant, writer, marchioness
- Dame Shirley Pearce (born 1954), British academic and psychologist
- Dame Shirley Porter (born 1930), British politician, Tesco heiress
- Dame Stephanie Shirley, British information technology pioneer, businesswoman and philanthropist

== Pen name ==
- Louise Clappe (1819–1906), American writer, used pen name "Dame Shirley" for her "Shirley letters"
