= Michael Head =

Michael Head may refer to:

- Michael Head (composer) (1900–1976), British composer, pianist, organist and singer
- Michael Head (popular musician) (born 1961), British singer-songwriter
