= Emily Edroff-Smith =

Organist and educator

- Born: Emily Edroff; 1867
- Died: 1953 (aged 85–86); Hampstead

Emily Edroff-Smith (born Emily Edroff, 1867–1953) was an English organist, organ teacher and piano teacher. She was one of the few English women concert organists in the late nineteenth century.

== Life ==
Born into a musical family in London in 1867, her great-uncle William Edroff had been musical director of the Royal Grecian Theatre. She was taught primarily by Frederick Scotson Clark, founder of the London Organ School. She first came to the attention of the press in 1883 when assisting him at a concert at the Fisheries Exhibition in London. In 1884 she took part in student recitals and after performing Bach's Toccata and Fugue in G Minor received the most attention in the press. Between 1887 and 1895 she gave over two dozen publicized recitals at the London Organ school and elsewhere, first as an organ student and later as organ Professor for the school. In June 1895 she gave two concerts in the St George's Hall in Liverpool causing quite a sensation. The Musical standard newspaper noted "Miss Edroff is an exceedingly clever player, and rather astonished those who had gone out of curiosity and to scoff".

Her recital repertoire was extensive, encompassing composers from Bach to Widor. In addition to her work as a concert organist from 1893 to at least 1900 she worked as Professor of Organ at the London Organ School, where she taught both male and female organ students. In 1909 she became an Associate of the Royal College of Music (ARCM).

She was a friend of Kaikhosru Shapurji Sorabji's mother and helped him in his studies. In 1953, Emily was one of the twenty-three signatories of a letter presented to the composer to encourage him to record some of his works.
