= Maurice Cole (pianist) =

English pianist, teacher and adjudicator

Maurice Cole (1902 – 1990), was an English pianist, teacher and adjudicator.

== Career ==
Maurice Arthur Cole was born in Streatham, London, on 29 January 1902, to Arthur John Cole, a warehouse worker, and Laura Maria Randall. He studied at the Guildhall School of Music under Carlos Sobrino (1861-1927), and later privately with Arthur De Greef in London and Brussels. Cole made his Manchester debut on 1 November 1921 (playing Beethoven), and his Wigmore Hall debut in 1922. That year he was also the first pianist to broadcast a recital on the BBC, from Marconi House Studios. He also broadcast from the BBC's Savoy Hill studios and became a frequent broadcaster throughout the 1920s and 1930s. He went on to perform, amongst many other compositions, both books of Bach's Well-Tempered Clavier on the BBC Third Programme. From 1927 he made regular appearances at the Proms.

During the Second World War, he was a member of ENSA and entertained the forces, both in London and abroad. He was professor at the Guildhall School of Music from 1953, was appointed Professor of Pianoforte at the School on two occasions and was a member of the Incorporated Society of Musicians. His pupils included Marjorie Clementi (1927-1997) and Leonard Rafter (1912-1964). He partnered with the pianist composer Helen Pyke for piano duets before her death in 1954. In 1958, he went on an extensive performance tour to Australia, New Zealand, Fiji and other countries.

In 1972 Cole made a television appearance to celebrate his - and the BBC's - 50th anniversary of broadcasting.

== Personal life ==
Cole married the violinist Winifred Small in 1927 and often played with her in concerts and radio broadcasts. With cellist Kathleen Moorhouse they recorded as the Maurice Cole Trio. They lived at 8 Ladbroke Square, London W11. In 1947 he married Doris May Allen, a gifted pianist and music teacher from Hampshire, who once accompanied Eda Kersey, and lived at 3, Villas on the Heath, London NW3, where he also took lessons.

Maurice Cole died in Portsmouth on 14 April 1990.

== Selected recordings ==
Cole recorded extensively in the 1920s and 1930s for release on 78 rpm for Vocalion and Broadcast Twelve, and on 33 rpm for Classics Club Records during the late 1950s (later reissued by Saga Records).

78 rpm

- Edvard Grieg, 'Papillon', Franz Schubert, 'Moment Musical', Felix Mendelssohn, 'Bee's Wedding', Frédéric Chopin, Prelude, ACO G 15387 (acoustic recording)
- Balfour Gardiner, 'Humoreske', Cyril Scott, Danse Negre, ACO G 15351 (acoustic recording)
- Sergei Rachmaninoff,' Polichinelle', Moritz Moszkowski, 'En Automne', ACO G 15087 (acoustic recording, Recorded: c. 1924)
- Cécile Chaminade, D'anse Creole/Pierrette', ACO, G15331
- Léo Delibes (arr. Dohnanyi), 'Naila Waltz', ACO G 16111
- Frédéric Chopin, Ballade No. 1, Broadcast Twelve 5076, Recorded: c. 1929
- Frédéric Chopin, Ballade in A-flat, Broadcast Twelve 5034
- John Ireland, 'The Island Spell', Rachmaninoff, Prelude in C-sharp minor, ACO G15523
- Sergei Rachmaninoff, Prelude in C-sharp minor, Franz Liszt, 'Liebesträume', Broadcast Twelve 5008
- Cécile Chaminade, 'Automne', Edvard Grieg, 'Little bird', Christian Sinding, 'Rustle of spring', Broadcast Twelve 5009
- Edvard Grieg, Concerto in A minor, Broadcast F 4011, F 4012, F 4013 (electrical recording)
- Franz Liszt, Hungarian Fantasia, Broadcast Twelve 5087, 5088
- Pyotr Ilyich Tchaikovsky, Concerto No.1 in B-flat minor, Broadcast Twelve 5118, 5119, 5120, 5121
- Gabriel Fauré, Impromptu, Acetate disc recording (located Sakuraphon)

33 rpm

- J. S. Bach, "Concerto in the Italian Style / Overture in the French Manner", Saga Records
- J. S. Bach, Das Wohltemperirte Klavier, Book I and II (The Well-Tempered Clavier) Saga Records (1962)
- Ludwig van Beethoven, Variations Opp. 34 & 35, Rondo in G Op. 51/2, Saga Records
- Johannes Brahms, selected piano pieces, Classics Club
- César Franck, 'Prélude, Choral et Fugue', Classics Club

== Selected performances ==
- April 1924: Bournemouth Easter Festival. Michael Head, Piano Concerto
- 9 September 1927: Proms, Beethoven Piano Concerto No. 3, Henry Wood Symphony Orchestra.
- 18 October 1929: Alnwick, Franck Violin Sonata with Winifred Small
- 15 March 1930: BBC Studio, Eric Fogg, Quintet, with Robert Murchie, Leon Goossens, Haydn Draper, Fred Wood
- 30 September 1930: Proms, Schumann Piano Concerto in A minor, BBC Symphony Orchestra, Henry Wood
- 1 October 1935: Houldsworth Hall, Manchester, Beethoven Trio in Bb, Maurice Cole Trio (Maurice Cole, Winifred Small, Kathleen Moorhouse),
- 23 August 1941: Proms (Last Night), Schumann Piano Concerto in A minor, London Symphony Orchestra, Henry Wood.
- 29 April 1943: Laing Gallery, Newcastle, solo recital, Bach-Busoni, Rachmaninoff, Beethoven, Cyril Scott, Faure
- 5 August 1943: Proms, Rachmaninoff, Rhapsody on a Theme of Paganini, BBC Symphony Orchestra, Adrian Boult
- 24 January 1945: Guildhall, Southampton, Tchaikovsky Piano Concerto No. 1, Southampton Symphony Orchestra, J Ambrose Chalk
- 4 February 1950, Bournemouth Chamber Music Society, Beethoven Scarlatti, Schubert, Frederick Fuller (baritone), Maurice Cole (piano)
- 7 September 1959: Proms, Keyboard Concerto in D minor, BWV 1052, Basil Cameron, Royal Philharmonic Orchestra
- 28 November 1968: Broadcasting House solo recital, Bach, Beethoven, Ravel, Chopin

== Published works ==
- Alberto Ginastera, Violin Concerto. Reduction for violin and piano by Maurice Cole. Boosey & Hawkes, 1967. 1 score + 1 part.

== Criticism ==
Tchaikovsky: Piano Concerto No. 1: "One can perhaps scarcely expect subtlety for eight shillings. What we get is sensible work and passable orchestral tone, with the pianoforte’s part a good way the best of the bargain. Would it be better worth while to improve the orchestral tone, and charge a little more for the records – if that could be arranged?".

Grieg Piano Concerto: "I have never regarded Mr. Cole as an extremely fine interpreter—more as a sound general utility man. Still, the records are well worth trying by those who like hefty playing... ...In the slow movement (of the Greig piano concerto) the opening orchestral section is omitted and the movement is taken a little faster than the marked speed. The pianist is too urgent in this. It needs stroking. Some of his notes clang a trifle more than I like."

Chopin, Rachmaninov, Grieg: "Reginald Paul's British contemporary Maurice Cole made a number of highly impressive discs for Broadcast – I think especially of his Chopin, Rachmaninov and the Grieg Concerto with the same Metropolitan band (and Stanley Chapple) that accompanies Reginald Paul. He also made some less well-known sides for Aco – and they are no less impressive. Cole is an undeservedly neglected figure though some will remember his Bach LPs from the 1960s. He was married to the fiddler Winifred Small, with whom he also recorded, and we should have examples of his musicianship on CD. End of sermon."

Bach: "These are thoughtful, considered performances; you feel Mr. Cole has a reason for everything he does." Review of Cole's recording of Bach's The Well-Tempered Clavier, book II in Gramophone Magazine, June 1963. "…unfailing musicality, control of part playing, complete accuracy, admirably firm rhythm, and an avoidance of all posturing and pretentiousness (would that the same could be said for all other Bach players!)". Review of Cole's recording of Bach's "Well-Tempered Clavier book I" in Gramophone Magazine, November 1962.
