= André Jagendorf =

American professor of plant biology

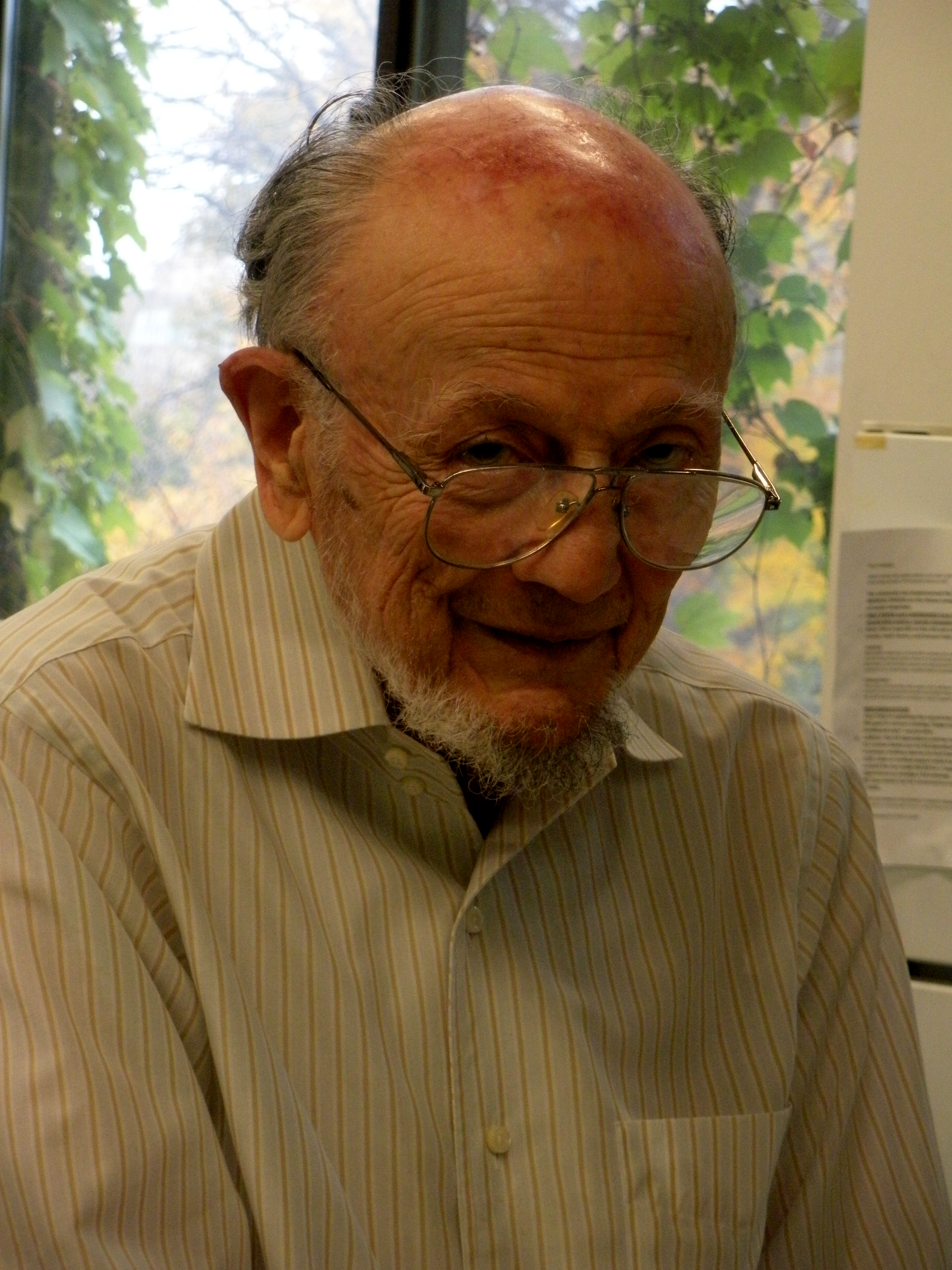
- Born: André Tridon Jagendorf; October 21, 1926; New York City
- Died: March 13, 2017 (aged 90); Ithaca, New York
- Citizenship: United States
- Education: Cornell University, B. S. Plant Physiology, 1948; Yale University, Ph.D. Biophysics, 1951; UCLA, Post Doc. 1951-1953
- Known for: Plant Physiology, Plant Biochemistry, Chemiosmosis
- Awards: United States National Academy of Sciences member (1980); Co-recipient of 2012 Lifetime Achievement Award of The Rebeiz Foundation of Basic Biological Research
- Scientific career
- Fields: Biochemistry, Plant Physiology
- Workplaces: Johns Hopkins University (1953-1966); Cornell University

André Tridon Jagendorf (October 21, 1926 – March 13, 2017) was an American Liberty Hyde Bailey Professor Emeritus in the Section of Plant Biology at Cornell University who is notable for providing direct evidence that chloroplasts synthesize adenosine triphosphate (ATP) using the chemiosmotic mechanism proposed by Peter Mitchell.

== Personal life ==
Jagendorf was born on October 21, 1926, in New York City to Moritz Adolph Jagendorf and Sophie Sheba (Sokolsky) Jagendorf. He married Jean Elizabeth Whitenack on June 12, 1952. They had three children Suzanne, Judith and Daniel (deceased January 2014); 8 grandchildren; and 9 great grandchildren. André Jagendorf died on March 13, 2017.

== University life ==
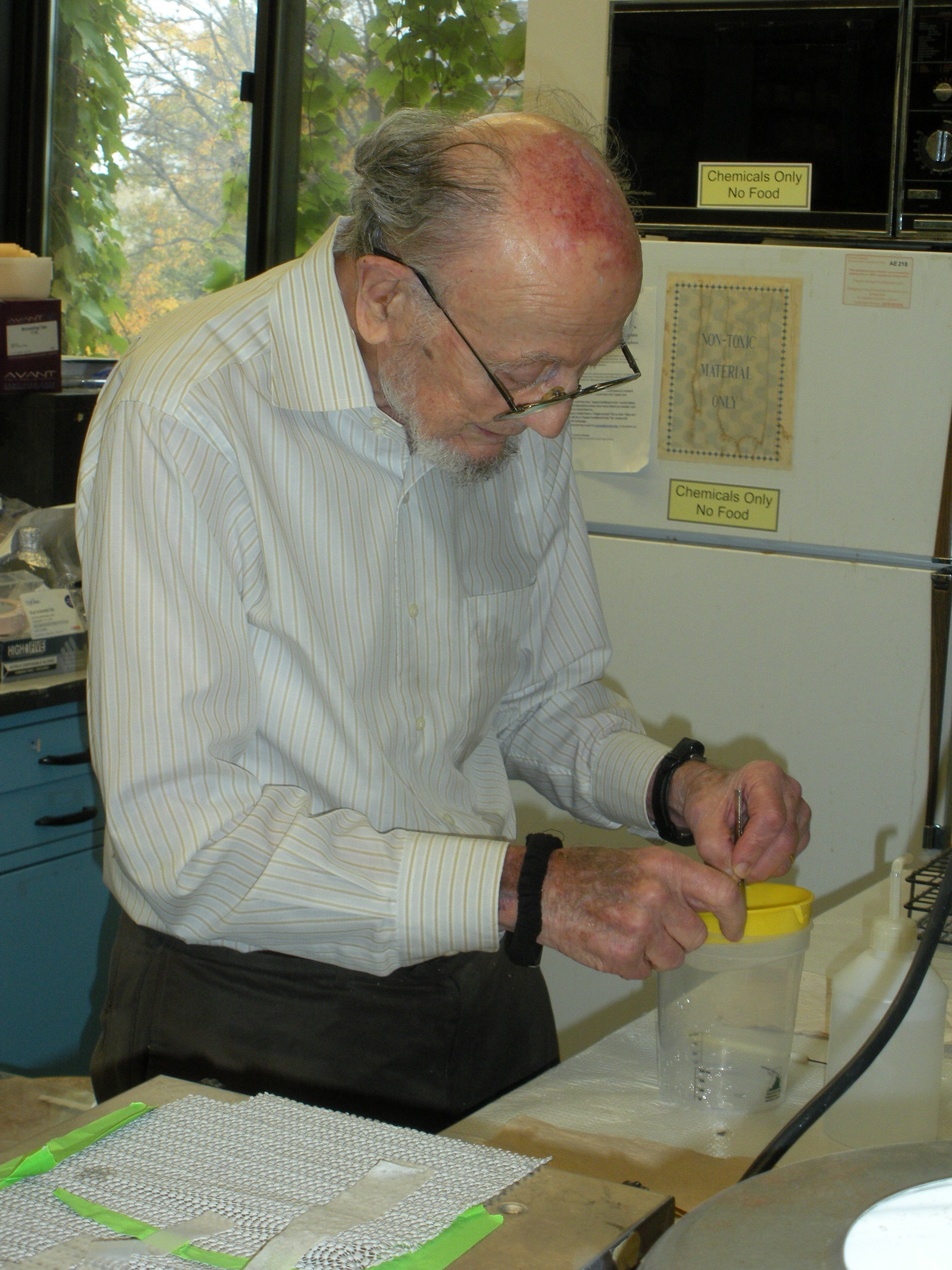
Andre Jagendorf performing an experiment on leaf growth on October 31, 2016

André Jagendorf graduated from Cornell University, where he was strongly influenced by Loren Petry, who taught General Botany. He earned his PhD in 1951 at Yale University under David M. Bonner. André then went to UCLA, where he was awarded a Merck Postdoctoral fellowship and spent what he called "the happiest years of my life" working with Sam Wildman. Jagendorf became an assistant professor at Johns Hopkins University in 1953, as associate professor in 1958, and a full professor in 1966. Jagendorf then returned to Cornell University as professor of plant physiology, and in 1981 became the Liberty Hyde Baily Professor. Since 1997 Jagendorf has been the Liberty Hyde Bailey Professor Emeritus in the Department of Plant Biology and was actively doing research and mentoring young scientists until days before his death.

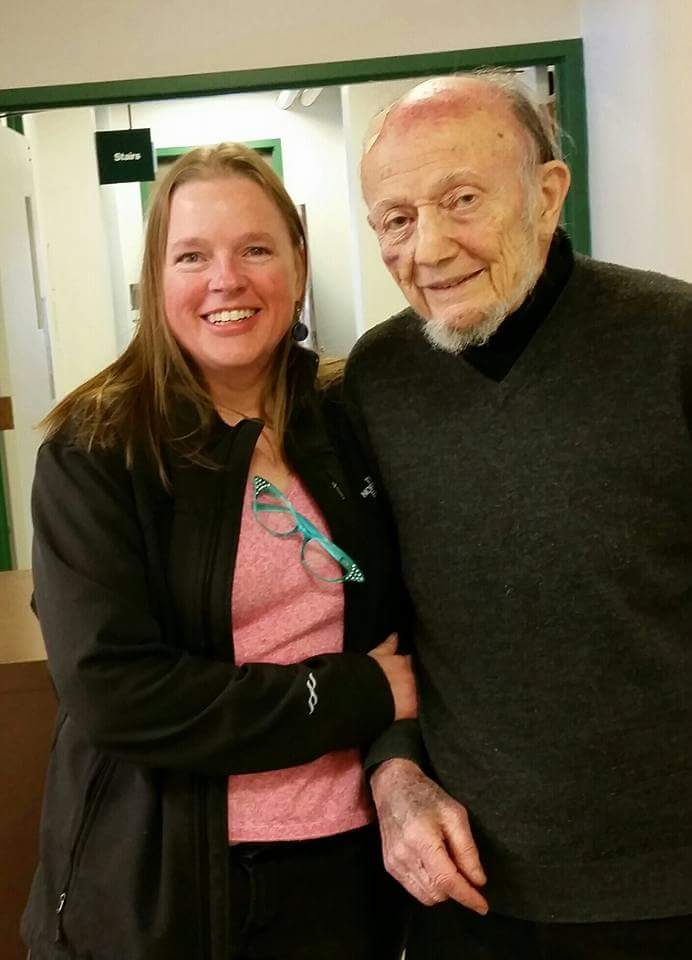
Debbie Dormady Letham and André Jagendorf one month before he died

== Research ==
Jagendorf heard Peter Mitchell give a talk about chemiosmosis at a bioenergetics meeting in Sweden. According to Jagendorf, "His words went into one of my ears and out the other, leaving me feeling annoyed they had allowed such a ridiculous and incomprehensible speaker in. But – Geoffrey [Hind] read Nature. Geoffrey was from England, both better trained and more intelligent than I was. He read Peter Mitchell’s paper, came to me, and said ‘André, could this possibly explain XE [something that preceded ATP formation]?’"

As a result of this conversation, Jagendorf began to communicate with Peter Mitchell who invited him to visit his lab so that he could learn about the chemiosmotic hypothesis. Later that summer Jagendorf did the experimentum crucis that showed that the synthesis of adenosine trisphosphate by chloroplasts depended on the magnitude of the pH difference.

The experiment consisted of creating a pH gradient across the thylakoid membrane of chloroplasts in the dark. Jagendorf and Uribe created the transient pH gradient by incubating chloroplasts in a pH 4 buffer for 15 seconds. They then placed the chloroplasts in a pH 8 buffer that contained ADP and Pi. Under these conditions, the pH of the stroma increased to 8, whereas the pH of the thylakoid lumen remained at 4. An immediate increase in ATP synthesis accompanied the dissipation of the pH gradient across the thylakoid membrane. According to Berg et al. "This incisive experiment was one of the first to unequivocally support the hypothesis put forth by Peter Mitchell that ATP synthesis is driven by proton-motive force." Following Jagendorf's results, Mitchell wrote a letter to Edward C. Slater on November 2, 1965, stating: "experiments have been steadily pushing me towards accepting the chemiosmotic hypothesis and I think I shall feel inclined presently to regard it as a theory."

Jagendorf was also a pioneer in many aspects of chloroplast molecular biology, including DNA repair mechanisms.

== Honors and awards ==
Jagendorf became the President of the American Society of Plant Physiologists in 1967. He received the Charles F. Kettering Award of the American Society of Plant Physiologists in 1978. Jagendorf was elected to the National Academy of Sciences in 1980. Jagendorf received the Charles Reid Barnes Life Membership Award of the American Society of Plant Physiologists in 1989 and received the 2012 Rebeiz Foundation for Basic Research Life Time Achievement Award for his contributions to the understanding of ATP Biosynthesis. At the award presentation, Govindjee, Tom Sharkey and Richard McCarthy gave testimonials. According to Tom Sharkey,

André Jagendorf, a brilliant and an original scientist has made seminal contributions to the development of photophosphorylation and the elucidation of its mode of action. His numerous breakthrough findings established him as a world leader in this field of science. He was a major force among the pioneers that established the presence of photophosphorylation in defiance of the common knowledge prevailing at that time that photosynthesis produces oxygen and reduces CO2 while plant mitochondria produced ATP. He has established...the mechanism of coupling between electron transport and phosphorylation. In search for the elusive intermediate that transfers the redox energy to the synthesis of ATP he devised a simple but ingenious light dark experiment where ATP was generated in the dark by pre-illuminated chloroplasts. Being extremely critical of his own experimental results, he realized that more ATP was produced than expected from the stoichiometry of the electron transfer chains. That finding led him to consider the chemiosmotic hypothesis as an alternative mechanism. In an ingenious set of experiments, he showed light induced formation of pH changes by chloroplasts and the formation of ATP by transferring chloroplasts from acid to base in the dark.

In view of the prevailing theory that assumed the involvement of a hypothetical phosphorylated intermediate and the lack of credible experimental results in support of the chemiosmotic hypothesis his experiment revolutionized the field. Those breakthrough findings paved the way for a new field in science that led to confirmation of the chemiosmotic theory.

During his scientific career André Jagendorf proved himself as a nonconformist who broke new grounds in science using a rare combination of imagination, meticulous scrutiny of experimental results and the ability to devise ingenious experiments that gave answers to major unsolved mechanisms in science.

Jagendorf has been recognized as a Pioneer Member of the American Society of Plant Biologists.

== Podcasts ==
On September 8, 2016, André discussed his life journey with colleague, Robert Turgeon, a professor in the Plant Biology Section.

== Jokes ==
Jagendorf is famous for his jokes and gave a stellar performance at the retirement party for Peter J. Davies on June 18, 2016.
