= Old Cardinham Castle =

Coordinates: 50.480°N 4.646°W

- Location within Cornwall
- OS grid reference: SX124678
- Civil parish: Cardinham
- Unitary authority: Cornwall
- Ceremonial county: Cornwall
- Region: South West
- Country: England
- Sovereign state: United Kingdom

Old Cardinham Castle is a hamlet in Cornwall, England, UK. It is in the parish of Cardinham very close to the site of the Norman Cardinham Castle, caput of the feudal barony of Cardinham.
