= London Academy of Music and Dramatic Art =

Drama school in Hammersmith, London

Coordinates: 51°29′26″N 0°12′57″W

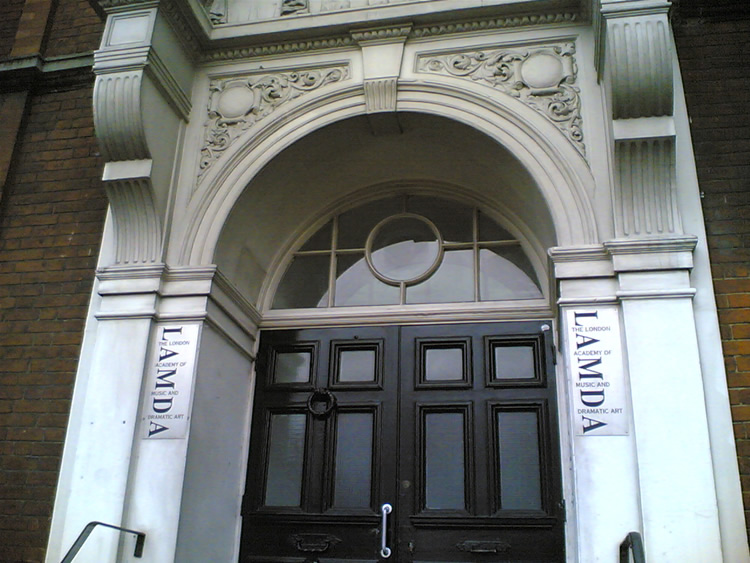
- The main entrance (from Talgarth Road) to LAMDA
- Patron: Princess Alexandra of Kent
- Type: Drama school
- Established: 1861
- Affiliations: Conservatoires UK
- Chair: Nigel Carrington
- President: Benedict Cumberbatch
- Vice-president: Patricia Hodge
- Principal: Mark O'Thomas
- Location: Hammersmith, London, England
- Website: lamda.ac.uk

The London Academy of Music and Dramatic Art (LAMDA) is a drama school located in Hammersmith, London. Founded in 1861, it is the oldest specialist drama school in the British Isles and was a founding member of the Federation of Drama Schools. In January 2025 the school expanded to New York City through a partnership with A.R.T. New York in Manhattan to provide studio training to actors in the US. LAMDA was ranked as the No. 1 drama school in the UK by The Guardian University Guide in 2025.

The academy's graduates work regularly in film and television as well as on stage at the Royal National Theatre, the Royal Shakespeare Company, Shakespeare's Globe, Oregon Shakespeare Festival, and the theatres of the West End, Los Angeles, and Broadway. It is registered as a company under the name LAMDA Ltd and as a charity under its trading name London Academy of Music and Dramatic Art. There is an associate organisation in America under the name of American Friends of LAMDA (AFLAMDA). A very high proportion of LAMDA's stage management and technical theatre graduates find work in their chosen field within weeks of graduation. LAMDA alumni have received 5 Academy Awards (out of 13 Oscar nominations), 10 Actor Awards, 14 Tonys, 15 Emmys, 19 Golden Globes, 21 BAFTAs, and 40 Olivier Awards.

LAMDA has a long-established partnership with the Fulbright Program. Each year one U.S. applicant is awarded a Fulbright Scholarship by the US/UK Fulbright Commission to study for a Master of Arts in Classical Acting at the school. LAMDA Examinations in the fields of speech, drama, musical theatre, communication, and performance are taken by external students and are recognised by Ofqual, the regulator in England, and its counterparts in Wales and Northern Ireland. LAMDA-accredited examinations at Level 3 or above are recognised within the UCAS Tariff system. LAMDA's Principal is Professor Mark O'Thomas, who succeeded Director Sarah Frankcom in 2022. Benedict Cumberbatch succeeded Timothy West as President of LAMDA's board of trustees in 2018.

== History ==
The London Academy of Music was established by Henry Wylde in 1861 in St. James's Hall; there were separate sections for men and women. Teaching began on 15 November 1861, at which time the cost per annum was 15 guineas, or £15 15s 0d. Students of all ages "with a decided talent, or showing an aptitude for learning" were admitted. Full scholarships were available. The first philharmonic concert was held on 29 April 1863, following a public rehearsal on 25 April. It was a performance of Mendelssohn's Symphony No. 3.

Providing training for, and examinations in, various musical disciplines was originally the dominant purpose of the institution. However, providing instruction in spoken English quickly became a core area of the academy's work.

In the 1880s, LAMDA began offering speech examinations to the public. Since then, these examinations have been refined and developed into a comprehensive system of performance evaluation. LAMDA Examinations has emerged as the largest Speech and Drama Board in the United Kingdom.

In 1904, the school was amalgamated with two other London music institutions that had sprung up since the academy was founded, namely the London Music School (founded 1865) and the Forest Gate School of Music (founded 1885) renamed in 1906 the Metropolitan Academy of Music. (The Metropolitan Academy of Music severed its links with the London Academy of Music in 1907.) Henry Yorke Trotter, who had been the sole proprietor of the London Music School since 1897, became Principal of the Academy of Music from 1904 until his death 30 years later.

In due course the Hampstead Academy was also amalgamated. The name was changed to the current name in 1935, under the direction of Wilfrid Foulis. In 1939, it was moved from London due to the war; when it reopened in 1945, it no longer provided musical training. However, singing has remained integral to LAMDA's actor training and in 2023 it introduced a new MFA Musical Theatre programme.

LAMDA was previously an associate member of the Conservatoire for Dance and Drama, having joined in 2004, and received funding through the Conservatoire from the Office for Students. It left the Conservatoire on 31 July 2019 to become an independent institution, and now receives funding directly from the Office for Students and Research England. LAMDA is a member of Conservatoires UK - an elite group of drama and music schools in the United Kingdom.

In August 2021 it was announced that Sarah Frankcom would step down as Director, and that LAMDA was conducting a search for a successor. In August 2022, LAMDA announced that Professor Mark O'Thomas had been unanimously appointed by the board of trustees as principal and chief executive, with Dr. Philippa Strandberg-Long appointed as head of actor training.

In February 2026, LAMDA was granted indefinite degree awarding powers by the Office for Students.

== Education and training ==
LAMDA provides vocational and academic training in the performing arts, with programmes covering acting, musical theatre, directing, and production and technical arts. Its training combines practical, vocational teaching with academic study and work on live and screen productions.

=== Undergraduate programmes ===
LAMDA offers undergraduate training including the BA (Hons) Professional Acting and BA (Hons) Production and Technical Arts: Stage and Screen.

The BA (Hons) Production and Technical Arts: Stage and Screen is a three-year vocational course preparing students for work in theatre, film, television and related areas of the creative industries. Students work on live productions from their first year and receive training in stage management, scenic construction, lighting and sound. In later years, students can specialise in areas including production management, lighting design, sound design, production sound, scenic construction and screen and digital production. The course also includes periods of professional work-based learning.

LAMDA also offers the Foundation in Stage and Screen: CertHE. The six-month course provides foundational training in acting, voice, movement and singing alongside production arts and screen work. It can be undertaken as preparation for further study or as a standalone course.

=== Postgraduate programmes ===
Postgraduate programmes include the MFA Professional Acting, MFA Musical Theatre, MA Classical Acting for the Professional Theatre and MA Directing. The programmes combine specialist practical training with academic study and performance or production work.

=== Production and Technical Arts ===
LAMDA's Production and Technical Arts programme was established in 1965 to provide professional training for stage managers and theatre technicians. The programme was conceived by lighting designer Richard Pilbrow and established in conjunction with Theatre Projects. Pilbrow enlisted the sound designer David Collison and stage manager Robert Stanton to help develop the syllabus, with Stanton becoming the course's first course director.

The programme was originally vocational in character and led to a LAMDA Diploma. It subsequently developed higher-education qualifications, beginning with a Diploma in Higher Education. In 2014 the course was revalidated by the University of Kent as a Foundation Degree with an optional BA (Hons) top-up, and in 2022 it became a three-year BA (Hons) in Production and Technical Arts – Stage and Screen.

The current programme provides practical training in stage management, scenic construction, lighting and sound, with students able to specialise in areas including production management, lighting design, sound design, production sound, scenic construction and screen and digital production. Students work on LAMDA's live and screen productions alongside actors and other practitioners, and undertake periods of professional work-based learning.

The programme celebrated its 60th anniversary in 2025. An anniversary event at LAMDA was attended by 115 alumni representing every decade of the programme's history.

=== Short courses and other training ===
In addition to its full-time degree and certificate programmes, LAMDA offers short courses covering areas including acting, musical theatre, Shakespeare, screen acting, audio performance, motion capture and audition preparation. Its short courses range from introductory and mixed-level programmes to courses aimed at experienced professional actors.

Some of LAMDA's short courses focus specifically on Shakespeare and classical actor training. Its Shakespeare Summer School, which has been running for more than 45 years, includes acting, voice, singing, movement and combat training alongside work on Shakespearean texts.

LAMDA's training also incorporates contemporary screen and digital production technologies. Its Production and Technical Arts programme includes screen and digital production, while its wider short-course programme includes motion capture and audio performance.

== Facilities ==
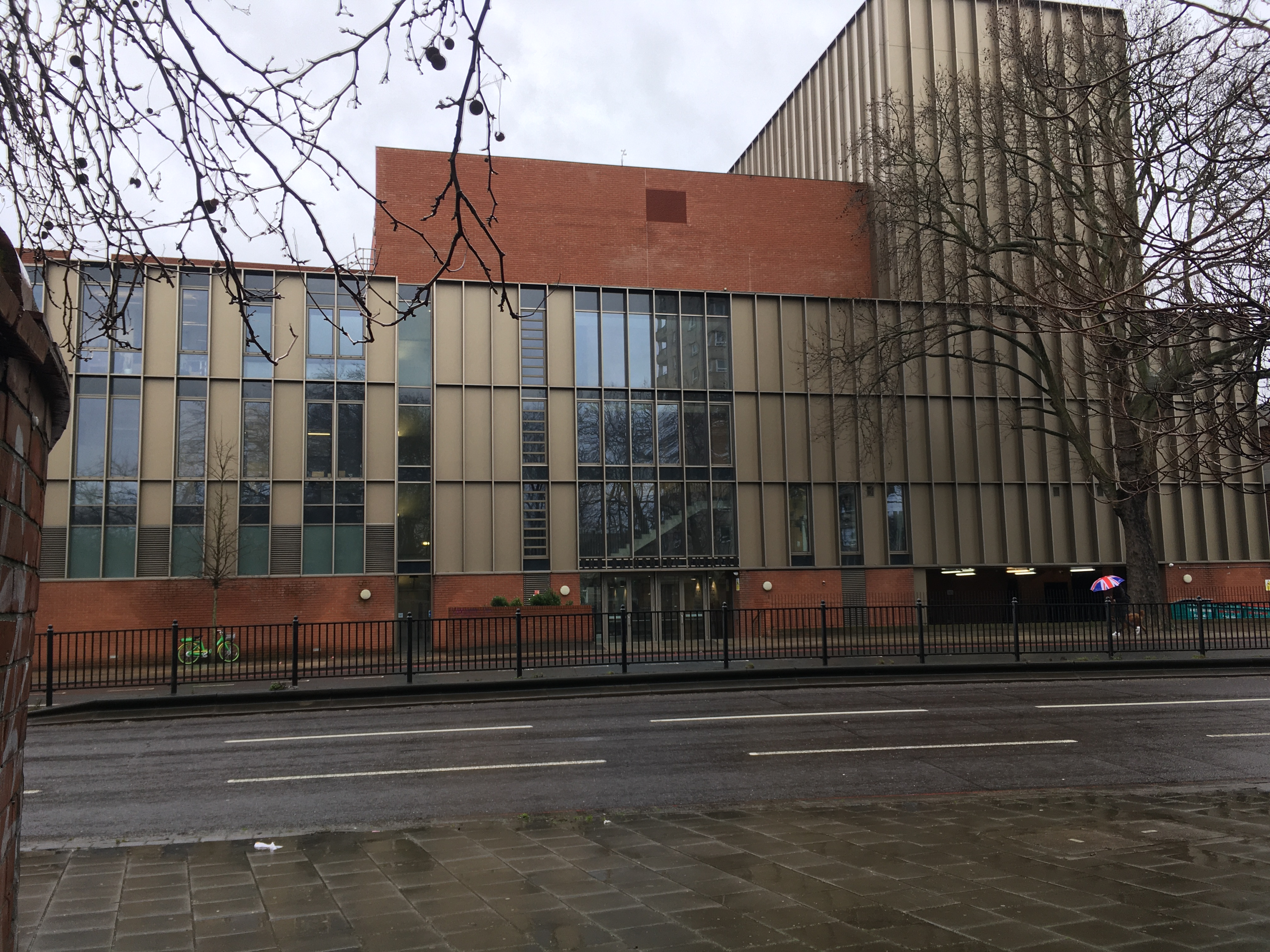
The LAMDA building on Talgarth Road

In 2003, LAMDA decided to move its teaching school and theatre to its current location in Hammersmith in West London. It acquired the old premises of the Royal Ballet School on Talgarth Road.

The move to the Talgarth Road enabled LAMDA to develop a campus with new training facilities designed by Niall McLaughlin Architects. The site was previously home to the Royal Ballet School, which moved to new, purpose-built facilities adjacent to the Royal Opera House.

The LAMDA complex has three theatres and various rehearsal spaces and meeting rooms. The three theatres are the Sainsbury Theatre, the Carne Studio Theatre and the Linbury Studio.

=== Theatres ===
The campus contains three theatres used for student training, productions and public performances.

The Sainsbury Theatre is the largest of the three, seating up to 220 people. It has a full-height fly tower and hosts large-scale productions.

The Carne Studio Theatre and the Linbury Theatre are flexible black-box performance spaces, seating 120 and 90 people respectively. They are used for experimentation and intimate performance work.

=== Rehearsal and teaching spaces ===
The campus contains fourteen dedicated rehearsal studios designed for acting, movement, voice, dance and stage combat training.

=== Production facilities ===
LAMDA's production facilities include workshops for scenic construction, prop-making, lighting and electronics, alongside a full-height fly tower in the Sainsbury Theatre. The facilities provide students with hands-on experience of live production environments.

=== Screen and audio facilities ===
The campus includes professional sound booths and recording studios used for voiceover work, radio drama, narration, podcasts and digital storytelling. Editing facilities support work including short films and professional showreels.

LAMDA also has an LED Volume virtual production studio and a motion capture studio. The LED Volume allows environments to be created and filmed in real time, while the motion capture studio is used for performance capture for film, television and video games.

The development of LAMDA's screen and technical infrastructure has been supported by an investment of almost £2 million in facilities.

=== Library ===
LAMDA's library contains an extensive collection of plays, scripts and research resources supporting creative practice and academic study.

== Boards and Honorary Fellows ==
- Patron: Princess Alexandra, The Honourable Lady Ogilvy

=== Board of trustees ===
- President: Benedict Cumberbatch
- Vice-president: Patricia Hodge
- Chairman: Sir Nigel Carrington
- Vice Chair: Tom Chandos, Dame Shirley Pearce
- Other Board members: Shamez Alibhai, David Roper, Professor Naren Barfield, Mohammad Dastbaz, Frances Corner, Nese Guner, Joanne Hirst, Nathan Richardson, Thomas Laing-Baker, Michelle Daisley, Leah Harvey, Rory Kinnear, Dame Shirley Pearce, Helen Wright
- Staff Trustee: George Ryan

=== Honorary Fellows ===
- Norman Ayrton
- Zoë Dominic
- Michael Forrest
