= Baron Dynham =

Extinct barony in the Peerage of England

Arms of Dynham: Gules, four fusils in fess ermine

Baron Dynham (alias Dinham, Dinaunt and Dinan) is a title which has been used twice in the English peerage, for:

- Oliver de Dynham, 1st Baron Dynham (c.1234-1299), of Hartland and Nutwell in Devon and feudal baron of Cardinham in Cornwall. He was summoned by writ of King Edward I to attend parliaments from 24 June 1295 to 26 August 1296, the writs being addressed to Olivero de Dynham or Dynaunt, by which he is held to have become Baron Dynham. The barony was not apparently hereditary, as determined in 1914 by the House of Lords Committee for Privileges concerning a claim to it made by the Viscount Gage and Sir Robert Bourchier Sherard Wrey, Baronet. "[A]ny hereditary barony, that may be supposed to have been created by the writ of 1295, is in abeyance" among the representatives of the sisters of the baron who died in 1401. No writ of summons was ever issued to his descendants for five generations until 1467, when a new peerage was created.
- John Dynham, 1st Baron Dynham (c.1434-1501), summoned by writs of Kings Edward IV and Henry VII to attend parliaments from 28 February 1467 to 16 January 1497, the writs being addressed to Johanni Dynham de Care Dynham (i.e. Cardinham), by which he is held to have become Baron Dynham. The title became extinct following his death in 1501 without male progeny.

Note: Leigh Raymant's website on The Peerages of England, Scotland, Ireland, Great Britain and the United Kingdom, shows this barony as Dinan and lists Oliver as the 1st Baron Dinan, and John Dinan KG as the 7th and last Baron Dinan, apparently treating the intervening peerages as hereditary without individual summons.
