= Norwich High School for Girls =

Private school in Norwich, England

- Norwich, Norfolk, NR2 2HU; United Kingdom

Information
- Type: Private school day school
- Motto: Do thy best and rejoice with those who do better
- Established: 1875
- Founder: Girls Public Day School Company
- Chairman of Governors: Jo Boyd
- Head Mistress: Alison Sefton
- Gender: Girls only
- Age: 3 to 18
- Enrolment: 700
- Language: English
- Houses: 6
- Colours: Red, blue, white
- Website: http://www.norwichhigh.gdst.net/

Norwich High School for Girls is a private day school for girls aged 3 to 18 in Norwich, England. The school was founded in 1875 by the Girls’ Public Day School Company (now the Girls' Day School Trust), which aimed to establish schools for girls of all classes by providing a high standard of academic, moral and religious education. The school is a member of the Girls’ Schools Association and the Headmasters’ and Headmistresses’ Conference. The school consistently has one of the best academic results in East Anglia.

Entry into the school is selective at 4+, 7+, 11+, 13+ and 16+.

== History and location ==
Norwich High School for Girls was founded in 1875 as the first GPDST school outside London. Originally situated at the Assembly House, Norwich, the school moved to its present location Eaton Grove, 95 Newmarket Road in 1933. Eaton Grove is Grade II listed. The school occupies several buildings, all of which were originally private houses; Stafford House (preparatory school), Eaton Grove (senior school) and Lanchester House (sixth form).

== Year naming ==
Norwich High School uses its own nomenclature for the year groups.

Stafford House

- Nursery (ages 3–4)
- Reception (ages 4–5)
- Kindergarten (aged 5–6)
- Lower I (ages 6–7)
- Upper I (ages 7–8)
- Lower II (ages 8–9)
- Upper II (ages 9–10)
- Lower III (ages 10–11)

Eaton Grove

- Upper III (ages 11–12)
- Lower IV (ages 12–13)
- Upper IV (ages 13–14)
- Lower V (ages 14–15)
- Upper V (ages 15–16)

Lanchester House

- Lower VI - Sixth Form (ages 16–17)
- Upper VI - Sixth Form (ages 17–18)

== School Life ==
In Upper III (Year 7) and below all pupils study a broad curriculum including Latin and two modern languages. Pupils are required to take at least nine General Certificate of Secondary Education (GCSE) and IGCSE subjects in Lower V (Year 10) and Upper V (Year 11). In the sixth form, pupils usually study four or five AS-Level subjects for one year and most continue with three subjects to A-Level. Many students take the Extended Project Qualification (EPQ). In total, there are 24 subjects offered at A-Level. Academically, the school is one of the highest performing independent schools in East Anglia.

== Facilities ==
The school's facilities include a sports hall, performing arts studio, main hall (including stage), junior school hall, rowing gym, outdoor theatre, lecture theatre, boardroom, 25-metre swimming pool, 13 acres of playing fields, fitness suite, 8 tennis courts and 1 astro turf.

== Notable former pupils ==
Academia

- Prof Jane Shaw (born 1963) – Principal of Harris Manchester College, Oxford, Professor of the History of Religion, and Pro-Vice Chancellor at University of Oxford
- Joyce Lambert (1916–2005) – botanist
- Dr Jennifer Moyle - scientist
- Dame Prof Shirley Pearce (born 1954) – former Vice-Chancellor of Loughborough University and former professor at University of East Anglia

Literature

- Pat Barr (writer) (1934–2018) - author
- Raffaella Barker (born 1964) - author and journalist
- Nina Bawden (1925–2012) – novelist and writer of children's books
- Jane Hissey (born 1952) – illustrator and author
- Stella Tillyard (born 1957) - author

Music

- Diana Burrell (born 1948) – composer
- Jane Manning (1938–2021) – opera singer
- Elizabeth Watts (born 1979) - soprano

Media

- Becky Mantin (born 1980) – television presenter
- Anne Weale (born 1929) - novelist and reporter

Performing Arts

- Olivia Colman (born 1974) – actress
- Hannah Waterman (born 1975) – actress

Politics

- Dorothy Jewson (1884–1964) – Labour politician
- Alice Walpole (born 1963) - United Nations Assistant Secretary General

Sports

- Sophie Hemming (born 1980) - England rugby union player
- Emma Pooley (born 1982) – cyclist who won a silver medal at the 2008 Summer Olympics
- Victoria Williamson (born 1993) – track cyclist

World War One

- Edith Cavell (born 1865) – nurse, executed by Germans in 1915

== Headteachers ==
- Miss Ada Benson (1875)
- Miss Wills (from 1875)
- Miss A. M. Tapson (early 1880s)
- Miss Lizzie Gadesden (1884 to 1907, previously head of Newton Abbot High School, died 1918)
- Miss Gertrude Mary Wise JP (1907 to 1928, previously head of Shrewsbury High School, died January 1935)
- Miss Elsie Pringle Jameson (1928 to 1946, born 1880, died 1958)
- Miss Prunella Riviere Bodington (1946 to 1953, later head of South Hampstead High School, born 1907, died 1984)
- Miss Dorothy Bartholomew (to December 1976, died September 2011)
- Miss Rhoda H. M. Standeven (January 1976 to September 1985)
- Mrs Valerie Bidwell (from September 1985 to July 2010)
- Mr Jason Morrow (First Male Headteacher; September 2010 to 2015)
- Mrs Kirsty von Malaisé (from September 2015 to August 2020)
- Miss Alison Sefton (September 2020 to present)

== Controversy ==
In July 2017, Robin Malton, who taught at the school in 2000–2016, was given an indefinite prohibition order by the National College for Teaching and Leadership (NCTL) for sending inappropriate messages to young vulnerable students.

In 2021 the school faced an industrial dispute over plans to withdraw from the Teacher's Pension Scheme. National Education Union members within the Girls Day School Trust balloted for strike action after an alleged “fire and rehire” ultimatum being out to staff. The GDST eventually agreed to allow current staff to remain in the Teachers Pension Scheme.
