= Diana Burrell =

English composer

- Born: 25 October 1948 (age 76); Norwich, England
- Occupations: Viola player; Composer
- Years active: 1980–present
- Era: Contemporary

Diana Elizabeth Jane Burrell (born 25 October 1948) is an English composer and viola player.

== Life and career ==
Burrell was born on 25 October 1948 in Norwich, England. Her parents were Bernard Burrell, a schoolteacher by profession who served as an assistant organist at the cathedral, and Audrey Burrell (née Coleman). She attended Norwich High School for Girls before receiving her bachelor's of arts degree in music at Girton College, Cambridge. She began her career as a viola player, but soon became well known for her compositions and became a full-time composer. One of her first compositions was for the 1980 St Endellion Music Festival. She used to attend as a viola player, but festival organizer Richard Hickox told her she "ought to write something for the festival. The result, Missa Sancte Endeliente, was a large-scale mass using Cornish and Latin texts.

Her first major orchestral piece was titled Landscape (1988). It describes the wild, windswept countryside. It was one of the winners of the "Encore" awards organised by the Royal Philharmonic Society and BBC Radio 3. Another notable orchestral work was Das Meer, das so groß und weit ist, da wimmelt's ohne Zahl, große und kleine Tiere ("The Sea is so big and wide and swarming with numerous little animals"). It describes the sounds and the atmosphere of the sea.

Burrell has written other orchestral works including concertos for viola, flute and clarinet, an opera The Albatross (1997), many choral works and chamber music. She likes modern architecture and her music sometimes shows this in the way it is shaped. She has also written music for young people, such as Lights and Shadows (1989) which includes a children's choir, a recorder group and much percussion.

She teaches at the Guildhall School of Music and Drama and became the Artistic Director of Spitalfields Festival in London in 2006, taking over from Jonathan Dove. In 2006, she was awarded a fellowship from the Arts and Humanities Research Council at the Royal Academy of Music, to compose a major series of ensemble organ works over five years. She lives in Harwich, Essex.

== Selected works ==
=== Orchestra ===
- Concerto
- Gate (string orchestra)
- Landscape (1988)
- Das Meer, das so gross und weit ist, da wimmelt's ohne Zahl grosse und kleine Tiere
- Symphonies of Flocks, Herds, and Shoals

=== Concertante ===
- Clarinet Concerto (1996)
- Flute Concerto (1997)
- Viola Concerto “...calling, leaping, crying, dancing...” (1994)

=== Opera ===
- The Albatross (1987; premiered at Trinity College of Music, 1997)

=== Choir ===
- Alleluia (SATB choir)
- Ave Verum Corpus (SATB choir)
- Benedicam Dominum (SSATB and organ)
- Come and See/Christ Child (piano and unison voice)
- Creator/Stars of Night (SATB choir, English Horn, Organ Pedals)
- Hymn to Wisdom (SATB choir)
- Magnificat/Nunc (for treble voices and piano)
- Michael's Mass (for unison voice and piano)
- Missa Sancte Endeliente (1980)
- Heil’ger Geist in’s Himmels Throne (1993, SATB choir, organ and percussion)

=== Other ===
- Arched Forms with Bells (for organ)
- Aria (for violin)
- Barrow
- Festival (for organ)
- Gold (for piano and brass, also for piano solo)
- Gulls and Angels (1983, string quartet)
- Heron (for cello and piano)
- King Shall Bright (for soprano, oboe, French horn, violin, and harp)
- North Star (for trumpet and organ)
- Songs for Harvey (for violin solo or viola solo) (1988)
