= Welltown =

Hamlet in Cornwall, England

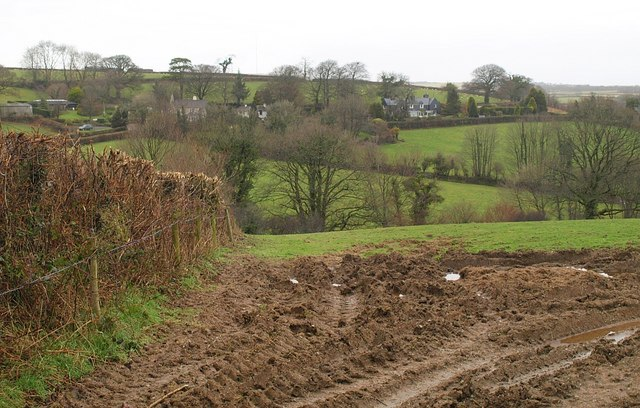
A view towards Welltown near Liskeard

Welltown is a hamlet in the parish of Cardinham in Cornwall, England, United Kingdom.

Welltown is also a hamlet near Liskeard.
