= London Organ School and College of Music =

London music school that merged with London Academy of Music and Dramatic Art

Coordinates: 51.5148°N 0.1426°W

The London Organ School and College of Music was a music school established in 1865 by Frederick Scotson Clark. It later merged with other schools to become the London Academy of Music and Dramatic Art.

== History ==
The school was established in 1865 by Frederick Scotson Clark (1840–83), based at 3 Princes Street, Cavendish Square, London. At Scotson's death, the management of the school was taken on by his brother Henry.

In 1884, the school was described as having about 300 students under instruction: the fees being 21. 2s. per course of 12 lessons. Pupils are admitted at any age, and can join at any time.

In 1887, the management of the school passed to Dr Yorke Trotter (1854–1934).

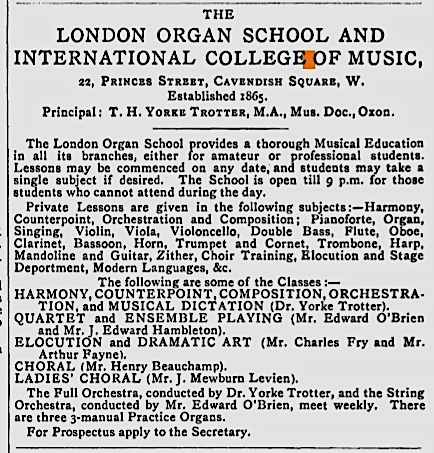
London Organ School and International College of Music advertisement (1900)

By May 1900, the school was known as the London Organ School and International College of Music.

In March 1903, the school changed its name to the London Music School.

In 1904, the school joined with other London schools of music and of drama under the aegis of the London Academy of Music (established 1861), the whole eventually becoming in 1935 the London Academy of Music and Dramatic Art (LAMDA).

== Resources ==
In May 1900, the school was advertising that it owned three three-manual practice organs.

In about 1900, a four-manual organ was built for the school by Thomas Casson (1842–1910). It was considered unusual for having a 32' stop - a 'Dolce' (to middle C) on the Great division. This instrument was moved to the Shaftesbury Cinema, Portsmouth, in 1921.

About 1906, a two-manual organ from the school was transferred to St Barnabas church, Manor Park, in east London.

== Notable events ==
- 1883, 21 June. "Soloists, chorus and orchestra [...] provided by the London Organ School" gave the first performance - in London's St George's Hall - of Manfred: Dramatic Poem with Music in Three Parts by Robert Schumann (1810–58).
- 1900, 20 June. The first performance in England "as intended by the composer" of Mendelssohn's Atahalie, given in London's St George's Hall by"the pupils and orchestra of the London Organ School under the direction of Dr Yorke Trotter.".

== Teachers ==
- Adolphus Antoine
- Henry Beauchamp
- Edward O'Brien
- Henry Clarke.
- Frederick Scotson Clark (1840–1883)
- Emily Edroff (1867-1953)
- Charles Fry
- George Marshall-Hall (1862–1915)
- J. Edward Hambleton
- J. Mewburn Levien
- Arthur Payne
- Yorke Trotter (1854–1934)

== Pupils ==
- Emily Edroff (1867–1953)
- Alexander M. Gifford
- Andrew de Ternant
- York Trotter (1854–1934)
