= Becky Mantin =

British weather presenter

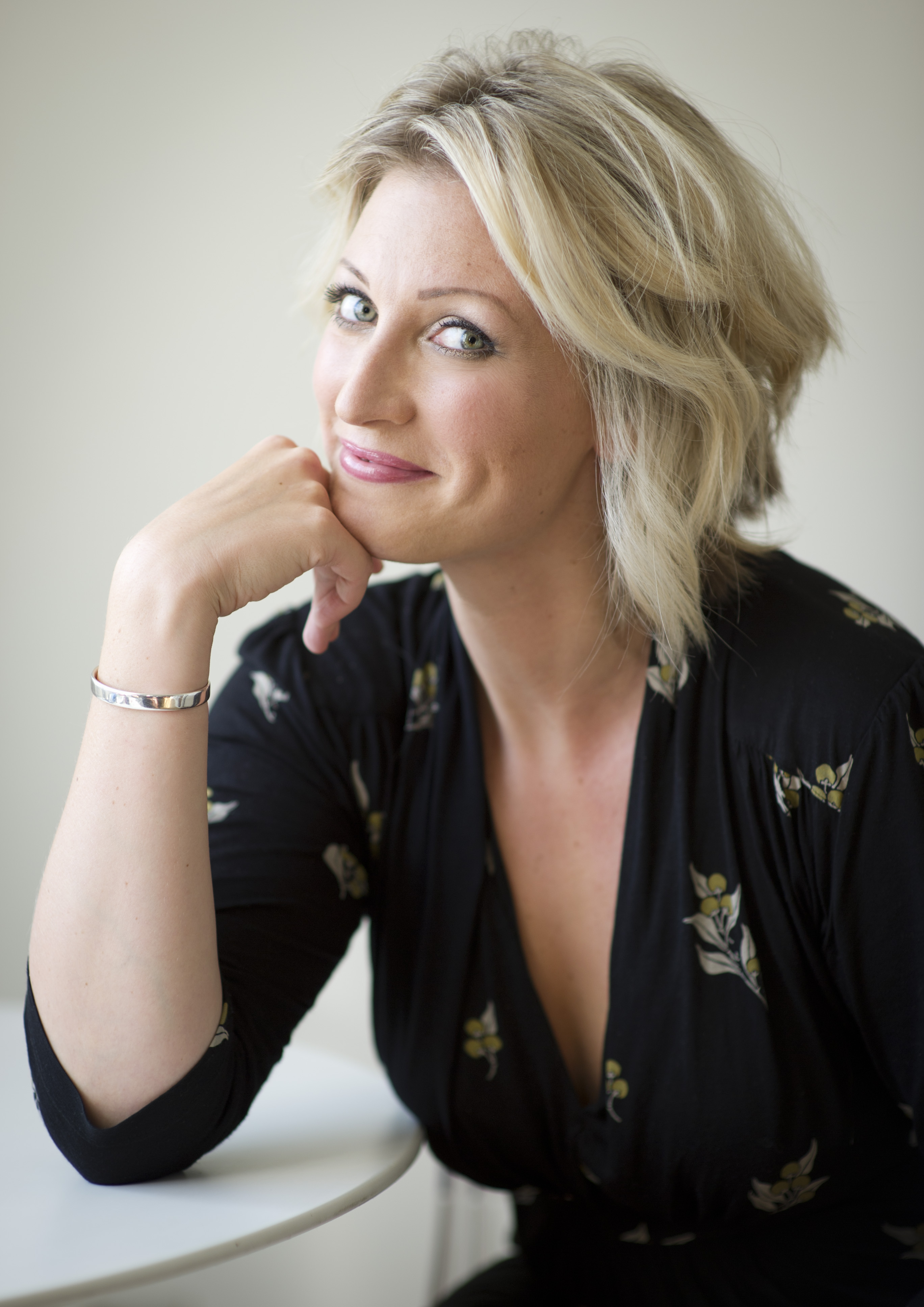
- Born: 18 October 1980 (age 45); Norwich, Norfolk, England
- Occupations: Weather presenter, TV presenter
- Spouse: Jack Heald (m. 2009)
- Children: 4

Rebecca Mantin (born 18 October 1980 in Norwich, Norfolk) is an English TV presenter and weather presenter and forecaster for ITV Weather.

== Early life ==
Born to Wendy and Richard Mantin, Mantin grew up in the south Norfolk village of Saxlingham Nethergate and attended Norwich High School for Girls and the Sixth Form at Norwich School.

== Career ==
Mantin started her media career writing for the Eastern Daily Press and appearing on the commercial radio station Broadland 102. She then moved to ITV Anglia, initially as a fashion presenter for lunchtime magazine show Home Malone before taking meteorological training to become the ITV News Anglia lead weather presenter, later presenting and reporting on regional programmes including the consumer show Late Night Checkout and animal rescue series 'Animal Tales'.

Mantin then started to appear on the national channels ITV Weather, Channel 5 and Sky as a reporter. From 25 February 2005, she ceased duties with ITV News Anglia and joined ITV Weather on a permanent basis. She also co-presented ITV's This Morning Summer with Denise van Outen and Richard Bacon in summer 2005 to celebrate 50 years of ITV.

Mantin has appeared as a weather presenter on Good Morning Britain on ITV Breakfast.

On 2 April 2019, she presented the factual programme Inside Britain's Storms on ITV.

== Personal life ==
Mantin married former yachtsman turned professional rugby coach Jack Heald in Walberswick on 12 December 2009. She has four children.

Mantin sustained a concussion and memory loss in a surfing accident on 7 June 2007 in Cornwall. She returned to full-time presenting early in 2008.
