= Richard Fitz Turold =

Anglo-Norman landowner

Richard Fitz Turold (died after 1103–06) (alias fitzThorold, fitzTurolf) was an eleventh-century Anglo-Norman landowner in Cornwall and Devon, mentioned in the Domesday Book. In the 13th century his estates formed part of the Feudal barony of Cardinham, Cornwall, and in 1166 as recorded in the Cartae Baronum his estates had been held as a separate fiefdom from Reginald, Earl of Cornwall.

== Origins ==
As the prefix fitz in his surname suggests he was presumably the son of Turold/Thorold/Turolf. A certain "Turulf", presumably his father, witnessed a charter to the monastery of Mont Saint-Michel in Normandy, to which same monastery Richard also granted lands.

== Landholdings ==
=== Cornwall ===
==== Tenant of Count of Mortain ====
He had a castle at Cardinham in Cornwall, in which county he was a major tenant and steward of Robert of Mortain, Count of Mortain, half-brother of King William the Conqueror. In 1086 he was Lord (who paid tax to the tenant-in-chief) of 64 settlements, mainly in Cornwall, but also in Devon and Somerset. His holdings in Cornwall included the manor of Penhallam.

=== Devon ===
==== Tenant-in-chief ====
His entry in the Devonshire section of the Domesday Book lists Ricardus filius Turoldus as a tenant-in-chief of the king and holding four properties:

- Woodhuish, Brixham parish, Haytor hundred
- Natsworthy, Widecombe-in-the-Moor parish, Haytor hundred
- East Allington, in Stanborough hundred
- One house in the City of Exeter

==== Mesne tenant ====
- St Marychurch in the parish of Haytor hundred, held from the Count of Mortain.
- Martin in Drewsteignton parish, Wonford hundred, held from Baldwin de Moeles, Sheriff of Devon

== Progeny ==
His son was William Fitz Richard of Cardinham, mentioned in deeds in 1110 and 1130, date of death unknown. It has been suggested that William's daughter and heiress became the wife of Reginald, Earl of Cornwall.
