= Michael Head (composer) =

British composer, pianist, organist and singer (1900–1976)

Michael Head, FRAM (28 January 1900 – 24 August 1976) was an English composer, pianist, organist and singer who left some enduring works still popular today. He was noted for his association with the Royal Academy of Music. His compositional oeuvre mainly consists of songs, as well as choral works and few larger-scale pieces such as a piano concerto.

== Early life ==
Michael Dewar Head was born in Eastbourne, East Sussex, on 28 January 1900. His father was a barrister and journalist and his mother an accomplished amateur singer and pianist. His mother's influence evidently dominated, and at age 10 he commenced his musical training, taking lessons in piano with Jean Adair and in singing with Fritz Marston at the Adair-Marston School of Music. He was educated at Monkton Combe School in Somerset.

Head began to study at the Royal Academy of Music but was soon called up for service in the First World War. While working at an ammunition factory, he composed the song cycle Over the rim of the moon (Head et al., 1920). This was to become his first published work.

After the war, Head resumed his studies at the academy. He studied composition with Frederick Corder, piano with T B Knott and organ with Reginald Steggall. He won a scholarship for composition. He also won other awards for composition, sight singing and harmony. In 1924, Head was made an Associate of the academy.

== Career ==
In 1926 Head took up a post at Bedales School, Petersfield, where he taught for three years.

Head gave his first public recital as a self accompanied singer at Wigmore Hall in 1929. After this debut performance, his fame grew rapidly. He gave several more recitals in the British Isles and in many parts of the world. Additionally he gave several radio recitals, both in Britain and Canada. He took up the post of Pianoforte Professor at the Royal Academy in 1927 after an invitation by Sir John McEwen. This post he was to hold until his retirement in 1975.

Head was appointed an examiner for the Associated Board of the Royal Schools of Music and as such toured many countries, including Barbados, South Africa and Rhodesia (now Zimbabwe). At the outbreak of World War II, he returned to London and continued teaching throughout the blitz. During this time, he gave hundreds of concerts in factories and in small towns.

== Death ==
Head died in Cape Town on 24 August 1976, from a sudden and unexpected illness, while examining for the Associated Board in Rhodesia and South Africa.

== Works ==
Most of Head's works are songs, but his early works include a Piano Concerto (performed by soloist Maurice Cole at the Bath Festival in 1930), a tone poem, and Scherzo for Orchestra. By the River in Spring (1950) is a substantial piece for flute and piano.

His best known song cycles are Over the Rim of the Moon (1918–19) and Songs of the Countryside (1921–23). The first of these contains probably his most famous song, "The Ships of Arcady". All the texts in this song cycle were by the Irish war poet Francis Ledwidge, who was killed in action during World War I on 31 July 1917. Songs of the Countryside uses poems by various poets. The first song, "Sweet Chance, That Led My Steps Abroad" was a setting of W. H. Davies's 1914 poem "A Great Time". "The Piper" is a setting of Seumas O'Sullivan's famous poem of the same name. One of his popular songs is the Christmas carol The Little Road to Bethlehem, the words of which are by Margaret Rose. Other famous songs include "Money, O!" and "Why have you stolen my delight?" (see Bush, 1982).
