= Edmund John Glynn =

Edmund John Glynn (1764–1840) was a soldier, landowner, politician, banker and High Sheriff of Cornwall in 1799.

== Early life ==
Edmund John Glynn was the eldest child of John Glynn of Glynn, Cornwall and Susanna Margaret Oglander of the Isle of Wight. His father was a prominent lawyer in London and a leading supporter of John Wilkes. Edmund John Glynn joined the army as an ensign in the 25th Regiment of Foot in 1780 and left in 1785, marrying Elizabeth Meux Worsley of the Isle of Wight in 1790. His wife died in 1797, leaving three surviving daughters from the marriage.

== Soldier and landowner ==
Glynn either inherited or acquired an interest in large landed estates in Cornwall, Devon and the Isle of Wight and he set about re-establishing his family's presence at their ancestral home at Glynn in the parish of Cardinham near Bodmin. In 1793 he became a founder member and vice-president of the Cornwall Agricultural Society and subsequently sold land in Devon and bought properties around Bodmin to consolidate his estates there. By 1802 he had joined the Cornish militia as a major and second-in-command of the Royal Miners Regiment. From 1805 the regiment was permanently stationed in Kent where it was employed in building fortifications at Rochester, Chatham and Dover. Glynn was only able to return home on leave once a year and he left the reorganisation of his estates and the building of a new mansion at Glynn to his steward John Wallis, a Bodmin lawyer and banker. This arrangement ended in 1809 following a dispute and Glynn then gave up his commission in the militia and returned to Cornwall.

== Politician and banker ==
On his return Glynn immediately became a leading member of a Cornish political party dedicated to stamping out political corruption and supporting the reform of parliament. He campaigned for the political principles of his father, promoting the rights of the individual against the state and the freedom of the press. In 1810 the party founded its own newspaper, The West Briton, and Glynn is thought to have been one of its original owners. He put his business affairs in the hands of Adam Thomson, a Scotsman who he had initially brought to Cornwall to manage the farms on the Glynn estate. In 1811 Glynn and Thomson were among the partners at the foundation of the North Cornwall Bank which had its main office at Bodmin. The bank served the local agricultural community and it encountered severe difficulties at the end of the Napoleonic Wars in 1815 when food prices and farm rents fell. By 1818 Glynn and Thomson were its only remaining active partners and while Glynn kept the bank in business by injecting his own money he left its management entirely to Thomson.

Thomson used the funds of the North Cornwall Bank to further his own business interests and his enemies deliberately undermined confidence in its banknotes. There was a run on the bank and it failed in 1819 leaving a large amount owing to its London agents. As a partner Glynn was liable for its debts and during the subsequent litigation he was committed to the King's Bench debtors' prison in January 1823. He was released shortly before being declared bankrupt in November that year. In 1826 it was estimated that he had liabilities of £110,000 including money owed to his daughters. The money raised from the eventual sale of his heavily mortgaged estates was insufficient to fully repay these debts.

== Later life ==
Glynn's involvement in public life seems to have ceased after his bankruptcy and he died aged 77 at the London home of his daughter Frances Prideaux-Brune on 24 July 1840.
