= Yorke Trotter =

English organist, writer and music teacher

Thomas Henry Yorke Trotter (6 November 1854 – 11 March 1934) was an organist, musical author and teacher who for 29 years was principal of the Incorporated London Academy of Music.

Trotter was born in Great Stainton and educated at Durham School. He went on to study at New College, Oxford, where he read classics and law. He also studied organ and composition with Francis Edward Gladstone and Sir Frederick Bridge, taking his BA in 1879, MA in 1887 and Music.Doc, in 1892.

Early in his career Trotter conducted the first performance in Britain of Robert Schumann's Manfred in 1899 and Felix Mendelssohn's incidental music for Athalie in 1900. In his early days he was also a composer, though most of his music remained in manuscript.

For a time Trotter had studied at the London Organ School, where he later became professor of organ, pianoforte and harmony. By 1897 he was sole proprietor, changing its name to the London Music School. Amalgamated with other music schools this became the London Academy of Music in 1904.

During his 30 years at the academy he devised a systematic method of teaching, emphasising ear-training and incorporating elements of philosophy and psychology. He set out his ideas in a series of text books, including Constructive Harmony: Together With a Book on Form (1911, rev. 1915), The Making of Musicians (1914), The Rhythmic Method of Music Teaching (1923, in which he made the case that the beginning of musical understanding was a child's innate sense of rhythm), Music and Mind (1924) and Principles of Musicianship for Teachers and Students (1933).

Through Trotter the academy obtained a grant from The London Council Council to teach the Rhythmic Method to London schoolchildren, starting in 1919. The method was subsequently adopted by the Eastman School of Music at Rochester, New York, and Trotter spent two years at the school establishing it.

He died in London, aged 79, and is buried at Christ Church Churchyard, Coldharbour in Surrey. He was married (in 1887) to Anna Charles Maitland-Makgill-Crichton Trotter (1858–1943).
