= Margaret Rose (lyricist) =

English lyricist

Margaret Rose Young, née Girdler (1888–1958) was a lyricist under the name Margaret Rose, remembered for the lyrics of The Little Road to Bethlehem. She was born on 10 November 1888 at Northampton, the daughter of John Arthur Girdler (1864–1929), later a Wesleyan minister and missionary in South Africa, and Carrie Amelia Girdler née Smith (1864–1905). In 1927 she married Francis Stuart Young (8 January 1867–30 July 1948), a musician and composer, and they settled in North Weald, Essex. The Little Road to Bethlehem, with music by Michael Head, was published in 1946. Her other works included lyrics for the operettas The Singing Wood, with music by her husband Stuart (c 1932, based on a story by Lilly Frazer, wife of Sir George Frazer, Alicia or The Magic Fishbone, with music by Thomas Dunhill (1938), and The Bells of Bruges, with music by John Longmire (1948).

She died in South Africa on 19 May 1958.

In 2005 copies of many of her and her husband's works and papers were deposited in the Essex Record Office.
