= Frederick Scotson Clark =

English organist and composer (1840–1883)

The Reverend Frederick Scotson Clark (Southwark, 16 November 1840 – London, 5 July 1883) was an English organist and composer. He was founder of the London Organ School and College of Music.

== Life ==
Frederick Scotson Clark's parents were an Irish-born merchant, Michael Clark (1810-1877) and his wife, born Adelaide (Adele) Cusack Kearney (1816-1899).

Clark had his early music education from his mother, who was a pupil of Chopin. He received some tuition in harmony from Eugène Sergent in Paris. He became organist at the Regent Square Presbyterian Church at the age of fourteen. He studied under E. J. Hopkins before entering the Royal College of Music, where he continued his studies under Sir William Sterndale Bennett and Sir John Goss. At the age of 18 he was teaching at the Royal Academy of Music. In 1865 he founded the London Organ School and College of Music at 3, Princes Street, Westminster W1, before going up to Exeter College, Oxford, where he was an organ scholar, graduating as Bachelor of Music in 1867. He was appointed headmaster of St. Michael's Grammar School, Brighton.

In 1868 he was ordained deacon and he became curate at St. Michael's Grammar School, Brighton. He married Catherine Eliza Brown - it turned out to be an unhappy marriage - and they moved to Leipzig, where he continued his musical studies under Reinecke and Richter and officiated at an English chapel there. The following year he moved alone to Stuttgart for more studies, and he was assistant chaplain of the Lutheran Church. He returned to London in 1873 and continued at the London Organ School and College of Music. He was chosen to represent English organists at the Paris Exposition of 1878, where he won a gold award.

Clark composed much organ music, church vocal music, songs, characteristic pieces for piano, and music for harmonium.

He had six children, four of whom survived. Kathleen Scotson Clark (1870-1959) became headmistress of Allerton High School in Leeds. His son, the artist George Frederick Scotson-Clark (1872-1927), used a hyphen to add his middle name to his surname.

During 1882, Clark became ill, and he eventually died on 5 July 1883 at 3, Princes Street, Westminster W1. He left a will and an estate valued for probate at £957. His brother Henry Clark, a professor of music living at the same address, was his executor.
