= Reginald Paul =

British musician

Reginald Paul, FRAM, (1894–1974), was a concert pianist, chamber music player, accompanist, organist and Professor at the Royal Academy of Music in London (1927-1960). His career spanned five decades, without counting his success in the early years of the 20th century as a child performer at concert halls around North Wales, where he and his brother, the organist Leslie Paul, grew up.

== Biography ==
After moving to London, Reginald Paul was an Ada Lewis scholar and a student of Tobias Matthay. During World War I, he served in the army as a volunteer with the County of London battalion. After the war, he resumed his studies with Percy Waller at the Royal Academy of Music, where he was a contemporary and friend, and later colleague, of the composers Alan Bush and Michael Head, who became godfather to one of his children . Alan Bush wrote later: “.. As a student at the Royal Academy of Music, I was, perhaps, the second best sight-reader in the building, the uncrowned king in this domain being my fellow-student, Reginald Paul ..”. His success at the RAM, where he won numerous prizes and medals, enabled him to quickly make a name for himself on the London concert circuit in the 1920s, with frequent performances as soloist or accompanist at the Wigmore Hall, the Aeolian Hall and other leading concert venues, as well as promenade concerts with Sir Henry Wood at the Queen's Hall, playing the Beethoven Emperor Concerto there on August 21, 1925, at the age of 31, and the Mozart E flat concerto a year later (August 19, 1926). After this performance of the Emperor, the Times critic wrote of him: “Mr Reginald Paul has proven that the qualities he has shown at recitals in the smaller halls bear being transferred to the larger field of the pianoforte concerto with orchestra. His reading was that of a thorough musician ..”(The Times, August 22, 1925). The Daily Telegraph critic was equally enthusiastic after a Wigmore Hall solo recital (October 23, 1925): “Some very flattering things have been said of Mr Reginald Paul's playing recently at a promenade concert, as of his recitals last year. Yesterday again at the Wigmore Hall he proved that the praise that has been given him is no more than he deserves..” (Daily Telegraph, October 24, 1925).

His performances at the Wigmore Hall and other leading concert halls in London continued over the next four decades, including recitals for the wartime National Gallery concert series and a recital at the new Royal Festival Hall in 1955, as well as many other venues throughout Britain. His career had too an international dimension, with a three-month tour of South Africa with the violinist Harold Fairhurst and the soprano Carrie Tubb (May 23 – September 22, 1924), and later tours of Norway, Switzerland, Yugoslavia, France and the Netherlands.

As an accompanist, Reginald Paul performed with many distinguished musicians of the day, including the singers Joan Muriella, Elsie Suddaby and Steuart Wilson, cellists Guilhermina Suggia and Maurice Eisenberg and violinists Bessie Rawlins and Eda Kersey. He also had a successful career as a chamber musician, playing with various trios and quartets, including the Stratton and the Griller string quartets, the Fairhurst Trio and the Reginald Paul Pianoforte Quartet, with violinist George Stratton, viola player Watson Forbes and cellist John Moore.

Reginald Paul's extensive repertoire included works by contemporary British composers, including William Walton, John Ireland, Vaughan Williams, Herbert Howells and Arnold Bax. John Ireland was particularly appreciative of Reginald Paul's playing of his works. He wrote to him in 1936: “.. I remember so well your really fine performance of my sonata, probably the best it has ever had ..”. And in 1953: “..You have a splendid technique as well as the true, sensitive musicianship always so evident in your playing. It is a very rare combination of qualities (..) Very few artists (..) seem really in sympathy with my music, as you so clearly are ..”. Arnold Bax dedicated his piece ‘Serpent Dance’ to Reginald Paul and often wrote to thank him for his performances : “I was delighted with your performance of my sonata this evening. Indeed, it could scarcely have been better ..”. Herbert Howells wrote of Paul's broadcast performance of his piano quartet in 1950: “.. I am most grateful to you and your colleagues for what seemed to us here a magnificent performance : and I feel very touched by your taking so much trouble over it ..”.

He featured in relatively few gramophone recordings. There are a 1939 Decca recording by the Reginald Paul Quartet of Walton's Piano Quartet and a BBC recording of the Saint-Saëns Piano Concerto No. 2, reissued on record in 2006 by Symposium. He was, however, a frequent performer in BBC broadcasts, in particular in the 1930s to 1950s, including the war years, when he continued to travel extensively to cover his broadcast engagements.
