= Chemiosmosis =

Electrochemical principle that enables cellular respiration

Chemiosmosis is the movement of ions across a semipermeable membrane through an integral membrane protein, down their electrochemical gradient. An important example is the formation of adenosine triphosphate (ATP) by the movement of hydrogen ions (H^{+}) through ATP synthase during cellular respiration or photophosphorylation.

An ion gradient has potential energy and can be used to power chemical reactions when the ions pass through a channel (red).

Hydrogen ions, or protons, will diffuse from a region of high proton concentration to a region of lower proton concentration, and an electrochemical concentration gradient of protons across a membrane can be harnessed to make ATP. This process is related to osmosis, the movement of water across a selective membrane, which is why it is called "chemiosmosis".

ATP synthase is the enzyme that makes ATP by chemiosmosis. It allows protons to pass through the membrane and uses the free energy difference to phosphorylate adenosine diphosphate (ADP) into ATP. The ATP synthase contains two parts: F_{0} and F_{1}. The breakdown of the proton gradient leads to conformational change in F_{1}—providing enough energy in the process to convert ADP to ATP. The generation of ATP by chemiosmosis occurs in mitochondria and chloroplasts, as well as in most bacteria and archaea. For instance, in chloroplasts during photosynthesis, an electron transport chain pumps H^{+} ions (protons) in the stroma (fluid) through the thylakoid membrane into the thylakoid spaces. The stored energy is used to photophosphorylate ADP, making ATP, as protons move through ATP synthase.

== The chemiosmotic hypothesis ==
Peter D. Mitchell proposed the chemiosmotic hypothesis in 1961. In brief, the hypothesis was that most adenosine triphosphate (ATP) synthesis in respiring cells comes from the electrochemical gradient across the inner membranes of mitochondria by using the energy of NADH and FADH_{2} formed during the oxidative breakdown of energy-rich molecules such as glucose.

Oxidative phosphorylation involves two processes — the electron transport chain and chemiosmosis — and occurs in mitochondria.

Molecules such as glucose are metabolized to produce acetyl CoA as a fairly energy-rich intermediate. The oxidation of acetyl coenzyme A (acetyl-CoA) in the mitochondrial matrix is coupled to the reduction of a carrier molecule such as nicotinamide adenine dinucleotide (NAD) and flavin adenine dinucleotide (FAD). The carriers pass electrons to the electron transport chain (ETC) in the inner mitochondrial membrane, which in turn pass them to other proteins in the ETC. The energy at every redox transfer step is used to pump protons from the matrix into the intermembrane space, storing energy in the form of a transmembrane electrochemical gradient. The protons move back across the inner membrane through the enzyme ATP synthase. The flow of protons back into the matrix of the mitochondrion via ATP synthase provides enough energy for ADP to combine with inorganic phosphate to form ATP.

This was a radical proposal at the time, and was not well accepted. The prevailing view was that the energy of electron transfer was stored as a stable high potential intermediate, a chemically more conservative concept. The problem with the older paradigm is that no high energy intermediate was ever found, and the evidence for proton pumping by the complexes of the electron transfer chain grew too great to be ignored. Eventually the weight of evidence began to favor the chemiosmotic hypothesis, and in 1978 Peter D. Mitchell was awarded the Nobel Prize in Chemistry.

Chemiosmotic coupling is important for ATP production in mitochondria, chloroplasts and many bacteria and archaea.

== Proton-motive force ==
Energy conversion by the inner mitochondrial membrane and chemiosmotic coupling between the chemical energy of redox reactions in the respiratory chain and the oxidative phosphorylation catalysed by the ATP synthase.

The movement of ions across the membrane depends on a combination of two factors:

1. Diffusion force caused by a concentration gradient - all particles tend to diffuse from higher concentration to lower.
2. Electrostatic force caused by electrical potential gradient - cations like protons H^{+} tend to diffuse down the electrical potential, from the positive (P) side of the membrane to the negative (N) side. Anions diffuse spontaneously in the opposite direction.

These two gradients taken together can be expressed as an electrochemical gradient.

Lipid bilayers of biological membranes, however, are barriers for ions. This is why energy can be stored as a combination of these two gradients across the membrane. Only special membrane proteins like ion channels can sometimes allow ions to move across the membrane (see also: Membrane transport). In the chemiosmotic hypothesis a transmembrane ATP synthase is central to convert energy of spontaneous flow of protons through them into chemical energy of ATP bonds.

Hence researchers created the term proton-motive force (PMF), derived from the electrochemical gradient mentioned earlier. It can be described as the measure of the potential energy stored (chemiosmotic potential) as a combination of proton and voltage (electrical potential) gradients across a membrane. The electrical gradient is a consequence of the charge separation across the membrane (when the protons H^{+} move without a counterion, such as chloride Cl^{−}).

In most cases the proton-motive force is generated by an electron transport chain which acts as a proton pump, using the Gibbs free energy of redox reactions to pump protons (hydrogen ions) out across the membrane, separating the charge across the membrane. In mitochondria, energy released by the electron transport chain is used to move protons from the mitochondrial matrix (N side) to the intermembrane space (P side). Moving the protons out of the mitochondrion creates a lower concentration of positively charged protons inside it, resulting in excess negative charge on the inside of the membrane. The electrical potential gradient is about -170 mV, negative inside (N). These gradients - charge difference and the proton concentration difference both create a combined electrochemical gradient across the membrane, often expressed as the proton-motive force (PMF). In mitochondria, the PMF is almost entirely made up of the electrical component but in chloroplasts the PMF is made up mostly of the pH gradient because the charge of protons H^{+} is neutralized by the movement of Cl^{−} and other anions. In either case, the PMF needs to be greater than about 460 mV (45 kJ/mol) for the ATP synthase to be able to make ATP.

=== Equations ===
The proton-motive force is derived from the Gibbs free energy. Let N denote the inside of a cell, and P denote the outside. Then

$$\Delta\!G = zF \Delta\!\psi + RT \ln\frac{[\mathrm{X}^{z+}]_{\text{N}} }{[\mathrm{X}^{z+}]_{\text{P}}}$$

where

- $\Delta\!G$ is the Gibbs free energy change per unit amount of cations transferred from P to N;
- $z$ is the charge number of the cation $\mathrm{X}^{z+}$;
- $\Delta\psi$ is the electric potential of N relative to P;
- $[\mathrm{X}^{z+}]_{\text{P}}$ and $[\mathrm{X}^{z+}]_{\text{N}}$ are the cation concentrations at P and N, respectively;
- $F$ is the Faraday constant;
- $R$ is the gas constant; and
- $T$ is the temperature.

The molar Gibbs free energy change $\Delta\!G$ is frequently interpreted as a molar electrochemical ion potential $\Delta\!\mu _{\mathrm{X}^{z+}} = \Delta\!G$.

For an electrochemical proton gradient $z=1$ and as a consequence:

$$\Delta\!\mu _{\mathrm{H}^{+}} = F \Delta\!\psi + RT \ln \frac{[\mathrm{H}^+]_{\text{N}} }{[\mathrm{H}^+]_{\text{P}}} = F \Delta\!\psi - (\ln 10)RT \Delta \mathrm{pH}$$

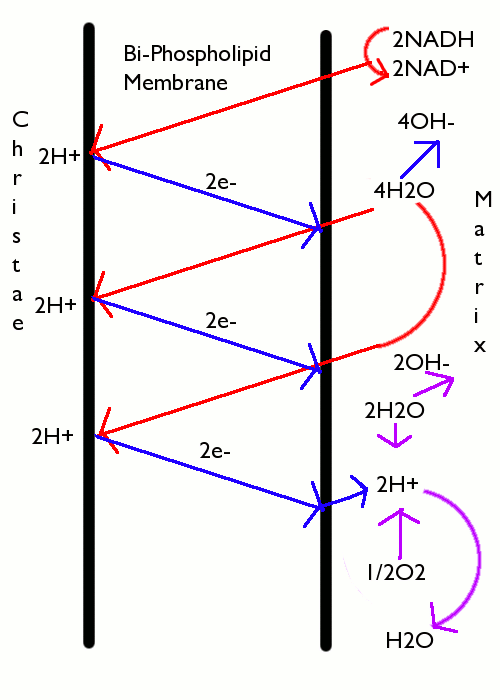
A diagram of chemiosmotic phosphorylation

where

$$\Delta\!\mathrm{pH} = \mathrm{pH}_{\mathrm{N}} - \mathrm{pH}_{\mathrm{P}}$$.

Mitchell defined the proton-motive force (PMF) as

$$\Delta\!p = -\frac{\Delta\!\mu_{\mathrm{H^{+}}}}{F}$$.

For example, $\Delta\!\mu_{\mathrm{H}^+}=1\,\mathrm{kJ}\,\mathrm{mol}^{-1}$ implies $\Delta\!p = 10.4\,\mathrm{mV}$. At $298\,\mathrm{K}$ this equation takes the form:

$\Delta\!p = -\Delta\!\psi + \left(59.1\,\mathrm{mV}\right)\Delta\!\mathrm{pH}$.

Note that for spontaneous proton import from the P side (relatively more positive and acidic) to the N side (relatively more negative and alkaline), $\Delta\!\mu _{\mathrm{H}^+}$ is negative (similar to $\Delta\!G$) whereas PMF is positive (similar to redox cell potential $\Delta E$).

It is worth noting that, as with any transmembrane transport process, the PMF is directional. The sign of the transmembrane electric potential difference $\Delta\!\psi$ is chosen to represent the change in potential energy per unit charge flowing into the cell as above. Furthermore, due to redox-driven proton pumping by coupling sites, the proton gradient is always inside-alkaline. For both of these reasons, protons flow in spontaneously, from the P side to the N side; the available free energy is used to synthesize ATP (see below). For this reason, PMF is defined for proton import, which is spontaneous. PMF for proton export, i.e., proton pumping as catalyzed by the coupling sites, is simply the negative of PMF(import).

The spontaneity of proton import (from the P to the N side) is universal in all bioenergetic membranes. This fact was not recognized before the 1990s, because the chloroplast thylakoid lumen was interpreted as an interior phase, but in fact it is topologically equivalent to the exterior of the chloroplast. Azzone et al. stressed that the inside phase (N side of the membrane) is the bacterial cytoplasm, mitochondrial matrix, or chloroplast stroma; the outside (P) side is the bacterial periplasmic space, mitochondrial intermembrane space, or chloroplast lumen. Furthermore, 3D tomography of the mitochondrial inner membrane shows its extensive invaginations to be stacked, similar to thylakoid disks; hence the mitochondrial intermembrane space is topologically quite similar to the chloroplast lumen.:

The energy expressed here as Gibbs free energy, electrochemical proton gradient, or proton-motive force (PMF), is a combination of two gradients across the membrane:

1. the concentration gradient (via $\Delta\!\mathrm{pH}$) and
2. electric potential gradient $\Delta\!\psi$.

When a system reaches equilibrium, $\Delta\!\rho = 0$; nevertheless, the concentrations on either side of the membrane need not be equal. Spontaneous movement across the potential membrane is determined by both concentration and electric potential gradients.

The molar Gibbs free energy $\Delta\!G_{\mathrm{p}}$ of ATP synthesis

$$\mathrm{ADP}^{4-} + \mathrm{H}^{+} + \mathrm{HOPO}_3^{2-} \rightarrow \mathrm{ATP}^{4-} + \mathrm{H_2 O}$$

is also called phosphorylation potential. The equilibrium concentration ratio $[\mathrm{H}^+]/[\mathrm{ATP}]$ can be calculated by comparing $\Delta\!p$ and $\Delta\!G_{\mathrm{p}}$, for example in case of the mammalian mitochondrion:

H^{+} / ATP = ΔG_{p} / (Δp / 10.4 kJ·mol^{−1}/mV) = 40.2 kJ·mol^{−1} / (173.5 mV / 10.4 kJ·mol^{−1}/mV) = 40.2 / 16.7 = 2.4. The actual ratio of the proton-binding c-subunit to the ATP-synthesizing beta-subunit copy numbers is 8/3 = 2.67, showing that under these conditions, the mitochondrion functions at 90% (2.4/2.67) efficiency.

In fact, the thermodynamic efficiency is mostly lower in eukaryotic cells because ATP must be exported from the matrix to the cytoplasm, and ADP and phosphate must be imported from the cytoplasm. This "costs" one "extra" proton import per ATP, hence the actual efficiency is only 65% (= 2.4/3.67).

== In mitochondria ==
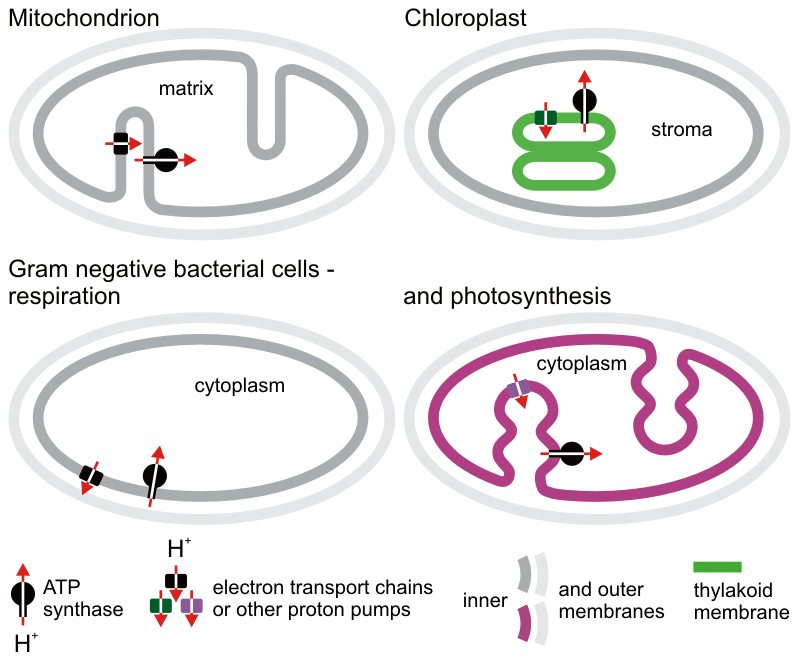
Directions of chemiosmotic proton transfer in the mitochondrion, chloroplast and in gram-negative bacterial cells (cellular respiration and photosynthesis). The bacterial cell wall is omitted, gram-positive bacterial cells do not have outer membrane.

The complete breakdown of glucose releasing its energy is called cellular respiration. The last steps of this process occur in mitochondria. The reduced molecules NADH and FADH_{2} are generated by the Krebs cycle, glycolysis, and pyruvate processing. These molecules pass electrons to an electron transport chain, which releases the energy of oxygen to create a proton gradient across the inner mitochondrial membrane. ATP synthase then uses the energy stored in this gradient to make ATP. This process is called oxidative phosphorylation because it uses energy released by the oxidation of NADH and FADH_{2} to phosphorylate ADP into ATP.

== In plants ==
The light reactions of photosynthesis generate ATP by the action of chemiosmosis. The photons in sunlight are received by the antenna complex of Photosystem II, which excites electrons to a higher energy level. These electrons travel down an electron transport chain, causing protons to be actively pumped across the thylakoid membrane into the thylakoid lumen. These protons then flow down their electrochemical potential gradient through an enzyme called ATP-synthase, creating ATP by the phosphorylation of ADP to ATP. The electrons from the initial light reaction reach Photosystem I, then are raised to a higher energy level by light energy and then received by an electron acceptor and reduce NADP^{+} to NADPH. The electrons lost from Photosystem II get replaced by the oxidation of water, which is "split" into protons and oxygen by the oxygen-evolving complex (OEC, also known as WOC, or the water-oxidizing complex). To generate one molecule of diatomic oxygen, 10 photons must be absorbed by Photosystems I and II, four electrons must move through the two photosystems, and 2 NADPH are generated (later used for carbon dioxide fixation in the Calvin Cycle).

== In prokaryotes ==
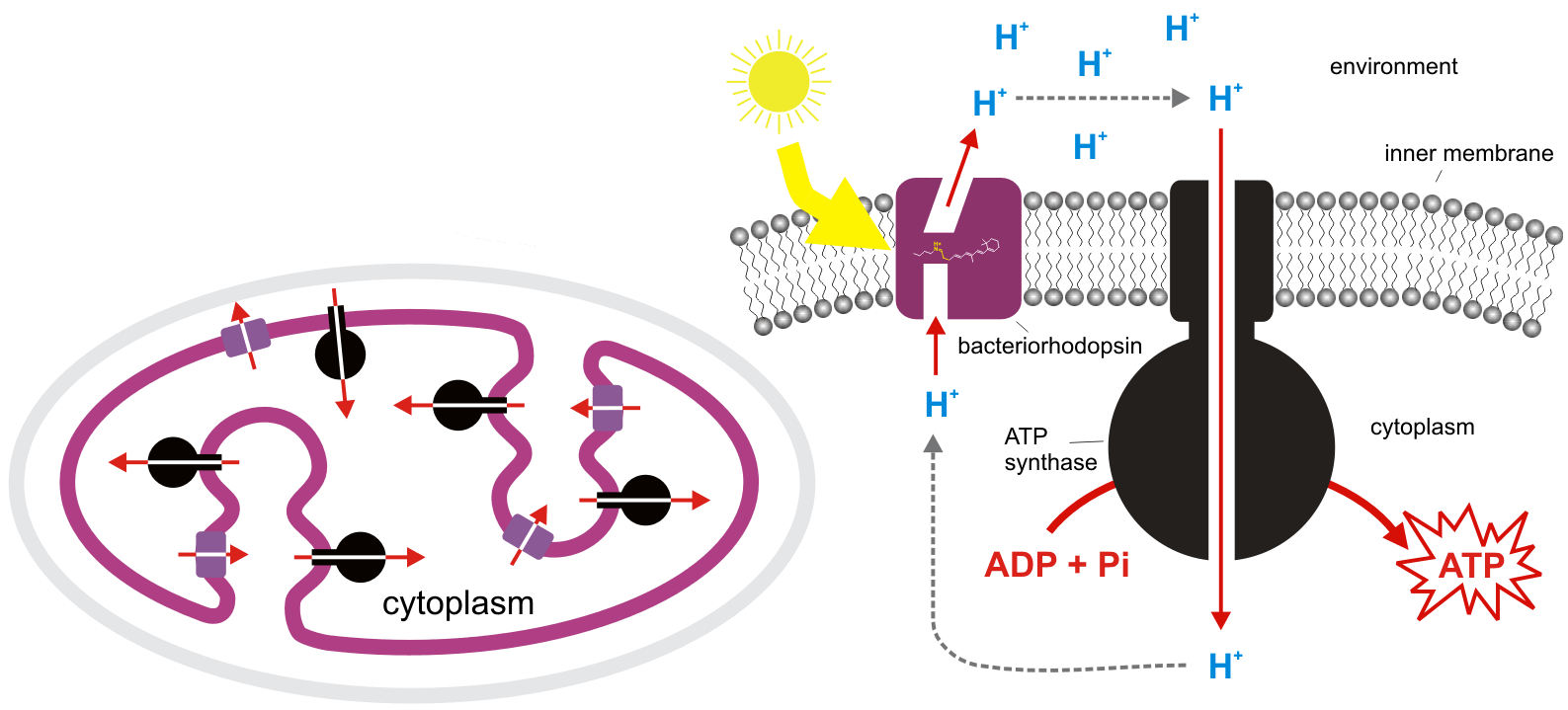
Chemiosmotic coupling between the energy of sunlight, bacteriorhodopsin and phosphorylation (chemical energy) during photosynthesis in the halophilic archaeal organism Halobacterium salinarum (syn. H. halobium). The archaeal cell wall is omitted.

Bacteria and archaea also can use chemiosmosis to generate ATP. Cyanobacteria, green sulfur bacteria, and purple bacteria synthesize ATP by a process called photophosphorylation. These bacteria use the energy of light to create a proton gradient using a photosynthetic electron transport chain. Non-photosynthetic bacteria such as E. coli also contain ATP synthase. In fact, mitochondria and chloroplasts are the product of endosymbiosis and trace back to incorporated prokaryotes. This process is described in the endosymbiotic theory. The origin of the mitochondrion triggered the origin of eukaryotes, and the origin of the plastid the origin of the Archaeplastida, one of the major eukaryotic supergroups.

Chemiosmotic phosphorylation is the third pathway that produces ATP from inorganic phosphate and an ADP molecule. This process is part of oxidative phosphorylation.

== Emergence of chemiosmosis ==
Early cell powered by external proton gradient near a deep-sea hydrothermal vent. As long as the membrane (or passive ion channels within it) is permeable to protons, the mechanism can function without ion pumps.

=== Thermal cycling model ===
A stepwise model for the emergence of chemiosmosis, a key element in the origin of life on earth, proposes that primordial organisms used thermal cycling as an energy source (thermosynthesis), functioning essentially as a heat engine:

self-organized convection in natural waters causing thermal cycling →

added β-subunit of F_{1} ATP synthase
(generated ATP by thermal cycling of subunit during suspension in convection cell: thermosynthesis) →

added membrane and F_{o} ATP synthase moiety
(generated ATP by change in electrical polarization of membrane during thermal cycling: thermosynthesis) →

added metastable, light-induced electric dipoles in membrane
(primitive photosynthesis) →

added quinones and membrane-spanning light-induced electric dipoles
(today's bacterial photosynthesis, which makes use of chemiosmosis).

=== External proton gradient model ===
Biochemist Nick Lane has proposed the following hypothesis. Deep-sea hydrothermal vents, emitting hot acidic or alkaline water, would have created external proton gradients. These provided energy that primordial organisms could have exploited. To keep the flows separate, such an organism could have wedged itself in the rock of the hydrothermal vent, exposed to the hydrothermal flow on one side and the more alkaline water on the other. As long as the organism's membrane (or passive ion channels within it) is permeable to protons, the mechanism can function without ion pumps. Such a proto-organism could then have evolved further mechanisms such as ion pumps and ATP synthase.

=== Meteoritic quinones ===
A proposed alternative source to chemiosmotic energy developing across membranous structures is if an electron acceptor, ferricyanide, is within a vesicle and the electron donor is outside, quinones transported by carbonaceous meteorites pick up electrons and protons from the donor. They would release electrons across the lipid membrane by diffusion to ferricyanide within the vesicles and release protons which produces gradients above pH 2, the process is conducive to the development of proton gradients.

== See also ==
- Cellular respiration
- Citric acid cycle
- Electrochemical gradient
- Glycolysis
- Oxidative phosphorylation
