= Shirley Pearce =

British academic and psychologist

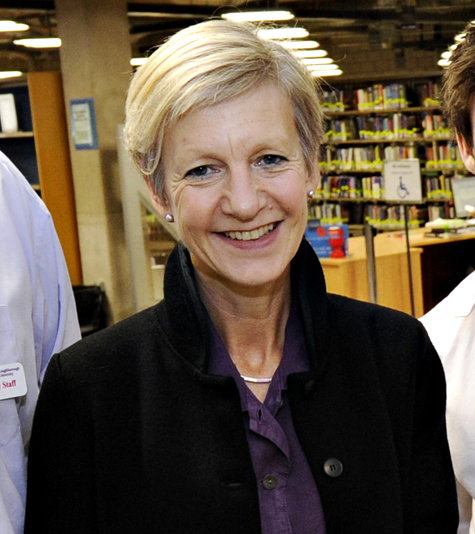
Pearce in 2010

Dame Shirley Anne Pearce DBE (born February 1954) is a British academic and psychologist. She is Chair of Court and Council at the London School of Economics and Political Science and a member of the Higher Education Quality Assurance Panel for the Ministry of Education (Singapore).

She is the former Vice-Chancellor of Loughborough University, a position she held from January 2006, leaving at the end of the 2011–12 academic year. She still holds an Emeritus Chair at Loughborough. Before becoming Loughborough University's 7th Vice-Chancellor, Pearce was a Professor of Health Psychology at the University of East Anglia and Dean of the Institute of Health. She had also served as Pro-Vice-Chancellor of the University of East Anglia from 2001 to 2004, responsible for health and the professional schools.

== Early life and education ==
Born on 19 February 1954, Shirley Pearce was educated at Norwich High School for Girls, before studying psychology, physiology, and philosophy at St Anne's College, Oxford University, gaining a Bachelor of Arts degree in 1975.

She then trained in Clinical Psychology and at the Institute of Psychiatry, University of London, now part of King's College London. While working at University College London, she studied part-time as a postgraduate student, obtaining her PhD degree in Psychology in 1986.

== Career ==
She joined the National Health Service as a clinical psychologist at St Mary's Hospital, London in 1977, and remained there until her appointment as lecturer then senior lecturer in Psychology at University College London. Her move to the University of East Anglia (UEA) in 1994 was to become the Chair of Health Psychology and the inaugural director of the School of Health Policy and Practice, becoming Dean of the Schools of Health in 1997 and leading the bid for a new medical school at UEA during this period.

Pearce was made Pro-Vice-Chancellor for the health and professional schools in 2000, before becoming Dean of the Institute of Health and Director of the Centre for Interprofessional Practice at UEA. During this time she was also a Non-executive director of Norfolk, Suffolk and Cambridgeshire Strategic Health Authority and deputy chair of the Healthcare Commission.

She became Vice-Chancellor of Loughborough University in 2006.

She has held positions at the Department of Health, BIS and the Home Office. Prior to moving to LSE, she was appointed Independent Chair of the College of Policing, the first professional body for policing.

She was appointed as LSE's chair of court and council in November 2016 and took up the post in January 2017.

== Chair of Court and Council ==
Her appointment as Chair of Court and Council at LSE was announced in November 2016 and she arrived in January 2017.

== Honours ==
She was appointed Commander of the Order of the British Empire (CBE) in the 2005 Birthday Honours for services to the National Health Service and elevated to Dame Commander of the Order of the British Empire (DBE) in the 2014 New Year Honours for services to higher education.

== Personal life ==
In 2012, she married Sir John Gains, the Chief Executive from 1995 to 2004 of Mowlem.

Academic offices
Preceded by Alan Elias	Chair of Court and Council of London School of Economics and Political Science; 2017–present	Incumbent
Preceded by Prof Sir David Wallace	Vice-Chancellor of Loughborough University; 2006–2012	Succeeded by Prof Robert Alison
