= 1919 in the United Kingdom =

Events from the year 1919 in the United Kingdom.

== Incumbents ==
- Monarch – George V
- Prime Minister – David Lloyd George (Coalition)

== Events ==
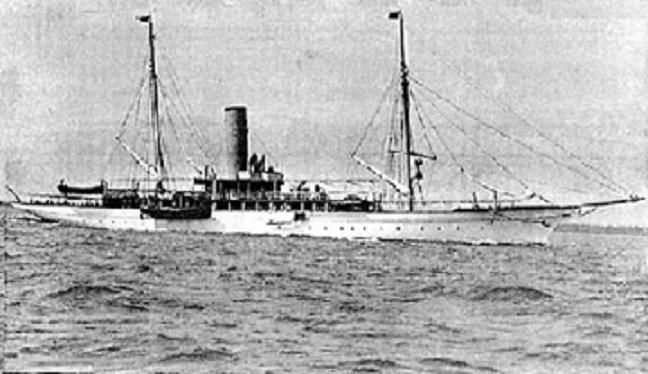
1 January: Iolaire sinks.

- 1 January – HMY Iolaire is wrecked on rocks off Stornoway on the Scottish Isle of Lewis: 205 die, mostly servicemen returning home.
- 3 January – Soldiers blockade Folkestone harbour in a successful protest against being returned to France. This month, other mutinies take place in France and across England.
- 18 January
  - The Paris Peace Conference opens in France, with delegates from 27 nations present for meetings at the Palace of Versailles; Lloyd George attends as one of the "Big Four".
  - Bentley Motors Ltd. is incorporated in England.
- 21 January – Dáil Éireann meets for the first time in the Mansion House, Dublin. It comprises Sinn Féin members elected in the 1918 general election who, in accordance with their manifesto, have not taken their seats in the Parliament of the United Kingdom but chosen to declare an independent Irish Republic. In the first shots of the Anglo-Irish War, two Royal Irish Constabulary men are killed in an ambush at Soloheadbeg in County Tipperary.
- 23 January – "Harbour Riot" in Glasgow: confrontation between white and black merchant seamen.
- 27 January – General strike call over working hours led by engineering workers in Glasgow and Belfast; in Belfast the strike collapses after a month.
- 31 January – Battle of George Square: the police deal with riots associated with a strike to gain a 40-hour working week in Glasgow; the civil authorities call in the army (with tanks).

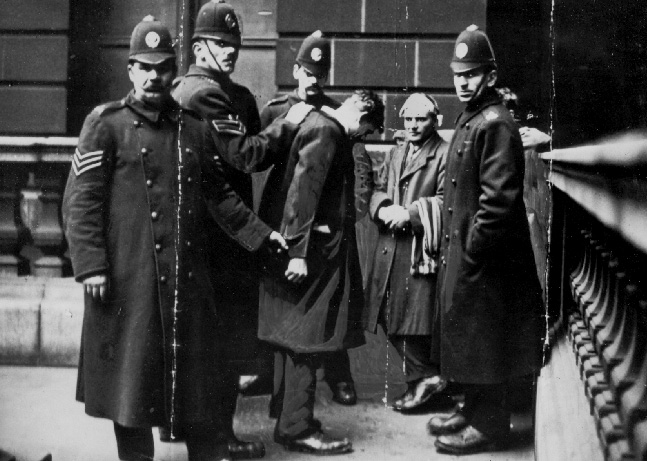
January: David Kirkwood is detained by police during the Battle of George Square.

- 3 February – Éamon de Valera, the leader of Sinn Féin, and two other prisoners escape from Lincoln Prison in England in a break personally arranged by Michael Collins and Harry Boland.
- 27 February – Marriage of Princess Patricia of Connaught to Commander The Hon. Alexander Ramsay, the first royal wedding at Westminster Abbey since the 14th century.
- 4–5 March – Kinmel Park riots by troops of the Canadian Expeditionary Force awaiting repatriation at Kinmel Camp, Bodelwyddan, in North Wales. Five men are killed, 28 injured, and 25 convicted of mutiny.
- 3 April – Government agrees to begin release of imprisoned conscientious objectors.
- 7 April – The Original Dixieland Jass Band brings Dixieland jazz to England, opening a 15-month tour at the Hippodrome, London.
- 13 April – Amritsar Massacre: British and Gurkha troops kill 379 Sikhs and injure more than 1200 at Jallianwala Bagh in Amritsar, Punjab Province (British India).
- May – Third Anglo-Afghan War begins.
- 12 May – The Pip, Squeak and Wilfred comic strip debuts in the Daily Mirror.
- 15 May – Greek landing at Smyrna (as part of the Greco-Turkish War): The Hellenic Army lands at Smyrna assisted by ships of the British Royal Navy.
- 29 May – Observations made by Arthur Eddington during a solar eclipse test part of Einstein's general theory of relativity (confirmed 6 November).
- June – Riots break out in West Midlands towns.
- 14–15 June – A Vickers Vimy piloted by John Alcock DSC with navigator Arthur Whitten Brown makes the first nonstop transatlantic flight, from St. John's, Newfoundland and Labrador, to Clifden, Connemara, Ireland.
- 17 June – Epsom Riot by Canadian troops: English police sergeant Thomas Green is killed.
- 21 June – Scuttling of the German fleet at Scapa Flow: Admiral Ludwig von Reuter scuttles the interned German fleet in Scapa Flow, Scotland. Nine German sailors are killed.
- 23 June – Women's Engineering Society founded.
- 28 June – Treaty of Versailles signed, formally ending World War I.

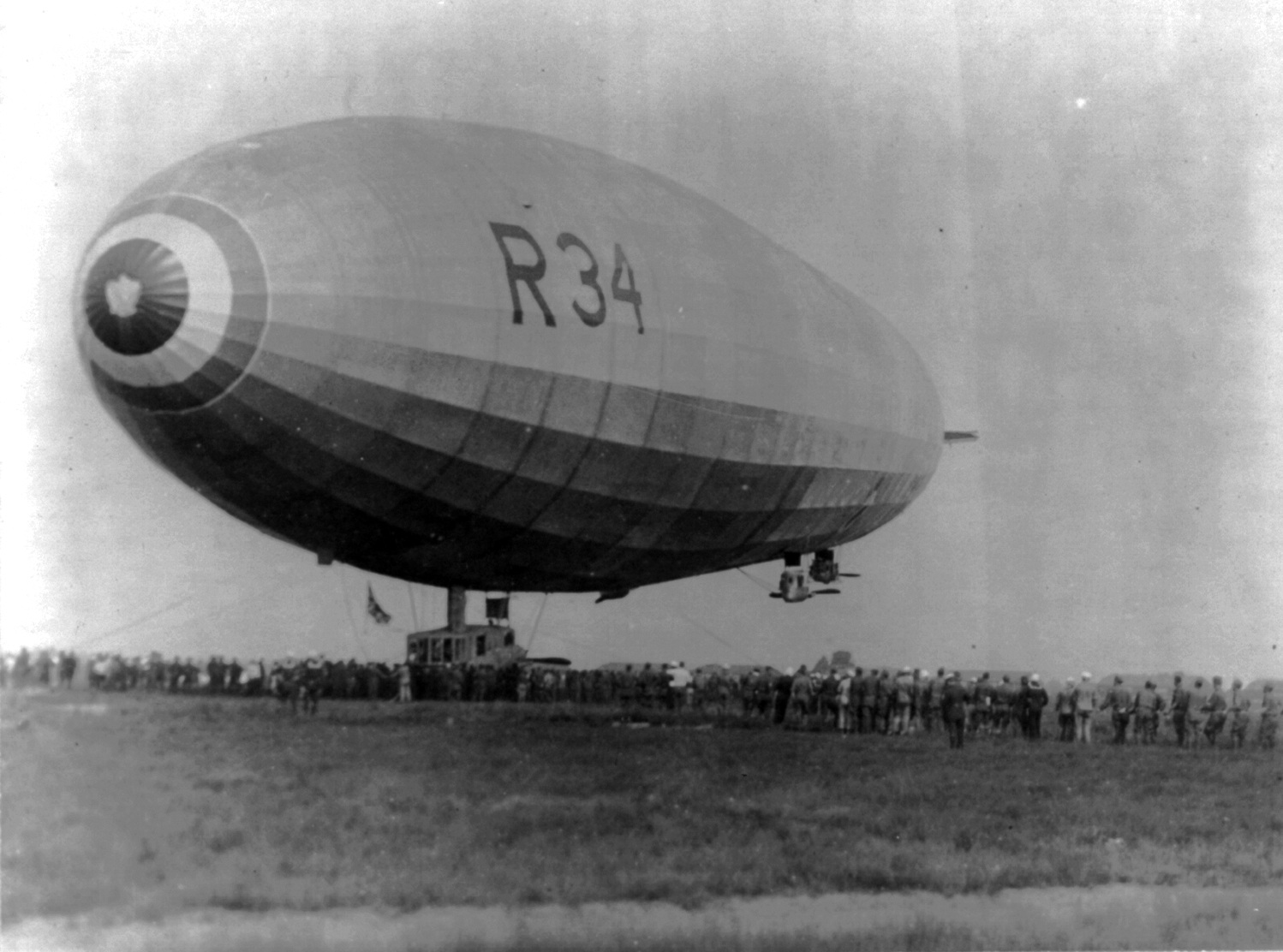
6 July: R34 lands at Mineola, New York.

- 2–6 July – The British airship R34 makes the first transatlantic flight by dirigible, and the first westbound flight, from RAF East Fortune, Scotland, to Mineola, New York.
- 15 July – Naval sloops HMS Gentian and HMS Myrtle sunk by mines in the Gulf of Finland while assisting Estonia against the Bolsheviks, with nine crew lost.
- 18 July – The Cenotaph in London, as designed by Edwin Lutyens, is unveiled to commemorate the dead of World War I.
- 19 July – Peace Day: victory parades across Britain celebrate the end of World War I. Rioting ex-servicemen burn down Luton Town Hall.
- 31 July
  - Police strike in London and Liverpool for recognition of the National Union of Police and Prison Officers. Rioting breaks out in Liverpool on 1 August. Over 2,000 strikers are dismissed.
  - Housing, Town Planning, &c. Act 1919 provides government subsidy for the provision of council houses, with the target of completing 500,000 houses by 1922.
- 8 August – The Anglo-Afghan Treaty of 1919, signed in Rawalpindi, ends the Third Anglo-Afghan War, with the UK recognising the right of the Emirate of Afghanistan to manage its own foreign affairs and Afghanistan recognising the Durand Line as the border with British India.
- 9 August – The Anglo-Persian Agreement, signed in Tehran, grants the UK access to all Iranian oilfields in exchange for financial and other contributions. The Majlis (Iranian parliament) refuses to ratify it on 22 June 1921.
- 15 August – The Restoration of Pre-War Practices Act provides for returning servicemen to get their old jobs back.
- 18 August – Allied intervention in the Russian Civil War: The Bolshevik fleet at Kronstadt, protecting Petrograd on the Baltic Sea, is substantially damaged by seven British Royal Navy Coastal Motor Boats (torpedo boats) and military aircraft in a combined operation.
- 30 August – The Football League is resumed, four years after it was abandoned due to the war.
- 1 September – Forestry Commission set up.
- 27 September – Allied intervention in the Russian Civil War: The last British troops leave Archangel, leaving fighting to the Russians.
- 27 September–6 October – Railway workers stage a strike, called by the National Union of Railwaymen.
- 29 September – Rupert D'Oyly Carte returns the D'Oyly Carte Opera Company to London's West End for the first time in a decade with an initial 18-week season of Gilbert and Sullivan comic operas opening at the Prince's Theatre in Shaftesbury Avenue.
- 30 September – Compositors and pressmen working at the Daily Sketch newspaper in London refuse to print the paper until an editorial criticising the railway strike is deleted.
- October – Creation of the "Mobile Patrol Experiment", the forerunner of the Metropolitan Police Service's Flying Squad.
- 1 October – Women's Royal Naval Service disbanded.
- 13 October – Leeds City F.C., of the Football League Second Division, are expelled from the Football League amid financial irregularities.
- 17 October – With the collapse of Leeds City, a new football club is formed for the city – Leeds United. With Port Vale set to take the old club's place in the Football League, the new Leeds club will have to wait until at least the next football season for a chance of Football League membership.
- 20 October – Collapse of the man engine at Levant Mine in Cornwall kills 31.
- 21 October – Atlas Copco Ltd is incorporated in the UK as a subsidiary of the Swedish mechanical engineering company.
- 4 November – The Cabinet's Irish Committee settles on a policy of creating two Home Rule parliaments in Ireland – one in Dublin and one in Belfast – with a Council of Ireland to provide a framework for possible unity.
- 11 November – First Remembrance Day observed with two minutes silence at 11:00 hrs.
- December
  - Cunliffe Committee on Currency and Foreign Exchange Rates recommends an early return to an effective Gold standard.
  - Nurses Registration Act 1919 passed.
- 1 December – Nancy Astor, Viscountess Astor becomes the first woman to take her seat in the House of Commons, and the second to be elected, having stood at the Plymouth Sutton by-election on 28 November to succeed her husband as a Unionist member.
- 15 December – Meat rationing ends.
- 22 December – A bill "to provide for the better government of Ireland" is introduced into the House of Commons, proposing two parliaments: one for the six counties of north-east Ulster and one for the other twenty-six.
- 23 December – Sex Disqualification (Removal) Act removes legal disabilities on women entering the secular professions, becoming justices of the peace or being granted university degrees.
- 25 December – Opening of Cliftonhill stadium in Coatbridge, the home of Albion Rovers F.C. The opening match sees them lose 2–0 to St Mirren.
- 30 December – Lincoln's Inn, in London, admits its first female bar student.
- 31 December – First female justice of the peace sworn in, Ada Summers, Mayor of Stalybridge.
- Undated
  - University Grants Committee begins to function.
  - Panacea Society founded by Mabel Barltrop ("Octavia") in Bedford as the Community of the Holy Ghost.
  - 1919 British race riots
- Ongoing – 1918 flu pandemic.

== Publications ==
- February – Richmal Crompton's anarchic schoolboy William Brown is introduced in the first published Just William story, "Rice-Mould" in Home magazine.
- 22 March – The Children's Newspaper, edited by Arthur Mee, begins publication.
- Daisy Ashford's novel The Young Visiters (written in 1890 when she was nine).
- Gilbert Frankau's novel Peter Jackson, Cigar Merchant: a romance of married life.
- E. M. Hull's romantic novel The Sheik.
- Dean William Inge's first series of Outspoken Essays.
- John Maynard Keynes' book The Economic Consequences of the Peace.
- W. Somerset Maugham's novel The Moon and Sixpence.
- The War Poems of Siegfried Sassoon.
- Arthur Graeme West's posthumous The Diary of a Dead Officer.
- P. G. Wodehouse's short story collection My Man Jeeves.

== Births ==
- 1 January – Sheila Mercier, actress (died 2019)
- 8 January – Gabrielle Blunt, actress (died 2014)
- 11 January
  - Denis Avey, World War II veteran and memoirist (died 2015)
  - Margot Rufus Isaacs, Marchioness of Reading, aristocrat and campaigner (died 2015)
- 20 January
  - Derick Ashe, diplomat (died 2000)
  - John Wilson, blind activist (died 1999)
- 21 January
  - Eric Brown, World War II naval and test pilot (died 2016)
  - Jim Wallwork, World War II glider pilot (died 2013)
- 23 January – Bob Paisley, football player and manager (died 1996)
- 25 January – Norman Newell, record producer and lyricist (died 2004)
- 26 January – Bill Nicholson, footballer and manager (died 2004)
- 27 January
  - Tom Addington, soldier (died 2011)
  - David Clark, cricketer (died 2013)
- 29 January – N. F. Simpson, playwright (died 2011)
- 4 February
  - Peter Butterworth, actor and comedian (died 1979)
  - John Miller, World War II lieutenant-colonel and equerry (died 2006)
- 6 February – Sidney De Haan, businessman (died 2002)
- 16 February – Irene Brown, author and codebreaker (died 2017)
- 17 February – Marguerite Wolff, pianist (died 2011)
- 19 February – Samuel Falle, diplomat (died 2014)
- 20 February – James O'Meara, Battle of Britain Spitfire flying ace (died 1974)
- 23 February – Derek Ezra, chairman of the National Coal Board (died 2015)
- 24 February
  - Henry Kitchener, 3rd Earl Kitchener, nobleman (died 2011)
  - Betty Marsden, comedy actress (died 1998)
- 28 February – Brian Urquhart, war veteran and diplomat (died 2021)
- 1 March – Jock Hamilton-Baillie, World War II soldier and escapee (died 2003)
- 3 March – Mary Cosh, journalist, historian and author (died 2019)
- 11 March – Hans Keller, Austrian-born musician and writer (died 1985)
- 12 March – Donald Zec, journalist (died 2021)
- 16 March – Julian Pitt-Rivers, social anthropologist and ethnographer (died 2001)
- 17 March – Mad Mike Hoare, mercenary leader (died 2020)
- 18 March – G. E. M. Anscombe, analytic philosopher (died 2001)
- 20 March – Peter Conder, ornithologist and conservationist (died 1993)
- 21 March – R. M. Hare, moral philosopher (died 2002)
- 26 March – Joe Egan, rugby player (died 2012)
- 28 March – Tony Bartley, television executive (died 2001)
- 29 March – William S. Anderson, Chinese-born businessman, president and chairman of NCR Corporation (died 2021)
- 30 March – Henry Danton, dance teacher (died 2022)
- 1 April – Nicholas Henderson, diplomat (died 2009)
- 3 April
  - Victor Cannings, cricketer (died 2016)
  - Hugh FitzRoy, 11th Duke of Grafton, nobleman (died 2011)
- 4 April – Frederick E. Smith, author (died 2012)
- 5 April
  - Nigel Malim, World War II rear admiral (died 2006)
  - Charles Parker, radio documentary producer (died 1980)
- 9 April
  - Nicholas Goodhart, rear-admiral and aviator (died 2011)
  - Iain Moncreiffe of that Ilk, Officer of Arms and genealogist (died 1985)
- 11 April
  - Raymond Carr, historian (died 2015)
  - William Clark, Royal air force officer (died 2020)
  - John Nunn, Royal Air Force officer and politician (died 2013)
  - Don Smoothey, actor and comedian (died 2015)
- 12 April – Ion Calvocoressi, Army officer and stockbroker (died 2007)
- 14 April – Leslie Lloyd Rees, Anglican prelate (died 2013)
- 15 April
  - Emyr Humphreys, Welsh novelist, poet and author (died 2020)
  - Sonia Rolt, canal conservationist (died 2014)
- 18 April – Natasha Spender, pianist and writer (died 2010)
- 19 April – Nancie Colling, lawns bowls player (died 2020)
- 20 April
  - Richard Hillary, pilot and author (died 1943)
  - Angela Lascelles, actress (died 2007)
- 23 April – Andrew Roth, biographer and journalist (died 2010)
- 25 April – Ambrose Weekes, Anglican priest (died 2012)
- 26 April – Barrie Edgar, television producer (died 2012)
- 4 May – Basil Yamey, South African-born economist and academic (died 2020)
- 7 May
  - Emanuel Hurwitz, violinist (died 2006)
  - Joe Mitty, entrepreneur and co-founder of Oxfam (died 2007)
- 9 May – Arthur English, actor (died 1995)
- 14 May – Denis Cannan, dramatist, playwright and scriptwriter (died 2011)
- 16 May – Richard Mason, novelist (died 1997)
- 18 May – Margot Fonteyn, born Margaret Hookham, ballet dancer (died 1991)
- 22 May – Glyn Davies, Welsh economist (died 2003)
- 23 May – Gayatri Devi, British-born Indian princess and politician (died 2009)
- 29 May – Dickie Dodds, English cricketer (died 2001)
- 30 May – Eric Lomax, Army officer and author (died 2012)
- 1 June – Tod Sweeney, Army officer (died 2001)
- 6 June – Peter Carington, politician (died 2018)
- 11 June
  - Cynthia Cooke, military nurse and nursing administrator (died 2016)
  - Richard Todd, actor (died 2009)
  - Victor P. Whittaker, biochemist (died 2016)
- 12 June – David Innes Williams, paediatric urologist (died 2013)
- 14 June – June Spencer, actress (died 2024)
- 15 June – Eleanor Warren, cellist (died 2005)
- 17 June
  - Maurice Brown, RAF fighter pilot (died 2011)
  - John Moffat, Scottish Royal Navy pilot (died 2016)
  - Beryl Reid, actress (died 1996)
- 18 June – Gordon A. Smith, English-born Canadian artist (died 2020)
- 19 June
  - Rolf Noskwith, German-born businessman and codebreaker (died 2017)
  - Francis Purchas, judge (died 2003)
- 24 June – Michael Schofield, sociologist and campaigner (died 2014)
- 26 June
  - Donald M. Ashton, art director (died 2004)
  - Freddie Mills, boxer (died 1965)
- 27 June
  - Bryn Knowelden, rugby player (died 2010)
  - John Macquarrie, theologian and priest (died 2007)
  - Alec Stokes, physicist (died 2003)
- 29 June – Walter Babington Thomas, Commander of British Far East Land Forces (died 2017)
- 4 July
  - Keith Batey, codebreaker (died 2010)
  - Douglas Birks, English cricketer (died 2004)
- 7 July
  - Jon Pertwee, actor (died 1996)
  - Bill Stroud, English football player and coach (died 2006)
- 10 July
  - George Mackie, Baron Mackie of Benshie, Scottish politician (died 2015)
  - Ian Wallace, bass-baritone opera singer (died 2009)
- 14 July – John Pott, British Army officer (died 2005)
- 15 July – Iris Murdoch, Irish-born novelist and philosopher (died 1999)
- 17 July – Alan Cottrell, metallurgist (died 2012)
- 19 July – Patricia Medina, actress (died 2012)
- 20 July – Jacquemine Charrott Lodwidge, writer (died 2012)
- 21 July
  - Pentland Hick, entrepreneur, author and publisher (died 2016)
  - Lady Rose McLaren, aristocrat (died 2005)
- 26 July
  - James Lovelock, scientist, proponent of the Gaia hypothesis (died 2022)
  - Kenneth Snowman, jeweller (died 2002)
- 27 July
  - Raymond Cohen, violinist (died 2011)
  - Jack Goody, social anthropologist (died 2015)
- 29 July – Patricia H. Clarke, biochemist (died 2010)
- 31 July – Frank Giles, journalist and historian (died 2019)
- 1 August – Stanley Middleton, novelist (died 2009)
- 2 August – Julie Dawn, singer (died 2000)
- 3 August
  - David Aubrey Scott, diplomat (died 2010)
  - Dare Wilson, army general (died 2014)
- 8 August – John David Wilson, artist and animator (died 2013)
- 13 August – George Shearing, musician (died 2011)
- 14 August – Richard Keynes, physiologist (died 2010)
- 15 August – Bernard Barrell, composer (died 2005)
- 16 August – Reginald James Wallace, civil servant and governor (died 2012)
- 18 August – Patrick Shovelton, civil servant (died 2012)
- 22 August – Michael Langham, actor and director (died 2011)
- 27 August
  - Jack Dormand, politician (died 2003)
  - Bruce Kinloch, Army officer and author (died 2011)
- 28 August – Godfrey Hounsfield, electrical engineer and inventor, recipient of the Nobel Prize in Physiology or Medicine (died 2004)
- 29 August – Helen Shingler, actress (died 2019)
- 2 September – Lance Macklin, racing driver (died 2002)
- 4 September – Teddy Johnson, popular singer (died 2018)
- 6 September – Philip Woodward, mathematician and radar engineer (died 2018)
- 7 September – Neil Shields, politician and businessman (died 2002)
- 8 September – Alistair Urquhart, Scottish businessman and author (died 2016)
- 11 September
  - Bernard Feilden, conservation architect (died 2008)
  - Tony Iveson, Royal Air Force pilot and World War II veteran (died 2013)
- 13 September
  - Mary Midgley, moral philosopher (died 2018)
  - James Stuart-Smith, judge (died 2013)
  - George Weidenfeld, Baron Weidenfeld, publisher, philanthropist and politician (died 2016)
- 14 September – Olga Lowe, actress (died 2013)
- 15 September – Alfie Scopp, English-born Canadian actor (died 2021)
- 21 September – Nigel Stock, actor (died 1986)
- 27 September
  - Peter Coe, athletics coach (died 2008)
  - James H. Wilkinson, mathematician (died 1986)
- 2 October
  - John W. Duarte, composer and guitarist (died 2004)
  - Walter Luttrell, colonel and public servant (born in Australia; died 2007)
- 4 October – John Sawyer, romance novelist in collaboration with his wife Nancy Buckingham (died 1994)
- 5 October
  - Robert Kee, writer, journalist and broadcaster (died 2013)
  - Donald Pleasence, actor (died 1995)
- 6 October
  - Tommy Lawton, footballer (died 1996)
  - Molly Lefebure, writer (died 2013)
- 7 October – Irene Astor, Baroness Astor of Hever, philanthropist (died 2001)
- 8 October – Peter Ramsbotham, diplomat (died 2010)
- 14 October – Shaun Sutton, television executive (died 2004)
- 15 October
  - Howard Colvin, architectural historian (died 2007)
  - Edwin Charles Tubb, science fiction writer (died 2010)
- 18 October – George E. P. Box, statistician (died 2013)
- 19 October – David Pritchard, chess player (died 2005)
- 20 October – Maurice Michael Stephens, World War II fighter pilot (died 2004)
- 21 October – Maurice Hodgson, business executive (died 2014)
- 22 October
  - Kathleen Ankers, English-American actress and set designer (d. 2001)
  - Doris Lessing, Persian-born novelist, recipient of the Nobel Prize in Literature (died 2013)
- 23 October
  - John Hunt, civil servant (died 2008)
  - Sid Ottewell, footballer (died 2012)
- 25 October – Peter Howell, actor (died 2015)
- 28 October – Grahame Vivian, army officer (died 2015)
- 31 October
  - George Boscawen, 9th Viscount Falmouth, politician (died 2022)
  - Daphne Oxenford, broadcast actress (died 2012)
- 3 November
  - Ludovic Kennedy, journalist, broadcaster and writer (died 2009)
  - Peter Morgan, motor-car manufacturer (died 2003)
- 4 November
  - Wilfred Fienburgh, politician (died 1958)
  - Eric Thompson, racing driver (died 2015)
- 10 November – Cliff Ashby, poet and novelist (died 2012)
- 11 November – Hamish Henderson, Scottish poet (died 2002)
- 15 November – Nova Pilbeam, actress (died 2015)
- 16 November – Geoffrey Lilley, aeronautical scientist (died 2015)
- 17 November – Colin Hayes, artist (died 2003)
- 18 November – Norman Cornish, artist (died 2014)
- 19 November – Alan Young, English-born character actor (died 2016)
- 20 November – Lucilla Andrews, Egyptian-born romantic novelist (died 2006)
- 21 November – Martin Aitchison, illustrator (died 2016)
- 23 November – P. F. Strawson, philosopher (died 2006)
- 24 November
  - David Kossoff, actor (died 2005)
  - David Peter Lafayette Hunter, Royal Marines officer (died 2001)
- 26 November
  - Harry Catterick, footballer and manager (died 1985)
  - Noel Coleman, actor (died 2007)
- 29 November – Frank Kermode, literary critic (died 2010)
- 1 December – John Freeborn, World II air ace (died 2010)
- 3 December – Charles Chester, rugby player (died 2011)
- 5 December – Alun Gwynne Jones, Baron Chalfont, politician and historian (died 2020)
- 6 December
  - Eric Newby, travel writer (died 2006)
  - Leonard E. H. Williams, pilot and businessman (died 2007)
- 7 December
  - Frederick Atkinson, civil servant (died 2018)
  - Lyndon Wainwright, metrologist, ballroom dancer and author (died 2018)
- 8 December – Ian Sneddon, mathematician (died 2000)
- 11 December – Cliff Michelmore, broadcast presenter (died 2016)
- 12 December – Cliff Holden, painter and designer (died 2020)
- 14 December – M. R. D. Foot, military historian (died 2012)
- 18 December – Ken Reid, comic artist and writer (died 1987)
- 19 December – Albert Richards, war artist (died 1945)
- 23 December – Peggy Fortnum, illustrator (died 2016)
- 24 December – Charles Wylie, Army officer and mountaineer (died 2007)
- 25 December
  - Noele Gordon, actress (died 1985)
  - Sid Storey, footballer (died 2010)
- 29 December – David Nixon, magician (died 1978)
- 30 December – David Willcocks, choirmaster (died 2015)
- 31 December – Morris Sugden, physical chemist (died 1984)

== Deaths ==
- 2 January – Arthur Gould, Wales international rugby captain (born 1864)
- 3 January – James Hills-Johnes, Indian-born Welsh Victoria Cross recipient (born 1833)
- 12 January – Sir Charles Wyndham, actor-manager (born 1837)
- 18 January – Prince John of the United Kingdom (born 1905)
- 24 February – Edward Bishop, Wales international rugby player (born 1864)
- 26 February – Anne Isabella Thackeray Ritchie, novelist and essayist (born 1837)
- 27 February – Robert Harris, Welsh-born painter (born 1849)
- 20 March – Pauline Markham, English-born vaudeville actress (born 1847)
- 4 April – Sir William Crookes, chemist and physicist (born 1832)
- 12 June – Jeremiah Williams, Coalition Liberal Member of Parliament (MP) for Swansea East (born 1872)
- 14 June – Weedon Grossmith, humorous writer, actor and artist (born 1854)
- 30 June – John William Strutt, 3rd Baron Rayleigh, physicist, Nobel Prize laureate (born 1842)
- 1 July – Sir John Brunner, British industrialist and politician (b. 1842)
- 13 July – Theo Harding, Wales international rugby player (born 1860)
- 26 July
  - Sir Edward Poynter, painter (born 1836)
  - Richard Hughes Williams (Dic Tryfan), Welsh-language writer (born 1878)
- 31 July – Dick Barlow, cricketer (born 1851)
- 11 August – Andrew Carnegie, Scottish-American philanthropist (born 1835)
- 21 August – Laurence Doherty, tennis champion (born 1875)
- 23 August – Augustus George Vernon Harcourt, chemist (born 1834)
- 15 October
  - Howard Colvin, architectural historian (died 2007)
  - Arthur Owen Vaughan (Owen Rhoscomyl), English-born Welsh writer (born 1863)
- 17 October – James Wolfe Murray, British Army general (born 1853)
- 18 October – William Waldorf Astor, 1st Viscount Astor, American-born financier and statesman (born 1848)
- 23 October – Charles Judd, missionary to China (born 1842)
- 25 October – Ernest Albert Waterlow, painter (born 1850)
- 2 December – Sir Evelyn Wood, field marshal and Victoria Cross recipient (born 1838)
- 18 December – Sir John Alcock, aviator, pilot of first nonstop transatlantic flight by aeroplane, June 1919, in aviation accident (born 1892)
- 22 December – Boy Capel, industrialist, polo player, writer, and lover/muse of Coco Chanel (b. 1881)

== See also ==
- List of British films before 1920
