= Marble Church, Bodelwyddan =

Church in Denbighshire, Wales

Coordinates: 53.2667°N 3.4948°W

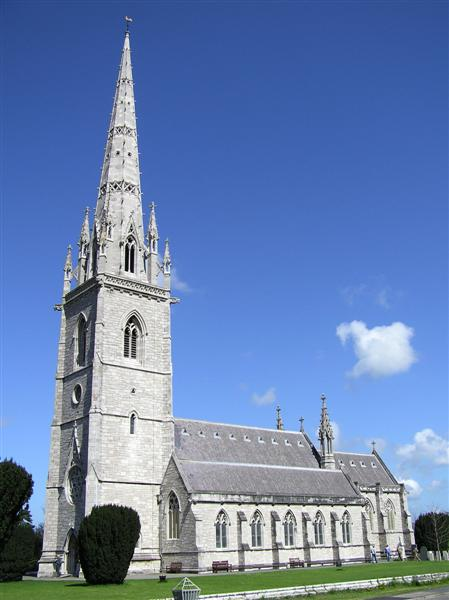
St Margaret's Church

St Margaret's Church, Bodelwyddan, nicknamed the Marble Church, is a Decorated Gothic Style parish church in the lower Vale of Clwyd in Denbighshire, Wales and is visible for many miles because its spire rises to 202 feet. It lies just off the A55 trunk road.

The church was erected by Lady Margaret Willoughby de Broke (daughter of Sir John Williams of nearby Bodelwyddan Castle) in memory of her husband, Henry Peyto-Verney, 16th Baron Willoughby de Broke. She laid the foundation stone on 24 July 1856 and the new church designed by John Gibson was consecrated by the Bishop of St Asaph on 23 August 1860 after construction at a cost of £60,000. The new parish of Bodelwyddan was created on 3 August 1860, from the communities of Bodelwyddan, Faenol and Pengwern, which until that date had been part of the parish of St Asaph. When it was first built, it was nicknamed the 'Pearl of the Vale'.

The church contains fourteen varieties of marble including pillars made of Belgian Red marble, a nave entrance made from Anglesey marble and shafts of Languedoc marble on bases of Purbeck marble. It also contains elaborate woodwork, and in the tower can be found windows of stained glass on the north and south sides, featuring Saint Margaret and Saint Kentigern. It is a popular tourist destination. The church was designated with Grade II* listed status in November 1962.

Until the latter part of the 20th century the church, and in particular its high steeple, was very distinctive because it was so white. With the passage of time, pollution has resulted in the colour becoming more grey, and therefore more like other stone buildings.

Local government reorganisation resulted in the church being in Flintshire until 1974, in Clwyd from 1974 until 1996, and since then in Denbighshire.

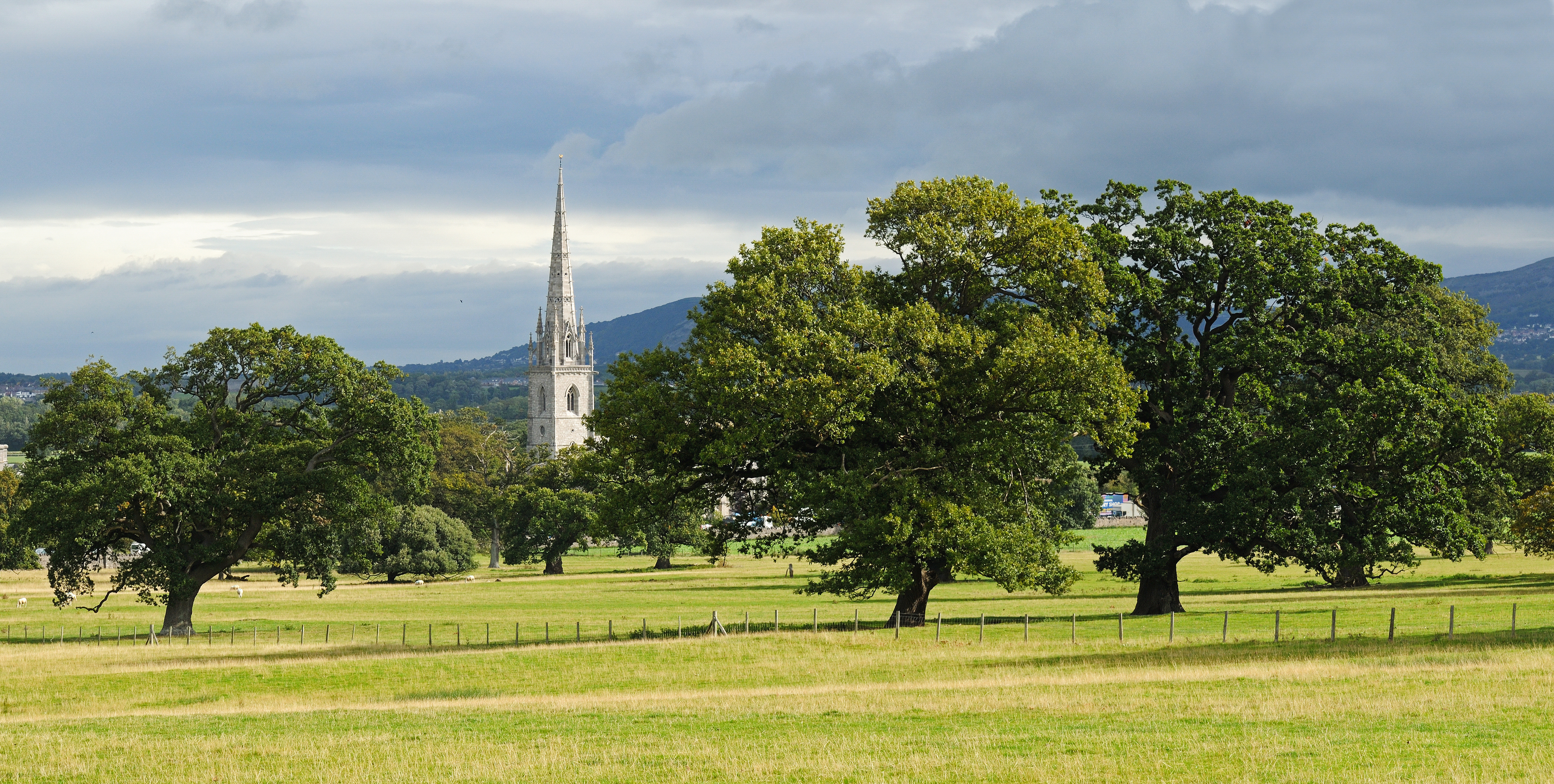
The church viewed from Bodelwyddan Castle

== Churchyard ==
Immediately to the west of the church is Kinmel Camp, which was a military camp located in the grounds of Kinmel Hall. The camp was used by Canadian troops during the First World War. The churchyard contains the graves of numerous victims of the Spanish flu pandemic of 1918–19 in the camp. On 4–5 March 1919 a riot occurred in the camp when the ship allocated to return the troops to Canada was diverted to carry food supplies to Russia. Five Canadian soldiers were killed in the disturbances, four of whom were buried in St Margaret's Churchyard, with the fifth, Gunner John Frederick Hickman, being buried in Dorchester, New Brunswick. A common story is that they were executed for mutiny, but this has been denied by the Canadian Department of National Defence.

In total there are 112 Commonwealth service personnel commemorated here from the First World War. More than 80 of the graves are Canadian, and there are also Special Memorial headstones to four British soldiers who were buried at St Peter's Churchyard in Holywell. There are two war graves of British servicemen from the Second World War. There are multiple post-Second World War graves in the churchyard, including a grave of a Welsh Guards lance corporal who was killed during the Falklands War on board the RFA Sir Galahad.
