= Kinmel Park Training Area =

Army training facility in Conwy County Borough, Wales

Coordinates: 53.265°N 3.529°W

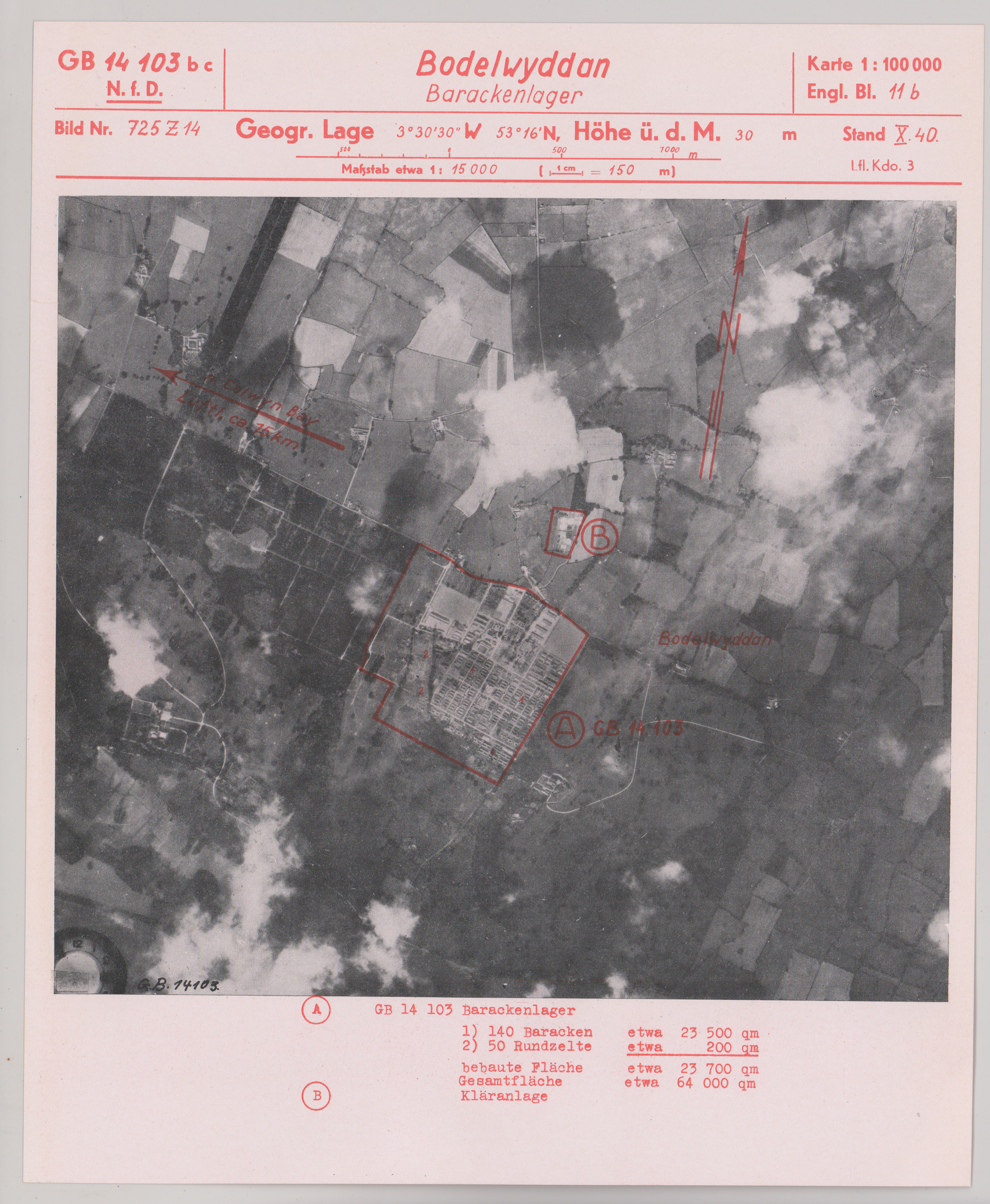
Kinmel Camp on a target dossier of the German Luftwaffe, 1940

Kinmel Park Training Area is an army training ground in what was once the grounds of Kinmel Hall, near Abergele, in Conwy county borough, Wales. The camp was built in 1915 to train troops during the First World War and was later used to house troops at the end of the conflict. A riot broke out in the camp among Canadian forces in 1919, leading to the deaths of several soldiers.

The camp was downscaled after the war, being reduced to around half of its original size.

== History ==
Kinmel Camp was built in 1915, during the First World War, as a military training camp. The camp was built in a valley between two hills, Engine Hill and Primrose Hill south of the village of Bodelwyddan. The site was largely empty prior to the camp's construction with the only man made structures in close proximity being abandoned mining buildings. At the time of its construction, it was the largest army camp in Wales. The site of the camp was around 1.5 kilometres (0.93 mi) by 0.75 kilometres (0.47 mi).

Local residents set up small shops nearby, known as Tintown, where troops could buy basic items. The troops were sometimes given permission to travel by rail to Rhyl for social activities.

The Kinmel Camp Railway served the camp from its construction in 1915 and was later used for a nearby quarry, finally closing in 1964.

=== Riots ===
At the end of the war, thousands of Canadian troops remained in Europe. The military had initially planned to send the forces home at the earliest opportunity. However, considerable numbers of the troops had relatives and friends that lived in Britain and their deployment provided the opportunity to visit, a chance they would otherwise be unlikely to have. The army gave in to these demands and stationed troops at Kinmel Camp during their stay.

The conditions at Kinmel Camp were described as "basic" and the soldiers grew dissatisfied by their conditions after several months. Their chances to be repatriated home were also delayed on more than one occasion when troop carriers, initially designated to them, were used to transport other units home. An outbreak of influenza also claimed the lives of 80 soldiers at the barracks. In early 1919, small instances of looting broke out in the camp before, on 4–5 March 1919, the Kinmel Park mutiny broke out, in which 20,000 war weary soldiers expressed their anger at their treatment. The riot broke out in the Canadian section of the camp, and lasted for a night and a day. Five men were killed, and 23 were injured.

Four of the five Canadian troops killed during the riot were buried in the graveyard of Bodelwyddan church among other Commonwealth War Graves Commission memorials. Most of the war graves are casualties of the Spanish influenza pandemic.

== Later usage ==
The majority of the camp was later demolished and converted into an industrial estate. A small military camp remains at the site, rebuilt to around half the size of the original structure, which contains training grounds and firing ranges and can hold around 250 soldiers. The camp is now occupied by the headquarters of Clwyd and Gwynedd Army Cadet Force and 203 Multi-Role Medical Regiment (previously 203 Field Hospital), RAMC. The camp is also used as a base for military training exercises in Snowdonia National Park.
