= John Gibson (architect) =

English architect

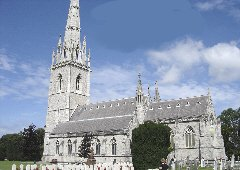
St Margaret's Church, Bodelwyddan, Denbighshire

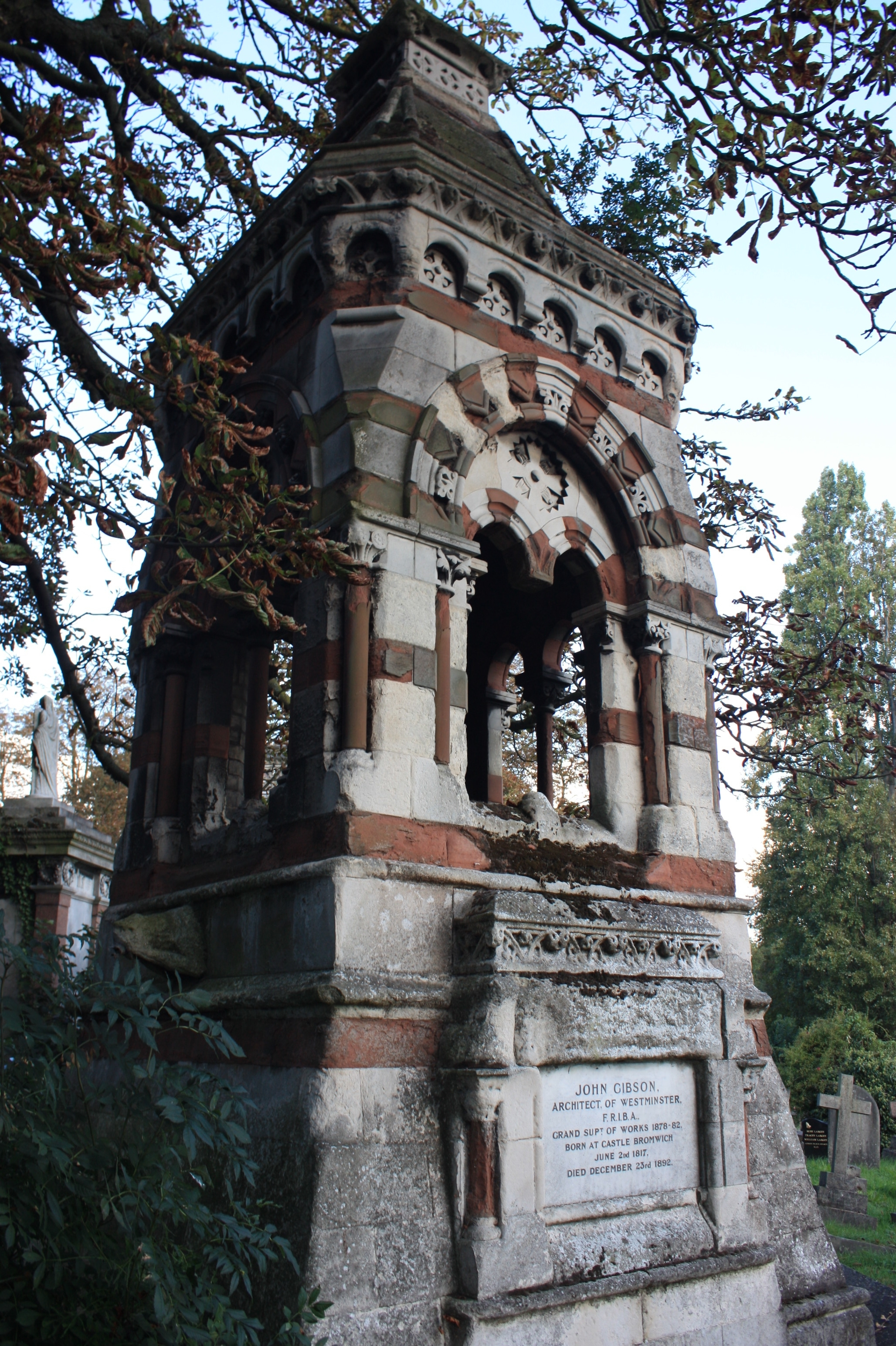
The huge monument to John Gibson in Kensal Green Cemetery

John Gibson (2 June 1817 – 23 December 1892) was an English architect born at Castle Bromwich, Warwickshire.

== Life ==
Gibson was an assistant to Sir Charles Barry and assisted him in the drawings of the Houses of Parliament.

Gibson was a prominent bank architect at a time when joint-stock banking was an innovation. His 1847 National Bank of Scotland branch in Glasgow led to perhaps his best-known work, the former National Provincial Bank in Bishopsgate, London, designed in 1862. It was listed Grade I in 1950 and is now known as Gibson Hall.

Gibson also designed Todmorden Town Hall which opened in 1875, and St. Mary's church in Bersham which opened in January 1876. He also designed Dobroyd Castle in Todmorden and Todmorden Unitarian Church.

Gibson is responsible for several churches in and around North Wales, but perhaps his most notable church is St Margaret's in Bodelwyddan, Denbighshire, more popularly known as the Marble Church, Bodelwyddan, consecrated in 1860. The church is a prominent landmark in the lower Vale of Clwyd and is visible for many miles. It lies just off the A55 trunk road.

In 1890 Gibson was awarded the Royal Gold Medal for services to architecture.

Gibson died of pneumonia on 23 December 1892, at his residence, 13 Great Queen Street, Westminster, and was buried in Kensal Green cemetery on 28 December.

== Gallery ==
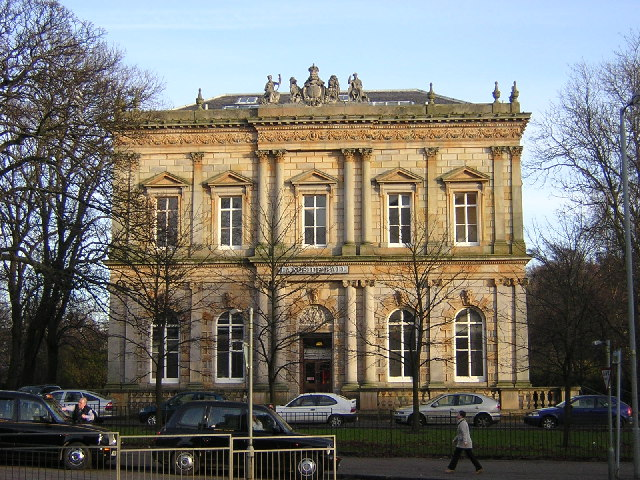
Former National Bank of Scotland Glasgow (now Langside Halls) (1847), the building was moved stone by stone c.1900 to Langside Avenue, Queen's Park, Glasgow

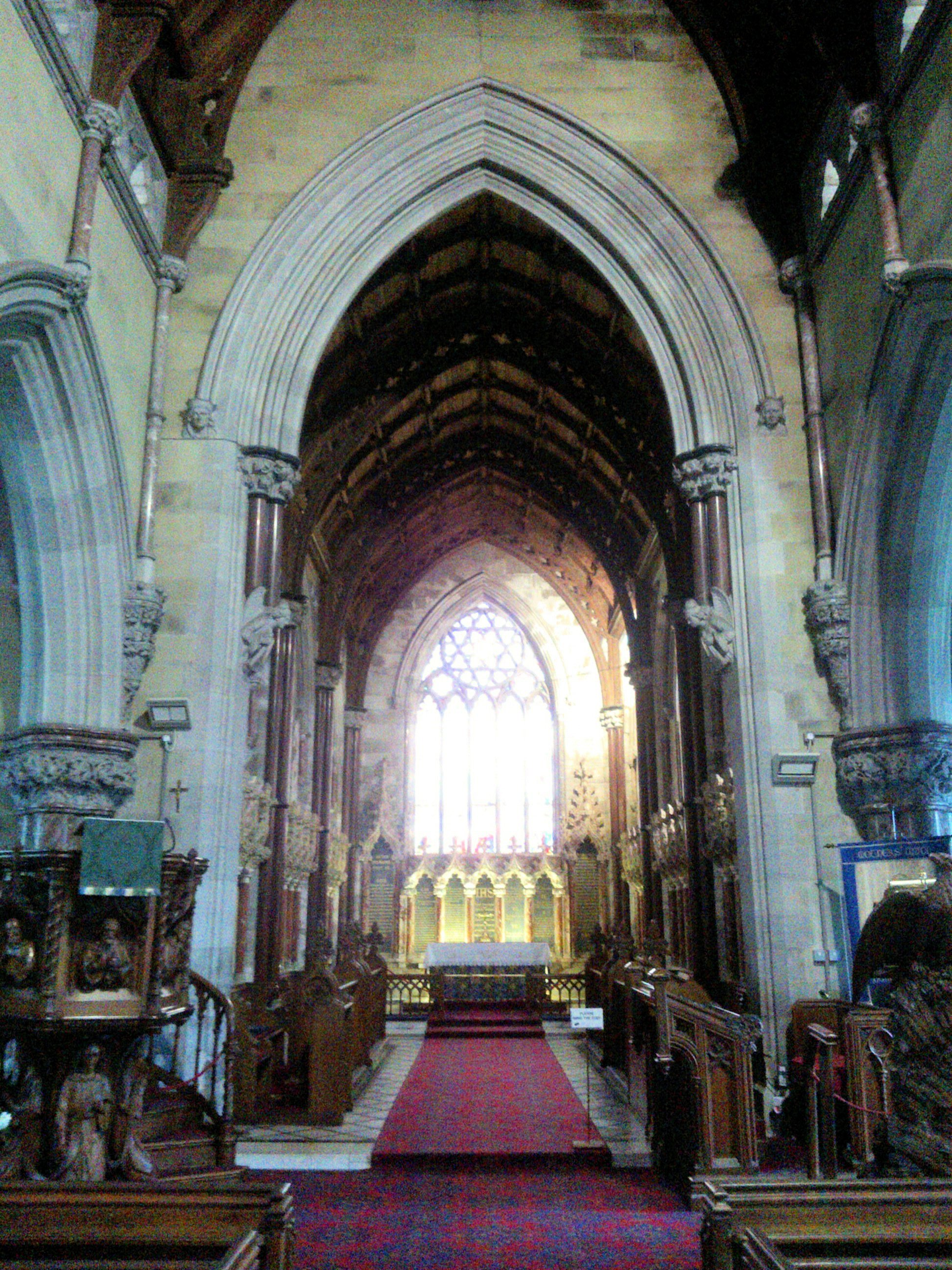
The interior of the Chancel, St. Margaret's in Bodelwyddan (1856–60)

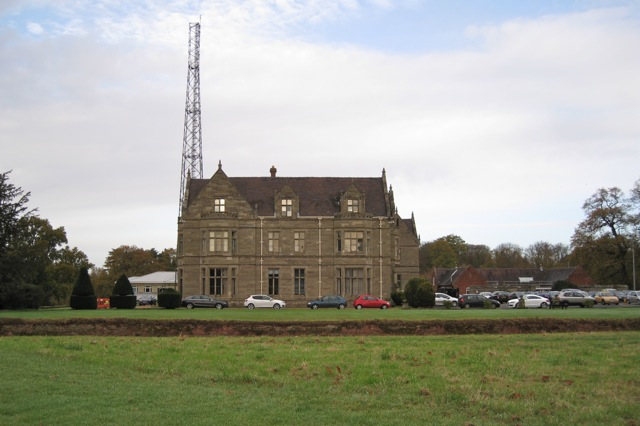
Woodcote House, Leek Wootton, Warwickshire (1861)

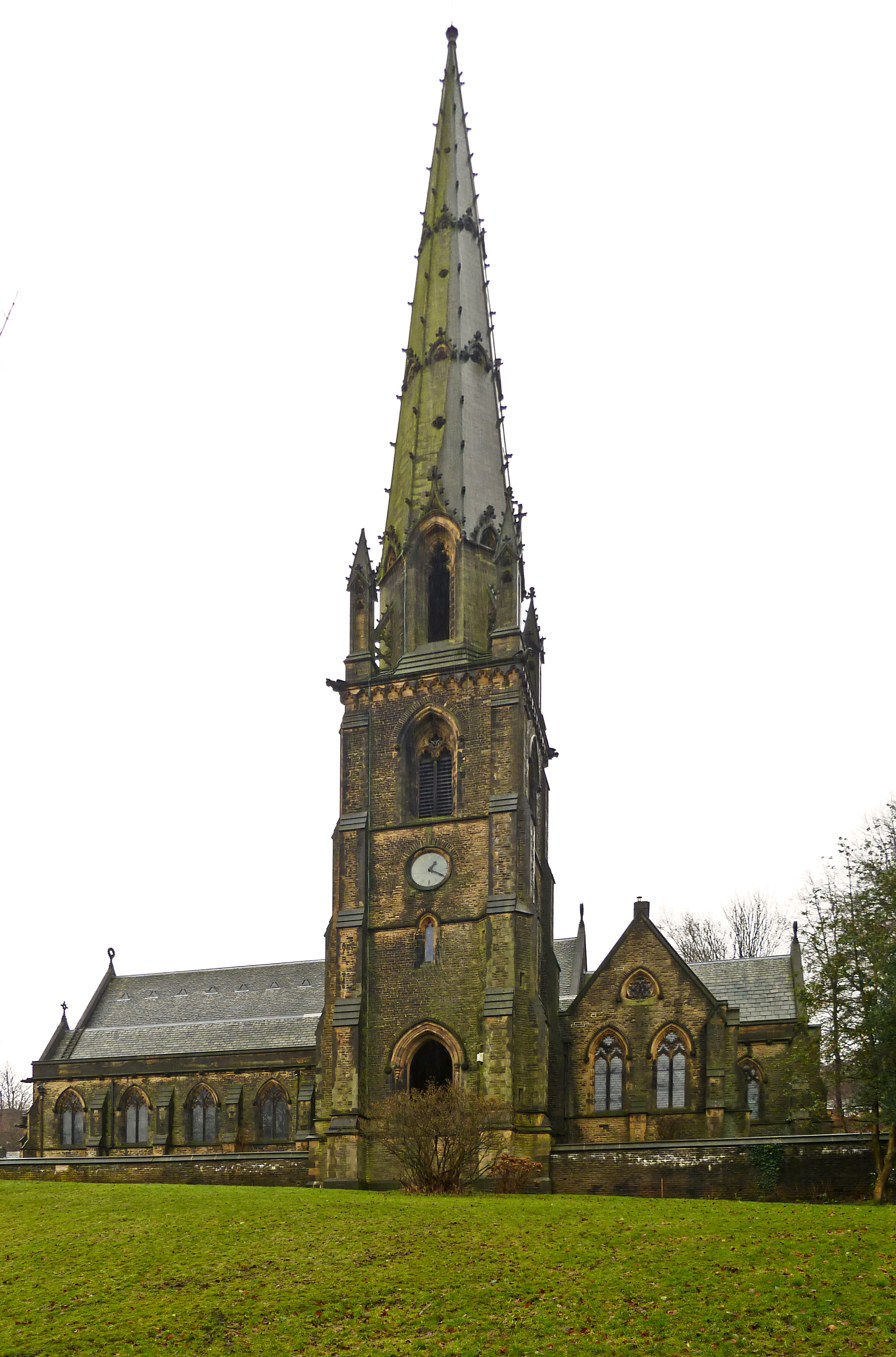
Unitarian Church, Todmorden (1865–69)

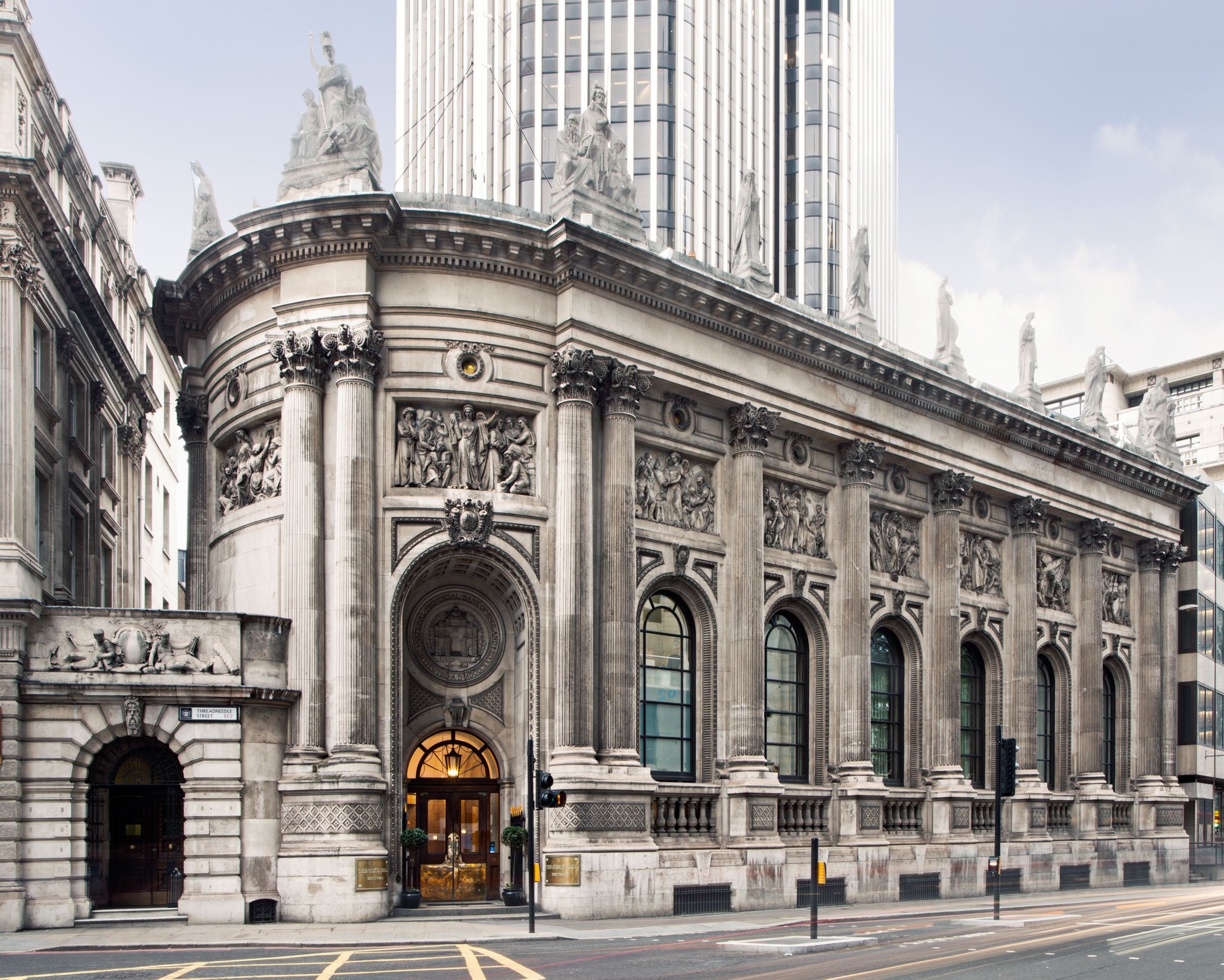
Gibson Hall, former National Provincial Bank, Bishopsgate, London (1864–65)

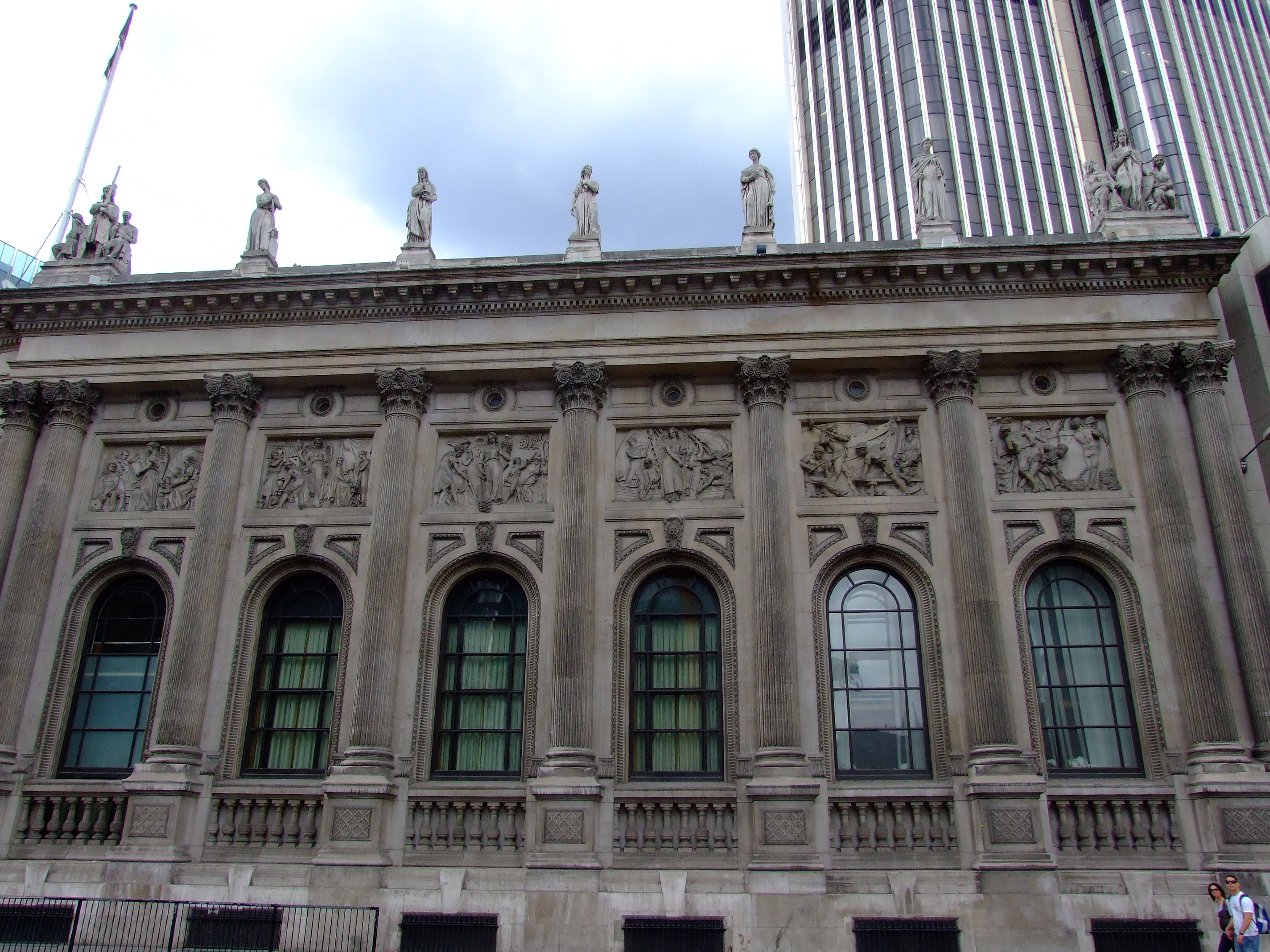
Gibson Hall, former National Provincial Bank, Bishopsgate, London (1864–65)

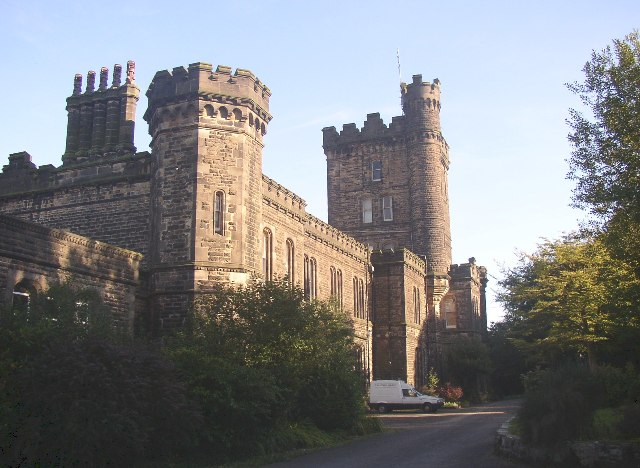
Dobroyd Castle, near Todmorden (1866–69)

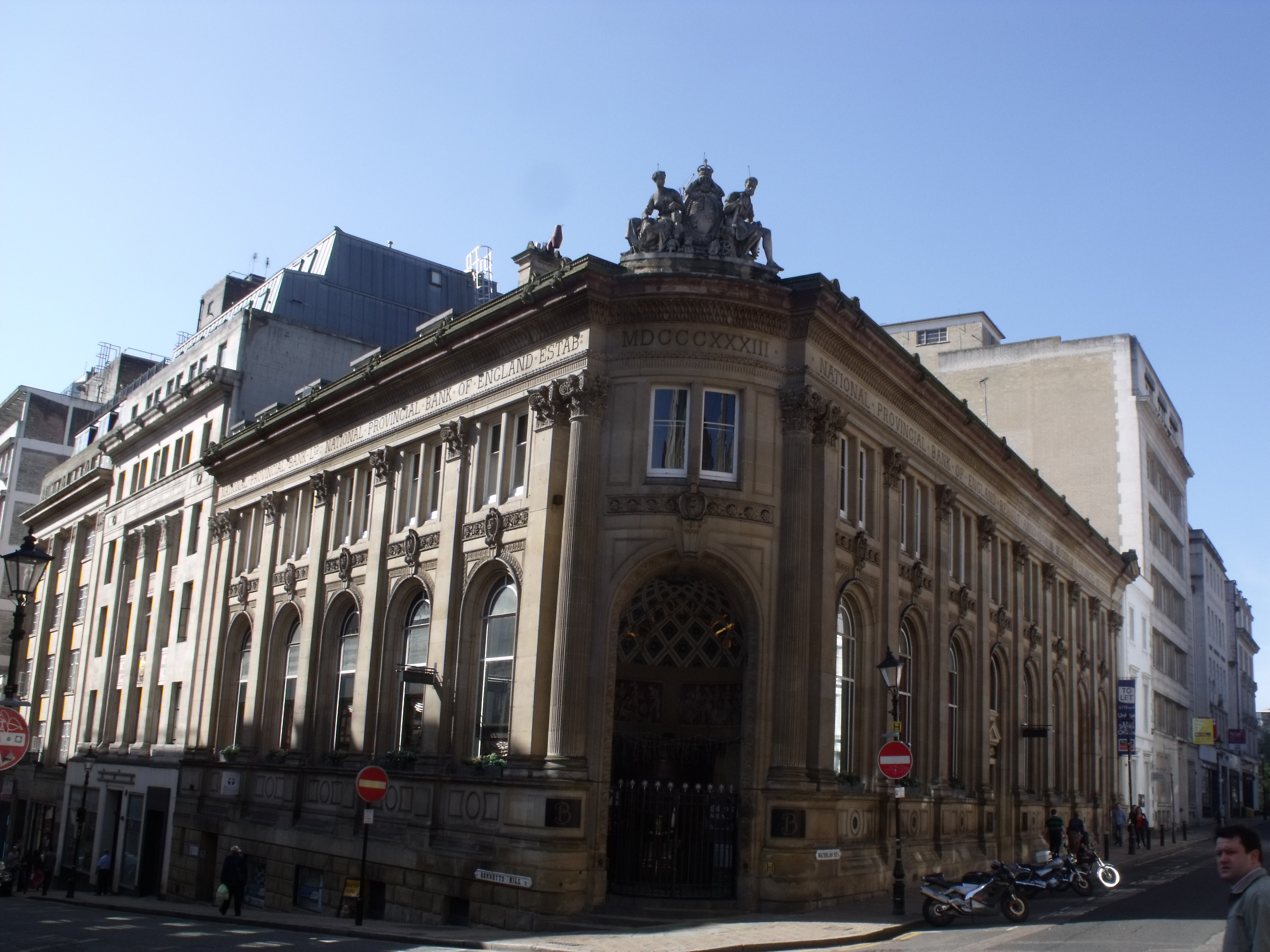
Former National Provincial Bank, Bennetts Hill, Birmingham (1868)

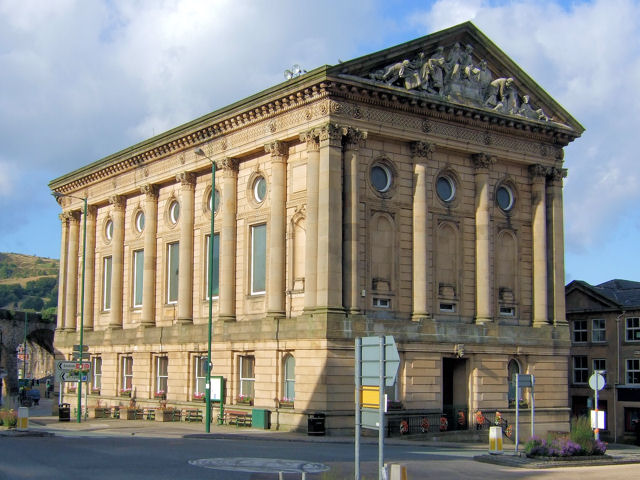
Todmorden Town Hall (1870–75)

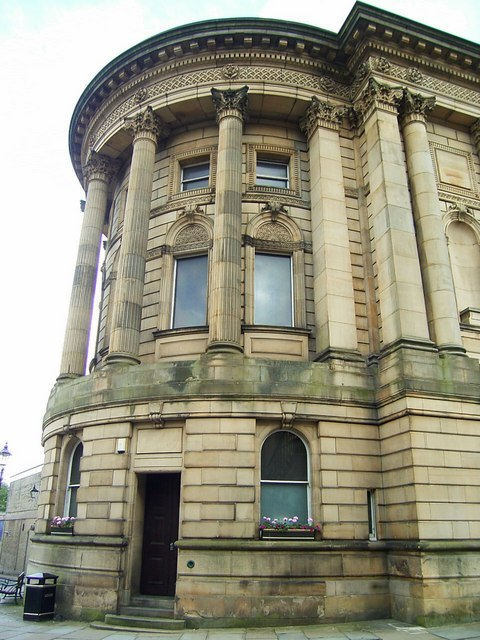
The apse, Todmorden Town Hall (1870–75)

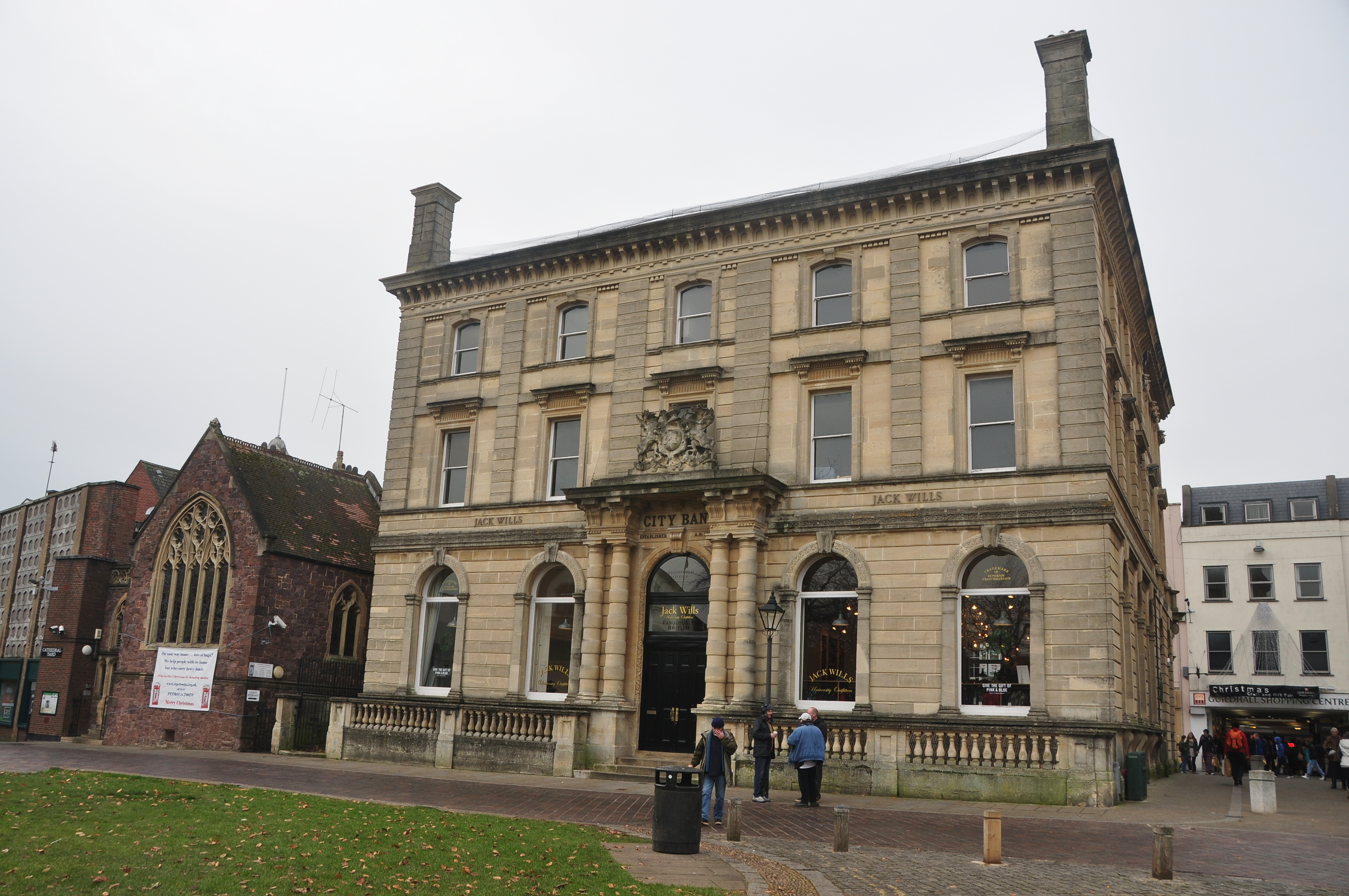
City Bank Exeter (1875)
