= Grahame Vivian =

British officer (1919–2015)

Major John Edgar Grahame Vivian MC and Bar
- John Edgar Grahame Vivian
- Born: 28 October 1919; Camborne, Cornwall
- Died: 10 July 2015 (aged 95); Golant, Cornwall
- Military career
- Allegiance: United Kingdom; Sultanate of Oman
- Branch: Army
- Rank: Major
- Nickname: Father Primus Stove
- Service number: 138129
- Units: Duke of Cornwall’s Light Infantry; Gurkha Rifles; Goorkhas; Oman Gendarmerie; Oman Coastal Patrol
- Conflicts: Second World War; Malaya Emergency
- Awards: Military Cross and Bar (UK); Sultan’s Distinguished Service Medal (Oman)
- Other work: Businessman

Major John Edgar Grahame Vivian MC and Bar (28 October 1919 – 10 July 2015) was a British Army officer who won the Military Cross in Burma in 1944 and again in Malaya in 1956. He later served as an officer in the army of the Sultan of Oman.

== Early life ==
John Edgar Grahame Vivian was born in Camborne, Cornwall on 28 October 1919. His father managed mining companies and the family moved to Burma and Siam to take up work there. He went to school at Repton in Derbyshire and would go on to attend Camborne School of Mines. However, the outbreak of the Second World War curtailed his studies at the mining school.

== Military service ==
=== Second World War ===
Vivian entered the British Army in the Duke of Cornwall’s Light Infantry but was disappointed to be posted close to home. After volunteering for service with the Indian Army, in December 1942 he joined the 4th battalion of the 8th Gurkha Rifles in India. His battalion deployed to Ranchi and to Arakan area of Burma towards the end of 1943.

==== Military Cross Action ====
On 9 January 1944 Vivian was ordered to infiltrate Dhobi Hill which intelligence suggested was lightly defended. However, when Vivian closed on the position he found it to be defended by the Japanese Army in strength. In spite of the enemy strength being greater than anticipated Vivian decided to attack. Once battle had been joined Vivian was knocked over by a mortar shell and received wounds to his chest, stomach and arm. He refused medical treatment and ordered his men to dig in and hold their position in the face of strengthening Japanese resistance. Vivian continued to arrange the defence of the position until he was overcome by his wounds. Two of his men improvised a stretcher from their rifles and carried Vivian for three days back to the regimental base.

His actions saw him awarded the Military Cross, the citation for which read -

His actions throughout the operation were outstanding for resolution, leadership, conspicuous bravery and total disregard for his personal safety.

=== Treatment and Recovery ===
After the battle Vivian was sent to military hospitals in Ranchi and Poona before being evacuated in 1945 to Princess Elizabeth Orthopaedic Hospital in Exeter. In Exeter he underwent several operations, especially on his right hand. For the rest of his life a piece of shrapnel remained in his shoulder and another in his throat (the removal of which was thought too dangerous). Vivian was finally able to leave hospital in February 1946 when he rejoined the Gurkha Rifles at Quetta.

=== Malaya ===
After transferring to the 2nd Ghorkhas in 1947, Vivian served in Malaya and Hong Kong before returning in 1956 to Malaya. There he commanded troops in anti-bandit operations in the Kuala Pilah District of Negri Sembilan.

==== Operation Googly ====
Vivian accompanied a police officer on 28 September 1956 to one of three meetings with a terrorist informant as part of Operation Googly. These meetings yielded intelligence of a meeting between high ranking terrorists. On 2 October, Vivian lead an assault which saw the capture of four leading terrorists.

==== Second Military Cross ====
On 6 October Vivian lead a second assault. Along with two police officers he waited within 60 yards of a terrorist camp for eight hours before making a 40 minute march in darkness to get into position for their attack. The terrorists opened fire with shotguns and automatic weapons but Vivian and the police officers silenced them with two terrorists killed. This actions lead to Vivian being awarded a bar to his Military Cross.

The citation for the award stated -

For courage, determination and successful leadership during a number of actions against Communist terrorists in Malaya. He constantly exposed himself to the greatest risks to ensure success.

— The London Gazette

== Post Army Life ==
=== Civilian Work ===
Vivian retired from the army in 1959, going to work for English China Clays in Cornwall. From there he moved to the Sultanate of Oman to become an officer in the Sultan’s Armed Forces.

=== Sultanate of Oman ===
In Oman, Vivian served as Deputy Commander of the Oman Gendarmerie up to 1965 and Commander Coastal Patrol till 1966. A political appointment followed in 1973 as Djebel Liaison Officer where he reported to Sayyid Fahr bin Taimur Al Said, based at Saiq in the Djebel Al Akhdar mountains. He was known as Abu Primus (Father Primus Stove) as his temper could flare up as quickly as a Primus Stove. Vivian retired in 1985 and was awarded the Sultan’s Distinguished Service Medal.

=== Return to Britain ===
After leaving Oman, Vivian returned to Cornwall where he cared for his wife, who died in 1987. He lived for the next nine years Vivian lived at the family home in Lostwithiel before remarrying and settling in Golant. Vivian was a member of the Regimental Association and contributor to the Gurkha Welfare Trust.

Vivian died at Golant in Cornwall on 10 July 2015.

== Personal life ==
He learned languages and spoke English, Urdu, Gurkhali and Arabic fluently.

Vivian first married Gwen Caswell, to whom he had been engaged for six years, in 1945. Gwen predeceased him 1987 and he remarried in 1996 to Lorna Kirby. He had two sons and a daughter from his first marriage and three step daughters from his second.
