= Maurice Hodgson =

British businessman (1919 – 2014)

- Born: Maurice Arthur Eric Hodgson; 21 October 1919; Bradford
- Died: 1 October 2014
- Occupation: Businessman

Sir Maurice Arthur Eric Hodgson (21 October 1919 – 1 October 2014) was chairman of ICI from 1978 to 1982, and of British Home Stores from 1982 to 1987 and chief executive from 1982 to 1985.

Hodgson was appointed knight bachelor in 1979. He also received an Honorary Doctorate from Heriot-Watt University in 1979.

As chairman, Hodgson felt that ICI needed to increase business in Europe, improve productivity and shift from bulk chemicals to higher value-added products. A fierce efficiency drive led to the loss of 30,000 jobs. His successor John Harvey-Jones carried out many of the changes that Hodgson had initiated.

== Biography ==
Maurice Arthur Eric Hodgson was born in Bradford and educated at Bradford Grammar School. He read Chemistry at Merton College, Oxford and joined ICI at Billingham in 1942. By 1944 he was leading research connected with the Atom Bomb. In the late 50s he was posted to New York for three years. He returned in 1960 to become Research Director of ICI's Heavy Organic Chemicals Division.

As Chairman, Hodgson was hampered by near blindness after a cataract operation: For a time papers were read to him; he obtained a TV system to magnify the text; and he used Speed Reading.

He retired from ICI in 1982 and became chairman and chief executive of British Home Stores. In 1985 this merged with Habitat to become Storehouse and he served on their board until 1989.

In 1984 he attempted to save Dunlop but after a short time its bankers took control.

Hodgson was knighted in 1979. He was awarded the Messel medal of the Society of Chemical Industry and the George E. Davis medal of the Institution of Chemical Engineers. He was elected a Fellow of the Royal Academy of Engineering in 1979.

Hodgson enjoyed watching horse races and became an owner. In 1945 he married Norma Fawcett; she died in 2002. They had a son and a daughter.
