= Kinmel Camp Railway =

Railway in north Wales (1915–1965)

The Kinmel Camp Railway, otherwise known as the Kinmel Park Railway, was a 3-mile (4.8 km) long standard gauge railway built to serve Kinmel Camp near Rhyl in north Wales.

== History ==
Kinmel Camp was a training camp opened by the British Army in 1915 to train soldiers during the First World War. It was connected to the London and North Western Railway line at Foryd station by the short, steep branchline that formed the Kinmel Camp Railway. The KCR opened in 1915. Between 1916 and 1917 a branch was laid to avoid the steepest gradients at the camp terminus. By 1918 a connection had been added to the Vale of Clwyd Railway's line from Rhyl to Denbigh.

After the end of the First World War, the line continued in use serving a quarry near the site of the camp at St. George. The railway continued in this capacity until it closed in 1964 or February 1965, with the track being lifted two months later.
