= Maurice Brown (RAF officer) =

RAF officer

- Born: Maurice Peter Brown; 17 June 1919; London, United Kingdom
- Died: 20 January 2011 (aged 91)
- Military career
- Allegiance: United Kingdom
- Branch: Royal Air Force
- Service years: 1938–1945
- Rank: Squadron leader
- Nickname: Peter
- Units: No. 611 Squadron RAF; No. 41 Squadron RAF
- Conflicts: World War II: Battle of Britain
- Awards: Air Force Cross

Squadron leader Maurice Peter Brown AFC (1919–2011) was a World War II Royal Air Force fighter pilot during the Battle of Britain.

Brown joined the RAF in 1938, and promoted to the rank of flying officer in October 1940. During the Battle of Britain, Brown flew Spitfires with No. 611 Squadron RAF and No. 41 Squadron RAF. During the battle he claimed 3 and 1 shared destroyed, and one shared 'probable'.

Following the Battle of Britain, Brown was a flying instructor at No. 61 OTU Operational Training Unit and Cranwell Flying Training School. He was promoted to flight lieutenant in January 1944 and subsequently to the rank of squadron leader.

He was awarded the Air Force Cross in December 1945. He was released from the RAF in November 1945, retaining the rank of squadron leader.

In 2004, Brown wrote Honour Restored about the Battle of Britain and his exploits and those of his fellow pilots.

Brown was a member of the Battle of Britain Historical Society and unveiled a plaque at Stockport Grammar School to commemorate two Battle of Britain pilots who attended the school.

Brown died on 20 January 2011.

== Works ==
- Honour Restored: Dowding the Battle of Britain and the Fight for Freedom (2005)
