= Geoffrey Lilley =

British aeronautical scientist (1919–2015)

Geoffrey Michael Lilley
- Born: 16 November 1919; Isleworth
- Died: 20 September 2015 (aged 95)
- Occupation: Aeronautical scientist
- Spouse: Lesley Wheeler
- Children: 3

Geoffrey Michael Lilley OBE (16 November 1919 – 20 September 2015) was an aeronautical scientist known for his work on jet engine noise reduction. His pioneering work led to him being known as the 'father of aeroacoustics', and he played a key role in the development of Concorde.

== Life ==
Lilley was born at Isleworth on 16 November 1919, the youngest of four children. His father Micholl Morland Dessau was an American inventor and rubber magnate who lost his fortune in the Great Depression and left the family. Lilley was his mother's maiden name. He married Lesley Wheeler in 1948 and had three children.

After leaving Isleworth Grammar School at 15, he joined the RAF but failed the eye test to be a pilot. Then in 1936 he became an apprentice engineer with Kodak. At Kodak he was assistant to the Chief Engineer, and in 1938 was involved with the design of the air conditioning system for the new Film Coating and Drying Plant, which was installed and operational in June 1939.

== Career ==
In 1940 Lilley joined Vickers-Armstrong at Weybridge and Supermarine in Southampton, where he worked briefly with Sir Barnes Wallace. His work covered both aircraft design and high-speed bombs.

During the War period he served during his time off working with the Home Guard in London and studied for a BSc by evening classes. He was awarded MSc from Imperial College London in 1945. After the war he worked on the design of wind tunnels for commercial research, one of which remains in use by British Aerospace.

Lilley helped found the College of Aeronautics in Cranfield in 1946 and his work on aircraft research led to him being appointed Professor of Experimental Fluid Mechanics in 1961.

In 1963, Lilley was appointed Professor of Aerodynamics and Astronautics at Southampton University.

Lilley was appointed an Officer of the Order of the British Empire (OBE) in the 1981 Birthday Honours for services to government. In 1983 he received the Gold Medal of the Royal Aeronautical Society, and the Aeroacoustic Medal of the American Institute of Aeronautics and Astronautics.

After his retirement in 1983, he continued to accept visiting professorships, and worked for NASA at the Institute for Computer Applications in Science and Engineering.
