= Joe Mitty =

British salesman (1919–2007)

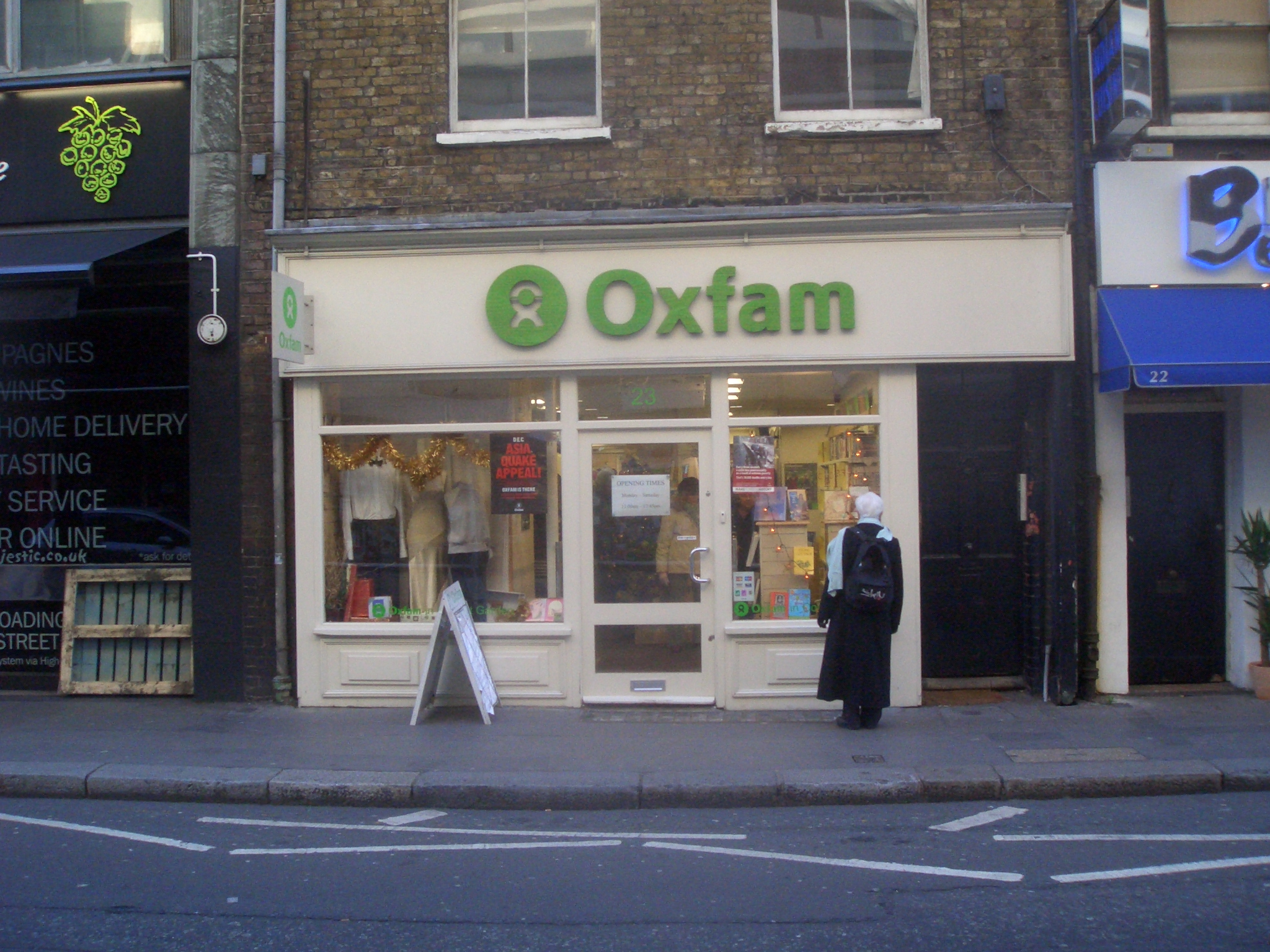
An Oxfam charity shop in Covent Garden, London. Mitty established the first Oxfam charity shop in Oxford.

Joseph Sidney Mitty MBE (7 May 1919 – 30 September 2007) was a British salesman and the man who turned the first Oxfam gift shop into a national retail network of shops selling second hand clothing and other goods. This network put Oxfam on the high street map and has contributed substantially to Oxfam's income as well as presence in the public eye over the years. It was also an inspiration for many charities to follow Oxfam's lead.

Mitty worked for Oxfam for 33 years, earned the nickname of "salesman of the angels".

By 2007, there were over 700 Oxfam shops throughout the UK.

== Early life ==
Joe Mitty was born on 7 May 1919, in Islington, north London. His father, an employee at Royal Arsenal, Woolwich, died when he was twelve years old and he was brought up by his mother. He attended a local Church of England school.

After leaving school, Mitty became a civil service clerk. He joined the British Territorial Army in 1938, before enlisting in the 7th Battalion the Royal Berkshire Regiment in March 1939. in 1942, Mitty was admitted to the Royal Military College, Sandhurst, for officer training, following which he was commissioned as a second lieutenant into the British Army's Hampshire Regiment and was sent to East Asia. On his way to the Far East, Mitty travelled through India, where he was moved by the extreme poverty which he witnessed in the slums of Calcutta.

In 1942, while still serving in the military, Mitty married Dorothy White. The couple had two sons and a daughter. Dorothy died in 1995. His daughter Gloria died in 1989.

Mitty left the Army in 1946 and moved to Oxford with his wife. He purchased a quarter-acre plot of land at Cumnor for £75, and built a house, which he and his wife would live in for the next 60 years. He initially worked for the Ministry of Aircraft Production. However, in 1949 he noticed an employment advertisement in the Oxford Mail newspaper seeking an administrative assistant for the Oxford Committee for Famine Relief, an organization which would later become known by its current name, Oxfam. Mitty decided to apply for this position.

== Oxfam and the Oxfam Charity Shop ==
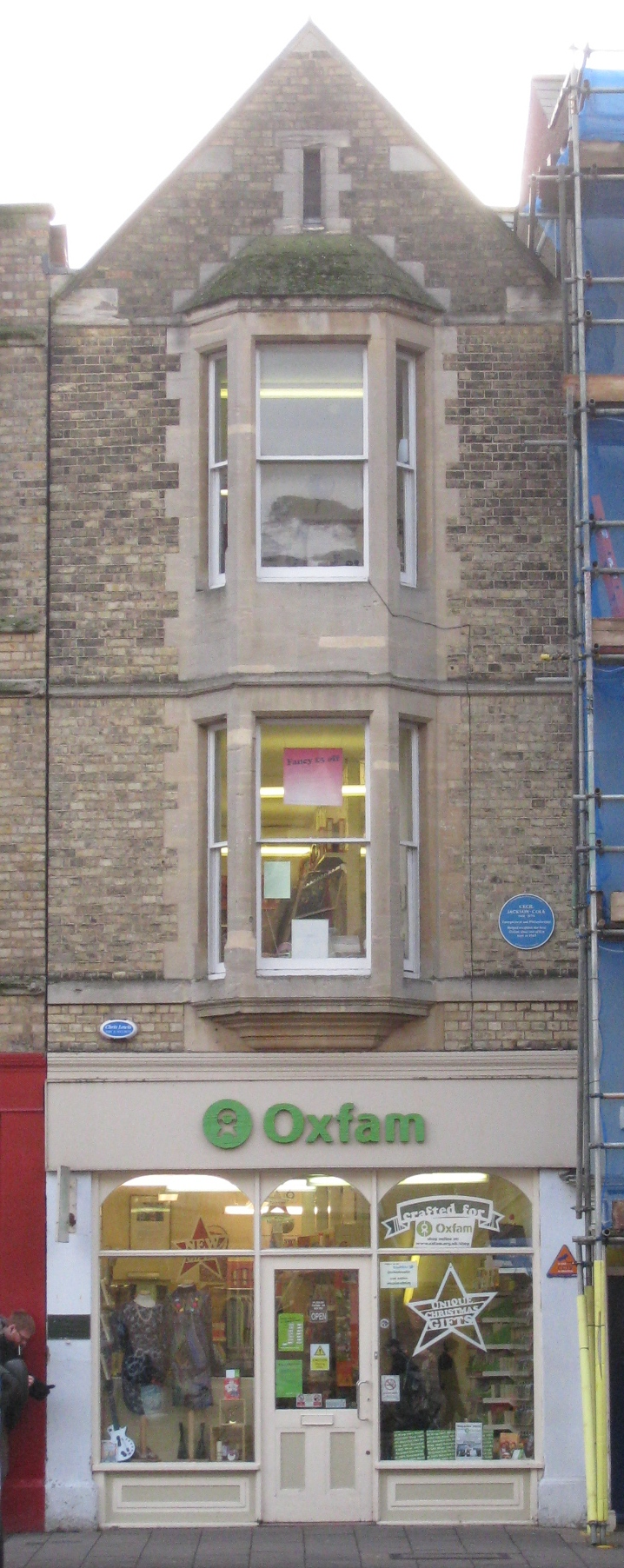
The first Oxfam shop, opened in December 1947 at 17 Broad Street, Oxford

Joe Mitty was hired directly by Oxfam founder, Cecil Jackson-Cole, in 1947. Mitty was instructed to meet Jackson-Cole in the lobby of the Grosvenor Hotel, in Victoria with a handkerchief over his face. He was also told to address anyone who approached him with the question, "Are you Mr Jackson-Cole?" Mitty was hired at the hotel by Jackson-Cole and received a starting salary of a little over £8 per week. This made Mitty Oxfam's first paid employee.

Mitty's initial role at Oxfam was to oversee the distribution of donated clothing to Europeans who had been left impoverished during World War II. However, Oxfam soon saw an untapped financial potential in selling the donated clothing rather than just sending the donations to Europe. This would allow Oxfam "to become a shop that sold everything but bought nothing," to quote The Telegraph. Proceeds from the sales of the donated goods would be used to fund Oxfam's charitable goals.

Mitty's motto for the first gift shop was "If you donate it, we can sell it." The shop took £500 during its first year of operation, but by 1953 its annual profits were £10,000.

Mitty's success with the first Oxfam shop gave him the opportunity to oversee and open several more charity shops throughout Britain by the early 1960s. His growing success at Oxfam allowed him to recruit a number of celebrities including Harry Secombe who helped to draw attention to Oxfam's work. By 1971, Mitty's Oxfam charity shops were making over £1 million and had become the largest charity shop chain in the country.

Joe Mitty officially retired from Oxfam in 1982, though he continued to work as an Oxfam ambassador. In 2006, he appeared with Victoria Beckham at an Oxfam charity shop in Notting Hill where she presented him with an award and he sold her a black dress for £19.99 as part of a campaign to draw attention to Oxfam's work. He also worked with the 20,000 volunteers who run Britain's over 700 Oxfam charity shops.

Mitty was awarded an MBE in 2003 for his work with the Oxfam charity shops and service to Oxfam. In 2006, the then prime minister, Tony Blair, presented Mitty with a lifetime achievement award at the TV-Daily Mirror Pride of Britain event. Blair declared to the audience that if Mitty had worked in the private sector he would have been a multi-millionaire. Carol Vorderman called Mitty "the grandfather of British charity shops" at the same awards.

== Death ==
Joe Mitty died on 30 September 2007 at the age of 88.
