= Bodelwyddan =

Village in Denbighshire, Wales

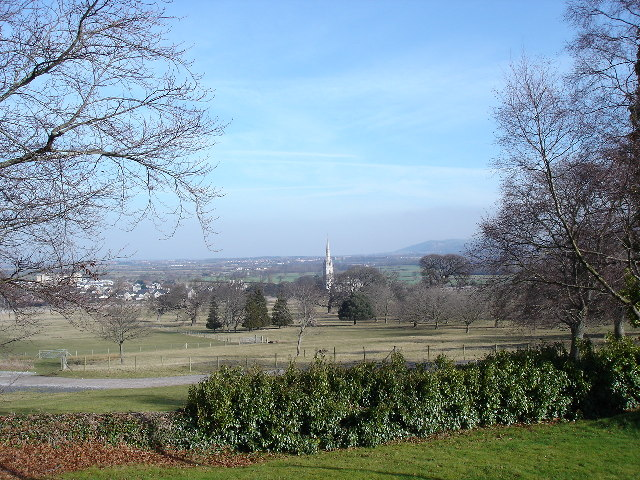

- Location within Denbighshire
- Population: 2,147 (2011)
- OS grid reference: SJ0075
- Community: Bodelwyddan
- Principal area: Denbighshire
- Preserved county: Clwyd
- Country: Wales
- Sovereign state: United Kingdom
- Post town: ST. ASAPH
- Postcode district: LL17
- Post town: RHYL
- Postcode district: LL18
- Dialling code: 01745
- Police: North Wales
- Fire: North Wales
- Ambulance: Welsh
- UK Parliament: Clwyd North
- Senedd Cymru – Welsh Parliament: Vale of Clwyd
- List of places UK Wales Denbighshire 53.268°N 3.499°W Map of the community

Bodelwyddan (Welsh pronunciation: [bɔdɛlˈwəðan]) is a village, electoral ward and community in Denbighshire, Wales, approximately 5 miles (8 km) south of Rhyl. The parish includes several smaller hamlets such as Marli and Little Pengwern.

Bodelwyddan is home to over sixty listed buildings including notable locations such as the Marble Church and Bodelwyddan Castle.

The population of only 2,106, increasing to 2,147 at the 2011 census, is served by a single public house, a small number of shops, two takeaways (a Chinese takeaway called The Lucky Garden and the fish and chips shop ‘Church View Chippy’), a primary school and a driving range; as well as having its own community centre.

It is now bypassed by the A55 road, but continues to be a hub of activity due to the presence of Glan Clwyd Hospital. It has a town council with a mayor.

== History ==
The name "Bodelwyddan" translates as Abode (Bod) of Elwyddan, he being a fifth-century Romano-British Chieftain of the area.

While Bodelwyddan may not have a long and notable history, it does contain many historic buildings, and has been the site of several important military training exercises during the two World Wars.

Until 1860, Bodelwyddan was a part of the parish of St Asaph, before being gazetted as a new and separate parish on 3 August, following the construction of the Marble Church.

During the two World Wars, the nearby Kinmel Camp was used to house soldiers, and was the location of the Kinmel Park Riots in 1919, which led to several Canadian deaths.

Historically, Bodelwyddan was home to a lead mine, but plans to abandon the mine were submitted in 1857 and the mine closed shortly thereafter. The nearby "Engine Hill" was named after the mine engines designed to keep the mine's water problems under control. Engine Hill has four "main" engine shafts with multiple smaller shafts; however, the majority of knowledge on earlier working has been lost.

The A55 road Bodelwyddan bypass was completed in 1986, and has been fundamental in shaping the changing Bodelwyddan, being at least partially responsible for the Local Development Plan and the continued existence of Ysbyty Glan Clwyd.

=== Local Development Plan ===
In 2010, it was made public that Denbighshire County Council's Local Development Plan (LDP) had allocated over 1,700 new houses to be built in Bodelwyddan.

Following the announcement, the proposal has been heavily opposed by locals including Conwy County Borough Council, who said "No evidence has been presented by Denbighshire County Council providing details of the likely impact on services generally in Conwy County (especially Health and Education)"

According to forecasts, the population of Bodelwyddan would be expected to rise significantly until 2021, potentially tripling the population.

In 2011 a referendum was held by the Town Council on the topic, with a resounding 94% against result. Despite the clear and near-unanimous opposition, the decision was made to go ahead with the plan, following a split vote by Denbighshire County Council.

== Geography ==
To its South lies Bodelwyddan Castle, which sits on Engine Hill - so named for the Steam Engines that drove the mining operations that took place there in the past.

In the area surrounding Bodelwyddan lie small farms, including two farm shops. Also nearby are several hamlets - including: Cefn Meiriadog, Marli, Llannefydd and Pengwern.

== Demographics ==
At the time of the 2001 census, the Usual Resident Population numbered 1,802, of which 915 (50.8%) were male and 887 (49.2%) were female.

With a density of just 20.95 people per hectare, Bodelwyddan is one of the most sparsely populated towns or villages in North Wales that is not classified as a hamlet.

== Notable landmarks ==
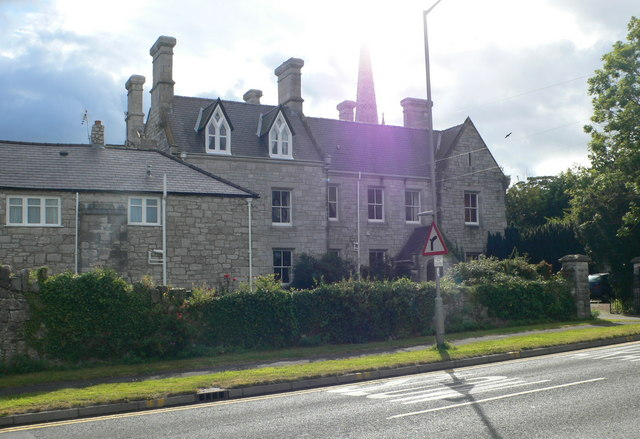
Bodelwyddan Church Vicarage

Bodelwyddan has over sixty listed buildings within its boundary. Bodelwyddan Castle and the Faenol Fawr are two of the oldest buildings.

Notable buildings include the Marble Church, built by John Gibson in the 1850s; Bodelwyddan Castle, now used as a branch of the National Portrait Gallery; and Glan Clwyd Hospital, the major hospital for central North Wales.

=== Bodelwyddan Castle ===
Bodelwyddan Castle, built around 1460 as a manor house is one of the most obvious buildings on the Bodelwyddan skyline, both at day and at night. Being of a more recent vintage than most other nearby castles, Bodelwyddan Castle is well preserved. Today, Bodelwyddan castle is used primarily as a hotel and art gallery, but in the past has served other functions, such as being a private school for girls between 1920 and 1982.

=== Faenol Fawr ===
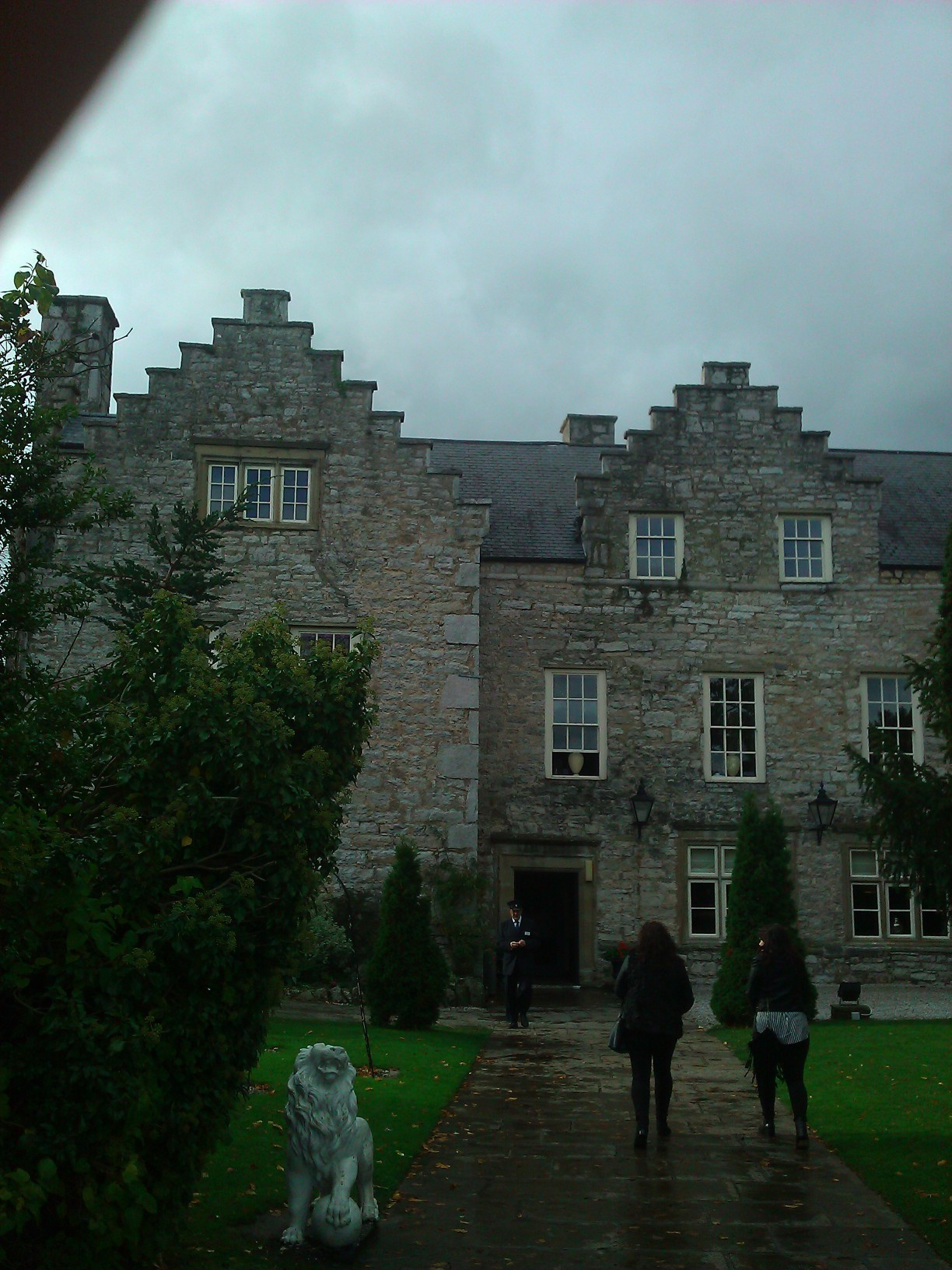
Faenol Fawr

Faenol Fawr was built in 1597 as a country house for John Lloyd, registrar for the St Asaph diocese. Dormer windows with stepped gables were installed as part of an 18th-century renovation. It is now a country house hotel. It is a grade II* listed building.

=== Glan Clwyd Hospital ===
Glan Clwyd Hospital (Welsh: Ysbyty Glan Clwyd) is one of the largest hospitals in North Wales, and is the major hospital for Central North Wales. Until 2007, it served as the headquarters of the Conwy & Denbighshire NHS Trust, prior to the mergers that took place to form the Betsi Cadwaladr University Health Board.

Serving a population of approximately 195,000, with over 675 beds, it brings much traffic through Bodelwyddan and benefits from Bodelwyddan's good traffic links and proximity to the A55 Road.

=== Kinmel Camp ===
Kinmel Camp is an army training base, that dates from 1915, during the First World War. The Kinmel Camp Railway served the camp up until 1964, and the camp is home to several First World War practice trenches, dug by recruits; now legally protected poignant examples of pristine trenches from that era.

In the 1919 Kinmel Park Riots, five Canadian soldiers perished; There have been other tragic events in Kinmel Park history, including the death of many soldiers in the 1918 flu pandemic.

=== Marble Church ===
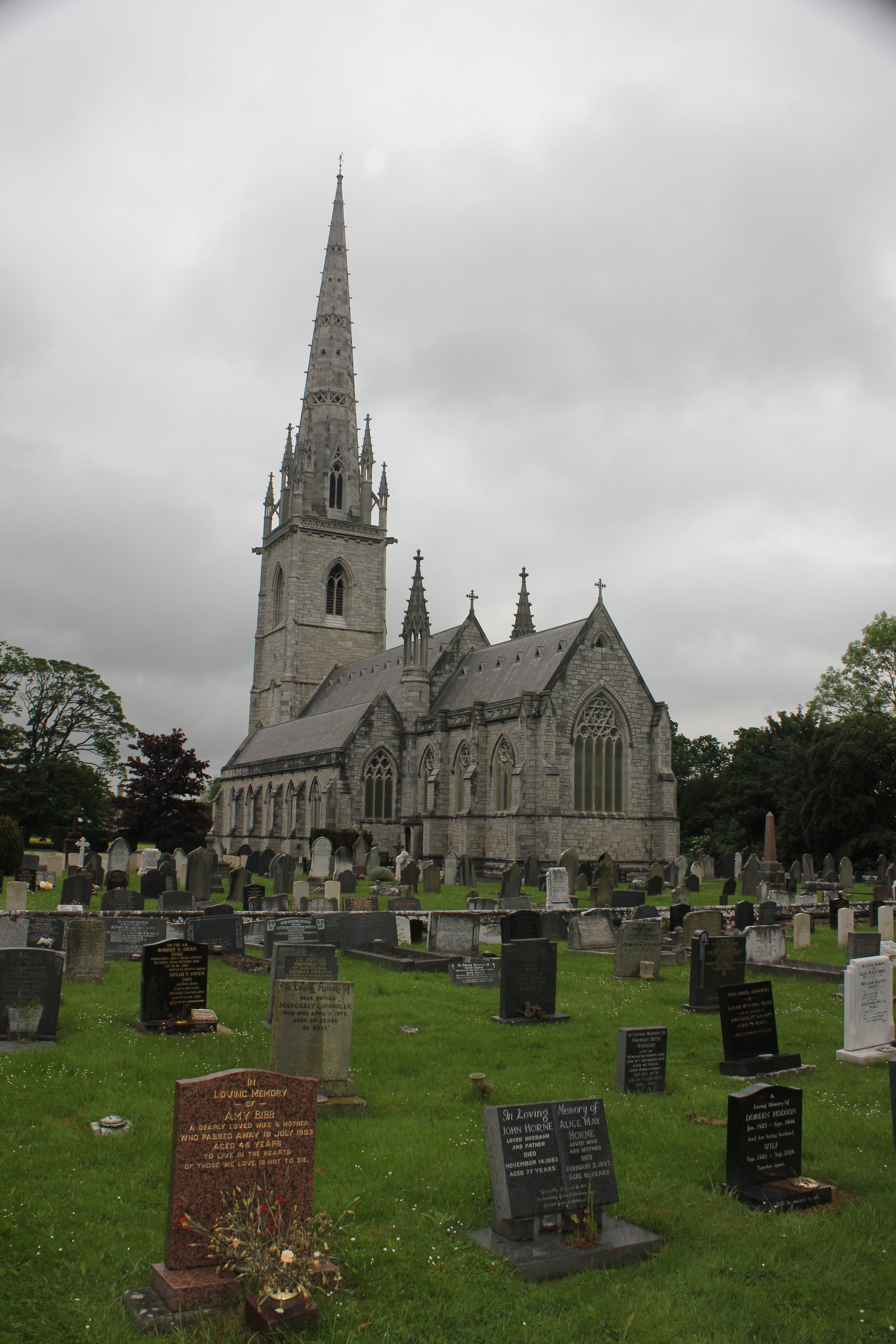
Marble Church, Bodelwyddan

St Margaret's Church, better known as 'The Marble Church', is clearly visible from a great distance up and down the A55 road and was erected between 1856 and 1860, and was built with local Limestone, sourced from nearby Llanddulas, whose appearance closely resembles porcelain.

The Church is dedicated to two Saints, Margaret and Kentigern, and contains several notable graves - including the grave of Elizabeth James, mother of Sir Henry Morton Stanley, a renowned Victorian Explorer. It is also home to the graves of over eighty Canadian soldiers, dating to 1918 and 1919.

== Education ==
The local primary school is Ysgol y Faenol, which primarily feeds into Ysgol Glan Clwyd in St Asaph and Ysgol Emrys Ap Iwan in Abergele.

== Notable residents ==
- Mayzee Davies - footballer for the Wales national team
- Jade Jones - 2012 and 2016 Olympic taekwondo gold medalist was born in the town
- Phil Salt - cricket player for The England and Wales Cricket Board
