= John Pott (British Army officer) =

- Born: 14 July 1919; Khartoum, Anglo-Egyptian Sudan
- Died: 23 April 2005 (aged 85)
- Military career
- Allegiance: United Kingdom
- Branch: British Army
- Rank: Major
- Units: King's Own Royal Regiment (Lancaster); Parachute Regiment
- Conflicts: Second World War: Western Desert campaign; Allied invasion of Italy; Battle of Arnhem
- Awards: Member of the Order of the British Empire; Military Cross

Major Robert Laslett John Pott MBE MC (14 July 1919 – 23 April 2005) was a British Army officer who, during World War II, served as Commanding Officer of A Company, 156th Battalion, Parachute Regiment, in the Battle of Arnhem, part of Operation Market Garden, in September 1944. Sixty-five years after the Battle of Arnhem, John Pott's story became more widely known because of a song written about him by his grandson, Joel Pott, lead singer of the Ivor Novello Award winning indie rock band Athlete.

== Early life ==
John Pott was born on 14 July 1919 in Khartoum in Anglo-Egyptian Sudan, where his father was serving with the Sudan Defence Force. He was educated at Wellington College and then went to the Royal Military College, Sandhurst. On 1 July 1939, he was commissioned as a second lieutenant in the King's Own Royal Regiment (Lancaster) and was posted to join the regiment's 1st Battalion in British India.

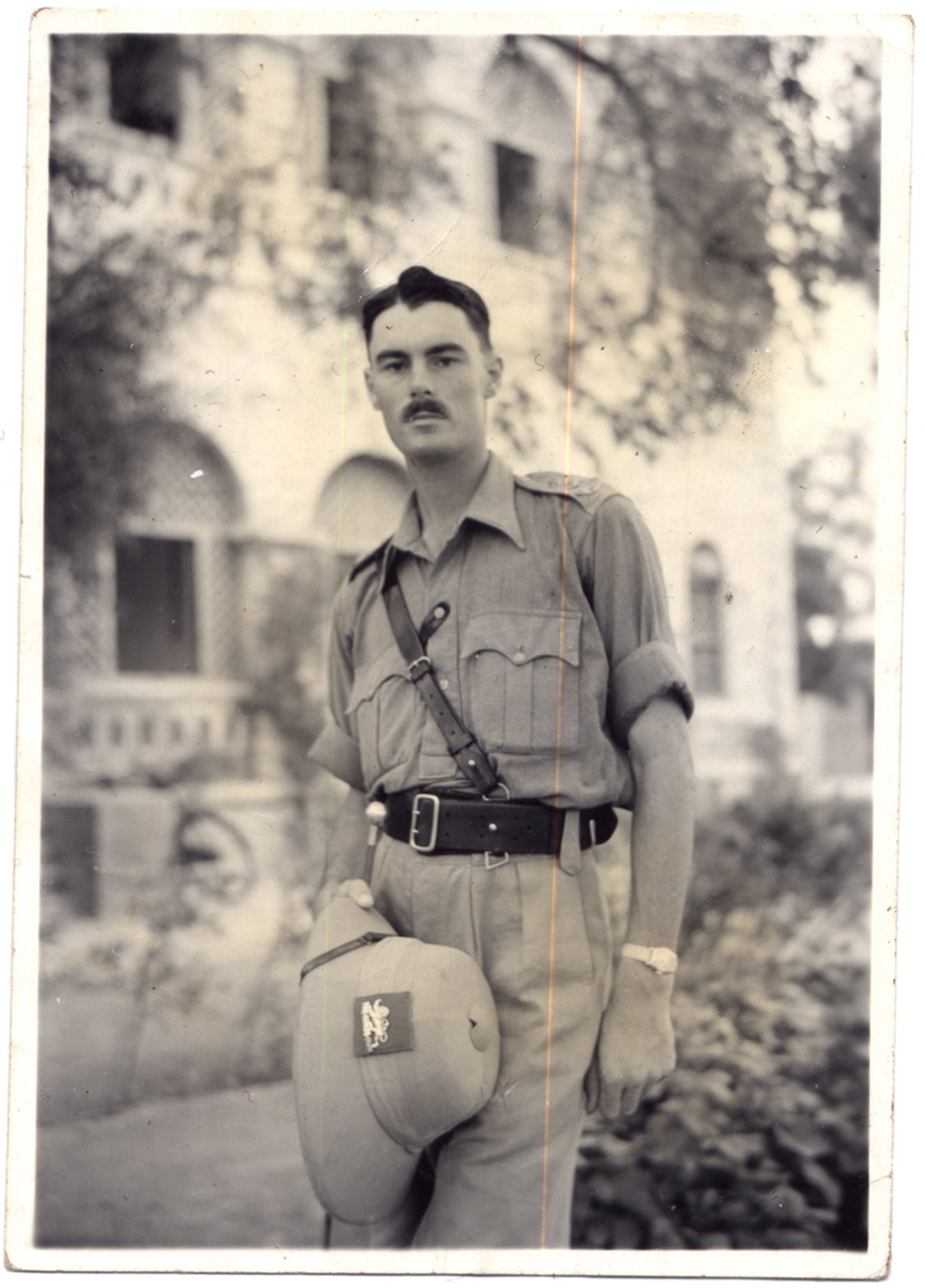

== Second World War ==
In India Pott met Anna Frost and they married in 1941. On the day of their marriage, Pott was called to the frontline and they did not see each other for eighteen months. He had been promoted to lieutenant on 1 January 1941. His battalion was sent to the Middle Mediterranean and Middle East Theatre, and he served—and was wounded—in the Western Desert campaign in 1942. Later in the year the battalion was being shipped to Cyprus and their transport was torpedoed.

=== Italy ===
In 1943 Pott joined the Parachute Regiment. Posted to 156 Battalion as an acting major and given command of A Company, he took part in the Allied invasion of Italy. The day after leading his company into action for the first time, he was ordered to capture two German-held farmhouses. To take the first position, he had to lead his men up a narrow ravine which was swept by fire from German positions, and then cross flat, open ground to the farm house itself. The company took the objective, but Potts now had only 15 men with him. Despite this, he elected to press the attack on the second farmhouse. The attack was held up at a sunken lane, but he managed to gather up some other members of the company, and successfully took the second objective as well. He was recommended for the Military Cross by the brigade commander, John Hackett, his citation concluded:

The inspiring leadership of this officer and the firm example of his personal courage which he gave his men, was largely responsible for the successful conclusion of an important little engagement.

The award of Pott's MC was gazetted on 13 January 1944.

=== Arnhem ===
On Monday 18 September 156 Battalion parachuted into Arnhem. After an opposed landing, the battalion moved off at about 5pm, but A Company, still led by Pott, was without its 3rd Platoon who had remained on the dropzone to protect casualties. The battalion halted north of Oosterbeek for the night and resumed their advance the following morning. Pott was particularly keen to reach Arnhem road bridge for it was his brother-in-law, Lieutenant-Colonel John Frost, who was commanding the small force defending it. This determination was further reinforced by Hackett, who impressed upon Pott and 156 Battalion's commanding officer, Lieutenant-Colonel Sir Richard des Voeux, the urgent need to reinforce the bridge. To make up for the missing platoon, A Company were reinforced with a platoon of Glider Pilots.

C Company led the advance towards a small hill known as the Koepel, and made good progress through abandoned German positions. Pott then led A Company around C Company's left flank, towards a road along which German infantry and armour were dug in. The Glider Pilots, became separated from the rest of the company and soon the two surviving platoons were decimated by heavy machine gun fire. Pott led a charge across the open road, but only a handful of men were able to cross safely, and Pott led them into the cover of the woods. At least three of the men were badly wounded, and Pott was forced to leave them behind before he pressed on towards the objective. One of the men, Sergeant George Sheldrake, recalls that Pott then prayed for the men, "for a couple of minutes maybe, although there was some mortar and machine gun fire... It is something I shall never forget."

To Pott's surprise, he was able to lead his men onto their first objective – Liechtenbeek Hill – and managed to dig in with his small force before the first counterattack. The men waited until the Germans were extremely close before opening fire, and the Germans withdrew. When they made a second counterattack, Pott's men, now very short of ammunition, tried to charge into the flank of their assault, but Pott was hit and wounded. Some of his men were able to escape as the Germans overran the hill, and the walking wounded were led away. Pott was too badly wounded to walk – one bullet had hit his hand and another had smashed his thigh. Pott recalled that a "fine looking unteroffizier" told him "sorry we can't see to you now, but your chaps will be back soon anyway." Instead, Pott lay on the hill for 18 hours. He attempted to write a letter to his wife with his left hand before he was picked up by two Dutch stretcher bearers and eventually taken to hospital in Arnhem, where he was rounded up by the Germans. After he was transferred to a hospital in Germany, he escaped on crutches and swam across a river to the Netherlands where he was recaptured and then taken to a POW camp until the end of the war.

== Later life ==
After the war, Pott's career in the army included time in India, Italy, Cyprus during the Suez Crisis, the Sudan, where like his father he served with the Sudan Defence Force, Trucial Oman (now the United Arab Emirates) and Germany. He had a strong attachment to the Sudan and after he retired from the army he worked there again with the Christian relief agency Tearfund. Pott was known throughout his life as a deeply committed Christian.

Pott and his wife lived for many years in a cottage in the Spey Valley and raised four sons. He died on 23 April 2005.

== Black Swan song and documentary ==
Sixty-five years after the Battle of Arnhem, Pott's story became more widely known because of a song written about him by his grandson, Joel Pott, lead singer of the indie rock band Athlete. The song called Black swan song refers to Pott's courageous approach to death and has references to Arnhem. In the music video for Black Swan Song, the director, Mark Locke, shows Pott writing a letter to his wife Anna as he lies wounded in battle near Arnhem. In addition, a documentary called Black swan story featuring Joel Pott and his father following the route his grandfather took at Arnhem was produced by Richard Edkins. An 11-minute edit of the film was shown on Channel 4 on 6 November 2009, and will be featured in the Royal British Legion's Remembrance Day educational resources for schools in September 2010. On Monday 9 November 2009 the full 43-minute film was streamed live by Livestream in partnership with the Royal British Legion.

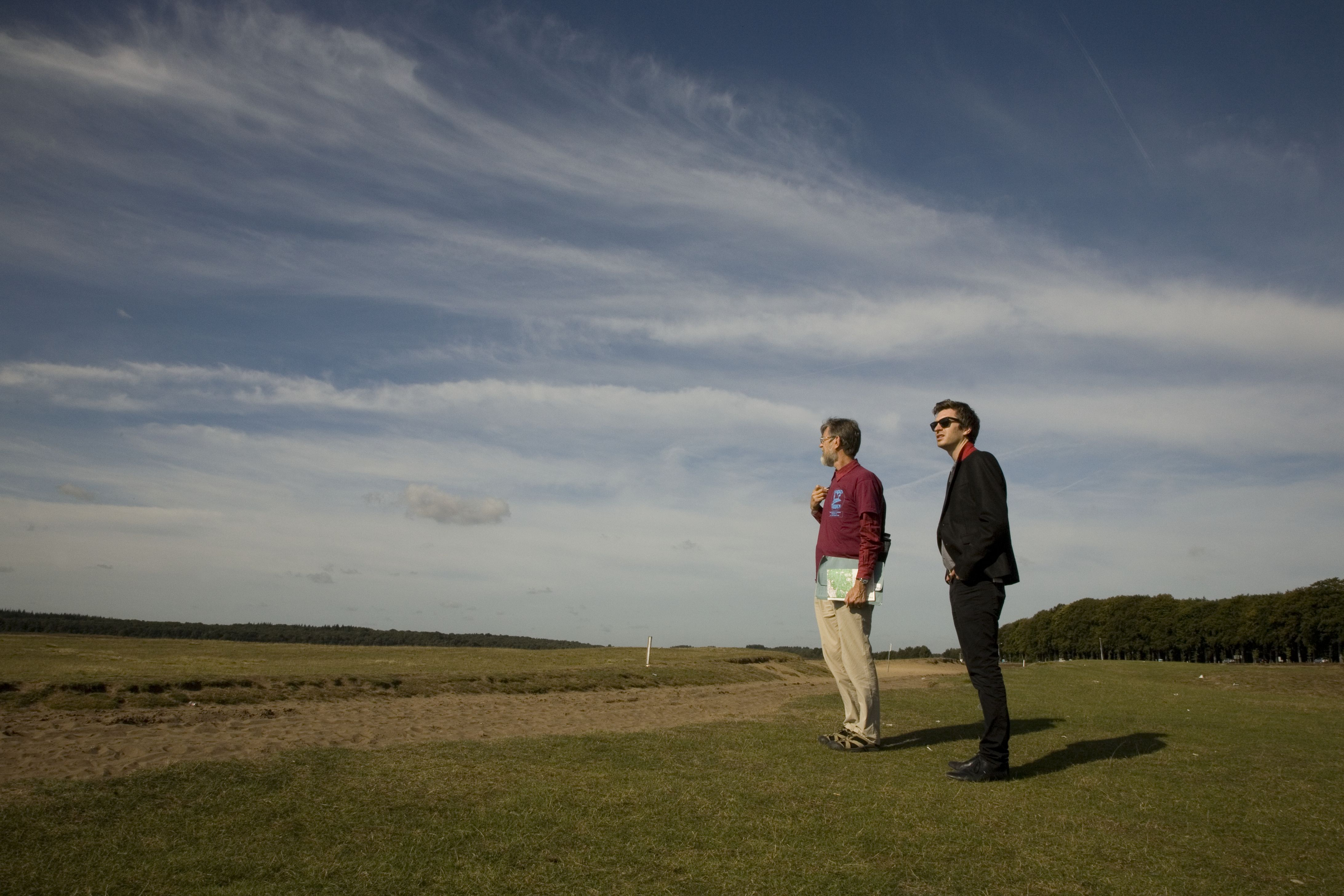

== Journeying Home: Thoughts on Dying Well ==
In his book Journeying Home: Thoughts on Dying Well Pott's son David, describes in detail the circumstances surrounding the deaths of Pott and his wife.

== See also ==
- John Waddy, Pott's fellow company commander.

== Bibliography ==
- Middlebrook, Martin (1994). Arnhem 1944: The Airborne Battle. Viking. ISBN 0-670-83546-3.
- Waddy, John (2001) [First published in 1999]. A Tour of the Arnhem Battlefields. Pen & Sword Books Limited. ISBN 0-85052-571-3.
- Armistice Day honour for hero Strathspey Herald
