= William S. Anderson =

British businessman (1919–2021)

William Summers Anderson
- Born: March 29, 1919; Hankow, China
- Died: June 29, 2021 (aged 102); Palo Alto, California, U.S.
- Occupations: business machine salesman, corporate President
- Known for: President of NCR
- Spouse: Janice Anderson
- Children: 3

William Summers Anderson (March 29, 1919 – June 29, 2021) was a British businessman who served as President and Chairman of the National Cash Register Corp (NCR) from 1972 to 1984.

== Early life and education ==
Anderson was born in March 1919 in Hankow in Central China and went to school in Wuhan and Shanghai. Anderson’s parents were part of a large expatriate community in Wuhan. As his father was Scottish, he was born a British citizen. Just as he was about to graduate from the PTH high school in Shanghai, the Sino-Japanese war broke out. In 1937, Anderson and his recently widowed mother fled to Hong Kong where they made their new home and he took a job as an internal auditor at The Peninsula Hotel Group while studying accountancy in the evenings. Two years later, after gaining his qualifications, he joined an auditing firm.

Anderson was fluent in Cantonese and Mandarin Chinese.

== Military service and prisoner of war ==
On December 8, 1941, the day after the Japanese attacked Pearl Harbor, Hong Kong was also attacked by the Japanese. As a member of the Hong Kong Volunteer Defence Corps, Anderson fought the Japanese but after 17 days of heavy fighting Hong Kong surrendered. On Christmas Day 1941, exactly four years after he had escaped from the Japanese in China, he became a prisoner of war (POW) and lost his second home. For the first two years, he was in a prison camp in Hong Kong before being moved to Nagoya, Japan as part of a group of 400, to work in a railway locomotive factory. Here the work was very hard; inmates worked 13 days out of 14 and were beaten on occasion. Towards the end of 1944, Japan was being bombed regularly. In May 1945, a large air raid over Nagoya knocked out the factory and the POWs were sent across the country to Toyama on the west coast to work at a branch of the locomotive factory. Toyama was almost totally destroyed in a fire bomb raid on August 1, 1945, after which the POWs were confined to barracks until the Japanese surrender on August 15, 1945. He was evacuated from Japan to the Philippines and as a British citizen, sent to England after two weeks of recovery in Canada.

== NCR beginnings ==
One of Anderson’s fellow POWs was George Haynes who was the manager of NCR China. After the war, Haynes persuaded Anderson to join NCR. After some brief sales training in England, he was appointed general manager of NCR Hong Kong. At that time, NCR Hong Kong was a war-shattered, rag tag branch of about seven people scratching out a living in used business machines. Using his accounting contacts, he succeeded in selling accounting machines to all the banks and utility companies as well as many commercial and industrial companies. Anderson had studied both Mandarin and Cantonese in his school days and this assisted him greatly during his time in Hong Kong. By 1960, NCR had acquired 97% of the Hong Kong business machine market. At that time, George Haynes was based in Japan, heading up the Far East operation.

== NCR Japan ==
When George Haynes was promoted to head office in Dayton Ohio, Anderson left Hong Kong to become Chairman of the Japanese company and vice president for the Far East region. Anderson introduced a “vocational” approach to the Japanese sales organisation whereby a particular customer would have a single point of contact with NCR regardless of the type of product being sold. Under his guidance NCR Japan became the most profitable of all of NCR's worldwide operations.

== Later life ==
Anderson stayed on the NCR board of directors until 1989 and was not involved in the acquisition of the company by AT&T in 1991 (NCR was subsequently renamed “AT&T GIS”). The merger was a failure and NCR once again became a stand-alone company in 1997. In his 1991 autobiography, Anderson was optimistic about the AT&T merger, but in a speech in 2006, he described the exercise as a disaster: not only did the market capitalization drop from $7.4 billion to $3.4 billion, there were also operating losses of $4 billion, a total cost to AT&T shareholders of $8 billion. Anderson attributed the failure of the merger to an arrogant attitude by AT&T which resulted in the loss of 90% of NCR’s senior officers and mid-managers which led to the loss of long-time customers.

After retirement from NCR, Anderson served on various stock exchange boards of directors as well as boards of non-profit organizations. He died in June 2021 at the age of 102.

== Sources ==
- 2006 biography of William S. Anderson
- 2006 speech to Dayton Rotary Club
