= Douglas Birks =

English cricketer

Personal information
- Full name: Douglas Thomas Montague Birks
- Born: 4 July 1919; Roche, Cornwall, England
- Died: 26 February 2004 (aged 84); Ledbury, Herefordshire, England
- Batting: Right-handed
- Bowling: Right-arm fast-medium

Domestic team information
- Years: Team
- 1938–1948: Suffolk

Career statistics
Competition	First-class
Matches	1
Runs scored	3
Batting average	3.00
100s/50s	–/–
Top score	3
Balls bowled	–
Wickets	–
Bowling average	–
5 wickets in innings	–
10 wickets in match	–
Best bowling	–
Catches/stumpings	–/–
- Source: Cricinfo, 11 April 2013

Douglas Thomas Montague Birks (4 July 1919 – 26 February 2004) was an English cricketer. Birks was a right-handed batsman who bowled right-arm fast-medium. He was born at Roche, Cornwall, and was educated at Radley College.

Birks played minor counties cricket for Suffolk, making his debut for the county against Hertfordshire in the 1938 Minor Counties Championship. He made two further appearances in 1938, before making five appearances in the 1939 Minor Counties Championship. Following World War II, he continued to play for Suffolk, making seventeen further appearances for the county, the last of which came against Berkshire in the 1948 Minor Counties Championship. The following season he made a single first-class appearance for the Free Foresters against Cambridge University at Fenner's. In a match which was drawn, Birks batted once, scoring 3 runs before he was dismissed by Peter Hall. This was his only first-class appearance.

He died at Ledbury, Herefordshire on 26 February 2004, following a battle with myeloma.
