= Kinmel Park mutiny =

1919 riot in Bodelwyddan, north Wales

- Date: 4 and 5 March 1919
- Location: Kinmel Park, just outside Abergele, Wales, United Kingdom
- Participants: Soldiers of the Canadian Expeditionary Force
- Outcome: 5 men killed; 23 being wounded; 78 men were arrested; 25 were convicted of mutiny

On 4 and 5 March 1919, Kinmel Park in Bodelwyddan, near Abergele, North Wales, experienced two days of riots in the Canadian sector of the local military complex, Kinmel Camp. The riots are believed to have been caused by delays in repatriation and by the Canadian soldiers' resentment at being used by their British officers as forced labour.

About 15,000 Canadian troops were stationed at Kinmel Camp for a period after the First World War and were kept in poor conditions while their officers received pay and were free to leave the camp. Noel Barbour writes in Gallant Protesters (1975):

The mutineers were our own men, stuck in the mud of North Wales, waiting impatiently to get back to Canada four months after the end of the war. The 15,000 Canadian troops that concentrated at Kinmel didn't know about the strikes that held up the fuelling ships and which had caused food shortages. The men were on half rations, there was no coal for the stove in the cold grey huts, and they hadn't been paid for over a month. Forty-two had slept in a hut meant for thirty, so they each took turns sleeping on the floor, with one blanket each.

In The Official History of the Canadian Army in the First World War G. W. L. Nicholson describes the Kinmel mutiny as one of a series of events that occurred during the post war redeployment of Canadian troops:

In all, between November 1918 and June 1919, there were thirteen instances or disturbances involving Canadian troops in England [sic]. The most serious of these occurred in Kinmel Park on 4th and 5th March 1919, when dissatisfaction over delays in sailing resulted in five men being killed and 23 being wounded. Seventy-eight men were arrested, of whom 25 were convicted of mutiny and given sentences varying from 90 days' detention to ten years' penal servitude.

== Bibliography ==
Notes

References

- Carradice, Phil (4 March 2012). "The Kinmel Camp riots of 1919". BBC.
- Coombs, Howard G. (October 2004). "Dimensions of Military Leadership: The Kinmel Park Mutiny of 4/5 March 1919" (PDF). Land Warfare Studies Canadian Forces College. Archived from the original (PDF) on 23 May 2006.
- Leroux, Marc (2020). "Kinmel Park". Canadian Great War Project.
