= 1919 in Wales =

- Centuries: 18th; 19th; 20th; 21st
- Decades: 1890s; 1900s; 1910s; 1920s; 1930s
- See also: List of years in Wales; Timeline of Welsh history 1919 in The United Kingdom Scotland Elsewhere

This article is about the particular significance of the year 1919 to Wales and its people.

== Incumbents ==
- Archdruid of the National Eisteddfod of Wales – Dyfed
- Lord Lieutenant of Anglesey – Sir Richard Henry Williams-Bulkeley, 12th Baronet
- Lord Lieutenant of Brecknockshire – Joseph Bailey, 2nd Baron Glanusk
- Lord Lieutenant of Caernarvonshire – John Ernest Greaves
- Lord Lieutenant of Cardiganshire – Herbert Davies-Evans
- Lord Lieutenant of Carmarthenshire – John Hinds
- Lord Lieutenant of Denbighshire – Lloyd Tyrell-Kenyon, 4th Baron Kenyon
- Lord Lieutenant of Flintshire – Henry Gladstone, later Baron Gladstone
- Lord Lieutenant of Glamorgan – Robert Windsor-Clive, 1st Earl of Plymouth
- Lord Lieutenant of Merionethshire – Sir Osmond Williams, 1st Baronet
- Lord Lieutenant of Monmouthshire – Ivor Herbert, 1st Baron Treowen
- Lord Lieutenant of Montgomeryshire – Sir Herbert Williams-Wynn, 7th Baronet
- Lord Lieutenant of Pembrokeshire – John Philipps, 1st Viscount St Davids
- Lord Lieutenant of Radnorshire – Arthur Walsh, 3rd Baron Ormathwaite
- Bishop of Bangor – Watkin Williams
- Bishop of Llandaff – Joshua Pritchard Hughes
- Bishop of St Asaph – A. G. Edwards (later Archbishop of Wales)
- Bishop of St Davids – John Owen

== Events ==
- 1 January – Surgeon John Lynn-Thomas receives a knighthood in the New Year Honours.
- 13 January – The Red flag is hoisted during a mutiny on HMS Kilbride at Milford Haven.
- 4–5 March – Kinmel Park Riots by Canadian troops at Kinmel Camp, Bodelwyddan. Five men are killed and 28 injured.
- 31 March – Submarine HMS H52 is launched at Pembroke Dock; commissioned on 16 December, she is the last Welsh-built fighting ship to enter the Royal Navy.
- 10 May – Philanthropist Sir William James Thomas is created Baronet Thomas of Ynyshir.
- 14 May – The University College of Wales, Aberystwyth, establishes probably the world's first Chair in International Politics, endowed by David Davies and his sisters in honour of Woodrow Wilson, with Alfred Eckhard Zimmern as first professor.
- 6 June – A race riot breaks out in Newport, Monmouthshire.
- 11 June – Three people are killed in a 4-day race riot in Cardiff.
- 27 June – William James Thomas (Trethomas), coalowner and philanthropist, and James Cory, Cardiff shipowner and philanthropist, are both created baronets.
- 10 July – Coalition Liberal candidate David Matthews wins the Swansea East by-election following the death of Thomas Jeremiah Williams MP.
- 4 August – Death of Thomas Francis Roberts, Principal of the University College of Wales, Aberystwyth, since 1891; he is succeeded by John Humphreys Davies.
- 19 August — The Welsh Church (Temporalities) Act 1919 is passed.
- 25 August – Fire destroys the Waterloo Hydro, Aberystwyth's largest hotel.
- 20 December – Six seamen drown while returning to their ship by boat at Milford Haven.
- unknown dates
  - U.S. chemical company Monsanto enters a partnership with the Graesser chemical works at Cefn Mawr.
  - John Sankey chairs the commission that recommends nationalisation of the coal industry.

== Arts and literature ==
=== Awards ===
- National Eisteddfod of Wales (held in Corwen)
- National Eisteddfod of Wales: Chair – D. Cledlyn Davies, "Y Proffwyd"
- National Eisteddfod of Wales: Crown – William Williams (Crwys)

=== New books ===
- Sir Joseph Alfred Bradney – Noctes Flandricae
- William Evans (Wil Ifan) – Dail Iorwg
- David Rees Griffiths – Ambell Gainc
- John Cowper Powys – After My Fashion (unpublished until 1980)
- W. Llewelyn Williams – The Making of Modern Wales

=== Music ===
- The Final and Interim Reports of the Adult Education Committee of the Ministry of Reconstruction, 1918-1919 notes that "The population of both industrial and rural Wales offers the finest possible material for musical culture, though up to the present such culture has been confined within somewhat narrow limits."

=== Film ===
- Ivor Novello appears in his first film: The Call of the Blood.

== Sport ==
- Boxing – Jimmy Wilde goes on a tour of the US, taking on all contenders.
- Quoits – Wales defeat England 219 – 203 at the Custom House in London.
- Rugby union – Wales lose to a touring New Zealand Army team.

== Births ==
- 17 February (in Washington, Co. Durham) – Jonah Jones, sculptor, writer and educationist (died 2004)
- 18 March – Menna Gallie née Humphreys, novelist and translator (died 1990)
- 15 April – Emyr Humphreys, writer (died 2020)
- 22 May – Glyn Davies, economist (died 2003)
- 16 June – Morys Bruce, 4th Baron Aberdare (died 2005)
- 16 July – Harold Rubens, pianist and human rights activist (died 2010, in London)
- 14 September – Kelvin Thomas, conductor, composer, singer and writer (died 2019)
- 17 October – Wyn Griffiths, footballer (died 2006)
- 19 October - Owen Filer, Welsh centenarian
- 22 October – Abdulrahim Abby Farah, Somali diplomat and politician (died 2018 in the United States)
- 9 December – Meredydd Evans, collector, editor, historian and performer of Welsh folk music (died 2015)
- 12 December – Cliff Davies, Wales international rugby player (died 1967)
- 27 December – Brinley Rees, academic (died 2004)

== Deaths ==
- 2 January – Arthur Gould, Wales international rugby captain, 54
- 3 January – James Hills-Johnes, Victoria Cross recipient, 85
- 24 February – Edward Bishop, Wales international rugby player, 54
- 27 February – Robert Harris, Welsh-born painter, 69
- 12 June – Thomas Jeremiah Williams, Coalition Liberal Member of Parliament (MP) for Swansea East, 47
- 13 July – Theo Harding, Wales international rugby player, 59
- 26 July
  - Griffith Hugh Jones (Gutyn Arfon), composer
  - Richard Hughes Williams (Dic Tryfan), writer, 41
- 4 August – Thomas Francis Roberts, academic, 58
- 27 September – Adelina Patti, singer, 76
- 15 October – Arthur Owen Vaughan (Owen Rhoscomyl), novelist, 56
- 3 December – Volney Rogers, Welsh-American lawyer, 73

== See also ==
- 1919 in Ireland
