= Swansea East by-election =

Swansea East by-election may refer to one of three parliamentary by-elections held for the British House of Commons constituency of Swansea East, in South Wales:

- 1919 Swansea East by-election
- 1940 Swansea East by-election
- 1963 Swansea East by-election

== See also ==
- Swansea East constituency
- List of United Kingdom by-elections
