= John Vivian, 4th Baron Swansea =

British aristocrat (1925–2005)

The Right Honourable The Lord Swansea CStJ DL
- At the 1966 Commonwealth Games in Kingston, Jamaica

Member of the House of Lords
- Lord Temporal
- as a hereditary peer 16 November 1934 – 11 November 1999
- Preceded by: The 3rd Baron Swansea
- Succeeded by: Seat abolished (Note: Pursuant to the House of Lords Act 1999.)

Personal details
- Born: John Hussey Hamilton Vivian; 1 January 1925
- Died: 27 June 2005 (aged 80)
- Party: Conservative; Crossbench
- Spouses: Miriam Caccia-Birch (m. 1956; div. 1973) Lucy Temple Richards (m. 1982)
- Education: Eton College; Trinity College, Cambridge
- Sports career
- Sport: Sport shooting
Medal record
Representing Wales
Commonwealth Games
Gold medal – first place	1966 Kingston	Full bore rifle
Silver medal – second place	1982 Brisbane	Full bore rifle

John Hussey Hamilton Vivian, 4th Baron Swansea (1 January 1925 – 27 June 2005) was a British peer, sports shooter and lobbyist.

Upon the death of his father, Odo Vivian, in 1934, Swansea succeeded to the title of Baron Swansea at the age of nine. He was educated at Eton College, where he first competed in rifle shooting, representing the school at Bisley in the Ashburton Shield, and at Trinity College, Cambridge, where he studied French and German. He took his seat in the House of Lords in 1956, and spoke unsuccessfully against proposals to expand gun control legislation in the 1980s and 1990s. He resigned the Conservative whip in protest at restrictions on firearms ownership passed in response to the Hungerford and Dunblane mass shootings. In 1999, he lost his seat as a result of the House of Lords Act 1999, which removed most hereditary peers from the Lords.

Swansea was regarded as one of the finest rifle shots of his day. He won the Scottish National Championships in 1955, and represented frequently both Wales and Great Britain. He won Wales's first shooting medal at a Commonwealth Games at the 1966 Kingston Games, taking gold in fullbore rifle shooting, and a silver medal at the Brisbane Games in 1982. He won several major competitions at the Imperial Meeting, the premier event in British and Commonwealth fullbore shooting, including two wins each in the target rifle Grand Aggregate and the match rifle Hopton Aggregate. He was one of five shooters to captain a team in each of the "Big Five" international matches: the National, Mackinnon, Kolapore, Australia and Palma.

Swansea was active in the administration of British shooting, serving as vice-chairman of the National Rifle Association between 1989 and 1992 and as a founder and chairman of the British Shooting Sports Council. He sold the family seat of Caer Beris in 1966, and thereafter lived mostly in London. He was married twice, and was succeeded upon his death in 2005 by Richard Anthony Hussey Vivian, his son from his first marriage.

== Early life and political work ==
John Hussey Hamilton Vivian was born on 1 January 1925. He succeeded to the title of Baron Swansea in 1934, at the age of nine, following the death of his father, Odo Vivian, 3rd Baron Swansea. His mother, Winifred Hamilton, died in 1944. Swansea was educated at Eton College, where he shot for the school at Bisley in the Ashburton Shield and worked during the Second World War making pivots for anti-tank guns. He subsequently went up to Trinity College, Cambridge, and graduated with a degree in French and German.

Swansea took his seat in the House of Lords in 1956. In his maiden speech, he spoke against the mandatory teaching of the Welsh language in Welsh schools, suggesting that it would discourage the movement of valuable workers from England. He also spoke in the Lords on the content of BBC programming and the importance of road safety. He became Deputy Lieutenant for Powys in 1962. In 1971, he was awarded the Order of Paduka Seri Laila Jasa Second Class by Brunei, and in 1994 he was made a Commander of the Order of St John. In 1998, he supported the city of Swansea's unsuccessful bid to be the home of the Welsh Assembly.

Swansea was vice-chairman of the British National Rifle Association's governing council between 1989 and 1992. He was also a founder, vice-chairman and chairman of the British Shooting Sports Council, a representative organisation for the governing bodies of British shooting sports. He lobbied against legislation drawn in the aftermath of the Hungerford and Dunblane mass shootings (in 1987 and 1996 respectively), including a ban on the private possession of pistols, passed as the Firearms (Amendment) Act 1997. Commenting on Swansea's remarks during the second reading of what became the Act, the New Law Journal called him the "most ardent spokesman" for the shooting lobby, while also characterising his speech as "containing rather more hyperbole than is usual in the Lords". Swansea spoke in support of banning Kalashnikov rifles and of a requirement for shotguns not in use to be locked up securely. He resigned the Conservative parliamentary whip in protest at increasing restrictions on firearms, and sat as a crossbencher. He lost his place in the House as a result of the House of Lords Act 1999, which removed most hereditary peers from the Lords.

== Target shooting ==
An obituary in the Daily Telegraph called Swansea "one of the finest marksmen of his generation". He captained a Welsh team to the Caribbean in 1952, which was defeated in its match against the West Indies. In 1955, he won the Scottish National Championships in fullbore rifle shooting, becoming the first peer to do so. In 1966, he represented Wales in the Commonwealth Games, where he took gold in the fullbore rifle Queen's Prize event, contested with .303-calibre rifles. He scored 394 out of a possible 405, ahead of Robert Stewart of Papua and New Guinea on 381. This was Wales's first Commonwealth medal in shooting. During the medal ceremony, Swansea initially left the podium after the band played Land of Hope and Glory, the English anthem for the Games, instead of the Welsh Hen Wlad Fy Nhadau. He took a silver in the same event at the 1982 Games in Brisbane and competed at the 1986 Games in Edinburgh, as well as two additional games, at Christchurch in 1974 and Edmonton in 1978.

At Bisley, Swansea won the Grand Aggregate of the Imperial Meeting (the premier competition in British and Commonwealth fullbore shooting) in 1957 and 1960; he also won the 1957 St George's Prize. He won the Hopton Aggregate, the corresponding competition in the longer-range discipline of match rifle, in 1971 and 1974. He was placed in the top hundred competitors of the Queen's Prize, the most prestigious contest at the Imperial Meeting, (Note: The Times, 11 July 2005. On the Queen's Prize, see Cornfield 1987, p. 157.) eighteen times, and won the competition's silver medal twice, in 1958 and 1968. (Note: The silver medal is awarded to the winner of the second of the competition's three stages.) He was a member of eight touring Great Britain teams and was one of five shooters to captain each of the "Big Five" international matches – the National, Mackinnon, Kolapore, Australia and Palma. For Wales, he shot 37 times in the annual short-range National Match and 34 in the long-range Mackinnon. Later in life, following an elbow injury, he switched from rifle shooting to pistol.

Swansea was president of the Cambridge University Long Range Rifle Club, and a long-time captain of the House of Lords shooting team, which was forced to shut down following the gun control legislation of the 1980s and 1990s. His grandfather, Henry Vivian, had competed for the House of Commons in the inaugural Vizianagram match between the two houses in 1862. Swansea also administered the Corporation Swindle, a tongue-in-cheek contest "won" by the competitor making the lowest score in the Corporation, a notoriously challenging long-range shoot of the Imperial Meeting at 1,000 yards (910 m), without missing the target.

== Personal life and family ==
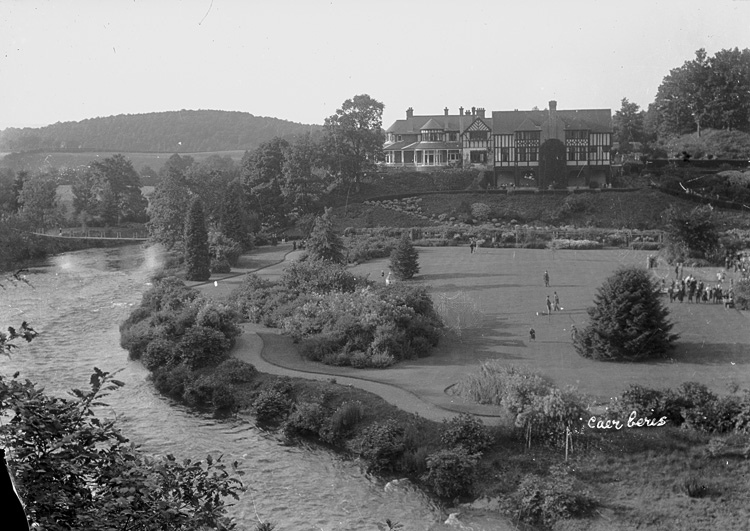
Caer Beris, Swansea's family home near Builth Wells, photographed in the 1920s

An obituary in The Times described Swansea as "a mild and private man", with a slight stammer. He was a freemason, serving as provincial grand master for the organisation's South Wales eastern division: he was awarded the Grand Master's Order of Service to Masonry. He also worked for the publisher Alvin Redman.

Swansea was married twice: firstly, in 1956, to Miriam Caccia-Birch, from New Zealand. They had two daughters and, in 1957, a son, Richard Anthony Hussey Vivian, who later succeeded to the title of Baron Swansea. In 1966, Swansea sold Caer Beris, the family's ancestral seat near Builth Wells in Powys; by the late 1960s, he was living primarily in London. Following a divorce in 1973, he married Lucy Temple Richards (née Gough), daughter of the Anglican archbishop Hugh Gough, in 1982. A 1996 profile in the South Wales Evening Post described him as living in "a small Chelsea flat dwarfed by outsized family heirlooms", and as having the same orthopaedic surgeon as the Queen Mother. Swansea died on 27 June 2005.

== Works cited ==
- Agbogun, Jacob Bodrunin (1970). A History of the British Commonwealth Games, 1930–1966 (MA). University of Alberta – via Internet Archive.
- Cole, Rob (18 July 2005). "Lord Swansea". The Independent. Archived from the original on 14 June 2022.
- Cornfield, Susie (1987). The Queen's Prize: The Story of the National Rifle Association. London: Pelham. ISBN 0-7207-1751-5.
- Gerken, Tom (22 July 2014). "Glasgow 2014: Wales countdown to the Commonwealth Games". BBC Sport.
- Hayes, Colin (Spring 2013). "Keith Haskell" (PDF). The National Rifle Association Journal. Vol. 92, no. 1. pp. 51–52.
- Horton, A.V.M. (2005). "Negara Brunei Darussalam: Obituaries 2005". Borneo Research Bulletin.
- Hudson, Richard (1988). "Shooting to Kill the Bill". The New Law Journal. 138 (1): 478.
- "Lady Swansea Will Lay Down Port for Son with Winnings". Time and Tide. Vol. 50. 1969. p. 21 – via Google Books.
- "Lord Swansea". The Telegraph. 5 July 2005.
- "Lord Swansea". The Times. 11 July 2005.
- "Lord Swansea Rifleman of the Day". The Daily Telegraph. 20 July 1957. p. 8 – via Newspapers.com.
- "Results: Day Four". The Sydney Morning Herald. 30 July 1986. p. 41 – via Newspapers.com.
- "Scots Rifle Title for Lord Swansea; Rhodesian Second". The Scotsman. 13 June 1955.
- Stuart, Julia (14 March 1996). "Last Days of a Dynasty". South Wales Evening Post. pp. 20–21 – via Newspapers.com.
- "Swansea, 4th Baron". Who Was Who. Vol. 11, 2005–2006. A. & C. Black. 2006. p. 511. ISBN 978-0-7136-7601-3 – via Internet Archive.
- "Swansea Backs Swansea". South Wales Daily Post. 21 January 1988. p. 4 – via British Newspaper Archive.
- Welsh Target Shooting Federation (2018). "Commonwealth Shooting Reports/Results 1966–2018" (PDF). Archived from the original (PDF) on 21 January 2024.
- The West India Committee Circular, vol. 67, West India Committee, December 1952 – via Google Books
- "Victory Was Out of Tune". Reading Evening Post. 9 August 1966. p. 18 – via Newspapers.com.

Peerage of the United Kingdom
Preceded by Odo Vivian	Baron Swansea; 1934–2005; Member of the House of Lords (1934–1999)	Succeeded by Richard Vivian
Baronetage of the United Kingdom
Preceded by Odo Vivian	Baronet of Singleton; 1934–2005	Succeeded by Richard Vivian
