= William Williams (Swansea MP) =

Welsh businessman and politician, born 1840

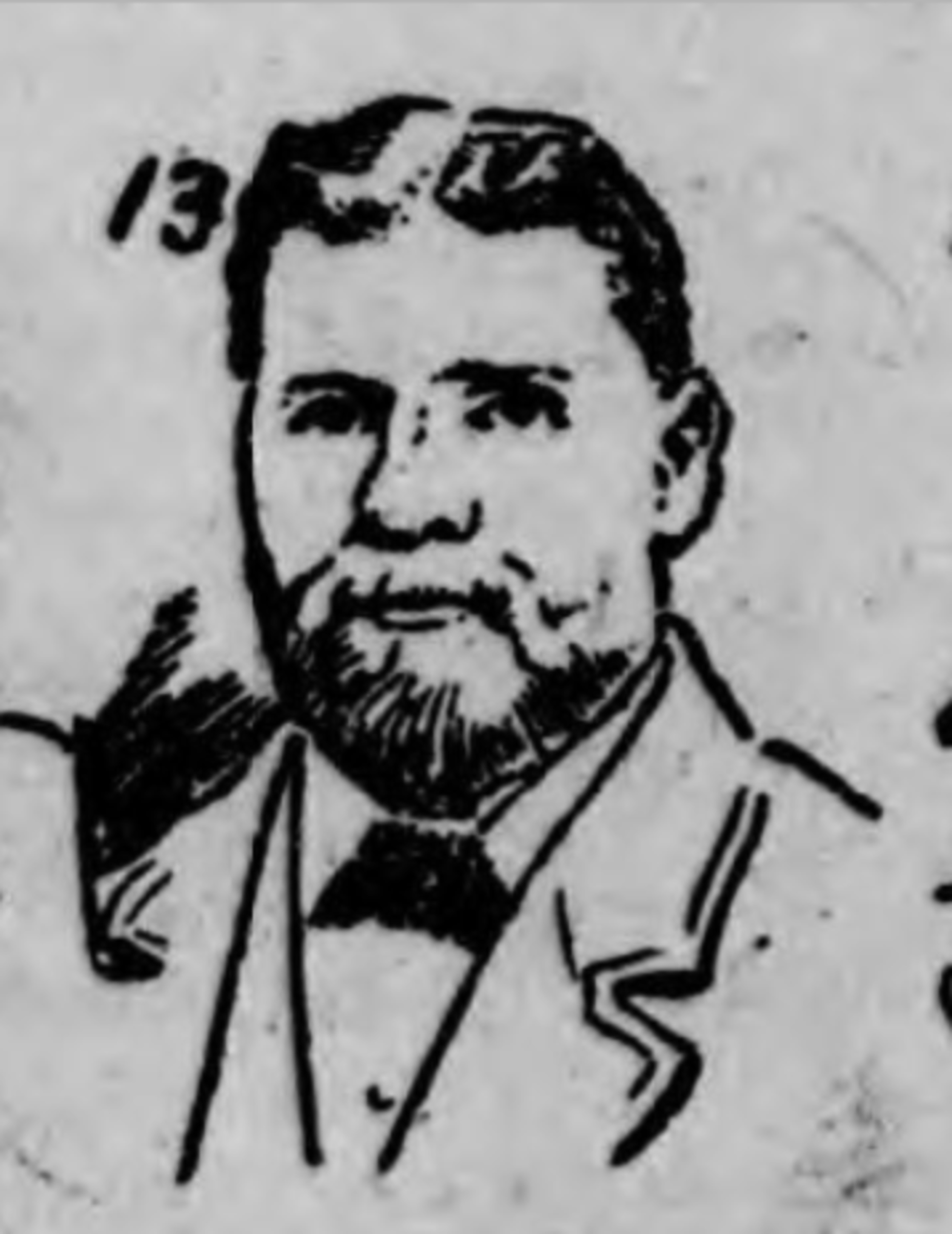
William-Williams-AS.

William Williams (1840 – 21 April 1904) was a Welsh businessman and Liberal party politician.

Williams started work as a boy on the cold rolling lines of the Upper Forest Tinplate Works, Morriston, Swansea. His leg was crushed in the mills, requiring amputation. He returned to work after the accident as a clerk in the mill's office. There he showed a talent for business, and soon had built up sufficient capital to start business on his own account.

In 1868 he formed his own company, the Worcester Tinplate Works, which eventually absorbed his former employer to become the Upper Forest & Worcester Steel and Tinplate Works Ltd. At the time of his death he was described as "one of the leading tinplate makers in the world". He was also a director of the Capital and Counties Bank Limited, the Swansea Gas Company, the Swansea and Mumbles Railway and the Dillwyn Colliery Company.

Williams was a prominent member of the Liberal Party in Swansea, and was president of the local Liberal Association. He was elected to Swansea Town Council, and was mayor of Swansea in 1883– 1884. He retired from the town council in 1886, but returned to local politics when he was elected to the first Glamorgan County Council at an 1889 by-election, representing Morriston. He was also a member of the local board of guardians, rural sanitary authority and a justice of the peace for Swansea and Glamorgan. He also served as a Deacon of Libanus Church, Morriston for many years.

When the sitting Member of Parliament (MP) for Swansea District, Sir Hussey Vivian, was elevated to the peerage in June 1893, Williams was elected unopposed in his place. He did not defend the seat at the next general election in 1895.

His son, Thomas Jeremiah Williams, was elected as MP for the same constituency at a by-election in 1915.

He died at his home, Maes y Gwernen Hall, Llangyfelach, in 1904, aged 64. He is buried in Oystermouth Cemetery in Mumbles, Swansea.

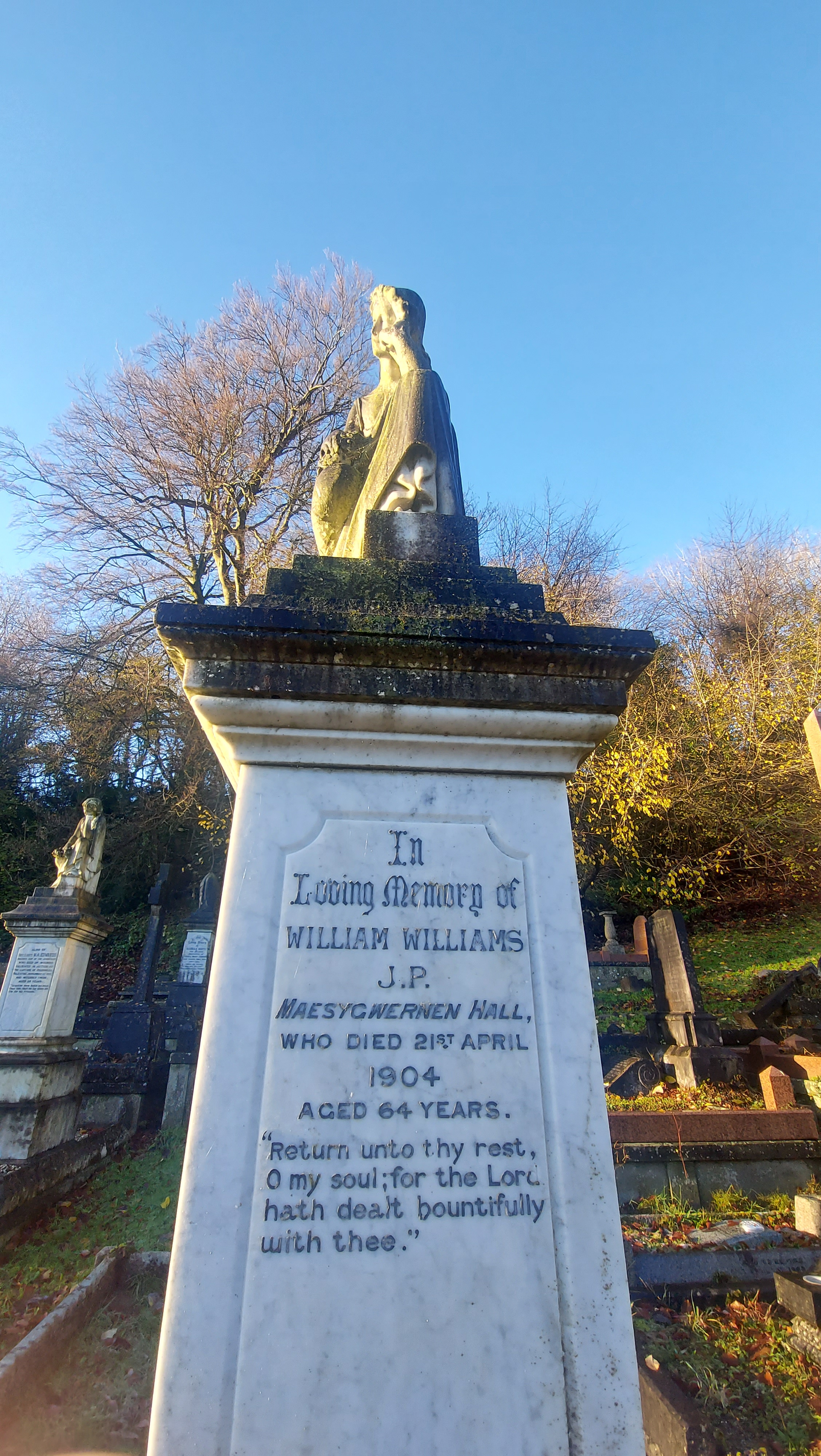
Grave of William Williams J.P.

Parliament of the United Kingdom
Preceded by Sir Henry Hussey Vivian	Member of Parliament for Swansea District; 1893 – 1895	Succeeded by David Brynmor Jones
