= David Williams (Swansea East MP) =

Welsh Labour Party politician (1865–1941)

David Williams MP, JP

Member of Parliament for Swansea East
- In office 15 November 1922 – 26 January 1940
- Preceded by: David Matthews
- Succeeded by: David Mort

Personal details
- Born: David Williams; 8 September 1865 Swansea
- Died: 22 January 1941 (aged 75) Swansea
- Party: Labour
- Spouse: Elizabeth Colwill

David Williams (8 September 1865 – 22 January 1941) was a Welsh Labour Party politician. The second son of David and Mary Williams, his father worked at the local Kilvey Copper Works. Williams received little education before entering service in 1877 as a pageboy for the Genfell family of Kilvey, Swansea, owners of the copper works. By the age of 16, he was working in the copper works, but was dismissed after leading a strike. He then became an apprentice boilermaker, while attending evening classes. In 1889, he married Elizabeth Colwill, and the couple had five children.

Williams was involved in trade union activities and Labour politics from a young age. In 1898, he became the first Independent Labour Party councillor elected to Swansea Town Council, becoming an alderman in 1904 and was mayor of Swansea in 1912–1913. He received the freedom of Swansea in 1924. He was the first chairman of the Swansea Co-operative Society when it was formed in 1900.

He unsuccessfully contested the parliamentary constituency of Swansea East at the 1918 general election. When the Coalition Liberal MP Thomas Jeremiah Williams died the following year, he stood in the resulting by-election, cutting the Liberal majority. He won the seat at the 1922 general election, and held it until he resigned from the House of Commons on 26 January 1940, due to ill health. He died a year later, aged 75.

Parliament of the United Kingdom
Preceded by David Matthews	Member of Parliament for Swansea East; 1922–1940	Succeeded by David Mort
