= 1910 Swansea District by-election =

UK parliamentary by-election

The 1910 Swansea District by-election was a parliamentary by-election held for the UK House of Commons constituency of Swansea District in Glamorgan in South Wales on 28 February 1910.

== Vacancy ==
The by-election was caused by the appointment of the sitting Liberal MP, Sir David Brynmor Jones, KC to be Recorder of Merthyr Tydfil. Under the Parliamentary rules of the day, if he wished to remain an MP, he was required to resign and fight a by-election.

== Candidates ==
The Swansea District Liberals re-selected Jones. At the general election of January 1910, he had been returned with the substantial majority of 6,073 votes over his Unionist opponent.

== The result ==
There being no other candidates putting themselves forward, Brynmor Jones was returned unopposed.

1910 Swansea District by-election
Party	Candidate	Votes	%	±%
Liberal	Brynmor Jones	Unopposed		
Registered electors				
Liberal hold				

== See also ==
- Lists of United Kingdom by-elections
- United Kingdom by-election records
