= 1893 Swansea District by-election =

UK parliamentary by-election in Wales

The 1893 Swansea District by-election was a parliamentary by-election held on 19 June 1893 for the UK House of Commons constituency of Swansea District in Glamorgan in South Wales.

== Vacancy ==
The by-election was triggered by the elevation to the peerage of the sitting Liberal MP, Henry Vivian.

== Candidates ==
The only candidate nominated was local businessman William Williams, the founder and manager of the Worcester Tinplate Works. He was thus elected unopposed.

== Result ==
1893 Swansea District by-election
Party	Candidate	Votes	%	±%
Liberal	William Williams	Unopposed		
Registered electors				
Liberal hold				
