= 1914 Swansea District by-election =

UK Parliamentary by-election

The 1914 Swansea District by-election was held on 13 August 1914. The by-election was held due to the incumbent Liberal MP, Sir David Brynmor Jones, becoming Recorder of Cardiff. It was retained by Jones who was unopposed due to a War-time electoral pact.

1914 Swansea District by-election
Party	Candidate	Votes	%	±%
Liberal	Brynmor Jones	Unopposed		
Registered electors				
Liberal hold				
