= Odo Vivian, 3rd Baron Swansea =

Welsh soldier

Lieutenant Colonel The Lord Swansea
- Born: 22 April 1875; Eaton Square, London
- Died: 26 November 1934 (aged 59); Caer Beris, Builth Wells, Breconshire
- Military career
- Allegiance: United Kingdom
- Branch: British Army
- Rank: Lieutenant Colonel
- Awards: Royal Victorian Order; Distinguished Service Order; Territorial Decoration

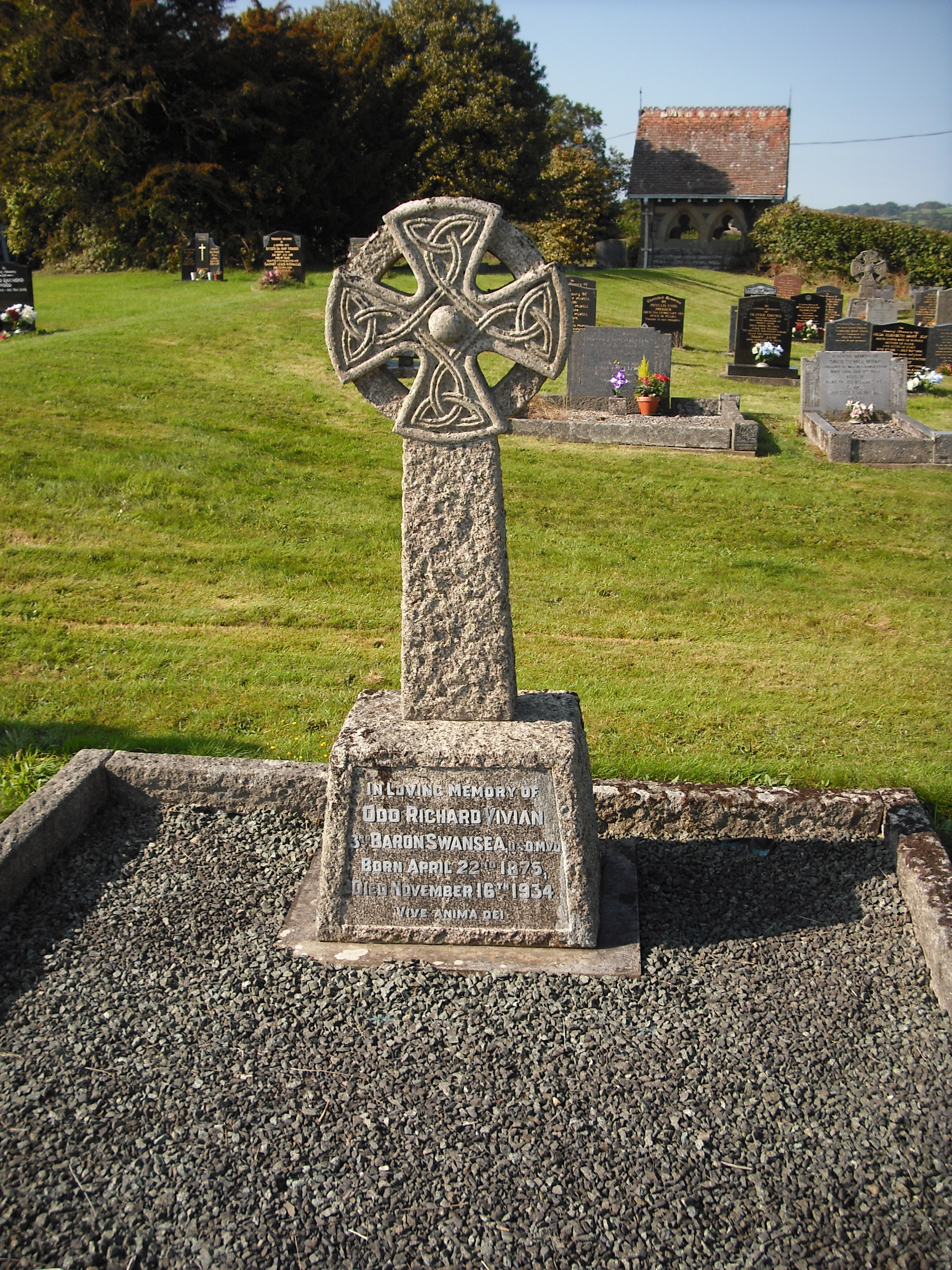
Grave of Odo Vivian at St. David's Church, Maesmynis, Builth Wells

Odo Richard Vivian, 3rd Baron Swansea, MVO, DSO, TD (22 April 1875 – 16 November 1934), was a Welsh soldier from the Vivian family.

== Biography ==
Vivian, the son of Colonel Henry Vivian, 1st Baron Swansea, and Averil Beaumont, was born in Eaton Square, London. He studied at the University of Cambridge and was awarded the Royal Victorian Order (Fourth Class) by King Edward, at Swansea, in July 1902.

He served in World War I with the Royal Irish Rifles and the Cameron Highlanders. He was Lieutenant Colonel of the 6th Battalion, Welch Regiment, Glamorgan Yeomanry, and was made a Companion of the Distinguished Service Order for gallantry during the war. He was awarded a Territorial Decoration in 1916. A diary by Vivian, kept during his service in the war, and including his account of the 1917 Battle of Ypres, is held by the National Library of Wales.

He later served as a justice of the peace and was Deputy Lieutenant of Glamorgan. In 1922 he gained the title of 3rd Baron Swansea on the death of his half brother, Ernest Vivian, 2nd Baron Swansea.

His uncle Sir Arthur Vivian was a Liberal politician.

He died at his country seat, Caer Beris at Builth Wells in Breconshire, on 16 November 1934.

== Marriage and children ==
He married Winifred Hamilton on 25 October 1906 and they had four children; Ursula Margaret (1910–1963), John Hamilton Hussey (who succeeded to the title as 4th Baron Swansea; 1925–2005), Rosemary Winifred (1927–1981), and Averil (born 1930).

Peerage of the United Kingdom
| Preceded by Ernest Vivian | Baron Swansea; 1922–1934 | Succeeded by John Vivian |
