= David Mort =

David Llewellyn Mort (25 March 1888 – 1 January 1963) was a British Labour Party politician.

Born in Briton Ferry, Glamorgan, he left school aged thirteen when his father died. After initially working in an outfitters shop, he subsequently entered the local steel works. From the age of sixteen he was a preacher in the Congregational Church.

Mort joined the Independent Labour Party in 1906, and in 1915 became South Wales secretary of the Steel Trades Confederation. He was also involved in local politics as a member of Briton Ferry Urban District Council and Neath Borough Council.

At the 1929 general election, he was elected as Member of Parliament (MP) for Eccles. The Second Labour Government formed after the election subsequently collapsed and a National Government was formed. The government went to the country in a general election in October 1931. Mort, along with the majority of Labour MPs, lost his seat.

Mort stood, unsuccessfully, at the 1935 general election in Bilston. He was returned to the House of Commons as MP for Swansea East at an unopposed by-election in 1940, following the death of the Labour MP David Williams. He held the seat until his own death in 1963 aged 74, triggering another by-election.

Parliament of the United Kingdom
Preceded by Albert Bethel	Member of Parliament for Eccles; 1929 – 1931	Succeeded by John Potter
Preceded by David Williams	Member of Parliament for Swansea East; 1940 – 1963	Succeeded by Neil McBride
Party political offices
Preceded by Harry Davies	Wales Division representative on the National Administrative Council of the Independent Labour Party; 1928–1930	Succeeded by David Thomas
