= Swansea East (UK Parliament constituency) =

UK Parliament constituency (1918–2024)

Coordinates: 51°39′01″N 3°55′10″W

- Former borough constituency for the House of Commons
- Boundary of Swansea East in Wales
- Preserved county: West Glamorgan
- Electorate: 60,809 (December 2010)

1918–2024
- Seats: One
- Created from: Swansea
- Replaced by: Neath and Swansea East, Swansea West
- Senedd: Swansea East, South Wales West

Swansea East (Welsh: Dwyrain Abertawe) was a borough constituency (Note: A borough constituency (for the purposes of election expenses and type of returning officer)) in Wales in the House of Commons of the Parliament of the United Kingdom. It was represented by members of the Labour Party from 1922 until 2024. (Note: As with all constituencies, the constituency elects one Member of Parliament (MP) by the first past the post system of election at least every five years.)

As part of the 2023 Periodic Review of Westminster constituencies and under the June 2023 final recommendations of the Boundary Commission for Wales, the seat was abolished. Its wards were split between Neath and Swansea East, and Swansea West, to be first contested at the 2024 general election.

== Boundaries ==
Map of boundaries 1983−2024

1918–1949: The County Borough of Swansea wards of East, Landore, Morriston, and St John's.

1950–1955: The County Borough of Swansea wards of Alexandra, Castle, Clase, Kilvey, Landore, Llansamlet, Morriston, Penderry, St John's, and St Thomas.

1955–1983: The County Borough of Swansea wards of Castle, Landore, Llansamlet, Morriston, Penderry, St John's, and St Thomas.

1983-2024: The City of Swansea wards of Bonymaen, Cwmbwrla, Landore, Llansamlet, Morriston, Mynydd-Bach, Penderry and St. Thomas.

== Constituency profile ==
Although the constituency voted strongly to leave the European Union in 2016, an analysis of YouGov polling by Focaldata suggested support for Remain had risen from 37.9% to 50.7% in August 2018. However, in the 2019 European elections the city of Swansea as a whole voted strongly for the Brexit Party.

== Members of Parliament ==
Election	Member	Party	Notes
1918	Jeremiah Williams	Coalition Liberal	Member for Swansea District (1915–1918)
1919 by-election	David Matthews	Coalition Liberal	
Jan 1922	David Matthews	National Liberal	
1922	David Williams	Labour	
1940 by-election	David Mort	Labour	Died 1 January 1963
1963 by-election	Neil McBride	Labour	Died 9 September 1974, no by-election held
Oct 1974	Donald Anderson	Labour	
2005	Siân James	Labour	
2015	Carolyn Harris	Labour	Deputy Leader of the Welsh Labour Party
2024	Constituency abolished		

== Elections ==
=== Elections in the 1910s ===
General election 1918: Swansea East
Party		Candidate	Votes	%
C	National Liberal	Jeremiah Williams	11,071	63.6
	Labour	David Williams	6,341	36.4
Majority			4,730	27.2
Turnout			17,411	64.1
Registered electors			27,185	
	National Liberal win (new seat)			
C indicates candidate endorsed by the coalition government.

1919 Swansea East by-election
Party		Candidate	Votes	%	±%
C	National Liberal	David Matthews	9,250	53.1	−10.5
	Labour	David Williams	8,158	46.9	+10.5
Majority			1,092	6.2	−21.0
Turnout			17,408	64.0	−0.1
Registered electors			27,185		
	National Liberal hold		Swing	–10.5	
C indicates candidate endorsed by the coalition government.

=== Elections in the 1920s ===
General election 1922: Swansea East
Party	Candidate	Votes	%	±%
Labour	David Williams	11,333	50.9	+4.0
National Liberal	Edward Harris	10,926	49.1	−4.0
Majority		407	1.8	N/A
Turnout		22,259	81.7	+17.7
Registered electors		27,246		
Labour gain from National Liberal		Swing	+4.0	

General election 1923: Swansea East
Party	Candidate	Votes	%	±%
Labour	David Williams	12,735	57.4	+6.5
Liberal	Thomas Artemus Jones	9,463	42.6	−6.5
Majority		3,272	14.8	+13.0
Turnout		22,198	81.1	−0.6
Registered electors		27,365		
Labour hold		Swing	+6.5	

General election 1924: Swansea East
Party	Candidate	Votes	%	±%
Labour	David Williams	12,274	54.6	−2.8
Liberal	W Daniel Rees	10,186	45.4	+2.8
Majority		1,088	9.2	−5.6
Turnout		22,460	80.7	−0.4
Registered electors		27,836		
Labour hold		Swing	-2.8	

General election 1929: Swansea East
Party	Candidate	Votes	%	±%
Labour	David Williams	16,665	56.5	+1.9
Liberal	Arthur Hopkins	9,825	33.3	−12.1
Unionist	P P Jones	3,003	10.2	N/A
Majority		6,840	23.2	+14.0
Turnout		29,493	81.9	+1.2
Registered electors		36,001		
Labour hold		Swing	+7.0	

=== Elections in the 1930s ===
General election 1931: Swansea East
Party	Candidate	Votes	%	±%
Labour	David Williams	17,126	56.5	±0.0
Liberal	Richard David Chalke	13,177	43.5	+10.2
Majority		3,949	13.0	−10.2
Turnout		30,303	84.4	+2.5
Registered electors		35,918		
Labour hold		Swing	-5.1	

General election 1935: Swansea East
Party	Candidate	Votes	%	±%
Labour	David Williams	Unopposed		
Registered electors		35,940		
Labour hold				

=== Elections in the 1940s ===
1940 Swansea East by-election
Party	Candidate	Votes	%	±%
Labour	David Mort	Unopposed		
Registered electors				
Labour hold				

General election 1945: Swansea East
Party	Candidate	Votes	%	±%
Labour	David Mort	19,127	75.8	N/A
National Liberal	Rowe Harding	6,102	24.2	N/A
Majority		13,025	51.6	N/A
Turnout		25,229	74.7	N/A
Registered electors		33,668		
Labour hold		Swing	N/A	

=== Elections in the 1950s ===
General election 1950: Swansea East
Party	Candidate	Votes	%	±%
Labour	David Mort	32,680	75.3	−0.5
Conservative	J F Lynam	10,712	24.7	+0.5
Majority		21,968	50.6	−1.0
Turnout		43,392	81.8	+7.1
Registered electors		53,014		
Labour hold		Swing		

General election 1951: Swansea East
Party	Candidate	Votes	%	±%
Labour	David Mort	32,790	73.6	−1.7
Conservative	Jack C. Hope	11,768	26.4	+1.7
Majority		21,022	47.2	−3.4
Turnout		44,558	82.8	+1.0
Registered electors		53,790		
Labour hold		Swing		

General election 1955: Swansea East
Party	Candidate	Votes	%	±%
Labour	David Mort	28,198	72.4	−1.2
Conservative	R Sarah Guest	10,726	27.6	+1.2
Majority		17,472	44.8	−2.4
Turnout		38,924	72.1	−10.7
Registered electors		54,010		
Labour hold		Swing		

General election 1959: Swansea East
Party	Candidate	Votes	%	±%
Labour	David Mort	29,884	67.5	−4.9
Conservative	Humphry J. F. Crum Ewing	9,754	22.0	−5.6
Plaid Cymru	Chris Rees	4,651	10.5	N/A
Majority		20,130	45.5	+0.7
Turnout		44,289	80.1	+8.0
Registered electors		55,301		
Labour hold		Swing		

=== Elections in the 1960s ===
1963 Swansea East by-election
Party	Candidate	Votes	%	±%
Labour	Neil McBride	18,909	61.1	−6.4
Liberal	R Owens	4,895	15.8	N/A
People's Party	L Atkin	2,462	8.0	N/A
Conservative	A P Thomas	2,272	7.3	−14.7
Plaid Cymru	Chris Rees	1,620	5.2	−5.3
Communist	Bert Pearce	773	2.5	N/A
Majority		14,014	45.3	−0.2
Turnout		30,931	55.9	−24.2
Registered electors		55,328		
Labour hold		Swing		

General election 1964: Swansea East
Party	Candidate	Votes	%	±%
Labour	Neil McBride	30,904	73.0	+5.5
Conservative	Oliver C. Wright	7,863	18.6	−3.4
Plaid Cymru	Chris Rees	3,556	8.4	−2.1
Majority		23,041	54.4	+8.9
Turnout		42,323	76.2	−3.9
Registered electors		55,505		
Labour hold		Swing		

General election 1966: Swansea East
Party	Candidate	Votes	%	±%
Labour	Neil McBride	30,290	75.4	+2.4
Conservative	Timothy Knowles	6,241	15.5	−3.1
Plaid Cymru	Chris Rees	2,749	6.8	−1.4
Communist	William R. Jones	902	2.2	N/A
Majority		24,049	59.9	+5.5
Turnout		40,182	73.8	−2.4
Registered electors		54,459		
Labour hold		Swing		

=== Elections in the 1970s ===
General election 1970: Swansea East
Party	Candidate	Votes	%	±%
Labour	Neil McBride	28,183	68.5	−6.9
Conservative	Michael J. Murphy	8,191	19.9	+4.4
Plaid Cymru	Roderick Evans	4,188	10.2	+3.4
Communist	William R. Jones	563	1.4	−0.8
Majority		19,992	48.6	−11.3
Turnout		41,125	70.1	−3.7
Registered electors		58,653		
Labour hold		Swing		

General election February 1974: Swansea East
Party	Candidate	Votes	%	±%
Labour	Neil McBride	28,537	66.3	−2.2
Conservative	David Mercer	8,850	20.6	+0.7
Plaid Cymru	John Ball	5,135	11.9	+1.7
Communist	W R Jones	507	1.2	−0.2
Majority		19,687	45.7	−2.9
Turnout		43,029	73.8	+3.7
Registered electors		58,301		
Labour hold		Swing		

General election October 1974: Swansea East
Party	Candidate	Votes	%	±%
Labour	Donald Anderson	26,735	63.8	−2.5
Conservative	David Mercer	6,014	14.3	−6.3
Liberal	Roger Anstey	5,173	12.3	N/A
Plaid Cymru	John Ball	3,978	9.5	−2.4
Majority		20,721	49.5	+3.8
Turnout		41,900	71.3	−2.5
Registered electors		58,780		
Labour hold		Swing		

General election 1979: Swansea East
Party	Candidate	Votes	%	±%
Labour	Donald Anderson	31,909	69.9	+6.1
Conservative	S Edwards	10,689	23.4	+9.1
Plaid Cymru	John Ball	2,732	6.0	−3.5
Communist	W Jones	308	0.7	N/A
Majority		21,220	46.5	−3.0
Turnout		45,638	75.6	+4.3
Registered electors		60,350		
Labour hold		Swing		

=== Elections in the 1980s ===
General election 1983: Swansea East
Party	Candidate	Votes	%	±%
Labour	Donald Anderson	22,297	54.4	−15.5
Liberal	Martyn J. Shrewsbury	8,762	21.4	N/A
Conservative	Nicholas O'Shaughnessy	8,080	19.7	−3.7
Plaid Cymru	Clive Reid	1,531	3.7	−2.3
Communist	W R Jones	294	0.7	±0.0
Majority		13,535	33.0	−13.5
Turnout		40,964	71.5	−4.1
Registered electors		57,285		
Labour hold		Swing		

General election 1987: Swansea East
Party	Candidate	Votes	%	±%
Labour	Donald Anderson	27,478	63.7	+9.3
Conservative	Richard Lewis	8,140	18.9	−0.8
Liberal	David Thomas	6,380	14.8	−6.6
Plaid Cymru	Clive Reid	1,145	2.6	−1.1
Majority		19,338	44.8	+11.8
Turnout		43,143	75.4	+3.9
Registered electors		57,200		
Labour hold		Swing		

=== Elections in the 1990s ===
General election 1992: Swansea East
Party	Candidate	Votes	%	±%
Labour	Donald Anderson	31,179	69.7	+6.0
Conservative	Henry L. Davies	7,697	17.2	−1.7
Liberal Democrats	Robert E. Barton	4,248	9.5	−5.3
Plaid Cymru	Eleanor E. Bonner-Evans	1,607	3.6	+1.0
Majority		23,482	52.5	+7.7
Turnout		44,731	75.6	+0.2
Registered electors		59,196		
Labour hold		Swing	+3.8	

General election 1997: Swansea East
Party	Candidate	Votes	%	±%
Labour	Donald Anderson	29,151	75.4	+5.7
Conservative	Catherine Dibble	3,582	9.3	−7.9
Liberal Democrats	Elwyn Jones	3,440	8.9	−0.6
Plaid Cymru	Michelle Pooley	1,308	3.4	−0.2
Referendum	Catherine Maggs	904	2.3	N/A
Socialist	Ronnie Job	289	0.8	N/A
Majority		25,569	66.1	+13.6
Turnout		38,674	67.4	−8.2
Registered electors		57,371		
Labour hold		Swing	+6.8	

=== Elections in the 2000s ===
General election 2001: Swansea East
Party	Candidate	Votes	%	±%
Labour	Donald Anderson	19,612	65.2	−10.2
Plaid Cymru	John Ball	3,464	11.5	+8.1
Liberal Democrats	Robert Speht	3,064	10.2	+1.3
Conservative	Paul Morris	3,026	10.1	+0.8
Green	Tony Young	463	1.5	N/A
UKIP	Tim Jenkins	443	1.5	N/A
Majority		16,148	53.7	−12.4
Turnout		30,072	52.3	−15.1
Registered electors		57,520		
Labour hold		Swing	-9.2	

General election 2005: Swansea East
Party	Candidate	Votes	%	±%
Labour	Siân James	17,457	56.6	−8.6
Liberal Democrats	Robert Speht	6,208	20.1	+9.9
Conservative	Ellenor Bland	3,103	10.1	±0.0
Plaid Cymru	Carolyn Couch	2,129	6.9	−4.6
BNP	Kevin Holloway	770	2.5	N/A
UKIP	Tim Jenkins	674	2.2	+0.7
Green	Tony Young	493	1.6	+0.1
Majority		11,249	36.5	−17.2
Turnout		30,834	52.4	+0.1
Registered electors		57,502		
Labour hold		Swing	-9.3	

=== Elections in the 2010s ===
General election 2010: Swansea East
Party	Candidate	Votes	%	±%
Labour	Siân James	16,819	51.5	−5.1
Liberal Democrats	Robert Speht	5,981	18.3	−1.8
Conservative	Christian Holliday	4,823	14.8	+4.7
Plaid Cymru	Dic Jones	2,181	6.7	−0.2
BNP	Clive Bennett	1,715	5.2	+2.7
UKIP	David Rogers	839	2.6	+0.4
Green	Tony Young	318	1.0	−0.6
Majority		10,838	33.2	−3.3
Turnout		32,676	54.6	+2.2
Registered electors		59,823		
Labour hold		Swing	-1.7	

General election 2015: Swansea East
Party	Candidate	Votes	%	±%
Labour	Carolyn Harris	17,807	53.0	+1.5
UKIP	Clifford Johnson	5,779	17.2	+14.6
Conservative	Altaf Hussain	5,142	15.3	+0.5
Plaid Cymru	Dic Jones	3,498	10.4	+3.7
Liberal Democrats	Amina Jamal	1,392	4.1	−14.2
Rejected ballots		107		
Majority		12,028	35.8	+2.6
Turnout		33,618	58.0	+3.4
Registered electors		58,011		
Labour hold		Swing	-6.5	

Of the 107 rejected ballots:

- 81 were either unmarked or it was uncertain who the vote was for.
- 25 voted for more than one candidate.
- 1 had writing or mark by which the voter could be identified.

General election 2017: Swansea East
Party	Candidate	Votes	%	±%
Labour	Carolyn Harris	22,307	63.4	+10.4
Conservative	Dan Boucher	9,139	26.0	+10.7
Plaid Cymru	Steffan Phillips	1,689	4.8	−5.6
UKIP	Clifford Johnson	1,040	3.0	−14.2
Liberal Democrats	Charley Hasted	625	1.8	−2.3
Green	Chris Evans	359	1.0	N/A
Majority		13,168	37.4	+1.6
Turnout		35,159	60.1	+2.1
Registered electors		58,526		
Labour hold		Swing	-0.1	

General election 2019: Swansea East
Party	Candidate	Votes	%	±%
Labour	Carolyn Harris	17,405	51.8	−11.6
Conservative	Denise Howard	9,435	28.1	+2.1
Brexit Party	Tony Willicombe	2,842	8.5	N/A
Plaid Cymru	Geraint Havard	1,905	5.7	+0.9
Liberal Democrats	Chloe Hutchinson	1,409	4.2	+2.4
Green	Chris Evans	583	1.7	+0.7
Rejected ballots		66		
Majority		7,970	23.7	−13.7
Turnout		33,579	57.4	−2.7
Registered electors		58,450		
Labour hold		Swing	-6.9	

Of the 66 rejected ballots:

- 50 were either unmarked or it was uncertain who the vote was for.
- 12 voted for more than one candidate.
- 4 had writing or mark by which the voter could be identified.

== See also ==
- Swansea East (Senedd constituency)
- List of parliamentary constituencies in West Glamorgan
- List of parliamentary constituencies in Wales
