= Baron Swansea =

Barony in the Peerage of the United Kingdom

- Creation date: 9 June 1893
- Created by: Queen Victoria
- Peerage: Peerage of the United Kingdom
- First holder: Henry Hussey Vivian
- Present holder: Richard Anthony Hussey Vivian, 5th Baron Swansea (born 1957)
- Heir apparent: James Henry Hussey Vivian (born 1999)
- Remainder to: 1st Earl's heirs male of the body lawfully begotten
- Status: Extant

Baron Swansea, of Singleton in the County of Glamorgan, is a title in the Peerage of the United Kingdom and held by a branch of the Vivian family. It was created on 9 June 1893 for the industrialist Sir Henry Vivian, 1st Baronet. He had already been created a Baronet, of Singleton in the County of Glamorgan, on 13 May 1882. He was succeeded by his eldest son, the second Baron. On his death the titles passed to his half-brother, the third Baron. As of 2014 the titles are held by the latter's grandson, the fifth Baron, who succeeded his father in 2005.

John Henry Vivian, father of the first Baron, was an industrialist and politician. The soldier Hussey Vivian, 1st Baron Vivian, was the uncle of the first Baron. The Liberal politician Sir Arthur Vivian was the younger brother of the first Baron.

== Vivian baronets, of Singleton (1882) ==
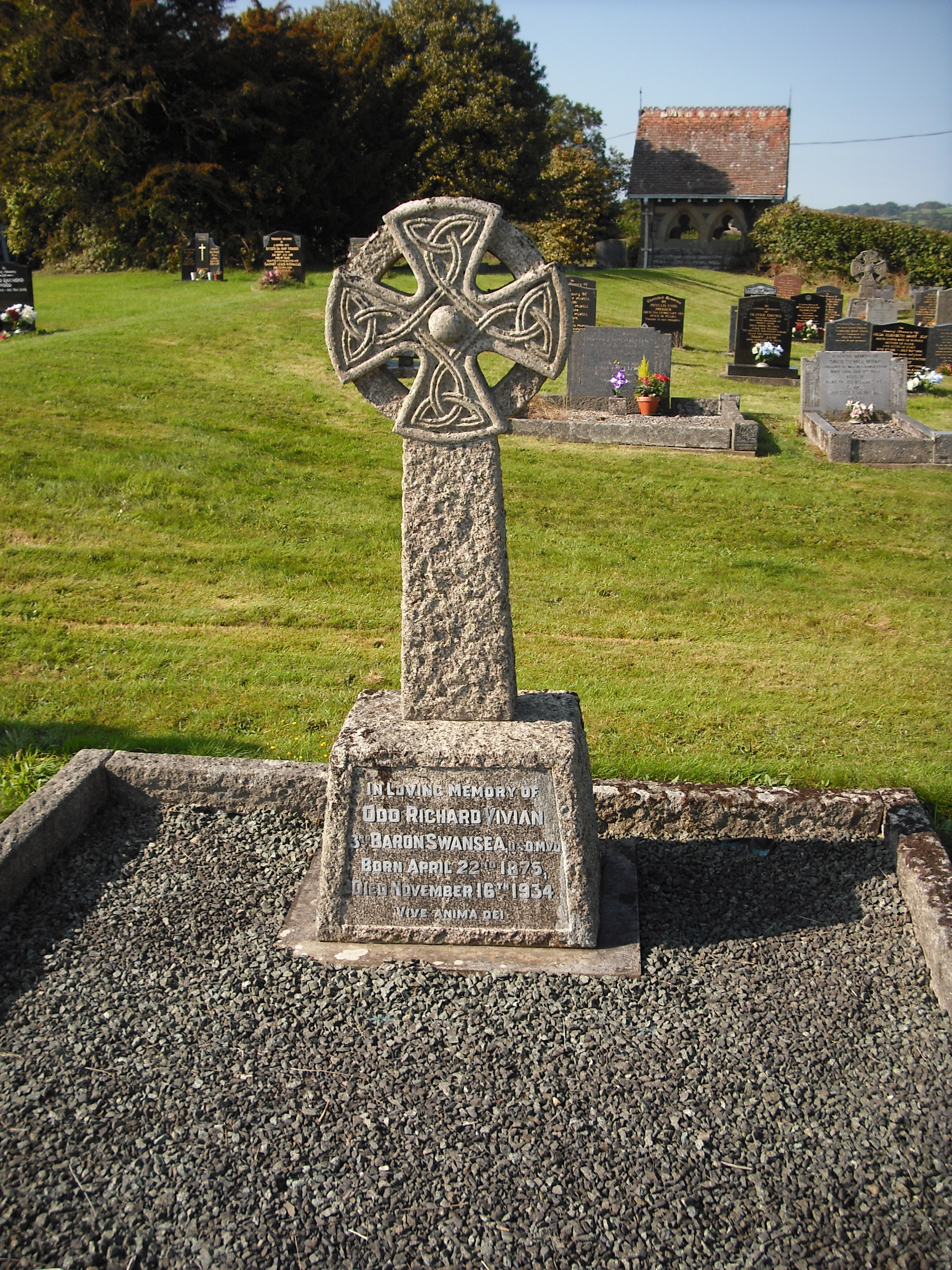
Grave of Odo Vivian, 3rd Baron Swansea, at St. David's Church, Maesmynis, Builth Wells.

- Henry Hussey Vivian, 1st Baronet (1821–1894) (created Baron Swansea in 1893)

=== Baron Swansea (1893) ===
- Henry Hussey Vivian, 1st Baron Swansea (1821–1894)
- Ernest Ambrose Vivian, 2nd Baron Swansea (1848–1922)
- Odo Richard Vivian, 3rd Baron Swansea (1875–1934)
- John Hussey Hamilton Vivian, 4th Baron Swansea (1925–2005)
- Richard Anthony Hussey Vivian, 5th Baron Swansea (born 1957)

The heir apparent is the present holder's son, the Hon. James Henry Hussey Vivian (born 1999).

=== Title succession chart ===
Title succession chart, Vivian baronets (of Singleton) and Barons Swansea.

Henry Vivian; 1st Baron Swansea; 1821–1894
Ernest Vivian; 2nd Baron Swansea; 1848–1922	Hon. John Vivian; 1854–1898	Hon. Henry Vivian; 1873–1898	Odo Vivian; 3rd Baron Swansea; 1875–1934
John Vivian; 4th Baron Swansea; 1925–2005
Richard Vivian; 5th Baron Swansea born 1957
Hon. James Vivian born 1999

== Arms ==
Coat of arms of the Barons Swansea
Crest Dexter: A lion's head erased proper charged with two bezants palewise and gorged with a collar gules thereon three annulets or with a chain of the last; Sinister: Issuant from a bridge of one arch embattled and having at each end a tower proper, a demi-hussar in the uniform of the 18th Regiment holding in his right hand a sabre and in his left a red pennon flying to the sinister. Escutcheon Or on a chevron azure between three lions' heads erased proper as many annulets gold on a chief embattled gules a wreath of oak Or between two martlets argent. Supporters Dexter: A dragon wings elevated gules gorged with a collar or charged with three torteaux; Sinister: A horse argent saddle and bridle proper trappings gules gorged with a collar sable charged with three bezants. Motto Vive Anima Dei (Live by the spirit of God)

== See also ==
- Vivian family
- Baron Vivian

== Notes ==
Baronetage of the United Kingdom
Preceded by Sullivan baronets	Vivian baronets of Singleton; 13 May 1882	Succeeded by Matheson baronets
