= Neil McBride =

British Labour Party politician

Swansea East, constituency for which McBride was MP

Neil McBride (13 April 1910 – 9 September 1974) was a British Labour Party politician.

He was Member of Parliament for Swansea East from a by-election in 1963 until his death, aged 64, shortly before the October 1974 general election. He was a government whip from 1966 to 1970.

== Life ==
Neil McBride, named after his father, was born in Neilston in Scotland. He attended his local Catholic school, St. Thomas's School, and later the National Labour College. He worked for James Brown and Co. of Clydebank as a brass finisher until his election to parliament in 1963.

McBride's hobbies included reading and the spread of socialism. He also was a keen traveller, travelling to various parts of Europe, Africa, South America and the Middle East. He married Delia Maloney from Paisley on 12 June 1937. They lived in Brynhyfryd, Swansea.

McBride died on 9 September 1974 in his home after a seven-month illness.

== Political career ==
McBride began his political career by joining the Amalgamated Engineering Union in 1937 followed by the Labour Party in 1940, in addition to being part of the Co-operative Party and the Paisley Labour Party; he served as chairman of Paisley CLP from 1950 to 1962. In the October 1951, McBride contested Perth and East Perthshire but was unsuccessful. Similarly, he lost the High Peak division of Derbyshire in 1955.

Neil took over from D. L. Mort as the Swansea East MP in March 1963 following a by-election. He was the third Scottish man ever to represent a constituency in Wales as MP. From 1964 to 1966, McBride was both secretary to the PLP trades union group and chairman of the PLP transport committee. Following the 1966 general election, he served as government whip (1966–70) and Lord Commissioner to the Treasury (1969–70).Though the Labour government was defeated in 1970, McBride maintained his role as opposition whip in parliament. In addition, he was chairman of the Welsh Labour Parliamentary Group (1972–73). McBride won the February 1974 election by 19,687 votes but never joined the new parliament due to illness.

Parliament of the United Kingdom
Preceded by David Mort	Member of Parliament for Swansea East; 1963 – Oct 1974	Succeeded by Donald Anderson
