= David Mercer (broadcaster) =

British sports broadcaster (1950–2020)

David Mercer (15 April 1950 – 26 August 2020) was a Welsh television sports commentator and presenter, most associated with tennis after his previous career as an umpire in the sport, taking charge of the 1984 Wimbledon men's singles final.

== Early life and legal career ==
Mercer was born in Swansea and educated at Dynevor School, at the time a state grammar school known as Dynevor Secondary Grammar School. He went on to study at the University of Nottingham. He played most sports at school and university, and won the Welsh junior doubles at tennis in 1968. In 1969, he was captain of the Nottingham University tennis team. He graduated in 1972 and qualified as a solicitor in 1973.

Mercer was a partner in a large solicitors’ firm in Swansea for nine years. He became a freelance sports reporter after winning a competition organised by BBC Wales in 1979, for a time combining this work with his legal practice and with public relations duties for the Law Society. Alongside his legal career, he also stood as the Conservative parliamentary candidate in Swansea East at the February and October 1974 general elections and in Swansea West at the 1979 general election.

== Tennis career ==
He umpired at tennis including Wimbledon from 1973 to 1984, notably the men's singles final at Wimbledon in 1984, won by John McEnroe against Jimmy Connors. On the verge of becoming one of the tour's first paid international umpires, Mercer moved into tennis commentary for BBC radio in 1985, commentating on the French Open and Wimbledon alongside Tony Adamson on BBC Radio 2, and became known for his humorous tone.

After commentating on the 1992 Wimbledon Championships and Olympics for BBC Radio, Mercer moved across to BBC Television in the aftermath of the retirement of veteran TV tennis commentator Dan Maskell, making his BBC TV tennis debut at the 1992 US Open.

Mercer became one of the most prominent voices of tennis on British television for the next 28 years, including commentating on the Wimbledon men's singles finals in 1999 and 2000 on BBC television. In addition, he also commentated from the early 1990s for Eurosport on their coverage of the Australian, French and US Opens, and weekly WTA tournaments. He also commentated for BT Sport in the 2010s.

He was the only person to have both umpired and commentated on a Wimbledon men's singles final, covering 35 Wimbledon tournaments as a broadcaster in addition to his 12 as an umpire. The 2019 edition turned out to be his last. He was due to work once more on the 2020 tournament, but it was cancelled due to the COVID-19 pandemic.

== Other sports commentary ==
As well as tennis, Mercer commentated on other sports including badminton, football, rowing, skiing, and American football. He was on the BBC Radio rugby commentary team in the late 1980s and early 1990s, including the 1991 Rugby World Cup, and commentated for Rugby Special on BBC TV during the same period. He became the BBC's regular badminton commentator at Commonwealth and Olympic Games, starting at Sydney 2000.

In rowing, Mercer had a 33-year association with The Boat Race, first working on the historic event alongside Peter Jones in 1987, later becoming lead commentator for the race on BBC Radio, and was still working on the event up to the time of his death. He was never able to work at the Henley Regatta due to it directly clashing with Wimbledon.

Early in his broadcasting career, Mercer hosted sports bulletins on BBC Radio 4's Today programme, and on at least one occasion hosted Soccer Special on BBC Radio 2.

Mercer played tennis, rugby, football and cricket. Later in his life, he played golf.

== Personal life ==
Mercer lived in Wendover in Buckinghamshire, with his third wife Sue. He had one daughter, Caroline, from his first marriage, two stepchildren, Liz and Chris, and four grandchildren.

Mercer died on 26 August 2020, at the age of 70.
