= 1915 Swansea District by-election =

UK Parliamentary by-election

The 1915 Swansea District by-election was held on 6 February 1915. The by-election was held due to the incumbent Liberal MP, David Brynmor Jones, becoming a High Court Judge. It was won by the Liberal candidate Thomas Jeremiah Williams who was unopposed due to a War-time electoral pact.

1915 Swansea District by-election
Party	Candidate	Votes	%	±%
Liberal	Thomas Williams	Unopposed		
Registered electors				
Liberal hold				
