= David Matthews (British politician) =

David Matthews (1868 – 26 February 1960) was a Liberal Party politician in the United Kingdom.

== Parliamentary politics ==
Matthews was elected as a Coalition Liberal member of parliament (MP) for Swansea East (UK Parliament constituency) at a by-election in 1919 following the death of the Liberal MP Thomas Jeremiah Williams. He stepped down from Parliament at the 1922 general election, and did not stand again.

== Welsh MP ==
Matthews was a strong supporter of the premiership of David Lloyd George and regarded himself as something of a Welsh nationalist. In 1920 he was one of a group of Welsh MPs who called on the prime minister to create the post of Secretary of State for Wales but Lloyd George apparently urged them to fight for greater devolution instead. However, in February 1921 Matthews attempted to introduce a Bill to institute the post of Welsh Secretary but without success.

== Swansea politician ==
At the time of his election to Parliament, Matthews was a leading member of the civic community in Swansea. He was a member of Swansea Council and was a justice of the peace, having twice been Chief Magistrate. He was a prominent nonconformist in the area and popular with chapel-goers. In 1924 the Freedom of Swansea was bestowed on him, by which time he was an Alderman of Swansea Council.

== Business ==
In business, Matthews was a merchant, a director of the South Wales Fuel Company Ltd. and owner of the Park Tinplate Company Ltd.

Parliament of the United Kingdom
Preceded by Thomas Jeremiah Williams	Member of Parliament for Swansea East; 1919 – 1922	Succeeded by David Williams
