= Kelvin Thomas =

Welsh conductor, composer, baritone, and author (1919–2019)

Kelvin Thomas MBE
- Born: Kelvin Skidmore Matthewson Thomas; 14 September 1919; Cardiff, Wales
- Died: 14 June 2019 (aged 99); Bath, Somerset, UK
- Spouse: Megan Jones (m. 1942; died 2012)
- Musical career
- Genres: Classical
- Occupations: Conductor; Composer
- Instruments: Piano; Violin; Baritone
- Years active: 1951–2019

Kelvin Skidmore Matthewson Thomas MBE (14 September 1919 – 14 June 2019) was a Welsh conductor, composer, baritone, and author. He was the founder and conductor of The Silver Ring Choir of Bath, and one of the founders and first music director of the Bradford-on-Avon Choral Society.

== Background ==
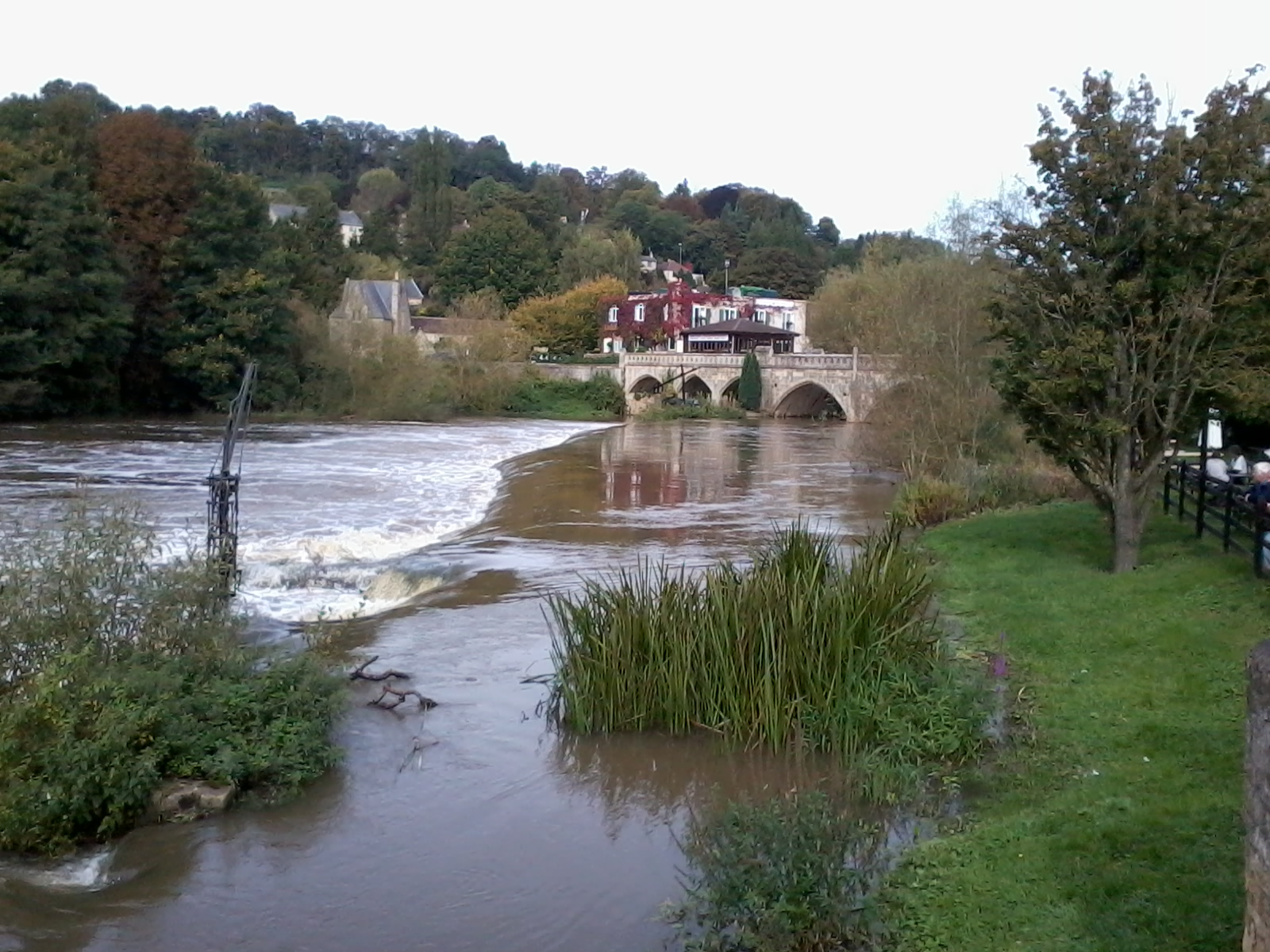
River Avon, Bathampton, Somerset

Born in Grangetown, Cardiff, Wales, Kelvin was one of the five children of the coal merchant Charles Thomas and his wife Lena Thomas. He received musical training from an early age from his musical parents.

As a boy soprano from the age of five, in 1931 (aged twelve) he had a test recording for the Concord record label (the recording was never released). In 1927, the Thomas family removed from Cardiff to Bathampton near Bath, Somerset, and were later involved in the building of Bathampton Methodist Church. During his early years of performances, Thomas once performed in the same concert as the American actor and bass baritone Paul Robeson at the Colston Hall, Bristol.

Having continued his musical studies (also playing the violin and piano) throughout his early years, and his interest in singing continued as a baritone (rather than soprano). After a period employed in his father's business as a coal merchant, he worked for the Engineering firm, Stothert and Pitt.

== Musical Activities ==
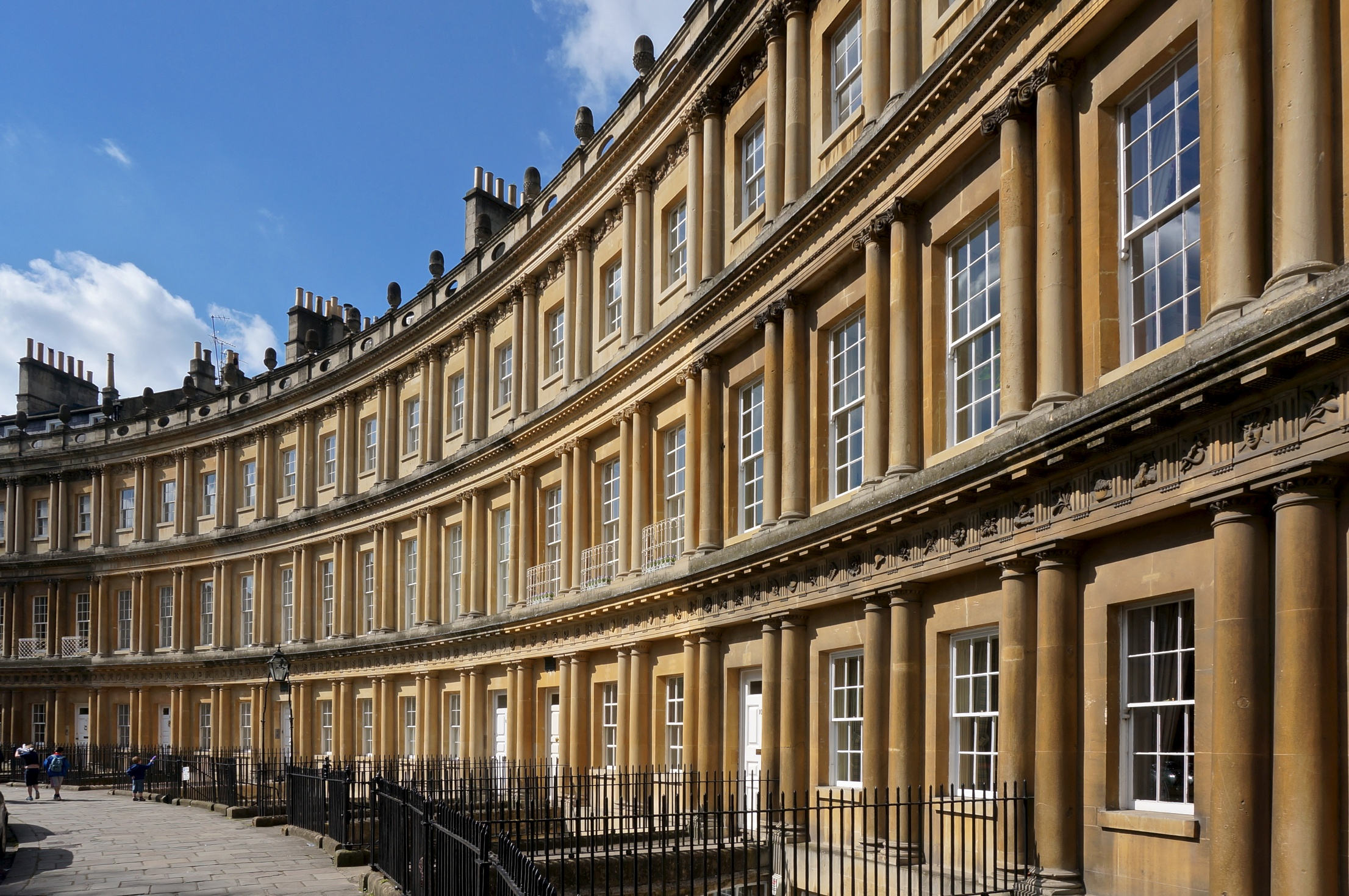
The Circus, Bath, Somerset

=== The Silver Ring Choir of Bath ===
In 1951, he founded the mixed voice chamber choir, The Silver Ring Choir of Bath, and was their Conductor and Musical Director for almost forty years (1951–90). During this time, the Choir featured regularly on BBC Radio and Television (1958–94), achieving great success and winning numerous competitions, including first in its class in the National Eisteddfod of Wales. The Choir also toured various countries including Germany (1961), Hungary (1971), and the United States (1976).

=== Bradford-on-Avon Choral Society ===
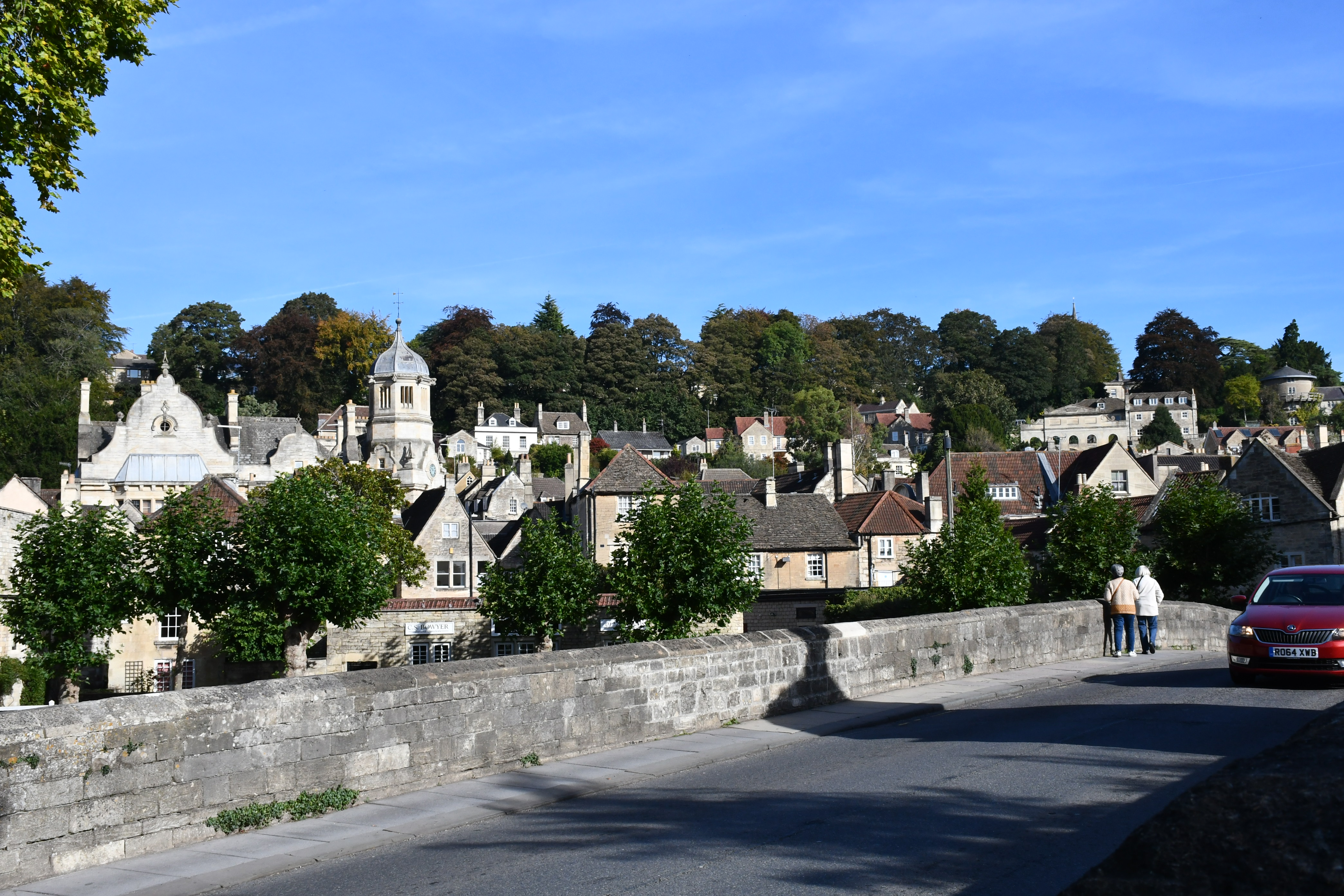
Bradford-on-Avon, Wiltshire

In 1986, when the pianist Gaynor Briscoe was founding the Bradford-on-Avon Choral Society, she invited him to become the Society's first Musical Director, a post which he filled for eight years (1986–94). From initial performances of part songs, anthems, and madrigals, the choir progressed to performing works such as Haydn's Creation, Mendelssohn's Elijah, and Brahms's German Requiem, and later participated in annual Trowbridge and West Wiltshire Music Festivals, amongst others. Thomas also arranged and composed numerous pieces of music for these – and other – choirs (SATB), including many traditional Welsh and other melodies. One of his compositions was Samuel's Hymn, which he later recorded with The Silver Ring Choir of Bath.

=== Other activities ===
In addition to being a poet and composer, Thomas was also involved in several local and civic societies and organisations, including the Bathampton Historical Society, and was the author of works on local history. Thomas's lifelong involvement with Bathampton Methodist Church and musical career culminated, in 2013, in a fundraising concert held in his honour entitled My Life in Music during which his music, poetry, and compositions were performed. In 2017, aged 98, he again performed with The Silver Ring Choir of Bath in a Christmas Concert.

== Awards ==
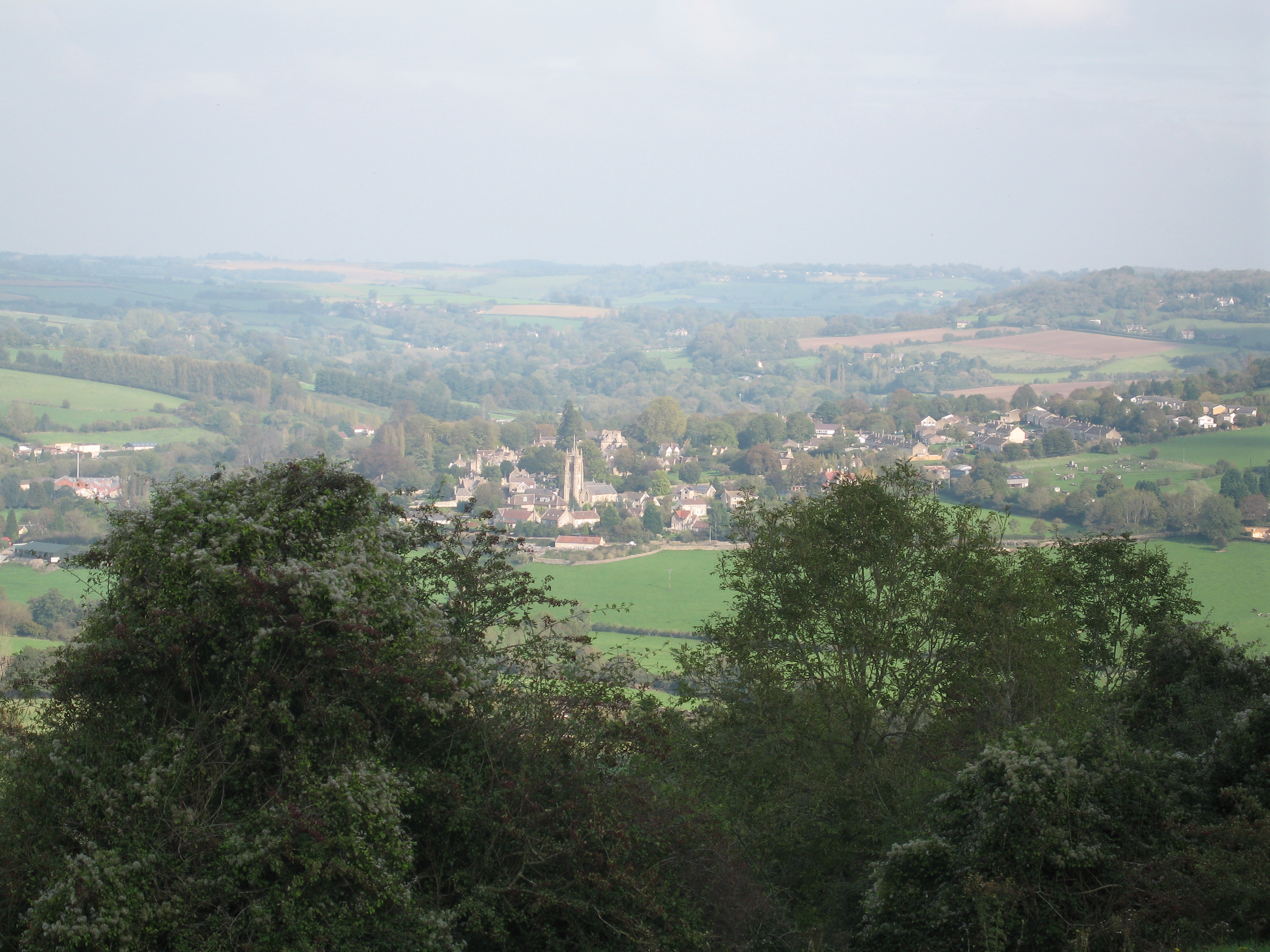
Bathampton, Somerset

Thomas's notable local, national, and international activities and contribution to Music was recognised in his appointment as a Member of the Order of the British Empire (MBE) in the 1981 New Year Honours List.

== Personal life ==
In 1942, Thomas married Megan Jones (1921–2012), and they had five children (two boys and three girls). Singing on the weekend before he died, Thomas died, aged 99, at the Royal United Hospital, Bath, on 14 June 2019.

== Bibliography ==
=== Books ===
- Thomas, K.S.M. (1989), Bathampton I Knew, Bath, ISBN 978-0-95173-617-3
- Bates, E. Ralph; Crofts, Bruce; Thomas, K.S.M. (1990), At Satan's Throne: The Story of Methodism in Bath over 250 Years, Bristol: White Tree Books, ISBN 0948265493
- Thomas, K.S.M. (1991), My Spirit Sang All Day, Bath, ISBN 978-0-95173-610-4

=== Musical arrangements ===
- Thomas, K.S.M. (1998), Iwerron lân (Londonderry Air) (in Welsh), Caernarfon: Curiad
- Thomas, K.S.M. (1998), Tywysog Hedd (Prince of Peace) (in Welsh), Caernarfon: Curiad
- Thomas, K.S.M. (1998), Yr eneth gadd ei gwrthod (The Rejected Maiden) (in Welsh), Caernarfon: Curiad
- Thomas, K.S.M. (1999), Suo gân (Lullaby) (in Welsh), Caernarfon: Curiad
- Thomas, K.S.M. (1999), Y deryn pur: alaw traddodiadol (The Gentle Dove) (in Welsh), Caernarfon: Curiad
- Thomas, K.S.M. (2000), Tros y garreg (Over the Stone) (in Welsh), Caernarfon: Curiad
- Thomas, K.S.M. (2001), Lliw gwyn rhosyn yr haf (White Wild Midsummer Rose) (in Welsh), Caernarfon: Curiad
- Thomas, K.S.M. (2001), Ar hyd y nos (in Welsh), Caernarfon: Curiad
- Thomas, K.S.M.; Kennedy, Angus (2004), Isle of Arran: For Unaccompanied Mixed Voice Choir, Tewkesbury: Roberton Publications

=== Compositions ===
- Thomas, K.S.M. (1996), 'Roedd gan yr Arglwydd dasg (The Lord he had a job) (in Welsh), Caernarfon: Curiad
- Thomas, K.S.M. (2000), Wrth y dyfroedd ym Mabilon (By the Waters of Babylon) (in Welsh), Caernarfon: Curiad

== Discography ==
- Songs of the British Isles: Kelvin Thomas and the Silver Ring Choir, LP. Label: One-Up, 1976
- One Bathampton Evening: Kelvin Thomas MBE (Baritone) and Hilary Bryant (Piano), CD. Label: Cottage Pie, 2014

Cultural offices
Preceded by Creation	Conductor, The Silver Ring Choir of Bath; 1951–90	Succeeded by Philip Draisey
Preceded by Creation	Conductor, Bradford on Avon Choral Society; 1986–94	Succeeded by Simon Ible
