= 1940 Swansea East by-election =

UK by-election

The 1940 Swansea East by-election was a parliamentary by-election held for the British House of Commons constituency of Swansea East on 5 February 1940. The seat had become vacant on the resignation from the House of Commons of the Labour Member of Parliament David Williams, who had held the seat since the 1922 general election.

During World War II, the major parties had agreed not to contest by-elections when vacancies arose in seats held by the other parties, so the Labour candidate, David Mort, was returned unopposed. Mort represented the constituency until his death in 1963, triggering another by-election.

== Result ==
1940 Swansea East by-election
Party	Candidate	Votes	%	±%
Labour	David Mort	Unopposed		
Registered electors				
Labour hold				

== See also ==
- Swansea East (UK Parliament constituency)
- 1919 Swansea East by-election
- 1963 Swansea East by-election
- List of United Kingdom by-elections
