= 1919 Swansea East by-election =

UK parliamentary by-election

- 10 July 1919 (Polling); 23 July 1919 (Declaration)
- Registered: 27,185
- Turnout: 64.0%
| | Nat | Lab |
| Candidate | David Matthews | David Williams |
| Party | National Liberal | Labour |
| Alliance | Coalition |
| Popular vote | 9,250 | 8,158 |
| Percentage | 53.1% | 46.9% |
| Swing | ▼10.5% | ▲10.5% |
MP before election
Jeremiah Williams
National Liberal
Subsequent MP
David Matthews
National Liberal

The 1919 Swansea East by-election was a parliamentary by-election held for the British House of Commons constituency of Swansea East on 10 July 1919.

== Background ==
T.J. Williams

The seat had become vacant when the Coalition Liberal Member of Parliament (MP) Jeremiah Williams had died on 12 June 1919, aged 46. He had held the seat since its creation at the 1918 general election.

=== Electoral history ===
General election 1918: Swansea East
| Party | | Candidate | Votes | % |
|---|---|---|---|---|
| C | National Liberal | Jeremiah Williams | 11,071 | 63.6 |
| | Labour | David Williams | 6,341 | 36.4 |
| Majority | | | 4,730 | 27.2 |
| Turnout | | | 17,411 | 64.1 |
| Registered electors | | | 27,185 | |
| | National Liberal win (new seat) | | | |
C indicates candidate endorsed by the coalition government.

== Candidates ==
=== Coalition Liberal ===
- David Matthews, Swansea Town Council councillor, former Mayor of Swansea and merchant

=== Labour ===
- David Williams, Swansea Town Council councillor, former Mayor of Swansea, boilermaker and candidate for this seat in 1918

== Campaign ==
At a Labour Party conference in June, a resolution was passed in favour of using the strike weapon for political purposes.

== Result ==
The Coalition Liberal candidate, David Matthews, held the seat for his party, but with a greatly reduced majority.

1919 Swansea East by-election
| Party | | Candidate | Votes | % | ±% |
|---|---|---|---|---|---|
| C | National Liberal | David Matthews | 9,250 | 53.1 | –10.5 |
| | Labour | David Williams | 8,158 | 46.9 | +10.5 |
| Majority | | | 1,092 | 6.2 | −21.0 |
| Turnout | | | 17,408 | 64.0 | −0.1 |
| Registered electors | | | 27,185 | | |
| | National Liberal hold | | Swing | –10.5 | |
C indicates candidate endorsed by the coalition government.

== Aftermath ==
David Williams stood again at the 1922 general election and won the seat for the Labour Party.

== See also ==
- Swansea East constituency
- 1940 Swansea East by-election
- 1963 Swansea East by-election
- Swansea
- List of United Kingdom by-elections (1918–1931)
- United Kingdom by-election records
