= 1963 Swansea East by-election =

UK parliamentary by-election

The 1963 Swansea East by-election was a parliamentary by-election held for the British House of Commons constituency of Swansea East on 28 March 1963.

The seat had become vacant when the Labour Member of Parliament (MP) David Mort had died on 1 January 1963, aged 74. He had held the seat since being elected unopposed at a by-election in 1940.

The Labour candidate, Neil McBride, held the seat for his party.

== Result ==
1963 Swansea East by-election
| Party | Candidate | Votes | % | ±% |
|---|---|---|---|---|
| Labour | Neil McBride | 18,909 | 61.1 | −6.4 |
| Liberal | R. Owens | 4,895 | 15.8 | N/A |
| People's Party | L Atkin | 2,462 | 8.0 | N/A |
| Conservative | A. P. Thomas | 2,272 | 7.3 | −14.7 |
| Plaid Cymru | Chris Rees | 1,620 | 5.2 | −5.3 |
| Communist | Bert Pearce | 773 | 2.5 | N/A |
| Majority | | 14,014 | 45.3 | −0.2 |
| Turnout | | 30,931 | 55.9 | −24.2 |
| Registered electors | | 55,328 | | |
| Labour hold | | Swing | | |

== See also ==
- Swansea East constituency
- 1919 Swansea East by-election
- 1940 Swansea East by-election
- Swansea
- List of United Kingdom by-elections
- United Kingdom by-election records
