= Swansea District =

UK Parliament constituency (1832–1918)

- Former borough constituency for the House of Commons

1832–1918
- Seats: one
- Created from: Cardiff
- Replaced by: Aberavon and Neath

Swansea District before 1885 also known as Swansea District of Boroughs was a borough constituency. It was represented in the House of Commons of the Parliament of the United Kingdom. It elected one Member of Parliament (MP) by the first past the post system of election.

== Overview ==
The seat was created for the 1832 general election, and abolished for the 1918 general election. Swansea District was a strongly Liberal constituency, dominated by the tinplate and steel industries, together with coal.

== Boundaries ==
Upon its creation in 1832 it comprised five small boroughs: Swansea, Neath, Aberavon, Kenfig and Loughor. A small increase in their limits occurred in 1868.

In 1885, the seat was split into two, with the central part of Swansea borough forming the Swansea Town constituency, and the northern part of Swansea borough centred on Morriston, together with the four smaller boroughs, forming the seat Swansea District.

The first member after 1885 was Henry Vivian, who had represented Glamorgan county 1857–1885.

== Members of Parliament ==
- Constituency created (1832)

Year	Member	Whip
1832	John Henry Vivian	Whig
1855	Lewis Llewelyn Dillwyn	Whig
1859	Lewis Llewelyn Dillwyn	Liberal
1885	Sir Henry Vivian	Liberal
1886	Sir Henry Vivian	Liberal Unionist
1887	Sir Henry Vivian	Liberal
1893	William Williams	Liberal
1895	Sir David Brynmor Jones	Liberal
1915	Thomas Jeremiah Williams	Liberal
1918	constituency abolished	

== Electoral history ==
=== Elections in the 1830s ===
General election 1832: Swansea District
Party	Candidate	Votes	%	±%
Whig	John Henry Vivian	Unopposed		
Registered electors		1,307		
Whig win (new seat)				

General election 1835: Swansea District
Party	Candidate	Votes	%	±%
Whig	John Henry Vivian	Unopposed		
Registered electors		1,303		
Whig hold				

General election 1837: Swansea District
Party	Candidate	Votes	%	±%
Whig	John Henry Vivian	Unopposed		
Registered electors		1,349		
Whig hold				

=== Elections in the 1840s ===
General election 1841: Swansea District
Party	Candidate	Votes	%	±%
Whig	John Henry Vivian	Unopposed		
Registered electors		1,287		
Whig hold				

General election 1847: Swansea District
Party	Candidate	Votes	%	±%
Whig	John Henry Vivian	Unopposed		
Registered electors		1,563		
Whig hold				

=== Elections in the 1850s ===
General election 1852: Swansea District
Party	Candidate	Votes	%	±%
Whig	John Henry Vivian	Unopposed		
Registered electors		1,694		
Whig hold				

Vivian's death caused a by-election.

By-election, 27 February 1855: Swansea District
Party	Candidate	Votes	%	±%
Whig	Lewis Llewelyn Dillwyn	Unopposed		
Whig hold				

General election 1857: Swansea District
Party	Candidate	Votes	%	±%
Whig	Lewis Llewelyn Dillwyn	Unopposed		
Registered electors		1,901		
Whig hold				

General election 1859: Swansea District
Party	Candidate	Votes	%	±%
Liberal	Lewis Llewelyn Dillwyn	Unopposed		
Registered electors		1,921		
Liberal hold				

=== Elections in the 1860s ===
General election 1865: Swansea District
Party	Candidate	Votes	%	±%
Liberal	Lewis Llewelyn Dillwyn	Unopposed		
Registered electors		1,967		
Liberal hold				

General election 1868: Swansea District
Party	Candidate	Votes	%	±%
Liberal	Lewis Llewelyn Dillwyn	Unopposed		
Registered electors		7,543		
Liberal hold				

=== Elections in the 1870s ===
General election 1874: Swansea District
Party	Candidate	Votes	%	±%
Liberal	Lewis Llewelyn Dillwyn	5,215	65.8	N/A
Conservative	Charles Bath	2,708	34.2	New
Majority		2,507	31.6	N/A
Turnout		7,923	63.5	N/A
Registered electors		12,476		
Liberal hold				

=== Elections in the 1880s ===
General election 1880: Swansea District
Party	Candidate	Votes	%	±%
Liberal	Lewis Llewelyn Dillwyn	Unopposed		
Registered electors		13,631		
Liberal hold				

General election 1885: Swansea District
Party	Candidate	Votes	%	±%
Liberal	Henry Vivian	Unopposed		
Liberal hold				

In 1886, Vivian briefly joined the Liberal Unionists but was nevertheless returned unopposed and returned to the Gladstonian fold soon after the election.

General election 1886: Swansea District
Party	Candidate	Votes	%	±%
Liberal Unionist	Henry Vivian	Unopposed		
Liberal Unionist gain from Liberal				

=== Elections in the 1890s ===
General election 1892: Swansea District
Party	Candidate	Votes	%	±%
Liberal	Henry Vivian	5,959	86.5	N/A
Conservative	Herbert Monger	933	13.5	N/A
Majority		5,026	73.0	N/A
Turnout		6,892	68.6	N/A
Registered electors		10,047		
Liberal hold		Swing	N/A	

In 1893, when he was elevated to the peerage becoming Lord Swansea, he was succeeded by the Morriston tinplate owner, William Williams.

By-election, 19 Jun 1893: Swansea District
Party	Candidate	Votes	%	±%
Liberal	William Williams	Unopposed		
Liberal hold				

Williams served for only two years before being replaced in 1895 by Brynmor Jones. Jones had strong nonconformist connections but his political career was undistinguished and he concentrated on his legal career.

General election 1895: Swansea District
Party	Candidate	Votes	%	±%
Liberal	Brynmor Jones	3,850	49.9	−36.6
Independent Liberal-Labour	Ernest Hall Hedley	2,018	26.1	New
Conservative	John Wright	1,851	24.0	+10.5
Majority		1,832	23.8	−49.2
Turnout		7,719	75.4	+6.8
Registered electors		10,237		
Liberal hold		Swing	−23.6	

=== Elections in the 1900s ===
Jones

General election 1900: Swansea District
Party	Candidate	Votes	%	±%
Liberal	Brynmor Jones	Unopposed		
Liberal hold				

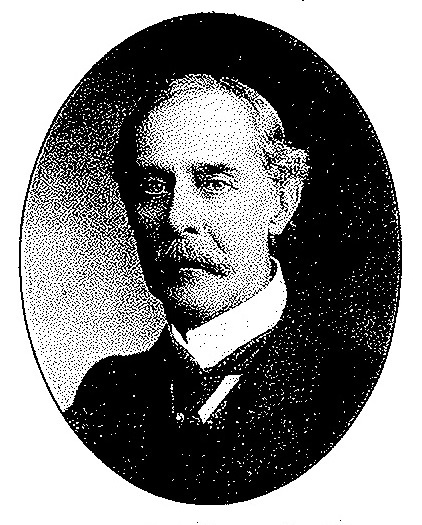
Jones

General election 1906: Swansea District
Party	Candidate	Votes	%	±%
Liberal	Brynmor Jones	Unopposed		
Liberal hold				

=== Elections in the 1910s ===
General election January 1910: Swansea District
Party	Candidate	Votes	%	±%
Liberal	Brynmor Jones	8,488	77.9	N/A
Conservative	Robert Campbell	2,415	22.1	New
Majority		6,073	55.8	N/A
Turnout		10,903	84.0	N/A
Registered electors		12,983		
Liberal hold		Swing	N/A	

1910 Swansea District by-election
Party	Candidate	Votes	%	±%
Liberal	Brynmor Jones	Unopposed		
Liberal hold				

General election December 1910: Swansea District
Party	Candidate	Votes	%	±%
Liberal	Brynmor Jones	Unopposed		
Liberal hold				

1914 Swansea District by-election
Party	Candidate	Votes	%	±%
Liberal	Brynmor Jones	Unopposed		
Liberal hold				

Williams

1915 Swansea District by-election
Party	Candidate	Votes	%	±%
Liberal	Thomas Williams	Unopposed		
Liberal hold				
