= Bert Pearce =

Welsh communist activist (1919–2002)

Herbert Pearce (6 January 1919 – 21 August 2002), commonly known as Bert Pearce, was a Welsh communist activist and political candidate.

Born in Pembroke Dock, Pearce was educated at the Pembroke Dock County School. In 1936 he followed his parents' example by becoming a member of the Labour Party; he was working at the time as a clerk in the local labour exchange. By 1938 he had moved to Handsworth, Birmingham and joined the Communist Party of Great Britain (CPGB). Starting in 1941, he was a full-time Party official. In 1946 he married fellow Welsh communist Margaret Forbister. They had a son and daughter.

Pearce was a steadfast trade unionist. He had been active in the Clerical and Administrative Workers Union, served on the Birmingham Trades Council, and later joined the Union of Shop, Distributive and Allied Workers when he worked in a South Wales bookshop. He campaigned for Welsh devolution, and was an advocate for a Welsh Trades Union Congress.

Over the decades, Pearce filled diverse roles in the CPGB. From 1953 to 1960, he was Secretary of the Birmingham City area. He then became Secretary of the Welsh District, remaining in that post until 1984. He was on the editorial board of the Party's theoretical magazine Marxism Today, and he was a member of the CPGB's Executive Committee. Following the 1968 Prague Spring and the Warsaw Pact invasion of Czechoslovakia, he began to be critical of the Soviet Union.

Pearce stood in multiple elections as a Communist MP candidate, including the 1955 and 1959 general elections in Birmingham Perry Barr, the 1963 Swansea East by-election, and the 1970 general election for the Neath constituency. He also stood in the 1968 South Cardiff ward election, and four times in municipal elections in Birmingham.

The CPGB dissolved in 1991, and Pearce backed its successor, Democratic Left. He devoted much of the 1990s to caring for his ailing wife Margaret. In 1998 when Nelson Mandela gave a speech in Cardiff, he thanked Pearce for his support during the anti-apartheid movement.

On 21 August 2002, Bert Pearce died in Cardiff. He was 83.

Party political offices
Preceded by Bill Alexander	Secretary of the Welsh District of the Communist Party of Great Britain; 1960–1984	Succeeded by Dave Richards
