= Glyn Davies (economist) =

British economist

Glyn Davies (22 May 1919 – 6 January 2003) was a Welsh economist, best known for his 1994 book, A History Of Money From Ancient Times To The Present Day.

== Education and career ==
Davies was educated at Llandrindod Wells and Tonypandy, and studied economics at University of Wales, Cardiff. His studies were interrupted by the outbreak of World War II; he served in the Royal Dragoons and was present at the Battle of El Alamein. He also took part in the Normandy invasions of 1944.

After the war, Davies became a primary school teacher before completing his degree in economics and going on to postgraduate study.

Davies lectured at the University of Strathclyde and became an advisor to George Thomas, Viscount Tonypandy, when the latter was Secretary of State for Wales. In 1970 he became the first Sir Julian Hodge Professor of Banking and Finance at UWIST, Cardiff, a post he held until his retirement in 1985.

== Personal ==
Davies was born in Aberbeegnear Abertillery, where his father was a miner.

Davies met his Danish wife Grethe while on active service, and they married in 1947. He and his wife had four children - Roy, John Eric (born 1952), Kenneth, and Lisa Wise.

== Works ==
- National Giro: Modern Money Transfer (1973)
- European Finance For Development (1974)
- Overseas Investment In Wales (1976)
- Building Societies And Their Branches (1981)
- A History Of Money From Ancient Times To The Present Day (1994)
