= Henry Vivian, 1st Baron Swansea =

Welsh industrialist and politician

The Right Honourable The Lord Swansea
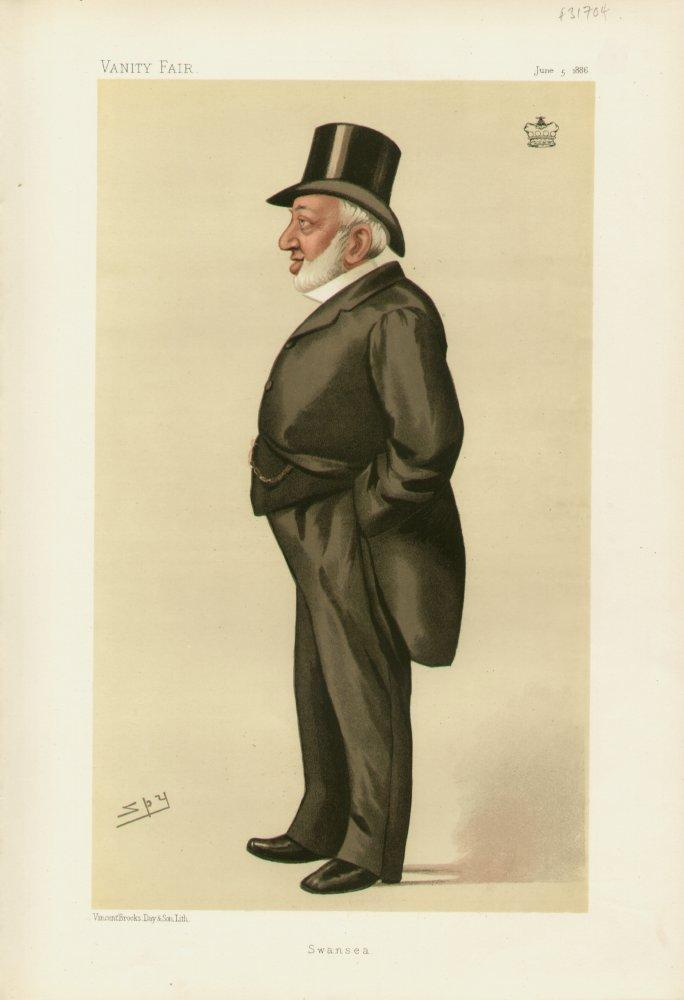
- "Swansea". Caricature by "Spy" (Leslie Ward) published in Vanity Fair in 1886.

Member of the House of Lords
- Lord Temporal
- In office 9 June 1893 – 28 November 1894
- Preceded by: Peerage created
- Succeeded by: The 2nd Baron Swansea

Member of Parliament for Swansea District
- In office 1885–1893
- Preceded by: Lewis Llewelyn Dillwyn
- Succeeded by: William Williams

Member of Parliament for Glamorganshire
- In office 1857–1885
- Preceded by: Christopher Rice Mansel Talbot
- Succeeded by: Constituency abolished

Member of Parliament for Truro
- In office 1852–1857
- Preceded by: Humphrey Willyams
- Succeeded by: Edward Brydges Willyams

Personal details
- Born: Henry Hussey Vivian; 6 July 1821 Swansea, Wales
- Died: 28 November 1894 (aged 73) Swansea, Wales
- Party: Whig; Liberal; Liberal Unionist
- Spouses: Jessie Dalrymple Goddard (m. 1847; died 1848) Lady Flora Caroline Elizabeth Cholmeley (m. 1853; died 1868) Averil Beaumont (m. 1870)
- Children: 9
- Parent(s): John Henry Vivian; Sarah Jones

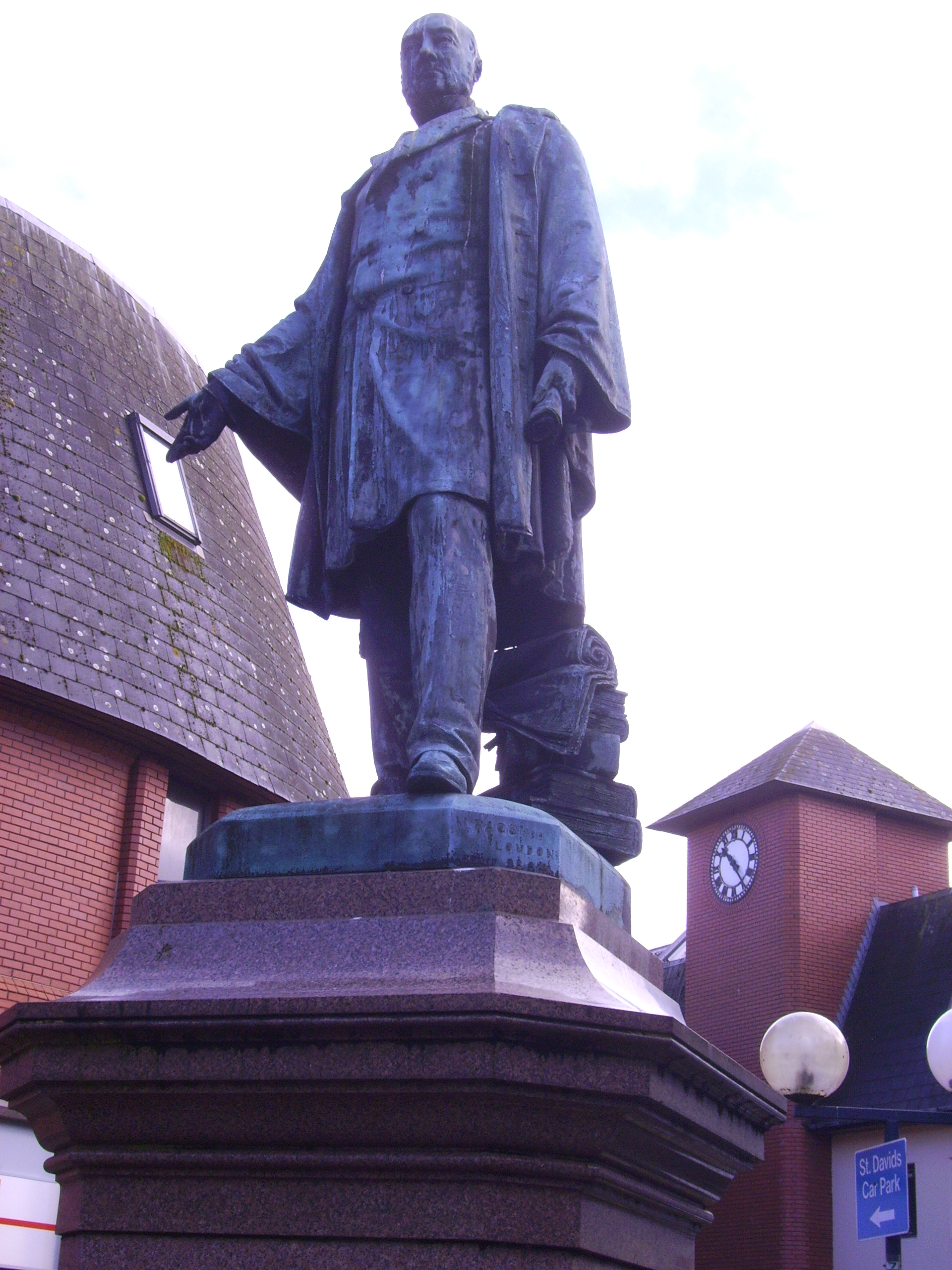
Statue of The 1st Baron Swansea in Swansea.

Henry Hussey Vivian, 1st Baron Swansea (6 July 1821 – 28 November 1894), known between May 1882 and June 1893 as Sir Hussey Vivian, 1st Baronet, was a Welsh industrialist and politician from the Vivian family.

== Biography ==
Born at Singleton Abbey, Swansea, Henry was the eldest son of industrialist and MP John Henry Vivian and his wife Sarah, daughter of Arthur Jones, of Reigate. His younger brothers were Arthur Vivian (who would become an industrialist and MP), Glynn Vivian (afterwards an art collector and philanthropist) and Graham Vivian. His uncle was Richard Hussey Vivian, first baron Vivian. He was educated at Eton and studied metallurgy in Germany and France from 1838 before entering Trinity College, Cambridge, in 1839.

After two years he became manager of the Liverpool branch of the copper-smelting business founded by his grandfather, Vivian & Sons. Three years later he became a partner of the firm before coming to Swansea to manage the Hafod Works during the last ten years of his father's life (1845–1855). He developed a range of by-products from copper-smelting and diversified into other metallurgical activities. He is credited with originating the "sliding scale" of miners' wages after the strike of 1889, though other authorities attribute the idea to William Thomas Lewis, afterwards Lord Merthyr. He was one of the chief promoters of the Rhondda and Swansea Bay Railway, helped to further extend the harbour facilities of the town and championed the merits of Welsh coal in Parliamentary debates. It was largely due to his efforts that Swansea became a major industrial centre.

He served as a Member of Parliament (MP) for Truro (1852–57), Glamorganshire (1857–1885), and Swansea District, 1885–1893.

In 1889, he became the first chairman of the Glamorgan County Council. He was also a Justice of the Peace, Deputy Lieutenant for Glamorgan and for some years first Lieutenant-Colonel of the 4th Glamorgan Rifle Volunteers.

He was created a baronet of Singleton, in the Parish of Swansea in the County of Glamorgan, on 13 May 1882, and Baron Swansea, of Singleton in the County of Glamorgan, on 9 June 1893.

After his death on 28 November 1894, probate was granted to his sons Henry Hussey Vivian and Odo Richard Vivian valuing his estate at £163,707 1s 9d, he was buried in the churchyard of St Paul's Church in Sketty. There is a bronze statue of Henry wearing a frock coat and gown in St. David's Shopping Centre, Swansea, created by Italian sculptor Mario Raggi. There is also a plaque at St John's Church in Hafod. It was erected by his widow and contains the words 'Life's race well run. Life's work well done. Life's crown well won. Then comes rest'.

Lord Swansea's younger brother Sir Arthur Vivian was also a Liberal politician.

== Marriages and children ==
Lord Swansea married, on 15 April 1847, to Jessie Dalrymple Goddard (c. 1825 – 28 February 1848), the daughter of Ambrose Goddard, of the Lawn, Swindon. His wife died of childbed fever a few weeks after the birth of their only child.

- Ernest Ambrose Vivian, 2nd Baron Swansea (11 February 1848 – 17 July 1922); died unmarried

On 14 July 1853, he married Lady Flora Caroline Elizabeth Cholmeley (died 25 January 1868), daughter of Sir Montague Cholmeley, 2nd Baronet. They had one son;

- The Hon. John Aubrey Vivian (23 July 1854 – 1 March 1898); died unmarried

Lord Swansea took as his third wife, on 10 November 1870, Averil Beaumont (1841 – 14 January 1934), daughter of Capt. Richard Beaumont, R.N., and granddaughter of the 3rd Baron Macdonald of Slate. He and his third wife had seven children;

- Violet Averil Margaret Vivian (3 December 1871 – 30 March 1943)
- Henry Hussey Vivian (5 February 1873 – 11 December 1898); died unmarried
- Odo Richard Vivian, 3rd Baron Swansea (22 April 1875 – 16 November 1934)
- Averil Vivian (4 December 1876 – 1 February 1959); married George Tryon, 1st Baron Tryon
- Alexandra Gladys Vivian (c. 1879 – 17 July 1966)
- Alberta Diana Vivian (10 February 1883 – 1968)
- a daughter (10 February 1883)

== Arms ==
Coat of arms of Henry Vivian, 1st Baron Swansea
Crest 1st: a Lion's Head erased proper charged with two Bezants palewise and gorged with a Collar Gules thereon three Annulets Or with a Chain of the last; 2nd: issuant from a Bridge of one arch embattled and having at each end a Tower proper a Demi-Hussar in the uniform of the 18th Regiment holding in his right hand a Sabre and in his left a Red Pennon flying to the sinister Escutcheon Or on a Chevron Azure between three Lions' Heads erased proper as many Annulets Gold on a Chief embattled Gules a Wreath of Oak Or between two Martlets Argent Supporters Dexter: A Dragon wings elevated Gules gorged with a Collar Or charged with three Torteaux; Sinister: A Horse Argent Saddle and Bridle proper Trappings Gules gorged with a Collar Sable charged with three Bezants Motto Vive Anima Dei (Live by the spirit of God)

Parliament of the United Kingdom
Preceded by John Ennis Vivian; Humphrey Willyams	Member of Parliament for Truro; 1852–1857; With: John Ennis Vivian	Succeeded by Augustus Smith; Edward Brydges Willyams
Preceded by Christopher Rice Mansel Talbot; Sir George Tyler	Member of Parliament for Glamorganshire; 1857–1885; With: Christopher Rice Mansel Talbot	Constituency abolished
Preceded by Lewis Llewelyn Dillwyn	Member of Parliament for Swansea District; 1885–1893	Succeeded by William Williams
Peerage of the United Kingdom
New creation	Baron Swansea; 1893–1894; Member of the House of Lords (1893–1894)	Succeeded by Ernest Vivian
Baronetage of the United Kingdom
New creation	Baronet of Singleton; 1882–1894	Succeeded by Ernest Vivian
