= Jeremiah Williams (British politician) =

Welsh barrister and Liberal politician (1872–1919)

Thomas Jeremiah Williams

Thomas Jeremiah Williams (1872 – 12 June 1919) was a Welsh barrister and Liberal politician.

== Family and Education ==
Thomas Jeremiah Williams was the eldest son of William Williams who was a Liberal Member of Parliament for the Swansea District from 1893 to 1895. He was educated at University College School, London, Sheffield Technical College and Firth College. In 1912, he married Laura Alice Marlow of Southport. They had one daughter Gwenith Alice Thomas (née Williams, (1913–2008)).

== Career ==
Williams was involved in technical and commercial training. He was director of a number of companies, principally in the tinplate industry but also with interests in the colliery and railway sectors. He qualified for the law, practising at the Bar on the South Wales and Chester Circuit.

== Politics ==
Williams first stood for Parliament at the 1906 general election as a Liberal candidate in the Gower constituency in West Glamorgan. Although Gower had been a Liberal seat and 1906 was a landslide election year for the Liberals, Williams was beaten by 299 votes by an Independent Liberal candidate John Williams in a three-cornered contest with the Unionist, E Holme, in third place.

Williams did not contest a seat at either of the general elections of 1910 but was adopted for his father's old seat of Swansea District for a by-election there on 6 February 1915 when the sitting MP, David Brynmor Jones was appointed a judge. He held the seat for the Coalition. Swansea District constituency was abolished in 1918, but Williams was adopted as Coalition Liberal candidate for the new Swansea East seat at the 1918 general election. He won the seat in a straight fight with Labour candidate David Williams.

== Death ==
Williams died on 12 June 1919 at the young age of 47 years after a long illness from colitis at his home in Maesygwernen Hall near Swansea. He is buried in Oystermouth Cemetery in Mumbles, alongside his wife Laura Alice Williams and close to the grave of his father William Williams.

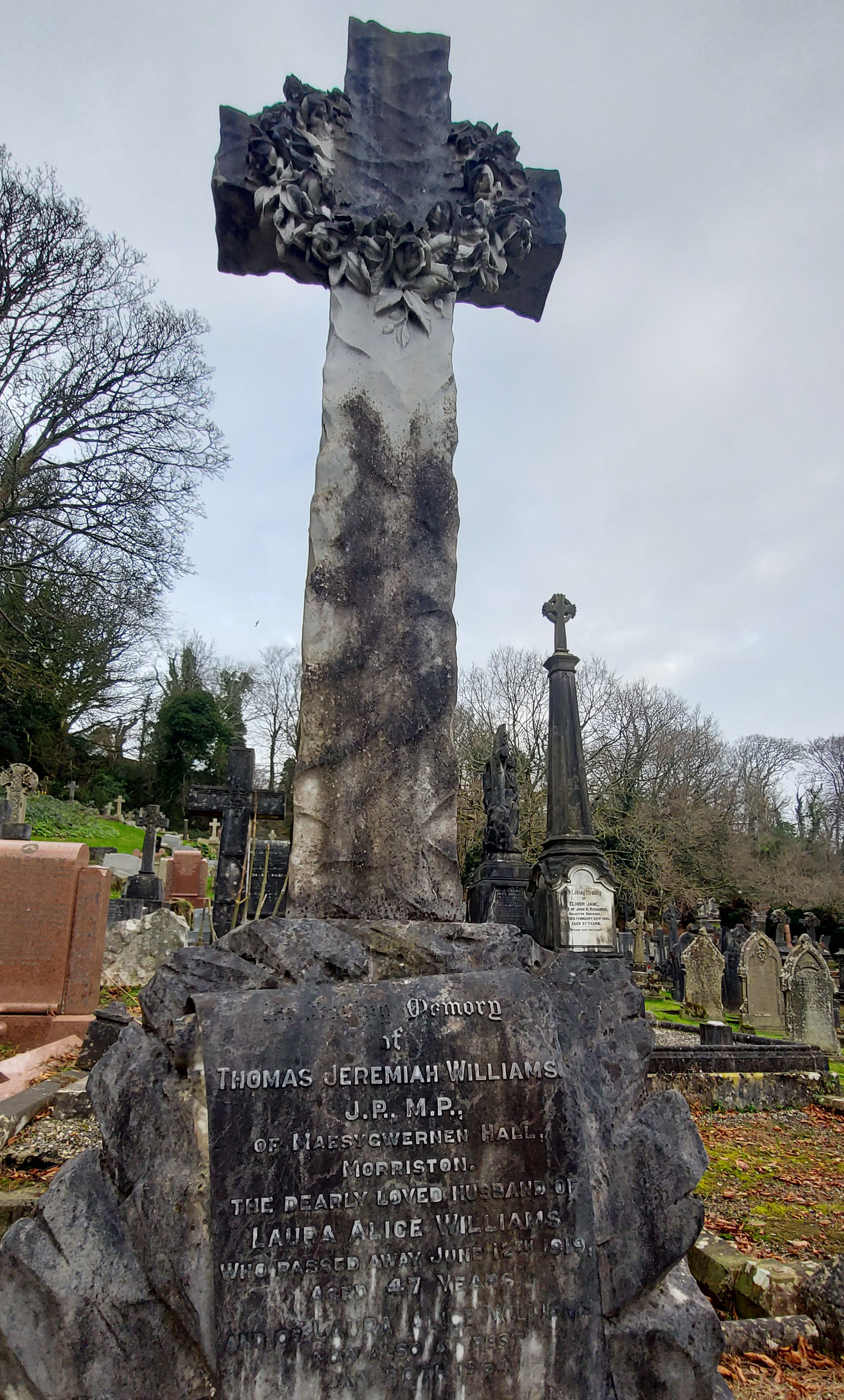
Grave of (Thomas) Jeremiah Williams and Laura Ann Williams in Oystermouth Cemetery, Mumbles, Swansea, UK.

In the by-election which his death caused, his seat was held for the Coalition Liberals by David Matthews.

Parliament of the United Kingdom
Preceded by Sir David Brynmor Jones	Member of Parliament for Swansea District; 1915 – 1918	Constituency abolished
New constituency	Member of Parliament for Swansea East; 1918 – 1919	Succeeded by David Matthews
