= Coalition Liberal =

- Leader: David Lloyd George
- Founded: 6 December 1916
- Dissolved: 19 January 1922
- Split from: Liberal
- Merged into: National Liberal
- Ideology: British nationalism New liberalism Free trade
- Political position: Centre

Coalition Liberals sometimes referred to as the Coalition Liberal Party was a political group that split from the Liberal Party following the replacement of H. H. Asquith as Prime Minister of the United Kingdom by David Lloyd George in December 1916.

== History ==
=== The Liberal Split ===
After leading a Liberal Minority government since January 1910 general election, by May 1915, with his conduct of the First World War facing heavy criticism (particularly the ongoing Gallipoli campaign and the Shell Crisis), Liberal leader H. H. Asquith felt forced to form a coalition government with the Conservatives and Labour.

Despite retaining the most important roles in the government, many Liberals were dismayed with the situation, with Charles Hobhouse writing, "The disintegration of the Liberal Party is complete. Ll.G. and his Tory friends will soon get rid of Asquith." While historian John Grigg would describe this coalition as a "notable victory for (Asquith), if not for the allied cause", nevertheless Asquith's attitude towards Tory leader Bonar Law would contribute to his eventual downfall.

By November 1916, relations between Asquith and the Conservative ministers had become so strained, that after negotiations with Law, Opposition Leader Edward Carson and Secretary of State for War David Lloyd George to form a smaller "War Council" failed to reach an agreement, and with Law and Lloyd George threatening to resign, Asquith tendered his resignation to the King on 5 December. The following day, with Law lacking any Liberal support, Lloyd George was invited to form a Government.

Asquith still controlled the party machinery and on 8 December a gathering of Liberal MPs gave Asquith a vote of confidence as Leader of the Liberal Party, followed unanimously a few days later by the executive of the National Liberal Federation. Most Liberal parliamentarians remained loyal to him, and as such most senior Liberals left the government to sit on the opposition benches.

While those supporting Lloyd George were still technically members of the Liberal Party, as the time progressed they began to be increasingly referred to as Coalition Liberals to distinguish them from the opposition Liberals led by Asquith.

=== 1918 election ===
In the dying days of the War, Lloyd George and Law decided to continue the coalition after the end of the war. Confidential negotiations between Coalition Liberal Chief Whip, Freddie Guest, and George Younger, Chairman of the Conservative Party, over the summer of 1918, led to 150 Liberals being offered the support of the Prime Minister and the Leader of the Conservative Party at the next general election. The two leaders agreed to issue a letter to a single government supporter in most constituencies for the 1918 general election, which thus became known as the 'coupon election'. Not all loyal MPs got the coupon and some who were offered it rejected the support.

Three days after the Armistice of 11 November 1918 ended hostilities, it was announced that Parliament, which had been sitting since December 1910, would dissolve on 25 November, with a general election set for 14 December.

The coalition would win the general election in a landside, winning 521 out of the 707 seats, however the Conservatives won more than double the number won by the Coalition Liberals. The non coalition Liberals (who had used the label "Independent Liberal" at the election) suffered a catastrophic defeat, with only 36 MPs elected and Asquith himself losing his seat.

=== National Liberals ===
With any reconciliation with the main Liberal Party growing increasingly less likely as time went on and needing a party infrastructure to fight future elections, Lloyd George came to believe he need to formalize the Coalition Liberals into a new party. A meeting was held in London on 18–19 January 1922 and a new National Liberal Party was formed, with Lloyd George as leader and Secretary of State for the Colonies Winston Churchill as deputy.

== Electoral performance ==
=== National vote ===
Parliament of the United Kingdom
Election	Leader	Votes			Seats			Government
Election	Leader	No.	%	Position	No.	±	Position	Government
1918	David Lloyd George	1,396,590	12.6	▲4th	128 / 707	▲28	2nd	Coalition Liberals–Conservative

1918 Results By Constituency

=== Welsh results ===
The results in the county and borough constituencies in Wales.

Constituency	Candidate	Votes	(%)	Position
Aberavon	John Edwards	13,635	62.8	1
Anglesey	Ellis Ellis-Griffith	8,898	49.6	2
Bedwellty	William Henry Williams	10,170	46.4	2
Brecon and Radnorshire	Sidney Robinson	Unopposed		1
Caernarvon Boroughs	David Lloyd George	13,993	92.7	1
Caernarvonshire	Charles Breese	10,488	44.5	1
Cardiganshire	Matthew Vaughan-Davies	Unopposed		1
Carmarthen	John Hinds	Unopposed		1
Denbigh	David Davies	14,773	83.3	1
Flintshire	Tom Parry	Unopposed		1
Llanelly	Towyn Jones	16,344	53.1	1
Merthyr	Edgar Jones	14,127	52.7	1
Neath	Hugh Edwards	17,818	64.8	1
Newport	Lewis Haslam	14,080	56.4	1
Pembrokeshire	Evan Davies Jones	19,200	69.8	1
Pontypridd	Thomas Arthur Lewis	13,327	56.1	1
Swansea East	Jeremiah Williams	11,071	63.6	1
Swansea West	Alfred Mond	8,579	40.0	1
Wrexham	Robert Thomas	20,874	76.3	1
Welsh Total	19 Candidates	207,377	39.2	17 MPs

The results in the University of Wales constituency.

Constituency	Candidate	Votes	(%)	Position
University of Wales	Herbert Lewis	739	80.8	1
Total	1 Candidate	739	80.8	1 MP

=== Scotland results ===
The results in the county and borough constituencies in Scotland.

Constituency	Candidate	Votes	(%)	Position
Aberdeen North	Duncan Pirie	5,918	49.1	2
Argyllshire	William Sutherland	11,970	81.4	1
Banffshire	Charles Barrie	Unopposed		1
Berwick and Haddington	John Hope	8,584	53.9	1
Caithness and Sutherland	Leicester Harmsworth	6,769	62.6	1
Dumbarton Burghs	John Taylor	11,734	52.6	1
Dundee	Winston Churchill	25,788	37.5	1
Dunfermline Burghs	John Wallace	6,886	44.6	1
Aberdeen and Kincardine East	Henry Cowan	4,430	50.5	1
East Renfrewshire	Joseph Johnstone	13,107	72.2	1
Edinburgh Central	Joseph Dobbie	6,797	48.7	2
Galloway	Gilbert McMicking	Unopposed		1
Glasgow Bridgeton	MacCallum Scott	10,887	55.2	1
Glasgow Cathcart	John Pratt	16,310	76.9	1
Glasgow Partick	Robert Balfour	12,156	70.2	1
Inverness	Thomas Morison	7,991	73.2	1
Kilmarnock	Alexander Shaw	13,568	73.2	1
Kirkcaldy Burghs	Henry Dalziel	Unopposed		1
Montrose Burghs	John Sturrock	9,309	76.0	1
Moray and Nairn	Archibald Williamson	Unopposed		1
Orkney and Shetland	Cathcart Wason	Unopposed		1
Perth	William Young	Unopposed		1
Ross and Cromarty	Ian Macpherson	8,358	78.9	1
Roxburgh and Selkirk	Robert Munro	13,043	70.1	1
Rutherglen	Adam Keir Rodger	12,641	59.1	1
West Aberdeenshire and Kincardine	Arthur Murray	Unopposed		1
West Renfrewshire	James Greig	11,524	61.8	1
Western Isles	William Cotts	3,375	42.5	2
Scottish Total	28 Candidates	221,145	19.6	25 MPs

The results in the Combined Scottish Universities constituency.

Constituency	Candidate	Votes	(%)	Position
Combined Scottish Universities	Dugald Cowan	3,499	27.0	(1 of 3)
Total	1 Candidate	3,499	27.0	1 MP

== Leadership history ==
=== Leaders of the Coalition Liberals ===
Name (Birth–Death)	Portrait	Constituency	Entered office	Left office
David Lloyd George (1863–1945)		Carnarvon Boroughs	6 December 1916	19 January 1922

=== Chief Whip of the Coalition Liberals ===
Name (Birth–Death)	Portrait	Constituency	Entered office	Left office
Neil Primrose (1882–1917)		Wisbech	14 December 1916	2 March 1917
Freddie Guest (1875–1937)		East Dorset	2 March 1917	1 April 1921
Charles McCurdy (1870–1941)		Northampton	1 April 1921	19 January 1922

== Bibliography ==
- The History of the Liberal Party 1895–1970, by Roy Douglas (Sidgwick & Jackson 1971)
- A Short History of the Liberal Party 1900–92, by Chris Cook (Macmillan Press 1993)
- Hobhouse, Charles (1977). David, Edward (ed.). Inside Asquith's Cabinet: From the Diaries of Charles Hobhouse. London: John Murray. ISBN 978-0-7195-3387-7.
- Grigg, John (1985). Lloyd George: From Peace to War 1912–1916. London: Methuen. ISBN 978-0-413-46660-0.
- Koss, Stephen (1985). Asquith. London: Hamish Hamilton. ISBN 978-0-231-06155-1.
- Leonard, Dick (2005). A Century of Premiers: Salisbury to Blair. Basingstoke: Palgrave Macmillan. ISBN 978-1-4039-3990-6.
- Mowat, Charles Loch (1955). Britain between the wars, 1918–1940. Chicago: University of Chicago Press. pp. 2–9.
