= David Brynmor Jones =

British politician (1851–1921)

Brynmor Jones c.1895

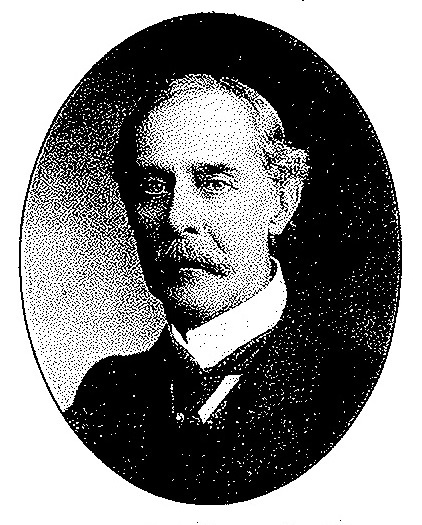
Brynmor Jones c.1906

Sir David Brynmor Jones, KC (probably forenamed Brynmor; originally surnamed Jones, later surnamed Brynmor-Jones; 1851 – 6 August 1921) was a British barrister, judge, historian and Liberal Member of Parliament.

== Life ==
David Brynmor Jones was born in 1851 in Swansea, Glamorgan, United Kingdom, the first of the six children of Thomas Jones, a Congregationalist minister, and Jane Jones. His younger siblings were Annie, John Viriamu Jones (born 1856; afterwards a scientist and educationist), Irvonwy, Leifchild (born 1862; afterwards a Liberal politician and temperance campaigner), and Morlais Glasfryn (afterwards an engineer).

In September 1858, when he was seven years old, his parents moved to London; where he became a pupil at University College School. In 1867, when he was sixteen, his mother died; and in 1869 his father left London for health reasons. Afterwards Jones became a student at University College, London. He was called to the bar in 1876 from the Middle Temple. In 1885 he became a county court judge.

From 1892 to 1895, he was Member of Parliament for Stroud; during which period he served on the Welsh Land Commission (1893). In 1895, he chose to transfer his candidacy to the safer Liberal seat of Swansea District, where he served as Member of Parliament from 1895 until 1914.. During this period he was knighted (1906), served on the Welsh Church Commission (1907), and, in 1912 was sworn of the Privy Council. He was a Master in Lunacy from 1915 to 1921.

He published several articles on the legal history of Wales. He died on 6 August 1921.

== Family ==
Brynmor Jones married in 1892 Florence Cohen (1857–1920), daughter of Lionel Cohen. Mrs. Brynmor Jones took an active part in the organization and funding of a military field hospital during the Second Boer War, known as The Welsh Hospital.

== Works ==
- The Welsh People (1900; with John Rhys)

Parliament of the United Kingdom
Preceded by George Holloway	Member of Parliament for Stroud; 1892–1895	Succeeded by Charles Cripps
Preceded by William Williams	Member of Parliament for Swansea District; 1895–1914	Succeeded by Thomas Jeremiah Williams
