= St Ives by-election =

St Ives by-election may refer to:

- 1838 St Ives by-election
- 1846 St Ives by-election
- 1874 St Ives by-election
- 1875 St Ives by-election
- 1881 St Ives by-election
- 1887 St Ives by-election
- 1928 St Ives by-election
- 1937 St Ives by-election
