= Henry Paull =

Member of Parliament for St Ives
- In office 27 March 1857 – 15 November 1868
- Preceded by: Robert Laffan
- Succeeded by: Charles Magniac

Personal details
- Born: 1824
- Died: 1898 (aged 74)
- Party: Conservative
- Parent: Archibald Paull

Henry Paull (1824–1898) was a British Conservative Party politician, and barrister.

The son of Archibald Paull of Devonshire Place, Paull entered Middle Temple in 1845, and was appointed Deputy Lieutenant of Middlesex in 1859.

With Liberal-Conservative principles, Paull was elected Conservative MP for St Ives at the 1857 general election and held the seat until 1868 when he stood down.

Parliament of the United Kingdom
| Preceded by Robert Laffan | Member of Parliament for St Ives; 1857–1868 | Succeeded by Charles Magniac |
