= St. John the Evangelist, Bermuda =

Anglican parish church of Pembroke in Bermuda

Coordinates: 32°18′03″N 64°47′11″W

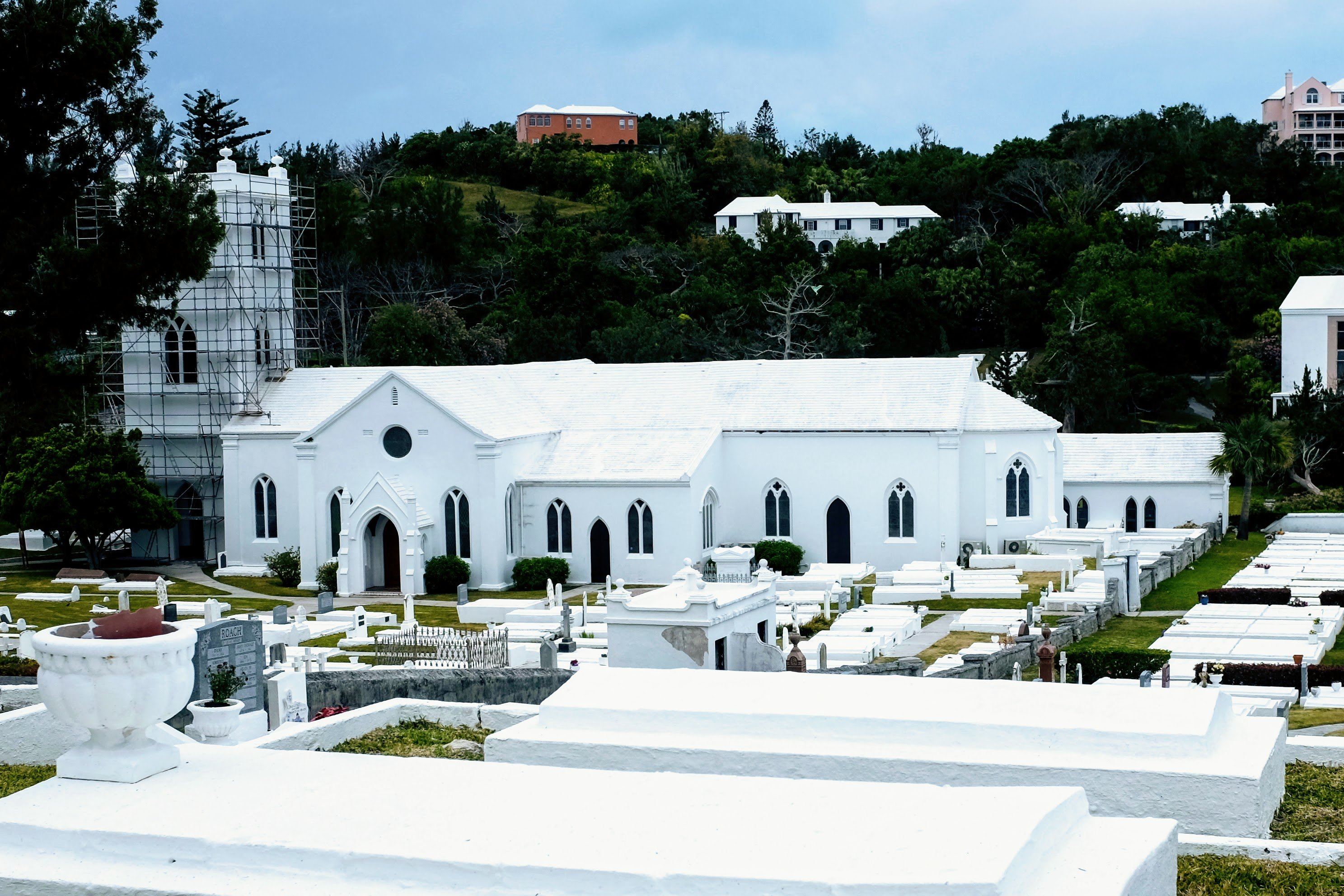
St. John the Evangelist

St. John the Evangelist is the Anglican parish church, located on St John's Road, in the Parish of Pembroke in Bermuda. It was established in the 1620s when it was known as Spanish Point Church, the original name for Pembroke Parish.

== History ==
The construction of the original church began in 1621, with the parish celebrating the 375th anniversary in 1996. It is believed construction finished in 1625, as is commemorated by a carved board behind the church's pulpit. There are marriage records dating back as far as 1647, including the marriage of an unfortunately named woman, Miss Affliction Watkins to Mr Edward Morgan.

The original church was a wooden structure with a thatched roof of palmetto leaves. Rethatching of the roof took place in 1677. It was destroyed by fire after a hurricane and rebuilt in 1721 and again in 1821. Enlargements were then made to the church several times over the years to cope with increasing congregation sizes. Minton floor tiling was added in 1883, but this was done poorly and the floor was later relaid in 1896. When a new apse was built, there was an attempt to move this flooring but most of the tiles were broken. The church converted to using electric lighting in 1923. A new organ was added in 1968, and during reconstruction work to the tower, new bells were added in 1970. General restoration work was carried out once more to the building between 1983 and 1984.

The St John's churchyard is known as Pembroke Churchyard or Pembroke Cemetery.

== Leadership ==
The current priest is Revd. Brian Haigh.

== Notable interments ==
- Bishop Edward Feild (1876)
- Robert Laffan, governor of Bermuda. (1882)

== See also ==
- Pembroke Wesleyan Cemetery nearby
