= Cory baronets =

Set index for Cory baronets

There have been two baronetcies created for persons with the surname Cory, both in the Baronetage of the United Kingdom. One creation is extant as of 2026.

- Cory baronets of Llantarnam Abbey (1907): see Clifford Cory (1859–1941)
- Cory baronets of Coryton (1919)
