= Wesleyan Cemetery =

Wesleyan Cemetery may refer to:

- Normanville Wesleyan Cemetery, in Normanville, South Australia
- Pembroke Wesleyan Cemetery, Bermuda
- Wesleyan Cemetery, Cincinnati, a cemetery in Cincinnati, Ohio, U.S.
- Wesleyan Cemetery, Walkerville, a cemetery in Walkerville, Adelaide, Australia
