= Catch-all =

A catch-all or catchall is a general term, or metaphoric dumping group, for a variety of similar words or meanings.

Catch-all may also refer to:

- Catch-all party, or big tent party
- Catch-all email filter
- Catch-all taxon, a grouping of organisms not fitting anywhere else
- Catchall, Cornwall, a hamlet in west Cornwall, England, UK
