= Catchall, Cornwall =

Hamlet in Cornwall, England

Coordinates: 50.094°N 5.594°W

Catchall: Cornish: Hendra Woles
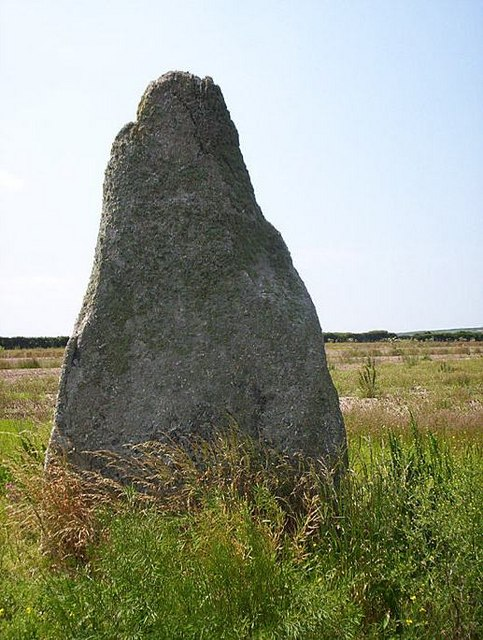
- The Blind Fiddler Standing Stone

- Location within Cornwall
- OS grid reference: SW430279
- Civil parish: Sancreed
- Unitary authority: Cornwall
- Ceremonial county: Cornwall
- Region: South West
- Country: England
- Sovereign state: United Kingdom
- Post town: Penzance
- Postcode district: TR19
- Dialling code: 01736
- Police: Devon and Cornwall
- Fire: Cornwall
- Ambulance: South Western
- UK Parliament: St Ives

Catchall (Cornish: Hendra Woles, meaning lower ancient farm) is a hamlet in the civil parish of Sancreed in west Cornwall, England, UK. Catchall is 1 mile (1.6 km) south-east of Sancreed at around 310 feet (94 m) above sea level at the junction of the B3283 with the A30 main road. Catchall is probably from the name of a 19th-century public house which at that time was an important road junction.

There are a number of prehistoric standing stones nearby that have been scheduled as ancient monuments by English Heritage; the Blind Fiddler, the Long Stones and Tresvennack Pillar are all within 1 mile (1.6 km) of Catchall. The Blind Fiddler is a single freestanding monolith measuring 3.3 by 1.9 by 0.4 metres (10.8 by 6.2 by 1.3 ft). The Long Stones (also known as the "Sisters" or "Triganeeris Stones") are two upright monoliths standing approximately 5.5 metres (18 ft) apart. Both stones are over 2 metres (6 ft 7 in) high. Excavations revealed that between the two stones is a rectangular pit. The Tresvennack Pillar is a single upright monolith with a large vertical crack and standing almost 4m high.

The freehold tenement of Catchall, then being part of Hendra was sold by public auction on 23 June 1883. At the time of selling it was occupied by Mr William Jacka, on a yearly tenancy and included 3–4 acres (1.2–1.6 ha) for cultivation, a farmhouse, barn, stable two pig-houses, cart shed, etc. The tenement was purchased by Thomas Bedford Bolitho, a local banker and industrialist, who owned nearby Kerris.

A dairy opened on 24 May 1889 for the production of butter using DeLaval machinery from Denmark.
