= Baron St Levan =

Barony in the Peerage of the United Kingdom

Barony St Levan
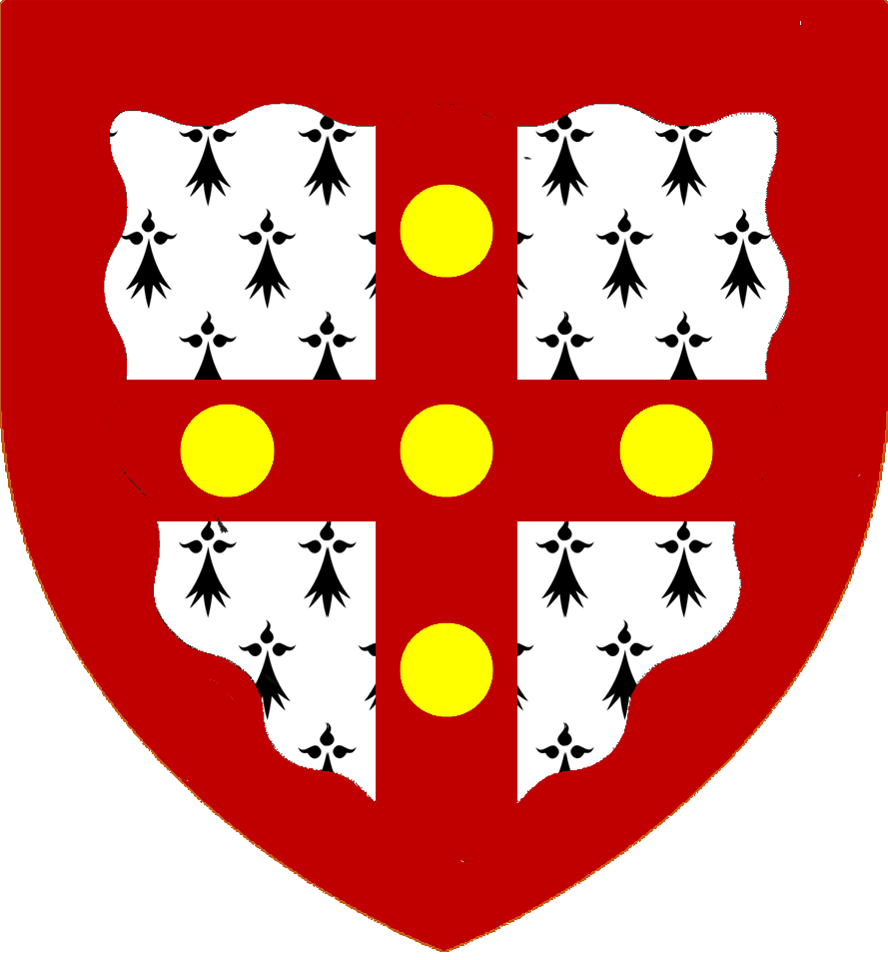
- Blazon Arms: Ermine on a Cross Gules five Bezants all within a Bordure wavy of the second. Crest: A Rock proper therefrom a Cornish Chough rising Sable the whole debruised with a Bendlet sinister wavy Ermine. Supporters: On either side a Lion Or gorged with a Chain proper and pendant therefrom an Escutcheon, that of the dexter per fess Azure and Argent in chief a Naval Crown between two Laurel Branches saltirewise Or in base the Frame of a Vessel proper, that of the sinister Sable charged with five Bezants.
- Creation date: 4 July 1887
- Created by: Queen Victoria
- Peerage: Peerage of the United Kingdom
- First holder: John St Aubyn
- Present holder: James St Aubyn
- Heir apparent: Hon. Hugh James St Aubyn
- Remainder to: the 1st Baron's heirs male whatsoever
- Status: Extant
- Motto: In Se Teres (Exact in himself)

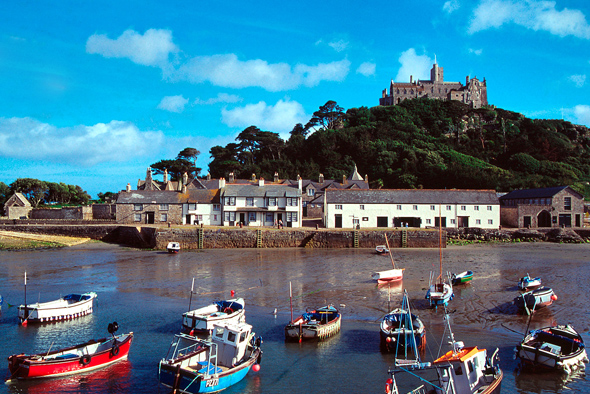
St. Michael's Mount

Baron St Levan, of St Michael's Mount in the County of Cornwall, is a title in the Peerage of the United Kingdom. It was created on 4 July 1887 for the former Member of Parliament Sir John St Aubyn, 2nd Baronet, becoming John St Aubyn, 1st Baron St Levan. He had previously represented Cornwall West in House of Commons as a Liberal and St Ives as a Liberal Unionist. He was succeeded by his eldest son, the second Baron, who was a Colonel and Honorary Brigadier-General in the Grenadier Guards. On his death the titles passed to his nephew, the third Baron, the son of the Hon. Sir Arthur James Dudley Stuart St Aubyn (1867–1897), second son of the first Baron. The third baron was succeeded in 1978 by his eldest son, the fourth baron, who had served with the Royal Navy at Dunkirk and in a minesweeper in Arctic Convoys during World War II and was awarded the Distinguished Service Cross (DSC). As of 2014, the titles are held by the fourth Baron's nephew, the fifth Baron, who succeeded in 2013.

The St Aubyn Baronetcy, of St Michael's Mount in the County of Cornwall, was created in the Baronetage of the United Kingdom in 1866 for the first Baron's father, Edward St Aubyn. He was the illegitimate son of Sir John St Aubyn, 5th Baronet, of Clowance, on whose death in 1839 the St Aubyn baronetcy of Clowance, created in the Baronetage of England in 1671, had become extinct (see St Aubyn Baronets).

The family seat is St Michael's Mount, Cornwall.

== St Aubyn Baronets, of St Michaels Mount (1866) ==
- Sir Edward St Aubyn, 1st Baronet (1799–1872)
- Sir John St Aubyn, 2nd Baronet (elevated to the peerage as the 1st Baron St Levan, created in 1887)

== Barons St Levan (1887) ==
- John St Aubyn, 1st Baron St Levan (1829–1908)
- John Townshend St Aubyn, 2nd Baron St Levan (1857–1940)
- Francis Cecil St Aubyn, 3rd Baron St Levan (1895–1978)
- John Francis Arthur St Aubyn, 4th Baron St Levan, DSC (1919–2013)
- James Piers Southwell St Aubyn, 5th Baron St Levan (born 1950)

The heir apparent is the present holder's son Hon. Hugh James St Aubyn (born 1983).

== See also ==
- St Aubyn Baronets, of Clowance
