= Kerris =

Coordinates: 50.08982°N 5.5759°W

Kerris: Cornish: Kerys
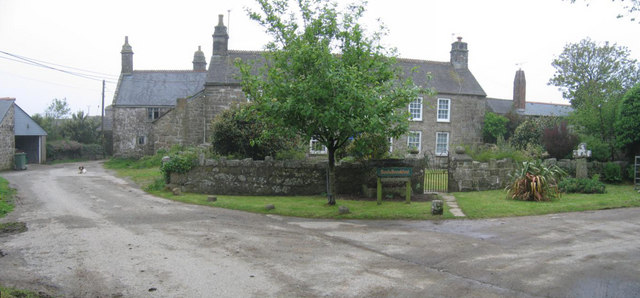
- Kerris Manor Farmhouse

- Location within Cornwall
- OS grid reference: SW443273
- Civil parish: Paul
- Unitary authority: Cornwall
- Ceremonial county: Cornwall
- Region: South West
- Country: England
- Sovereign state: United Kingdom
- Post town: PENZANCE
- Postcode district: TR19
- Dialling code: 01736
- Police: Devon and Cornwall
- Fire: Cornwall
- Ambulance: South Western
- UK Parliament: St Ives

Kerris (Cornish: Kerys) is a settlement in west Cornwall, England, United Kingdom. It is three miles (5 km) south-west of Penzance in the civil parish of Paul. Kerris means "fort-place" in the Cornish language.

== Toponymy ==
In 1302 a document spells the name Veor Keris and other spellings have been Kerres (in 1310), Kyrrys (1337), Vean Kerrys (1440), Keres (1481), Kyrris (1668). (Veor means large or great and Vean means little).

== Antiquities ==
Several prehistoric relics can be found around Kerris including the Roundago (possibly an Iron Age hill fort) and the Kerris Standing Stone or menhir. Several fields away is the Tresvannack Stone which stands around 3.5m tall with a further 1.2m below ground. In 1840 a pair of urns were found under a slab of granite at the base of the stone. The urns are now kept at Penlee Museum, Penzance. Kerris cross was damaged during the English Civil War and repaired by a local blacksmith in the 19th century with iron pins holding the granite head in position. In September 2011 the corroded pins were replaced by stainless steel pins. Medieval crosses, in situ, indicate the route to the parish church.

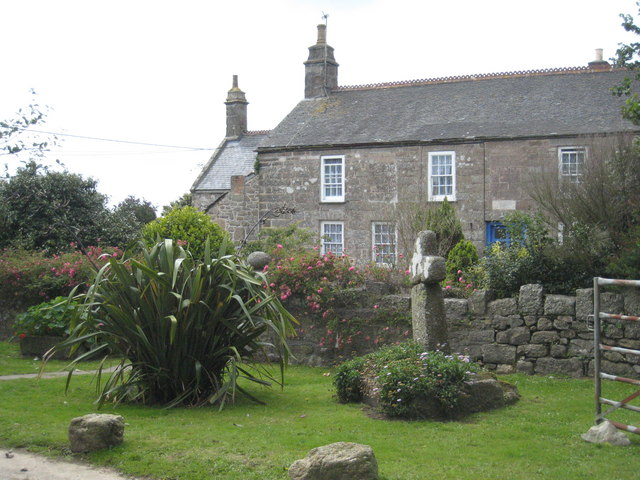
Cross and former manor house

== History ==
There is a former manor house, which is a grade II* listed building dating back to the 17th-century, possibly using earlier walls. Kerris was under three different ownerships until 1694. when Richard Pearce bought the three parts, Major alterations were carried out in 1721 by his son Richard Pearce (1693–1753) and in 1743 John Hawkins became the owner when Pearce and his wife, Maria, were declared bankrupt.

In 1882 the freehold farm Kerris was advertised for sale by auction. It included a ″commodieus and substantially built farm house″ and about 80 acres (32 ha) of land. Approximately 65 acres (26 ha) was considered to be of good arable and pasture land, and 15 acres (6.1 ha) of croft which ″with very little expense could be brought into cultivation″. The property was bought by the owner of an adjacent tenement, Mr Thomas Bedford Bolitho, for £4,320.

A Weselyan chapel was opened in 1905.

== Culture ==
Kerris Brass Band was in attendance at Sheffield's Methodist New Connexion, annual Sunday school treat in June 1883.

== Sources ==
- Historic England, "Kerris Manor Farmhouse (1327506)", National Heritage List for England
