= Charles Magniac =

British politician (1827–1891)

Charles Magniac (1827 – 23 November 1891) was a British financier and Liberal politician who sat in the House of Commons in two periods between 1868 and 1886.

Magniac was the eldest son of Hollingworth Magniac of Colworth, Bedfordshire. Following education at Eton College and the University of Cambridge, he worked in finance in the City of London, becoming a partner in Matheson and Company of Lombard Street. He was appointed a deputy lieutenant for the city, and was the first president of the London Chamber of Commerce. In about 1869 Magniac purchased Chesterfield House the great Mayfair townhouse built 1747–52 by Philip Stanhope, 4th Earl of Chesterfield, which had been threatened with demolition.

== Political career ==
Magniac was a committed Liberal, and was elected as a member of parliament for the party on a number of occasions. He was first elected as an MP in 1868, representing St Ives, Cornwall. A contemporary political reporter commented:

"St Ives, (Cornwall) scared away Mr Paull (C), and embraced Mr. Magniac (L), of the firm of Matheson & Co., the frightfully rich China merchants in the City, who when they lose a quarter of a million [pounds] are no more concerned about it than I should be if I were to lose half a crown."

He held the St Ives seat until 1874 then returned to the House of Commons in 1880, as one of two MPs for the Borough of Bedford. By 1882 Magniac was serving as President of the London Chamber of Commerce. In 1885, the constituency's representation was reduced to one member, and Magniac was selected as Liberal candidate for the new Northern or Biggleswade Division of Bedfordshire. He was elected at the 1885 general election, but was defeated in the following election in 1886. He was chosen as Liberal candidate for the next general election, but died before it took place.

Magniac was also deeply interested in agriculture, and was a breeder of shorthorn cattle and carthorses.

== Death ==
Magniac died suddenly at his London residence in November 1891. At the time of his death he was chairman of Bedfordshire County Council, as well as a justice of the peace and deputy lieutenant for the county.

== Personal life ==
In 1857, Magniac married Augusta Dawson (24 April 1832 – 24 February 1903, née, FitzPatrick), daughter of Baron Castletown, and widow of Lieutenant-Colonel Thomas Vesey Dawson, who died in action at the Battle of Inkerman in 1854. She died during a visit to Indore, Central India on 24 February 1903. Their daughter, Helen Augusta, married the army officer and explorer Francis Younghusband, to whom her brother, Vernon, served as private secretary on the British expedition to Tibet in 1904.

Parliament of the United Kingdom
Preceded by Henry Paull	Member of Parliament for St Ives; 1868 – 1874	Succeeded by Edward Davenport
Preceded by Frederick Polhill-Turner and Samuel Whitbread	Member of Parliament for Bedford; 1880 – 1885; With: Samuel Whitbread	Succeeded by Samuel Whitbread
New constituency	Member of Parliament for Bedfordshire Northern; 1885 – 1886	Succeeded by Viscount Baring
