= James Halse =

English lawyer, businessman and politician

James Halse (bapt. 28 January 1769 – 14 May 1838) was an English lawyer and wealthy businessman in Cornwall. He was also a Tory (later Conservative) politician.

Halse settled in St Ives around 1790, where in addition to his solicitors's practice, he became town clerk and an alderman. He made his fortune through tin mines, mostly from the Wheal Reeth mine, but also from the St. Ives Consols mine.

He used the Consols mine to create a political base for himself, by building the village of Halsetown to accommodate the mine-workers. The village was within the boundaries of the parliamentary borough of St Ives, allowing Halse patronage of the borough's two seats in Parliament.

At the 1820 general election, both seats were taken by Halse's supporters, but his rival the borough-monger Sir Christopher Hawkins pursued him with charges of bribery, and at the 1826 election both Hawkins and Halse were elected.

He was defeated at the 1830 election by William Pole-Tylney-Long-Wellesley, nephew of the Duke of Wellington, but regained the seat in 1831 and held it until his death. In 1835, he was blackballed by the recently created St. Ives Library and Institution.

Parliament of the United Kingdom
Preceded by Lyndon Evelyn; Sir Christopher Hawkins, Bt	Member of Parliament for St Ives; 1826–1830; With: Sir Christopher Hawkins, Bt to 1828; Charles Arbuthnot 1828–30	Succeeded by William Pole-Tylney-Long-Wellesley; James Morrison
Preceded by William Pole-Tylney-Long-Wellesley; James Morrison	Member of Parliament for St Ives; 1831–1838; With: Edward Bulwer-Lytton to 1832	Succeeded by William Tyringham Praed
