= Clifford Cory =

British politician (1859–1941)

Sir Clifford Cory Bt

Member of Parliament for St Ives
- In office 9 February 1906 – 26 October 1922
- Preceded by: Edward Hain
- Succeeded by: John Hawke
- In office 7 December 1923 – 9 October 1924
- Preceded by: John Hawke
- Succeeded by: John Hawke

Personal details
- Born: 19 April 1859
- Died: 3 February 1941 (aged 81)

Sir Clifford John Cory, 1st Baronet (10 April 1859 – 3 February 1941) was a Welsh colliery owner, coal exporter, and Liberal Party politician.

== Family and education ==
Clifford John Cory was the son of John Cory (1828–1910), a South Wales coal broker and philanthropist. He was educated privately in Wales and on the continent. On 25 January 1893 he married Jane Ann(e) Gordon Lethbridge, the daughter of an army officer from Somerset. They only lived together for three months, and Lady Cory later applied for a judicial separation.

== Career ==
In 1886, Cory was appointed lieutenant in the 3rd Battalion, (Militia) the Welsh Regiment but his principal career was the coal trade following the example of his father and his uncle Richard Cory. Frank Owen described him as one of the "rising young coal kings of South Wales whose market was indeed the world [and who] wanted to be freed of the trammels on trade". At the time of his death in 1941, he was chairman of Cory Brothers Ltd., colliery proprietors and coal exporters of Cardiff. At one time he had been chairman of the Monmouthshire and South Wales Coal Owners Association and of the Welsh Coal Trade Conciliation Board. He was also President of Cardiff Incorporated Chamber of Commerce in 1907 and 1908 and sometime Chairman of the South Wales and Monmouthshire Schools of Mines.

== Politics ==
Cory was a typical example of the Welsh-born, nonconformist, capital-owning, elite Liberal, although this background was becoming less and less relevant in politics with the rise of class as the principal determinant of political allegiance.

Nevertheless, in the 1890s the coal-owners were still at the top of the social hierarchy in South Wales even if politically they were less inclined to involvement. Cory was something of an exception however (as he later proved to be in national Liberal politics over the issue of Home Rule). He was sometime President of Cardiff Liberals. Cory was elected to Glamorgan County Council in 1892 as member for Ystrad. He ousted the sitting member, David Thomas, the only working man who served on the previous council. Cory retained the seat until 1910, the only substantial coal owner to keep a prominent political profile in the Rhondda during this period. Cory was also High Sheriff of Monmouthshire for 1905. He also served as a justice of the peace for Glamorgan and Monmouthshire and was a deputy lieutenant of the County of Glamorgan. He was created a baronet in 1907, the Cory baronetcy of Llantarnam Abbey. Cory bought the abbey from Reginald Blewitt who had restored it in 1836.

Cory was adopted as parliamentary candidate for the Tory seat of South Monmouthshire in 1893, which he unsuccessfully contested at the 1895 general election. He was then adopted for Tonbridge in Kent for the general election of 1900, but despite fighting a campaign on religious and temperance issues which attracted the support of at least one Conservative minister of religion in the division, he was again unsuccessful. In 1900, he declined an offer to be considered as Liberal candidate for the Cornish constituency of St Ives, but by 1902 he had changed his mind and he was adopted for the seat.

=== 1906–1910 ===
Cory gained St Ives from the Liberal Unionists at the Liberal landslide victory of 1906. He held the seat as a Liberal in the elections of January and December 1910. This was in the face of a strong Tory resurgence in English agricultural seats in January 1910, the effect of which was not as marked in Cornwall. The Cornish results may be attributable to the significant nonconformist electorate there and their concerns about education against the background of the Tory preference for education to be promoted through Church of England schools. The issue of education was likely to have been a factor in Cory's initial victory in 1906 too. There was a high nonconformist turnout in 1906 in the wake of the controversy over the 1902 Education Act, which replaced school boards elected by ratepayers in their district, which had been popular with radicals, with local education authorities under the control of County or Borough Councils. Nonconformist electors objected that rate aid was being used to support the teaching of religious views which they were opposed to, "Rome on the Rates"; Anglican and Roman Catholic Church schools, supported by public funds, were not under public control and teachers in these sectarian schools were subject to religious tests. More nonconformist MPs were elected to Parliament in 1906 than Conservatives MPs.

=== 1918–1924 ===
In 1918, Cory stood and won in support of the Coalition government of David Lloyd George. He had presumably been sent the Coalition Coupon as he was without Conservative opposition (although there was an Independent Conservative who polled derisively) and he was challenged by a Labour candidate who got 38% of the poll. At the 1922 general election, Cory stood as a National Liberal as a supporter of Lloyd George. Labour did not stand a candidate, but this did not help Cory, who lost to the Unionist candidate Anthony Hawke, the Recorder of Plymouth. Cory won the seat back from Hawke in 1923 but lost again in 1924.

=== Irish Home Rule ===
Cory and his family were devoutly Protestant and hostile to the Roman Catholic religion. Cory was noted for his interest in temperance and low church evangelism. He was a particular friend of Capel Zion at Ponthir in Monmouthshire. He was also a vice-president of the council of the Christian Service Union, an organisation with the aim of providing work and training for unemployed and vagrant boys and youths. In 1898, Cory was the head of the Welsh Protestant League, which had a reputation for being rabidly anti-Catholic. This background undoubtedly influenced his strong support for the Protestant Unionist opponents of the traditional Liberal policy of Irish Home Rule. He voted against the government in 1911 supporting an amendment which would have excluded any Home Rule Bill from the operation of the Parliament Bill. In April 1912, Cory was the only Liberal MP to vote against the government in the first reading of the Home Rule Bill. He voted against the Bill again on second reading, and repeated his rebellion on the third reading of the Bill on 7 July 1913. On 14 May 1914, Cory presided at an anti-Home-Rule meeting at Caxton Hall, Westminster. He said he was in a unique position in that he was the only Liberal member returned as a declared opponent of Home Rule. At each of the last three elections, he had distinctly put in his address that he would oppose Home Rule.

However, Cory does not seem to have ever contemplated joining the Liberal Unionists and his pronounced views against Home Rule probably did him no harm against Liberal Unionist opponents in St Ives in 1906 and the two elections of 1910. The Unionist newspaper Western Morning News attributed Unionist gains in Devon and Cornwall in December 1910 to the issue of Home Rule, as did the Liberal Westminster Gazette, yet at this election, Cory marginally increased his majority and share of the vote, benefiting from anti-home-rule feeling. Local sentiment there was strongly against Irish independence on economic grounds, as it was seen as a particular threat to the livelihood of the fishermen and other maritime employees who made up much of the electorate. Opposing Home Rule also appealed to non-conformist sympathy in the constituency with the Protestant Irish and their fears that a free Ireland would be dominated by the Catholic majority, giving great weight to the influence and opinion of the Roman Catholic Church to the detriment of the civil and religious liberties of Protestants.

== Other civic interests ==
He was a founder member of the British Federation of Health and Holiday Resorts, an organisation to bring together all health spa and holiday towns to promote their business, campaign for mutually supportive legislation and extend the current summer holiday season. His St Ives constituency was already a holiday destination. St Ives town really began to open up to the outside world in 1877 when the Great Western Railway began running its broad-gauge trains on the new branch line. Not only did this increase accessibility to the rest of Cornwall for the town's residents but the railway quickly enabled St Ives to establish itself as a popular holiday destination by rail. The purposes of the British Federation of Health and Holiday Resorts were clearly a constituency vested interest for its MP. In later life, Cory took an interest in animal-welfare issues. He was a supporter of the Animal Defence and Anti-Vivisection Society and supported the main speakers at a meeting of the Society to protest against the grafting of sex glands from live monkeys into human beings held at Caxton Hall, London, in 1928.

== Personal life ==
In his personal life, Cory was a keen sportsman and particularly good polo player. His name is frequently mentioned in the sporting news of The Times newspaper for polo and in February 1909 he played for an England team against the French at the Cannes Season. He also appeared for the House of Commons team in various tournaments and for the famous Hurlingham Club, the headquarters of British polo. He was also fond of music. In 1895 he heard the "Ton Pentre Temperance" brass band from the Rhondda Valley at the opening of the Colliery Library in Gelli and offered to provide financial assistance for them resulting in the band's change of name to ‘The Cory Band’. The Cory claim to have been the first brass band to broadcast on the radio. Cory was clearly a very sociable man. He regularly attended balls, dances, concerts, film premieres, soirees, receptions, garden parties, formal luncheons, dinners, and dinner parties – which he also liked to host, whether these were politically-inspired, charity or philanthropic events, or purely social occasions. He was a regular contributor to numerous charitable causes.

== Family ==
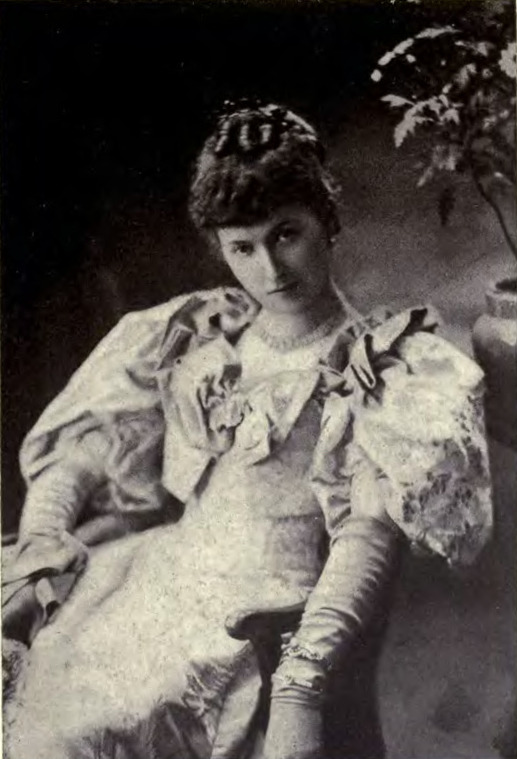
Jane Anne Gordon Lethbridge

Clifford Cory married Jane Ann Gordon, daughter of A.A.E. Lethbridge and his wife Jane, in 1893. She was born in Hamilton, Ontario, on 25 July 1865. She was educated in England. She was an amateur pianist and embroiderer in London, England.

== Death ==
Cory died at his home Llantarnam Abbey on 3 February 1941, aged 81. As he had no children, the baronetcy Llantarnam Abbey became extinct on his death.

Preceded by David Thomas	Glamorgan County Councillor for Ynyshir; 1892 – 1910	Succeeded by not known
Parliament of the United Kingdom
Preceded by Edward Hain	Member of Parliament for St Ives; 1906 – 1922	Succeeded by John Hawke
Preceded by John Hawke	Member of Parliament for St Ives; 1923 – 1924	Succeeded by John Hawke
Baronetage of the United Kingdom
New creation	Baronet (of Llantarnam Abbey, Monmouth); 1907–1941	Extinct
Preceded by Colman baronets	Cory baronets of Llantarnam Abbey; 27 November 1907	Succeeded by Donner baronets
