= John St Aubyn, 1st Baron St Levan =

British politician (1829–1908)

John St Aubyn, 1st Baron St Levan DL JP (23 October 1829 – 14 May 1908), known as Sir John St Aubyn, 2nd Baronet, from 1872 to 1887, was a British Liberal, and later Liberal Unionist, politician who sat in the House of Commons from 1858 until 1887 when he was raised to the peerage.

== Early life ==
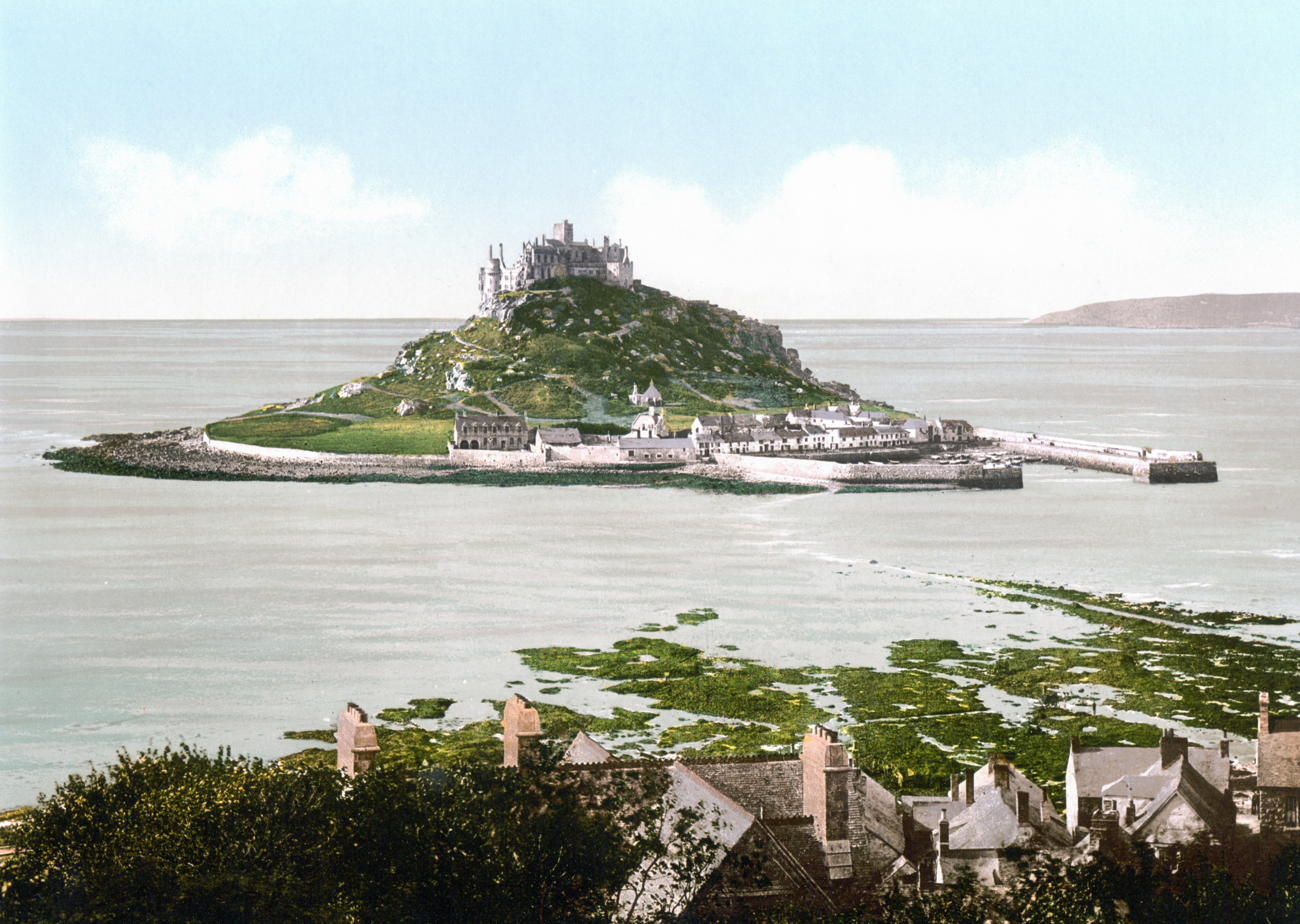
St Michael's Mount in 1900

St Aubyn was the son of Sir Edward St Aubyn, 1st Baronet, of St Michael's Mount, Cornwall, and his wife Emma (née Knollys), daughter of General William Knollys. He was educated at Eton, and at Trinity College, Cambridge. St Aubyn was Hon. Colonel of the 3rd Bttn Duke of Cornwall's Light Infantry. He was also a Deputy Lieutenant and J.P. for Cornwall, and Deputy Special Warden of the Stannaries. He was president of the Royal Geological Society of Cornwall from 1891 to 1892.

== Parliamentary service ==
St Aubyn was elected Member of Parliament for Cornwall West as a Liberal in 1858, a seat he held until 1885 when the constituency was replaced under the Redistribution of Seats Act 1885. In his original election address, according to The Times, he promised to vote for:

- abolition of Church Rates
- for the fullest extent of education
- strict economy of the public service
- admission of Jews to Parliament
- abolition of the property qualification
- for the ballot, in the event of any constituency needing the protection of it

Whilst representing West Cornwall, he was always elected unopposed.

At the 1885 general election, St Aubyn was elected as MP for St Ives in a contest that was fiercely contested. "The fight was severe", according to The Times. He disagreed with William Ewart Gladstone over Irish Home Rule and sat as a Liberal Unionist from 1886 to 1887. In the latter year St Aubyn was raised to the peerage as Baron St Levan, of St Michael's Mount in the County of Cornwall.

== Marriage, children and death ==
Lord St Levan married Lady Elizabeth Clementina, daughter of John Townshend, 4th Marquess Townshend, in 1856. They had six sons and seven daughters He died on 14 May 1908, aged 78. He was succeeded in his titles by his eldest son John (23 September 1857 – 1940). Lady St Levan died in 1910.

== Notes ==
Parliament of the United Kingdom
Preceded by Michael Williams; Richard Davey	Member of Parliament for Cornwall West; 1858–1885; With: Richard Davey 1858–1868; Arthur Pendarves Vivian 1868–1885	Constituency abolished
Preceded by Charles Campbell Ross	Member of Parliament for St Ives; 1885–1887	Succeeded by Thomas Bedford Bolitho
Peerage of the United Kingdom
New creation	Baron St Levan; 1887–1908	Succeeded by John Townshend St Aubyn
Baronetage of the United Kingdom
Preceded by Edward St Aubyn	Baronet (of St Michael's Mount); 1872–1908	Succeeded by John Townshend St Aubyn
