= Hendra, Cornwall =

Several hamlets in Cornwall, England

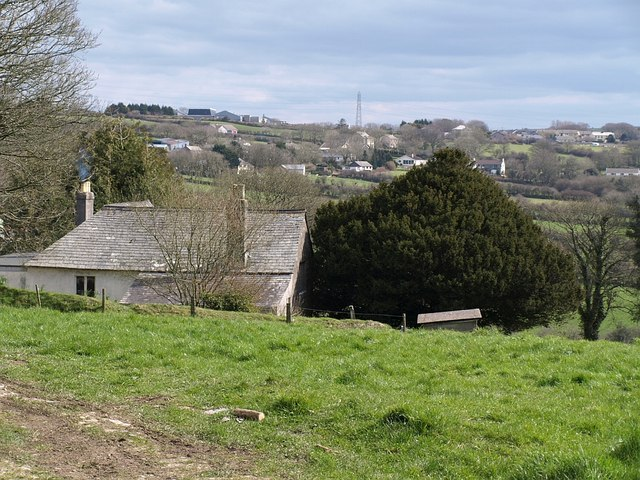
Hendra, Camelford

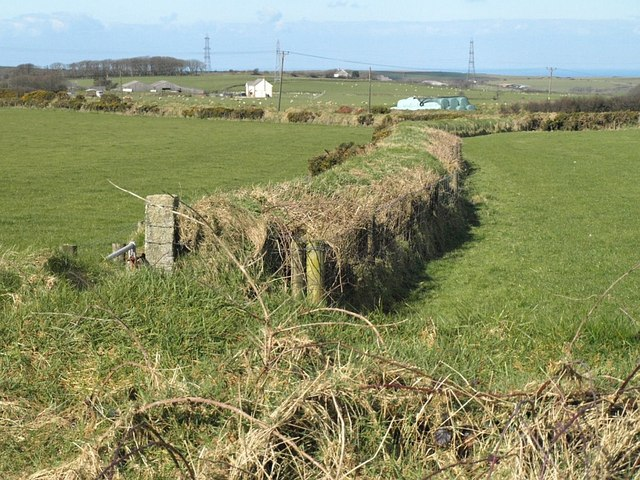
A Cornish hedge at Trehane Farm; the nearer farm is Hendra, in SX1388

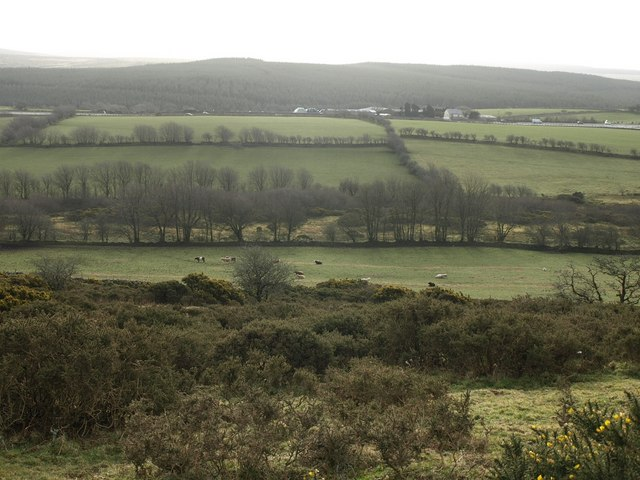
Hendra Downs, Bolventor

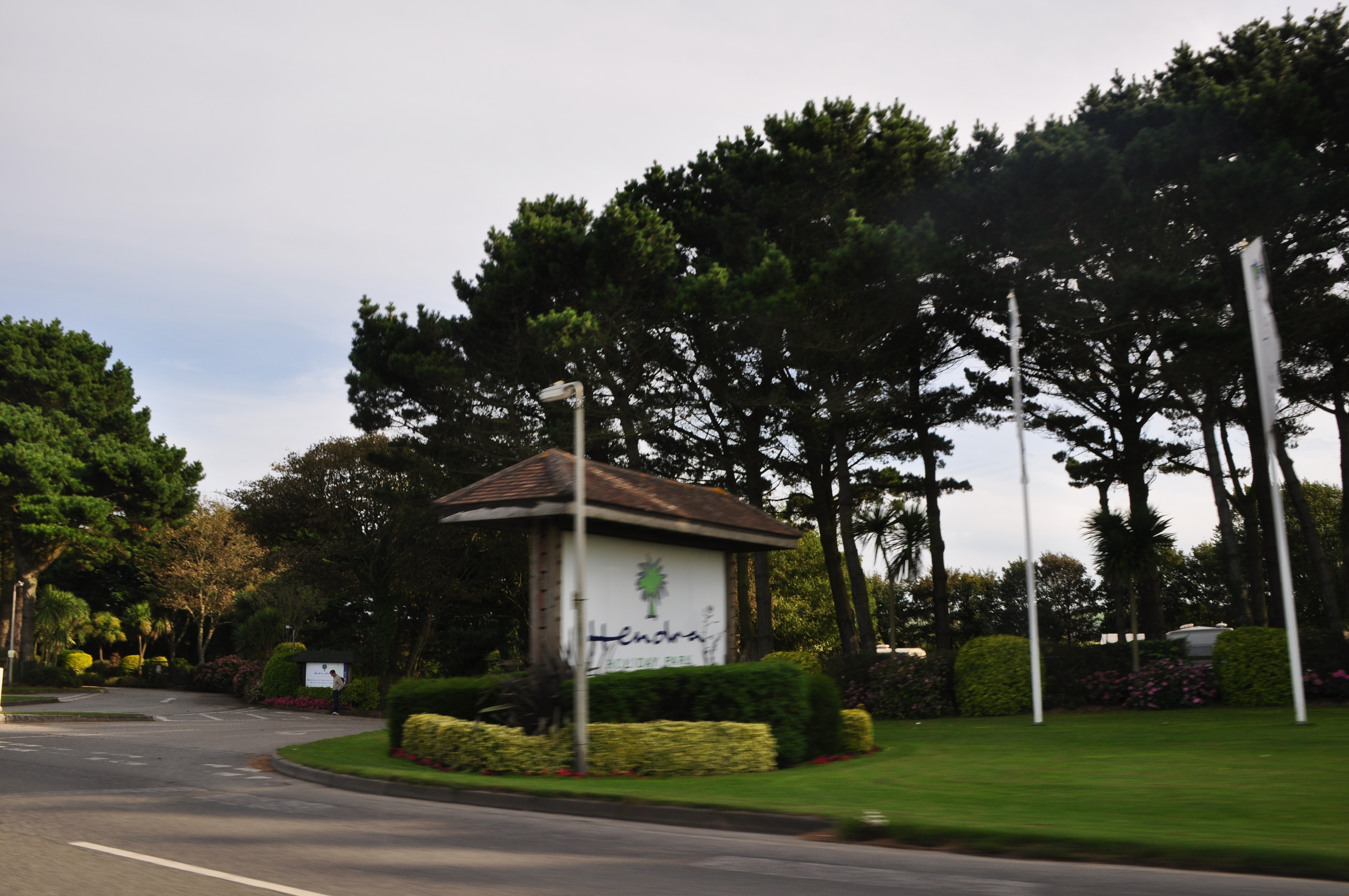
Hendra Tourist Park, Colan

Hendra is the name of eight hamlets in Cornwall, England, United Kingdom.

- Hendra, Breage (grid reference SW5927, 50°06′07″N 5°22′12″W)
- Hendra, Camelford (grid reference SX0983, 50°37′16″N 4°41′56″W)
- Hendra, Grade-Ruan (grid reference SW7017, 50°00′48″N 5°12′15″W)
- Hendra, St Dennis (grid reference SW9557, 50°22′54″N 4°53′06″W)
- Hendra, near Catchall, Sancreed (grid reference SW429277, 50°05′38″N 5°35′41″W)
- Hendra, Stithians (grid reference SW7237, 50°11′25″N 5°11′00″W)
- Hendra, Wendron (grid reference SW6931, 50°08′17″N 5°13′56″W)
- Hendra, Withiel (grid reference SW9864, 50°26′33″N 4°50′23″W)

Hendra derives from the Cornish "hendre", meaning "home farm". There are also places in Ladock, St Ives, St Just and St Teath called Hendra. It could also mean "old farm".

== Hendra Cross ==
A stone wayside cross was found at Hendra Farm, Menheniot in the early 1960s. It had been buried upside down in the ground to form a gatepost. In 1991 the two separate pieces of the cross were repaired and erected on a new base near Hendra farmhouse.

Another cross sometimes known as Hendra Cross is at a crossroads near Bossiney.

== See also ==
- List of farms in Cornwall
- Charles Henderson (Map Hendra)
