= John Townshend St Aubyn, 2nd Baron St Levan =

British army officer and peer

Brigadier-General John Townshend St Aubyn, 2nd Baron St Levan, CB, CVO, DL, JP (23 September 1857 – 10 November 1940), known as Hon. John Townshend St Aubyn from 1866 to 1908, was a British army officer and peer.

== Background and early life ==
St Aubyn was born at Balls Park, Hertford, in 1857, the eldest son of John St Aubyn (1829–1908), a Liberal Member of Parliament who was raised to the peerage as Baron St Levan in 1887. His paternal grandfather Sir Edward St Aubyn (1799–1872) had been created a Baronet, of St Michael's Mount, Cornwall, in 1866. The St Aubyn family had owned the castle and chapel on the St Michael's Mount since approximately 1650. His mother was Lady Elizabeth Clementina Townshend (1834–1910), daughter of John Townshend, 4th Marquess Townshend (1798–1863) by his wife Elizabeth Jane née Crichton-Stuart (d. 1877).

St Aubyn was educated at Eton and at Trinity College, Cambridge.

== Career ==
St. Aubyn was commissioned a second lieutenant in the Grenadier Guards on 19 October 1878, and was promoted to a lieutenant on 1 July 1881. He served in Egypt and Sudan for several years during the Mahdist War; he was Aide-de-camp (ADC) to General Sir Redvers Buller during the Suakin Expedition in 1884, where he took part in the battles of El Teb (February 1884) and Tamai (March 1884), and for which he was mentioned in despatches, received the medal with clasp, and the bronze star. Taking part in the Nile Expedition 1884–1886, he was ADC to Major-General Earle in 1883–1885 and after his death to General Henry Brackenbury in 1885, and was present at the Battle of Kirbekan (February 1885), for which he was again mentioned in despatches and received claps to the medal.

Transferring from Africa to Asia, he was ADC to Sir William Des Vœux, Governor of Hong Kong, from 1889 to 1890, and was promoted captain on 1 July 1890 and brevet major the following day. He was Military Secretary to Lord Stanley of Preston, Governor General of Canada, from 1892 to 1893, and received the substantive rank of major on 25 October 1895.

Both 2nd and 3rd battalions of the Grenadier Guards sent large contingents to serve in South Africa during the Second Boer War (1899–1902). St Aubyn served in the 1st battalion, and was in command of a detachment from this battalion sent to reinforce the 3rd battalion in March 1900. He was promoted lieutenant colonel and appointed in command of the 3rd battalion Grenadier Guards from 6 July 1902, while still in South Africa. He was in charge of more than 1100 officers and men of the guards regiments which returned to the United Kingdom on board the SS Lake Michigan in October 1902, following the end of the war earlier that year. The 3rd battalion was stationed in London after their return.

St Aubyn commanded the Grenadier Guards from 1904 to 1908, during which he was promoted to colonel in 1905, and retired from the regular army in 1908 after he inherited the barony from his father. In 1913 he accepted the Honorary Colonelcy of the Cornwall Royal Garrison Artillery, a Territorial Force unit.

Following the outbreak of the First World War, he was temporary brigadier-general from October 1914 to September 1916, received the honorary rank of brigadier-general in January 1917, and served with British Expeditionary Force in France as Staff Lieutenant from July 1917 to March 1918.

He was appointed a Commander of the Royal Victorian Order (CVO) in 1905, and a Companion of the Order of the Bath (CB) in the 1908 Birthday Honours list. He also held the 2nd class of the Prussian Order of the Red Eagle.

St Aubyn was a Deputy Warden of the Stannaries, a Justice of the peace for Cornwall, and a Deputy Lieutenant for the county from 24 August 1887, and a Provincial Grand Master of Cornish Freemasons from 1918 until his death.

He died on 10 January 1940. His barony and the estate at St. Michael's Mount was inherited by his nephew, Francis Cecil St Aubyn, son of his brother Hon. Arthur James Dudley Stuart St Aubyn (1867–1897).

== Family ==
St Aubyn married first in 1892 Lady Edith Hilaria Edgcumbe (1862–1931), daughter of William Edgcumbe, 4th Earl of Mount Edgcumbe. They had two daughters:

- Hon. Marjory Katharine Elizabeth Alexandra St Aubyn (b. 1893); who married in 1919 Hon. John Holford Parker (1886–1955), son of Albert Parker, 3rd Earl of Morley. They were the parents of John Parker, 6th Earl of Morley
- Hon. Hilaria Lily St. Aubyn (b.1894)

Following her death, he married secondly in 1933 Julia Georgina Sarah Wombwell (d 1938), widow of the 2nd Earl of Dartrey, and daughter of Sir George Orby Wombwell, 4th Baronet.

Peerage of the United Kingdom
Preceded by John St Aubyn	Baron St Levan; 1908–1940	Succeeded by Francis Cecil St Aubyn
