= Edward Hain =

British politician

Sir Edward Hain JP

Member of Parliament for St Ives
- In office 24 October 1900 – 8 January 1906
- Preceded by: Thomas Bedford Bolitho
- Succeeded by: Clifford Cory

Personal details
- Born: 26 December 1851 St Ives, Cornwall
- Died: 20 September 1917 (aged 65) St Ives, Cornwall
- Spouse: Catherine Seward (m. 1882)
- Children: Grace; Edward; Kate
- Parent: Edward Hain (1829 – 1899)
- Occupation: Shipping magnate, politician

Sir Edward Hain, JP (26 December 1851 – 20 September 1917) was an English shipping magnate and politician from Cornwall, England. He represented St Ives as a Liberal Unionist from 1900 to 1904, and as a Liberal from 1904 to 1906. His shipping company, Hain Line, was sold to the recently merged Peninsular and Oriental Steam Navigation Company and British-India Steam Navigation Company after his death.

== Personal life ==
Edward Hain was the son of Edward Hain, a shipping magnate and the latest in a long line of shipowners from Cornwall. Hain was born at St Ives in December 1851 and received his education locally at Mr James Rowe's school, at Academy Steps, in Fore Street.

Hain did not originally intend to go into shipping. He went to London to work with a bank and then with a tea merchant. However, on his return to St Ives in 1878, his experience in the tea trade had convinced him that the family company should switch from sail to steam.

In 1882, he was married to Catherine Seward. They had two daughters, one of whom died. Their son, Captain Edward Hain, was killed in the First World War while serving with the 1st Devon Yeomanry at Gallipoli. The Edward Hain Hospital in St Ives was named after Captain Edward Hain.

He owned "nearly all the lands between St Ives, Towednack and Zennor, known as the Porthia Estate. In 1892, Hain built for himself Treloyhan Manor overlooking St Ives Bay. Sir Edward’s family kept Treloyhan until about 1928, when the property was sold to a company formed to develop part of the extensive grounds as a building estate. The mansion itself was converted into a hotel, the Treloyhan Manor Hotel, which opened on 1 July 1930. During the Second World War, between 1941 and 1945, it housed the girls of Downs School, evacuated from Seaford in Sussex. In 1947, the building was acquired by the Wesley Guild for use as a guest house.

Hain was described as an "ardent Nonconformist"; he was a benefactor of the United Methodist Church in St Ives and had a "very great interest" in temperance. Hain died on 20 September 1917, aged 65. He was survived by his widow and his daughter, Kate, who married Denis Shipwright on 21 March 1918. Shipwright would be elected as a Conservative MP for Penryn and Falmouth at the 1922 general election.

== Business ==
On his return to St Ives from London, he told his father that he could see no future in a line of small sailing vessels, and that if his father were not prepared to switch to steamships, he would leave the family business and seek a new career elsewhere. Despite the company's long association with sailing ships, he was able to convince his sceptical father that the future of shipping depended on steam. He visited the shipyard of John Readhead & Co at South Shields with finance provided by Bolitho's bank (the forerunner of Barclays; a director, Thomas Bedford Bolitho, preceded Hain as MP of St Ives) and placed the first of many orders for the company. The first steamer was launched on 19 November 1878 and named Trewidden in honour of the Bolitho estate outside Penzance. The relationship between Hain and Readhead produced eighty-seven ships for the company, all with the prefix ‘Tre’ a Cornish word for "farmstead". Trewidden was an iron-built 1,800-ton vessel, schooner-rigged, 240 feet long, and propelled by a screw. Other ships included Tregenna, Trevethoe, Trevarrack, Trevalgan, Tremeadow, Treveal and Trelyon (a variant spelling of "Treloyhan", the Hain's estate).

By 1901, he had founded a number of steamship companies (Edward Hain and Son, St Ives; Foster Hain and Co, Cardiff; Foster Hain and Read, London). These were merged into one limited liability company — The Hain Steamship Company Limited - which owned twenty-two steamers.

In 1910, he was made President of the Chamber of Shipping of the United Kingdom having previously been vice-president.

In 1917, the shares of the Hain Line (valued at £4m) were sold to P&O and British India Steam Navigation Company. The twenty-seven Hain Line cargo steamers, totalling 108,787 gross tons had all been built by J Readhead and Sons of South Shields. The Hain Steamship Company remained a separate operating subsidiary of P&O until 1964, when it merged a number of subsidiaries.

Hain was proprietor of The Cornish Telegraph newspaper which he sold to The Cornishman but he was always best known for his shipping company.

== Political life ==
Hain was elected to the St Ives Town Council in 1883 and was unanimously elected mayor a year later; he held that office for three successive years and six times in total. He also spent thirteen years on Cornwall County Council representing St Ives. He was made a Justice of the Peace in 1885. He was a Liberal and a "warm supporter" of Gladstone until the party split over Irish Home Rule, when he became a Liberal Unionist.

In 1900, when Thomas Bedford Bolitho retired as MP, Hain offered himself as successor and was elected unopposed. He subsequently declined re-election as mayor of St Ives due to parliamentary and other duties.

In 1903 he had already announced that as a supporter of Free Trade he could no longer support the government of Arthur Balfour and, in 1904, he signed an open letter siding with the views of the Duke of Devonshire rather than Joseph Chamberlain, the leading advocate of "tariff reform" (that is, imposing high tariffs in place of free trade). Devonshire and other supporters of Free Trade left the Liberal Unionist Association in 1904; Hain thenceforth sat as a Liberal.

At the 1906 general election, Hain retired as MP partly on political grounds and partly for health reasons and to devote himself more completely to shipping politics.

He received a knighthood in the Birthday Honours in 1910 and in 1912, he was High Sheriff of Cornwall.

Parliament of the United Kingdom
Preceded by Thomas Bedford Bolitho	Member of Parliament for St Ives; 1900 – 1906	Succeeded by Clifford Cory
