= Thomas Bedford Bolitho =

British banker and industrialist

Member of Parliament for St Ives
- In office 9 July 1887 – 25 September 1900
- Preceded by: John St Aubyn
- Succeeded by: Edward Hain

Personal details
- Born: 5 January 1835 Penzance, Cornwall, England
- Died: 22 May 1915 (aged 80) Penzance, Cornwall, England
- Spouse: Frances Jane Carus-Wilson
- Children: Mary (1894–1977)
- Parent(s): Edward Bolitho; Mary Bolitho née Stephens
- Education: Harrow School
- Occupation: Banker, industrialist, politician

Thomas Bedford Bolitho (5 January 1835 – 22 May 1915) was a British banker and industrialist. He was a Liberal Unionist Member of Parliament for St Ives in Cornwall from 1887 to 1900.

== Early life ==
Born in Penzance, Bolitho was the third son, and the only one to survive to adulthood, of Edward and Mary Bolitho (née Stephens). He was educated at Harrow School.

== Politics and industry ==
In 1882, Bolitho bought at auction, the Greenway and Galmpton estates, near Dartmouth for £42,500 plus approximately £3,000 for timber and fixtures. He also bought the tenements of Catchall, Kerris and Rospletha to add to the Hendra and Trevelloe estates he already owned.

He was appointed High Sheriff of Cornwall in 1884. Following the elevation to the peerage of the St Ives MP, Sir John St Aubyn, Bolitho became MP at a by-election in 1887. He was re-elected in 1892 and 1895. He was unopposed on all three occasions.

Bolitho was a director of Barclays Bank and Bolitho, Williams, Foster, Coode, Grylls & Co. He was President of the Institute of Bankers from 1893 to 1895. He was also a director of the Great Western Railway and owner of the Consolidated Tin Smelting Company.

== Family life ==
He married, at the age of 58, Frances Jane Carus-Wilson in Truro Cathedral on 9 December 1893 – The Cornishman devoted a whole page to a report of the ceremonies. They had a daughter, Mary (1894–1977). He died, aged 80, on 22 May 1915 in Penzance. His estate was valued at £550,038 gross.

There is a portrait by Camille Silvy in the National Portrait Gallery.

His cousin, Thomas Robins Bolitho, (1840-1925), was an English banker, who served as High Sheriff of Cornwall in 1890.

== Trewidden Gardens ==
Bolitho continued his father's work in the garden at the family home of Trewidden, two miles west of Penzance. In particular, he filled the old opencast mine with tree ferns (Dicksonia antarctica) newly imported from Australia. This is now known as the Tree Fern Dell, which has been described as the best stand of tree ferns in the northern hemisphere. Following the death of her husband in 1955, Bolitho's daughter, Mary Williams, returned to Trewidden and took over the garden. Alverne Bolitho (born 1961), a cousin of Mary Williams, inherited the property when she died and has developed it into a popular tourist attraction.

Parliament of the United Kingdom
Preceded by John St Aubyn	Member of Parliament for St Ives; 1887 – 1900	Succeeded by Edward Hain
