= Anthony Hawke (judge, born 1869) =

British politician (1869–1941)

Sir Anthony Hawke

Justice of the High Court
- In office 1928 – 30 October 1941

Personal details
- Born: 7 June 1869
- Died: 30 October 1941 (aged 72)

Sir John Anthony Hawke (7 June 1869 – 30 October 1941), known as Anthony Hawke and later as Mr Justice Hawke, was a Unionist politician in England who served in the 1920s as Member of Parliament (MP) for St Ives in Cornwall, before becoming a High Court judge.

== Life ==
Educated at Merchant Taylors' School and St John's College, Oxford (where he was a scholar and gained first class Honours in Law), Hawke was called to the bar from the Middle Temple in 1892. He joined the Western Circuit in 1893 and went on to become Attorney-General to the Prince of Wales (1923–1928) and Recorder of Plymouth.

He was elected to the House of Commons at his first attempt, at the 1922 general election, when he defeated the sitting National Liberal Member, Sir Clifford Cory. Cory regained the seat at the 1923 general election but was again unseated by Hawke at the 1924 election.

Hawke resigned from Parliament in 1928, when he was appointed to the High Court of Justice. He was knighted at the same time. He died on circuit in 1941.

He was a member of the Carlton, Garrick, Devon and Exeter, and Royal Western Yacht clubs. He married Winifred Edith Laura (née Stevens) and their son Sir Edward Anthony Hawke was also a judge and the Common Serjeant of London and Recorder of London.

== Notable cases ==
=== Court of Appeal ===
Hawke sat with Lord Chief Justice Hewart and Mr Justice Branson in the Court of Criminal Appeal on 18 and 19 May 1931 to hear an appeal against a conviction for murder in R. v. Wallace. For the first time ever, the Court overturned a conviction in a capital case on the ground that the verdict "can not be supported having regard to the evidence".

Parliament of the United Kingdom
Preceded by Sir Clifford Cory, Bt.	Member of Parliament for St Ives; 1922–1923	Succeeded by Sir Clifford Cory, Bt.
Preceded by Sir Clifford Cory, Bt.	Member of Parliament for St Ives; 1924–1928	Succeeded by Hilda Runciman
