= 1846 St Ives by-election =

UK parliamentary by-election

The 1846 St Ives by-election was an uncontested election held on 21 July 1846 for the constituency of St Ives in England. The by-election was brought about due to the death of the incumbent Conservative MP, William Tyringham Praed. It was won by the Conservative candidate William Powlett, who was the only declared candidate.
