= 1874 St Ives by-election =

UK parliamentary by-election

The 1874 St Ives by-election was fought on 28 December 1874. The by-election was fought due to the death of the incumbent Conservative MP, Edward Davenport. It was won by the Conservative candidate Charles Praed who received 617 votes against Liberal candidate Sir Francis Lycett's 552 votes. During the election, the town held a holiday, with shops closed and ships not leaving harbour.

Praed's election was later declared void, resulting in a further by-election in 1875, where Praed was returned again to the seat.
