= Edward Hain Hospital =

- Cornwall Partnership NHS Foundation Trust
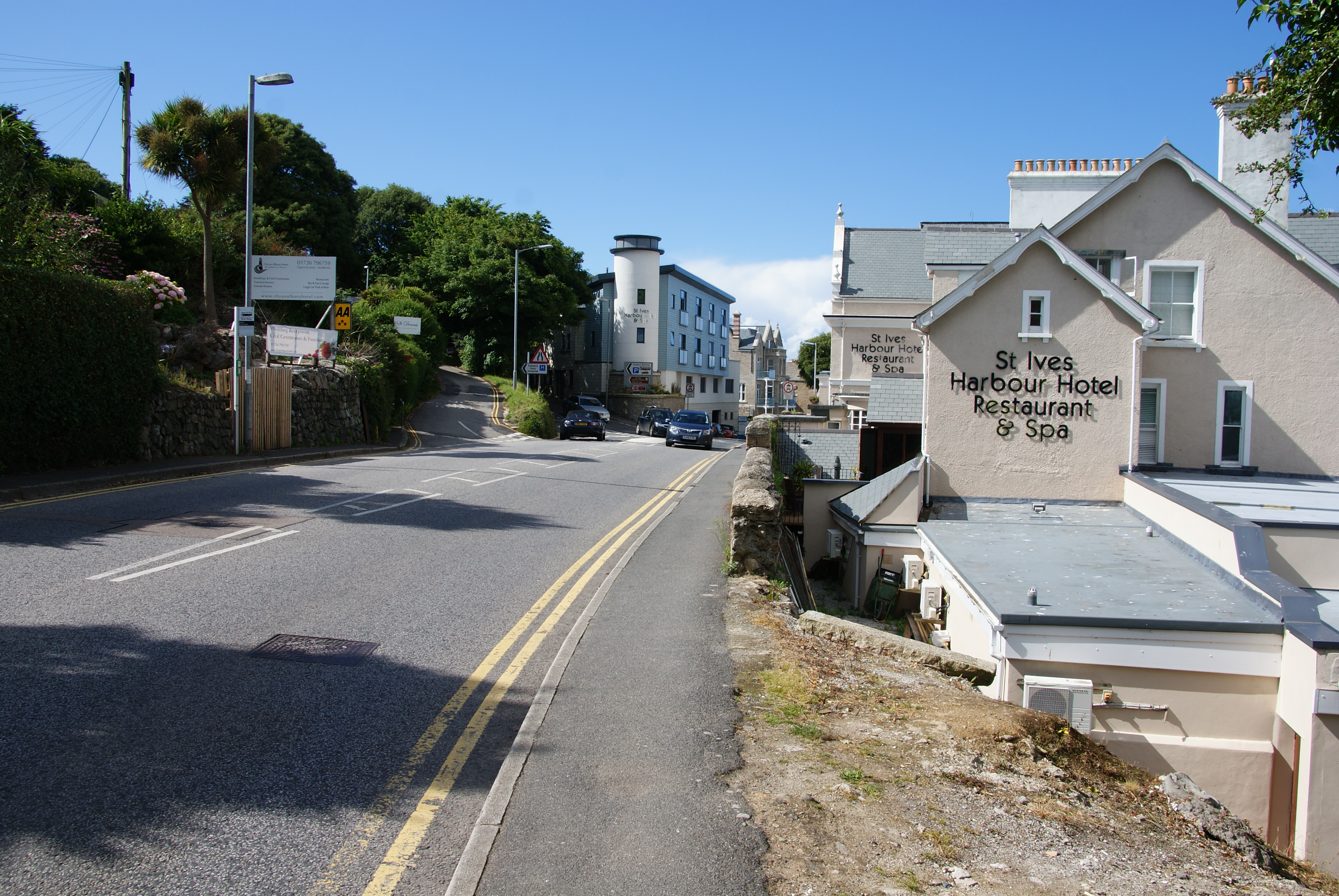
- Entrance to the Edward Hain Hospital (the road on the left)

- Shown in Cornwall

Geography
- Location: Albany Terrace, St Ives, Cornwall, England
- Coordinates: 50.2080°N 5.4793°W

Organisation
- Care system: NHS
- Type: Community

History
- Founded: 1920

Edward Hain Hospital is a health facility in Albany Terrace, St Ives, Cornwall, England. It is managed by Cornwall Partnership NHS Foundation Trust.

== History ==
The facility was commissioned as a memorial to Captain Edward Hain, (Note: He was the son of Sir Edward Hain, the local member of parliament.) who had died in the First World War. It was established by converting a large private property in Albany Terrace and it opened in 1920. It joined the National Health Service in 1948. It closed temporarily due to fire safety issues in 2016 but then re-opened in 2019 as part of a pilot programme to provide facilities for local people who have recently been discharged from hospital.
