= Charles Campbell Ross =

British politician and banker

- Born: 1849
- Died: 9 July 1920 (aged 70–71)
- Education: Brighton College
- Occupations: Politician; Banker
- Spouse: Isabella Emily Holland
- Children: Archibald Campbell Carne Ross a daughter
- Parent(s): Dr Archibald Campbell Colquhoun Ross and Mary Carne

Charles Campbell Ross (born London 1849; died 9 July 1920, Whitechapel) was a British politician and banker based in Penzance, Cornwall. He was mayor of Penzance on five occasions and was also the member of parliament for the St Ives constituency (1881–1885).

== Personal life ==
The grandson of the banker Joseph Carne through his eldest daughter Mary (who married, 9 August 1836, Dr Archibald Campbell Colquhoun Ross, of Lanarkshire). He was educated at Brighton College and his family home and estate in Penzance are now the Morrab Library and Morrab Gardens. He married, in 1870, his cousin Isabella Emily Carne, nee Holland (died 20 December 1888). They had a daughter and their son Archibald Campbell Carne Ross was the father of the linguist Alan S C Ross.

== Career ==
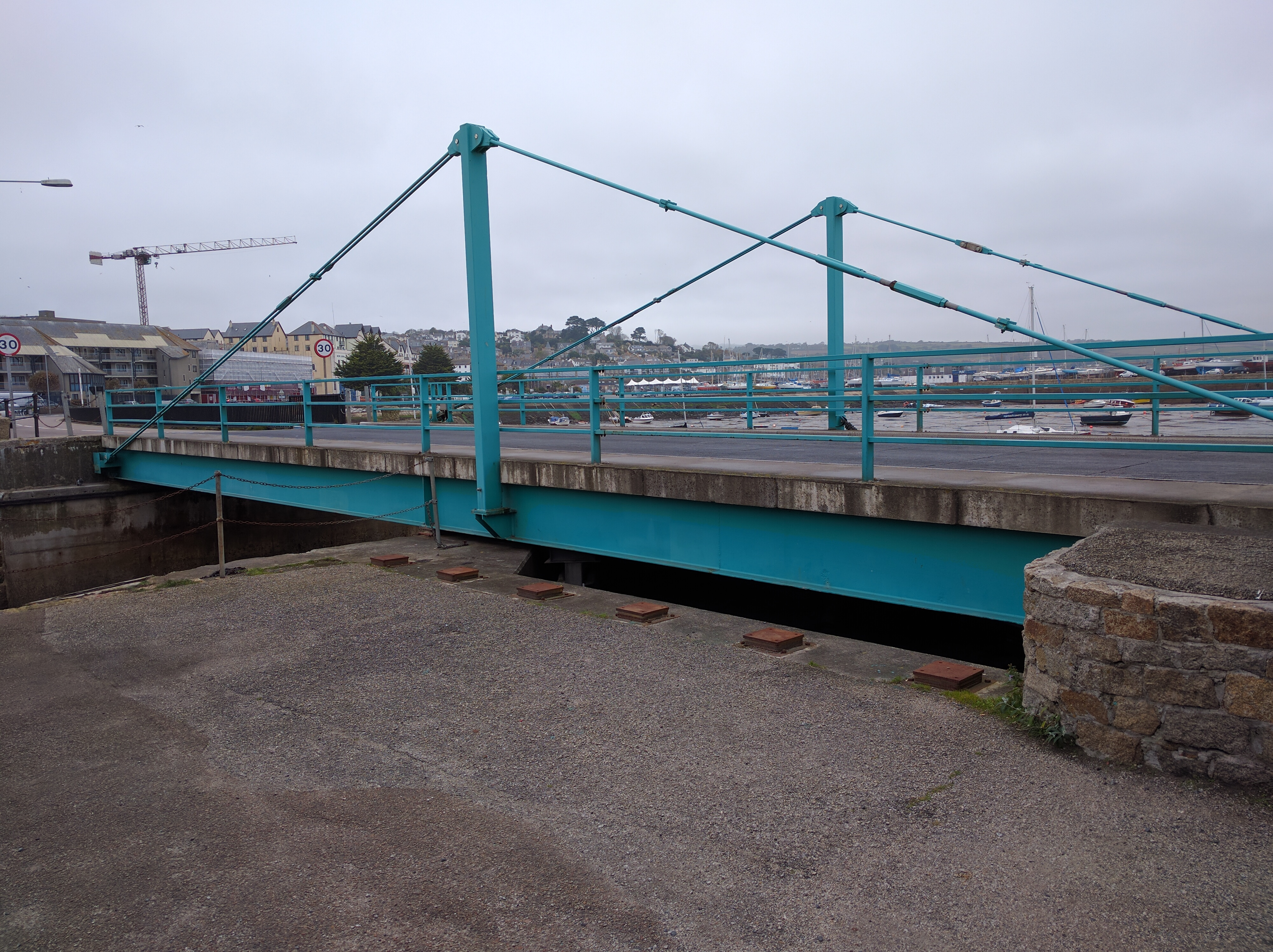
Ross Bridge, named after Charles Ross

He was a leading member of the Penzance Borough Council in the 1880s serving as mayor five times in 1877, 1878, 1879, 1881 and 1883. During this period he was also member of parliament for the St Ives constituency (1881–1885) as a member of the Conservative Party. The General Election of 1885 was "fiercely contested" and he was defeated by the Liberal candidate, Sir John St Aubyn. He also held the positions of borough magistrate, county magistrate and Hon Secretary of the West Cornwall Infirmary.

Charles Ross was a major partner in the Penzance Bank (otherwise known as Batten, Carne and Carne) which had major branches in Penzance and Devonport. He inherited the position from his grandfather the well known Cornish banker and geologist Joseph Carne FRS. In 1896 the Penzance bank ceased trading, and was wound up by 1897. Following the collapse of the bank Charles Ross moved to London and became a curator of a museum in the east of the city.

The Ross bridge in Penzance is named after Charles Ross.

Parliament of the United Kingdom
Preceded by Sir Charles Reed	Member of Parliament for St Ives; 1881 – 1885	Succeeded by Sir John St Aubyn
