= John St Aubyn, 4th Baron St Levan =

John Francis Arthur St Aubyn, 4th Baron St Levan OBE DSC DL (23 February 1919 – 7 April 2013) was a British hereditary peer, decorated Royal Navy officer, solicitor, and heritage figure. From 1978 to 2003, he was custodian of the family seat of St Michael's Mount in Cornwall.

== Early life ==
St Aubyn was born on 23 February 1919 in London, England. He was the eldest son of the 3rd Lord St Levan and his wife. His childhood was split between his parents' home in London and the family seat of St Michael's Mount, Cornwall. He was educated at Eton College, an all-boys public boarding school in Eton, Berkshire. In 1938, he entered Trinity College, Cambridge to study for a degree. His university studies were interrupted by World War II and his military service.

== Military service ==
During his first year at university, in 1938, St Aubyn joined the Royal Naval Volunteer Reserve (RNVR) as an officer cadet. With the outbreak of World War II in 1939, he was allowed to continue at university. However, he did not complete his degree. He left university at the end of his second year to join up, having heard about the Dunkirk Evacuation (27 May to 4 June 1940). He and a friend travelled by train from Cambridge to Chatham, Kent. There, they underwent an interview, and, being officer cadets in the RNVR, they were accepted for immediate service.

Having been recruited in Chatham, he was sent to Ramsgate, Kent, to take command of a ship. He became captain of a newly seized Belgian merchant ship, therefore gaining his first independent command at 21 years old. He and his command then joined the little ships of Dunkirk and he became involved in the Dunkirk Evacuation. He and his ship rescued 150 men from the beaches.

Then he attended a training course to learn about mine sweeping. In August 1940, he was re-graded from temporary acting sub-lieutenant to temporary sub-lieutenant with seniority from 23 February 1940. Having completed his training, he was posted to the Halcyon-class minesweeper HMS Salamander.

== Personal life ==
St Aubyn married Susan (Sue) Maria Marcia Kennedy, daughter of Maj.-Gen. Sir John Noble Kennedy, in December 1970; she died in 2003. There were no children of the marriage.

St Aubyn was succeeded in the barony and the baronetcy by his nephew James St Aubyn (born 6 June 1950) who became the 5th Lord St Levan. The 5th baron is the son of Hon Oliver Piers St Aubyn (born 12 July 1920, died 24 May 2006) who was the second son of the 3rd baron.

Peerage of the United Kingdom
Preceded by Francis St Aubyn	Baron St Levan; 1978–2013	Succeeded by James St Aubyn
