= Edward Davenport (Conservative politician) =

Edward Davenport MP

Member of Parliament for St Ives
- In office 5 February 1874 – 4 December 1874
- Preceded by: Charles Magniac
- Succeeded by: Charles Praed

Personal details
- Born: 1838
- Died: 4 December 1874 (aged 36)
- Party: Conservative

Edward Gershour Davenport (1838 – 4 December 1874) was a British Conservative Party politician.

Davenport was elected MP for St Ives in 1874, but died less than a year afterwards.

Parliament of the United Kingdom
Preceded by Charles Magniac	Member of Parliament for St Ives; 1874–1874	Succeeded by Charles Praed
