= William Tyringham Praed =

British banker and Conservative politician

Member of Parliament for St Ives
- In office 24 May 1838 – 8 July 1846
- Preceded by: James Halse
- Succeeded by: William Powlett

Personal details
- Born: 1780
- Died: 8 July 1846 (aged 65–66) St James's Place, London, England
- Party: Conservative

William Tyringham Praed (1780 – 8 July 1846) was a British banker and Conservative politician.

Praed was the second son of William Praed of Tyringham, Buckinghamshire—who had been Member of Parliament (MP) for St Ives from 1774 to 1775, and 1780 to 1806, and Banbury form 1806 to 1808—and Elizabeth Tyringham née Backwell. He never married.

Praed followed his father into politics, also sitting for St Ives after being elected a Conservative MP at a by-election in 1838—caused by the death of James Halse. He held the seat until his own death in 1846.

Upon his death in 1846 at his home in St James's Place, London, the entire of his freehold property was passed to his sister, Elizabeth, wife of Richard Hoare, and, upon her death, to special trusts. His furniture, plate, and other effects at his mansion in Trevethow, Cornwall, were passed to his nephew, Charles Praed, son of Charles Backwell Praed. His shares in the Grand Junction and Grand Union Canal companies were bequeathed in portions as well as several pecuniary legacies. He also passed £1,000 to charities, in sums of between £50 and £100. A further £100 was given to the Rector of Lelant, Cornwall to be distributed in the parish, £100 to Cornwall County Infirmary, and £100 to the Buckinghamshire Infirmary in Aylesbury. The remainder of his estate was to be distributed between his nephews and niece by his sister Sarah Arabella. In total, he died with around £45,000 in wealth.

Parliament of the United Kingdom
| Preceded by James Halse | Member of Parliament for St Ives; 1838–1846 | Succeeded by William Powlett |
