= 1881 St Ives by-election =

UK Parliamentary by-election

The 1881 St Ives by-election was fought on 11 April 1881. The by-election was fought due to the death of the incumbent Liberal MP, Sir Charles Reed. The seat was gained by the Conservatives.

St Ives by-election, 1881
Party	Candidate	Votes	%	±%
Conservative	Charles Campbell Ross	462	56.2	+8.8
Liberal	William Cole Pendarves	360	43.8	−8.8
Majority		102	12.4	N/A
Turnout		822	81.2	−0.4
Registered electors		1,012		
Conservative gain from Liberal		Swing	+8.8	
