= 1838 St Ives by-election =

UK parliamentary by-election

The 1838 St Ives by-election was an election held on 24 May 1838. The by-election was brought about due to the death of the incumbent Conservative MP, James Halse. It was won by the Conservative candidate William Tyringham Praed.

By-election, 24 May 1838: St Ives
Party	Candidate	Votes	%	±%
Conservative	William Tyringham Praed	256	50.8	+5.7
Conservative	Francis Hearle Stephens	248	49.2	−5.7
Majority		8	1.6	−8.2
Turnout		504	86.0	+0.5
Registered electors		586		
Conservative hold		Swing	+5.7	
