= Cory baronets of Coryton (1919) =

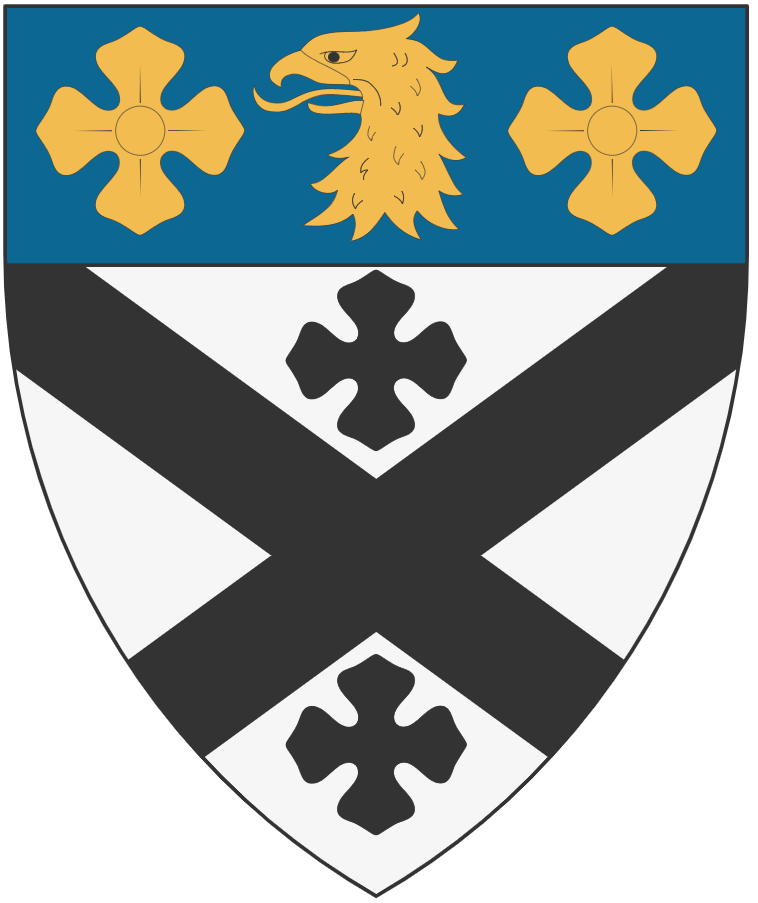
Escutcheon of the Cory baronets of Coryton

The Cory baronetcy, of Coryton in Whitchurch in the County of Glamorgan, was created in the Baronetage of the United Kingdom on 13 May 1919 for the businessman and Conservative politician Herbert Cory. He was a director of John Cory and Sons, shipowners, and sat as Member of Parliament for Cardiff and Cardiff South.

The title is as of 2026 marked vacant on the Official Roll.

== Cory baronets, of Coryton (1919) ==
- Sir (James) Herbert Cory, 1st Baronet (1857–1933)
- Sir Herbert George Donald Cory, 2nd Baronet (1879–1935)
- Sir Vyvyan Donald Cory, 3rd Baronet (1906–1941)
- Sir Clinton James Donald Cory, 4th Baronet (1909–1991)
- Sir (Clinton Charles) Donald Cory, 5th Baronet (1937–2022)
- Sir James Maurice Perkins Cory, 6th Baronet (born 1966). He does not currently appear on the Official Roll of the Baronetage

The heir presumptive is the present holder's first cousin Jonathan Andrew Campbell Perkins Cory (born 1970).
