= 1887 St Ives by-election =

UK Parliamentary by-election

The 1887 St Ives by-election was held on 9 July 1887 after the incumbent Liberal Unionist MP, Sir John St Aubyn being elevated to the Peerage. The seat was retained by the Liberal Unionist candidate, Thomas Bedford Bolitho, who was unopposed.
