= Robert Laffan (British Army officer) =

Sir Robert Michael Laffan KCMG FRSA (21 September 1821 – 22 March 1882) was an Irish officer of the Royal Engineers, politician, and governor of Bermuda.

== Early life ==
The third son of John Laffan, of Skehanagh, counties Clare and Limerick, he was born on 21 September 1821. Educated at the college of Pont Levoy, near Blois, France, he went to the Royal Military Academy, Woolwich, in September 1835, and on 5 May 1837 was gazetted a second lieutenant in the Royal Engineers.

== Career ==
After serving for two years at Chatham and Woolwich, and becoming first lieutenant on 1 April 1839, Laffan was sent to South Africa, where he was employed in frontier service. He was one of the officers summoned by the governor, Sir George Napier, to a council of war in order to concert measures for the relief of Captain Thomas Charlton Smith and the garrison of Port Natal, then beleaguered by a force of Boers under Andries Pretorius. Laffan took charge of the engineering arrangements of the expedition, under Abraham Josias Cloete, which relieved the British garrison.

From the Cape, Laffan was sent to Mauritius, where he was promoted captain on 1 May 1846. On his return home in 1847 he was appointed commanding Royal Engineer at Belfast. At the close of the year was nominated an inspector of railways under the Board of Trade, a post he held until the autumn of 1852, when he was sent to Paris and Antwerp to report on the defences for the information of Sir John Fox Burgoyne, the inspector-general of fortifications.

Laffan represented the borough of St Ives, Cornwall, in the House of Commons from 1852 to 1857 in the Conservative interest. In 1854 he was appointed commanding royal engineer in the London district, and in 1855 he was sent by the Duke of Newcastle, then secretary of state for war, with William Thomas Knollys and Sir George Maclean, to report on the organisation of the French ministère de la guerre. On his return to England in May 1855 he was appointed deputy inspector-general of fortifications at the War Office. From 1858 to 1860 he was absent on sick leave in the south of France and Switzerland.

Laffan was promoted brevet-major on 26 October 1858, and became a regimental lieutenant-colonel on 28 November 1859. On his return from sick leave he was stationed at Portsmouth for a short time, and towards the end of 1860 he was sent to Malta as commanding Royal Engineer. He remained there for five years, during which the armament of the fortress was completely revised. He was promoted brevet-colonel on 28 November 1864.

In 1865 Laffan was sent to Ceylon as a member of a commission to investigate and report on the military expenditure of the colony and the strength of the force to be maintained there in time of peace. He was at the same time deputed to report specially to the secretary of state for war on the defences. On his way home, under instructions from the war office, he visited the Suez Canal with Ferdinand de Lesseps, and he made a report to the secretary of state for war. He revisited Egypt at the invitation of de Lesseps, to witness the opening of the canal in November 1869.

In 1866 Laffan was appointed commanding Royal Engineer at Aldershot; he transformed the appearance of the camp by planting trees and laying down grass, and the old Queen's Birthday Parade was later renamed Laffan's Plain in his memory. (Years later it became part of Farnborough Aerodrome.) He was promoted regimental colonel on 9 February 1870. In January 1872 he was sent to Gibraltar as commanding Royal Engineer, and remained there for five years.

On 27 April 1877, Laffan was appointed governor and commander-in-chief of the Bermudas, with the rank of brigadier-general, and on 30 May the same year was made K.C.M.G. In the Gazette of 2 October 1877 he was promoted major-general, and under the provisions of the royal warrant then just issued his rank was antedated to 8 February 1870. He was promoted lieutenant-general on 1 July 1881.

== Family ==
Laffan married in 1852 Emma, daughter of W. Norsworthy, and left a daughter and four sons. The eldest son, R. S. de Courcy Laffan, married Bertha Jane Grundy, as her second husband. Another son, Henry David Laffan (1858–1931) was a colonel in the Royal Engineers, who took part in the geodetic survey of the Cape Colony and Natal in 1883 to 1888.

== Death ==
Laffan died on Bermuda, at Mount Langton, 22 March 1882. His body lay in state for two days, and was buried with military honours in Pembroke churchyard, Bermuda.
