= Charles Praed =

British politician

Charles Praed MP

Member of Parliament for St Ives
- In office 8 March 1875 – 7 April 1880
- Preceded by: Edward Davenport
- Succeeded by: Charles Reed

Personal details
- Born: 1833
- Died: 19 October 1895 (aged 62)
- Party: Conservative
- Education: Merton College, Oxford

Charles Tyringham Praed (1833 – 19 October 1895) was a British Conservative Party politician.

Davenport was elected MP for St Ives at a by-election in 1874, but was quickly unseated after the election was declared void on petition grounds of "general treating". However, he regained the seat at the subsequent by-election in 1875 and remained MP until 1880 when he stepped down.

Parliament of the United Kingdom
Preceded by Edward Davenport	Member of Parliament for St Ives; 1875–1880	Succeeded by Charles Reed
