= 1875 St Ives by-election =

UK parliamentary by-election

The 1875 St Ives by-election was fought on 5 March 1875. The by-election was caused by the previous by-election being declared void on petition, on grounds of "general treating". It was retained by Conservative MP, Charles Praed.

1875 St Ives by-election
| Party | Candidate | Votes | % | ±% |
|---|---|---|---|---|
| Conservative | Charles Praed | 658 | 54.5 | −9.0 |
| Liberal | Francis Lycett | 550 | 45.5 | +9.0 |
| Majority | | 108 | 9.0 | −18.0 |
| Turnout | | 1,208 | 85.7 | +3.0 |
| Registered electors | | 1,410 | | |
| Conservative hold | | Swing | -9.0 | |
