= Pembroke Wesleyan Cemetery =

Cemetery in Bermuda

Coordinates: 32°17′59″N 64°47′25″W

Pembroke Wesleyan Cemetery, also known as Wesley Methodist Church Cemetery, is in the Pembroke district of Bermuda between Cemetery Road and Cemetery Lane. It is shared with Grace Methodist Church.

The cemetery includes two graves of war dead maintained by the Commonwealth War Graves Commission, one Canadian and one British. Its gates were donated by the children of Chesley and Gladys White, residents of Pembroke, in memory of their parents.
