= St Ives (constituency) =

Parliamentary constituency in the United Kingdom, 1885 onwards

- County constituency for the House of Commons
- Interactive map of boundaries since 2024
- Boundary of St Ives in Cornwall

- Location of Cornwall within England
- County: Cornwall
- Electorate: 69,978 (2024)
- Major settlements: St Ives, Penzance and Helston

Current constituency
- Created: 1885
- Member of Parliament: Andrew George (Lib Dem)
- Seats: One
- Created from: Helston, St Ives and West Cornwall

1558–1885
- Seats: 1558–1832: two 1832–1885: one
- Type of constituency: Borough constituency
- Replaced by: St Ives, Penzance and Helston

St Ives is a parliamentary constituency covering the western end of Cornwall, including the Isles of Scilly. (Note: A county constituency (for the purposes of election expenses and type of returning officer).) The constituency has been represented in the House of Commons of the UK Parliament since 2024 by Andrew George, a Liberal Democrat; George previously represented the constituency from 1997 to 2015. (Note: As with all constituencies, the constituency elects one Member of Parliament (MP) by the first past the post system of election at least every five years.)

== Constituency profile ==
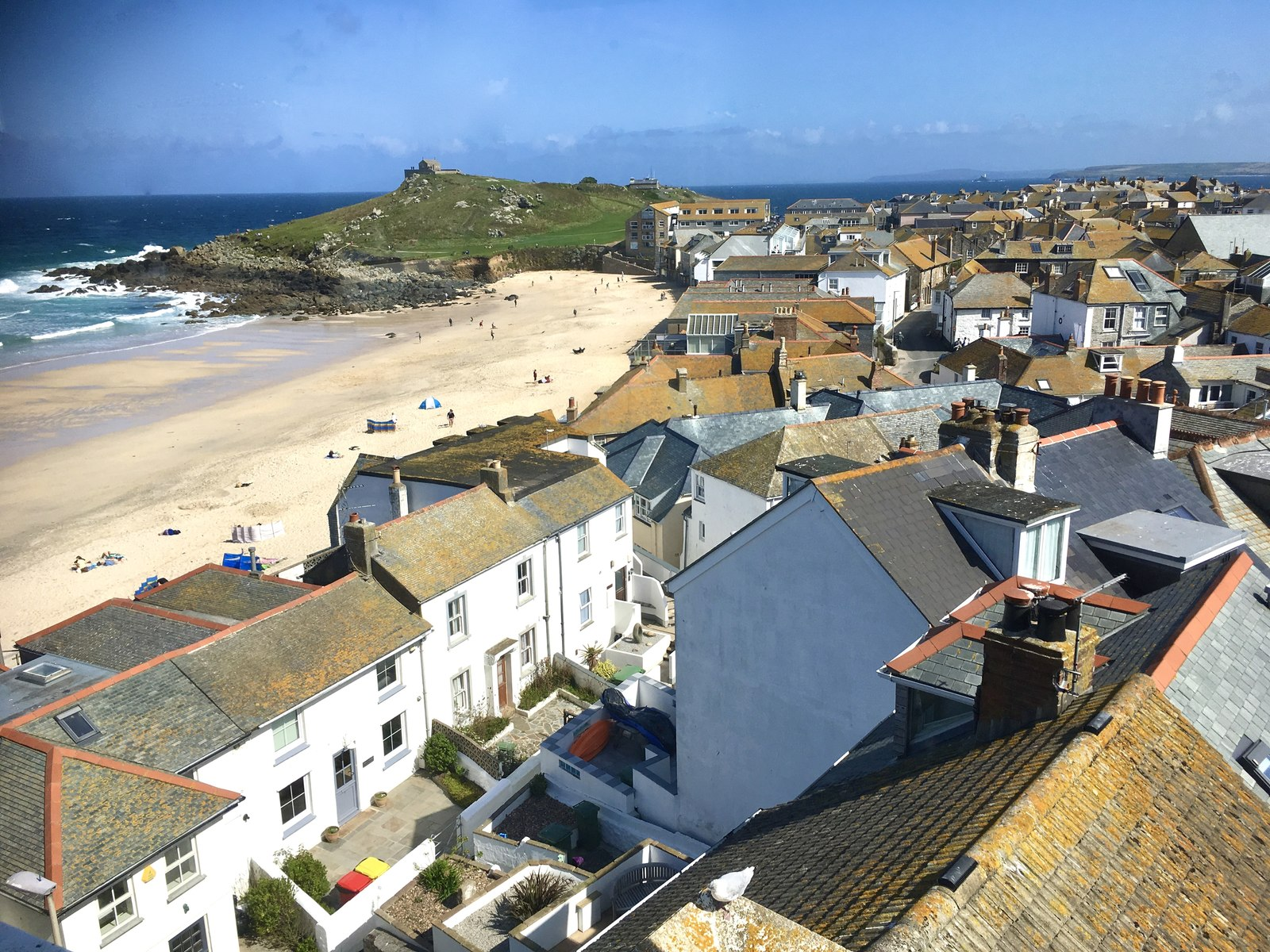
St Ives

St Ives (Cornish: Porthia) is a constituency in Cornwall in South West England. It is named after the town of St Ives, although its largest town is Penzance, which has a population of around 15,000. Other settlements include the towns of St Just in Penwith, Newlyn, Marazion, Porthleven and Helston and the village of Carbis Bay. The constituency also includes the Isles of Scilly which lie around 28 miles (45 km) off the coast.

St Ives is a mostly rural constituency with many small villages. It covers the south-western tip of Cornwall including the Lizard peninsula and Land's End, respectively the most southerly and westerly points in England. Many settlements in this constituency were historically reliant on tin mining. The coastal towns of St Ives, Penzance and Newlyn are traditionally fishing ports and are now seaside resort towns; this area is popular with tourists for its beaches and cliffs, and there are a large number of holiday parks here. The Isles of Scilly also have a significant tourism sector; the archipelago has its own council and is, on average, the warmest place in the UK. Most of the constituency has below-average levels of wealth; Penzance is especially deprived whilst Helston is comparatively affluent. Despite the deprivation here, house prices have been pushed up by the popularity of holiday homes, and the average price is similar to the UK average.

The St Ives constituency has low proportions of young and middle-aged adults and a large retired population. Residents have low rates of income, average levels of homeownership and above-average rates of child poverty. They have average levels of education and a high proportion work in the tourism, agriculture and retail sectors. The percentage of residents claiming unemployment benefits is below-average. White people made up 97% of the population at the 2021 census and around 20% of residents professed a Cornish national identity.

Most of the constituency is represented by Liberal Democrats at the local council, with some independents elected in the west. An estimated 53% of voters across the St Ives constituency supported leaving the European Union in the 2016 referendum, similar to the UK-wide figure of 52%.

== History ==
St Ives has elected MPs to every Parliament since 1558, except for a brief period during the Protectorate. It was originally a mere parliamentary borough that returned two MPs until the Great Reform Act 1832, when its representation was cut to a single member. In 1885 the borough was abolished, but the St Ives name was transferred to the surrounding county constituency.

=== St Ives borough ===
The borough established under Queen Mary consisted of the parish of St Ives in western Cornwall, a seaport and market town in which the main economic interests were fishing and the export of ores mined nearby. In 1831, the population of the borough was 4,776, and contained 1,002 houses.

The franchise was initially restricted to the town corporation, but after a judgment in a disputed election in 1702 the right to vote was given to all inhabitants paying scot and lot; in the early 19th century this amounted to a little over 300 voters. This was a wide franchise for the period, and its reasonable size meant that St Ives was one of the few Cornish boroughs that could claim not to be rotten.

Elections were usually contested. Local wealthiest families were able to exercise considerable influence on the outcome yet none was predominant. The result could rarely be taken for granted and it was necessary to court the voters assiduously. From the 17th century were three such families from the first: the Hobart family, (Note: Earls of Buckinghamshire from 1746.) the Praeds (at the time of Treventhoe manor), and the Dukes of Bolton (the Paulet family) (Note: Lord of a local manor.) – to which added by the mid 18th century the Stephens family. In 1751, however, John Stephens, who had previously allied himself with the Earl of Buckinghamshire (a Hobart) and managed the borough's elections on his behalf, "struck out on his own account" (defected independently) and secured the election of his son. Later in the decade Stephens and the Earl once more began to work together, but were unable to prevent Humphrey Mackworth Praed from establishing sufficient influence to sway one of the two seats.

By 1761 alliances coalesced, the Earl and Praed on one side nominating candidates against Stephens and the Duke of Bolton on the other. The by-election in 1763, when Buckinghamshire's brother-in-law Charles Hotham was re-elected after being appointed to a position in the Royal Household, cost the Earl £1,175 including 7 guineas each to 124 people, resulting in an uncontested election. (Note: Presumably paid to qualified voters, ensuring that it would be futile to contest here.)

There was a further bitterly contested election in 1774: allegations of bribery were investigated by a House of Commons committee, whose proceedings are recounted at length by the contemporary historian of electoral abuses, Thomas Oldfield. (Note: in his Representative History of Great Britain and Ireland.) Samuel Stephens, defeated by 7 votes, accused William Praed and Adam Drummond (the Duke of Bolton's candidate) of benefiting from several types of corruption. Humphrey Mackworth Praed, William's father, was said to have lent large sums to voters on the understanding that repayment would not be demanded if they voted for Praed and Drummond; but opposing counsel adduced evidence that Stephens had also resorted to bribery. However, it was alleged that many of Stephens' supporters had been prevented from voting, by rating them as not liable for scot and lot and so not eligible to vote; this disenfranchisement was a frequent abuse in such boroughs. His side, as petitioners, failed to bring any evidence of criminal misconduct by the parish overseers so the committee decided they had no jurisdiction to interfere. In the end, the committee upheld Drummond's election and declared that neither Stephens nor Praed had been properly elected, thus a writ was issued for a by-election to fill the second seat.

The cost of electioneering in St Ives seems eventually to have led to Buckinghamshire and Bolton withdrawing, and by 1784 Praed was considered unchallenged as patron. Nevertheless, Stephens' influence was not extinguished, and it was recorded that the patrons at the time of the Reform Act were Samuel Stephens of Tregarron and Sir Christopher Hawkins of Trewithan (who had purchased the manor of Mr Praed).

The Reform Act 1832 extended the boundaries, bringing in the neighbouring parishes of Lelant and Towednack and reduced the two St Ives seats to one. A new high of 584 voters qualified at the first reformed election, that of 1832.

On extension of the franchise in 1868 of the "Second Reform Act", the electorate never passed 1,500, and had fallen to barely 1,000 by the Redistribution of Seats Act 1885, the cornerstone of the third reform legislation, under which the "borough" for its parliamentary definition was abolished that year, the area becoming contributory to a larger county division.

=== St Ives county constituency ===
==== 1885–1918 ====
Division of counties into single-member constituencies was effected in 1885: Cornwall having six. The westernmost of these, in which St Ives stood, was formally The Western or St Ives Division of Cornwall but was most often referred to simply as St Ives or as West Cornwall.

This area included Penzance, Paul, Ludgvan and St Just, and stretched not only from Land's End to St Erth but also included the Isles of Scilly. This duchy seat was abnormally low in owner-occupiers, with many "nonconformist" Christians and the Conservatives were consequently very weak. However, local sentiment was strongly against Irish Home Rule or independence, seen as a particular threat to the livelihood of the fishermen and other maritime employees who made up much of the electorate, and St Ives therefore became a Liberal Unionist stronghold from 1886. (Note: Even though its MP from 1906, Sir Clifford Cory, was nominally a Liberal rather than a Unionist and stood against Liberal Unionists, he consistently stated his opposition to Irish Home Rule to voters at each election.)

==== 1918–present ====
After the boundary revisions introduced at the general election of 1918, which brought in most of the villages on the Lizard Peninsula (though not Helston), the constituency was simply called Cornwall, St Ives. It underwent further boundary changes in 1950, bringing Helston into the constituency, and in 1983, when it was extended to include all of the Penwith local government district.

The character of the constituency was little changed by any of these revisions, but party loyalties may have been disrupted by the 1918 changes. Labour put up a candidate for the first time in 1918, and took more than a third of the vote; at the next election, with Labour withdrawing and the Irish issue no longer able to help Cory, a Conservative was elected for the first time. For the next decade St Ives was a Conservative-Liberal marginal, changing hands four times in the 1920s. However, the formal split of National Liberals from the Liberals offered a popular compromise which suited the voters, so much so as to be a safe seat, and later for Conservatives when the National Liberals finally merged with them in the 1960s, until the formation of the Liberal Democrats re-invigorated the competition in the 1990s.

Having contested the seat in 1992 and reduced the Conservative majority to 2.8%, Andrew George captured the seat in 1997 for the Liberal Democrats after the retirement of the sitting Conservative MP, David Harris. George took over half the vote in both 2001 and 2005, but his majority was reduced in 2010, before he lost the seat to Conservative Derek Thomas in 2015. Having unsuccessfully attempted to recapture the constituency in 2017 and 2019, Andrew George won comfortably at the 2024 general election – the ninth time he had contested the seat over a period of 32 years.

=== Prominent members ===
==== 1885–date ====
Walter Runciman held the most senior positions in Education, Agriculture and Trade taking together the period from 1908 until 1916 during the Asquith ministry. He was later re-appointed as the most senior minister in Trade from 1931 to 1937 in the all-party National Coalition Government.

Sir John Nott also held the most senior position in the Trade department before becoming Secretary of State for Defence, including during the Argentine invasion of the Falkland Islands and the ensuing Falklands War. His assertion that he was cutting the defence budget before the war was not capricious and he offered his resignation to Margaret Thatcher, however she kept him for the duration of the conflict and he stood down in 1983.

=== Usual late count in modern elections ===
At general elections, the constituency is usually one of the last to declare a result – the delay in bringing the ballot boxes over from the Isles of Scilly means that counting does not begin until the following day. In the 2015 general election it was the last constituency in the United Kingdom to declare, because the ballot boxes were flown in from the Isles of Scilly only on the first scheduled flight the following morning, having been kept in police cells overnight on St Mary's, with the declaration taking place at 15:30 on Friday afternoon. However, in 1987 and 1992 the constituency did count during the night rather than the next day. The seat was declared at about 1:30 am in 1987 and about 3:45 am in 1992. In 2019 it was planned to fly the ballot boxes in overnight, but bad weather prevented this and the seat was the last to declare in the UK.

== Boundaries ==
=== Historic ===
Map of boundaries from 2010 to 2024 (Isles of Scilly not shown)

1885–1918: The Boroughs of St Ives and Penzance, the Sessional Division of West Penwith (including the Isles of Scilly), and the parishes of St Erth and Uny-Lelant.

1918–1950: The Boroughs of St Ives and Penzance, the Urban Districts of Ludgvan, Madron, Paul, and St Just, the Rural District of West Penwith, the Isles of Scilly, and part of the Rural District of Helston.

1950–1983: The Boroughs of St Ives, Penzance, and Helston, the Urban District of St Just, the Isles of Scilly, and parts of the Rural Districts of Kerrier and West Penwith.

1983–2010: The District of Penwith, the District of Kerrier wards of Breage and Germoe, Crowan, Grade-Ruan and Landewednack, Helston North, Helston South, Meneage, Mullion, Porthleven, St Keverne and Wendron, and Sithney, and the Isles of Scilly.

2010–2024: The District of Penwith wards of Goldsithney, Gulval and Heamoor, Lelant and Carbis Bay, Ludgvan and Towednack, Madron and Zennor, Marazion and Perranuthnoe, Morvah, Pendeen and St Just, Penzance Central, Penzance East, Penzance Promenade, Penzance South, St Buryan, St Erth and St Hilary, St Ives North, and St Ives South, the District of Kerrier wards of Breage and Crowan, Grade-Ruan and Landewednack, Helston North, Helston South, Meneage, Mullion, Porthleven and Sithney, and St Keverne, and the Isles of Scilly.

Following the Boundary Commission' Fifth Periodic Review of Westminster constituencies, Parliament increased the number of seats in the county from five to six for the 2010 general election, thus St Ives saw a loss of wards to the new Camborne and Redruth seat, including the St Ives Bay town of Hayle.

=== Current ===
Further to the 2023 review of Westminster constituencies which became effective for the 2024 general election, the constituency is composed of the following electoral divisions of Cornwall (as they existed on 4 May 2021):

- Crowan, Sithney & Wendron; Helston North; Helston South & Meneage; Land's End; Long Rock, Marazion & St Erth; Ludgvan, Madron, Gulval & Heamoor; Mousehole, Newlyn & St Buryan; Mullion & St Keverne; Penzance East; Penzance Promenade; Porthleven, Breage & Germoe; St Ives East, Lelant & Carbis Bay; St Ives West & Towednack; and
- The Isles of Scilly.

Minor changes to align with revised electoral division boundaries and bring the electorate within the permitted range.

The St Ives constituency covers the southwest of Cornwall, taking in the most southerly and westerly points of England (both its mainland and if islands are included), taking in parts of the former Penwith and Kerrier Districts. The main towns in the constituency are Penzance, St Ives and Helston. It also includes the Isles of Scilly, not shown on the map (having 1,700 electors out of a total of 63,000). The seat includes the Tate St Ives, St Michael's Mount (also an island) and Land's End.

== Members of Parliament ==
=== 1558–1629 ===
| Parliament of 1558 | Thomas Randolph | William Chambers |
| Parliament of 1559 | Robert Harrington | William Glasiour |
| Parliament of 1563–1567 | John Harrington (Note: Possibly this is John Harington (treasurer).) | William Glasiour |
| Parliament of 1571 | Thomas Clinton | John Newman |
| Parliament of 1572–1581 | Thomas Randolph | Edward Williams |
| Parliament of 1584–1585 | John James | Charles Blount (Note: The Dictionary of National Biography records that Blount was elected for Berealston, which he certainly represented in the following two Parliaments; but Browne Willis (whose information on the Parliament of 1584–5 Neale refers to as "fairly reliable") gives two other names for Berealston and lists Blount for St Ives.) |
| Parliament of 1586–1587 | Thomas Colby | John Morley |
| Parliament of 1588–1589 | Mark Steward | Henry Hobart |
| Parliament of 1593 | Noel Sotherton | Nicholas Saunders |
| Parliament of 1597–1598 | Noel Sotherton | Vincent Skinner |
| Parliament of 1601 | Thomas St Aubyn | Thomas Barton |
| Parliament of 1604–1611 | John Tregannon | William Brook |
| Addled Parliament (1614) | Sir Joseph Killigrew | Sir Anthony Maney also elected for Cirencester; Thomas Tindall |
| Parliament of 1621–1622 | Lord St John | Robert Bacon |
| Happy Parliament (1624–1625) | William Lake | Sir Francis Godolphin |
| Useless Parliament (1625) | Sir William Parkhurst | Sir Francis Godolphin |
| Parliament of 1625–1626 | Edward Savage | Benjamin Tichborne also elected for Petersfield; William Noy |
| Parliament of 1628–1629 | John Payne | Francis Godolphin |
No Parliament summoned 1629–1640

=== 1640–1832 ===
| Year | First member | First party | Second member | Second party |
|---|---|---|---|---|
| April 1640 | William Dell | | Sir Henry Marten | |
| November 1640 | Lord Lisle (Note: Lisle was also elected for Yarmouth (Isle of Wight), which he chose to represent, and did not sit for St Ives.) | Parliamentarian | Francis Godolphin | Parliamentarian |
| 1641 (?) | Edmund Waller | Royalist | Francis Godolphin | Parliamentarian |
| July 1643 | Waller disabled from sitting – seat vacant | | Francis Godolphin | Parliamentarian |
| 1647 | John Feilder | Recruiter | Francis Godolphin | Parliamentarian |
| December 1648 | John Feilder | Recruiter | Godolphin not recorded as sitting after Pride's Purge | |
| 1653 | St Ives was unrepresented in the Barebones Parliament and the First and Second Parliaments of the Protectorate | | | |
| January 1659 | John St Aubyn | | Peter Silly | |
| May 1659 | John Feilder | | One seat vacant | |
| May 1660 (Note: In April 1660, St Ives made a double return; on 5 May 1660, the Commons resolved "That John St Aubyn and James Praed, esqrs, being duly returned by the proper officers, they ought to sit".) | James Praed | | John St Aubyn | |
| July 1660 | Edward Nosworthy, senior | | John St Aubyn | |
| March 1661 | Edward Nosworthy, senior | | James Praed | |
| December 1661 | John Basset | | James Praed | |
| 1662 | Daniel O'Neill | | James Praed | |
| 1665 | Edward Nosworthy, senior | | James Praed | |
| 1679 | Edward Nosworthy, senior | | Edward Nosworthy, junior | |
| 1681 | James Praed | Tory | Edward Nosworthy, junior | |
| 1685 | Charles Davenant | Tory | James St. Amand | |
| 1689 | James Praed | Tory | Walter Vincent | Tory |
| 1690 | James Praed | Tory | William Harris | Whig |
| 1695 | James Praed | Tory | John Michell | |
| 1698 | James Praed | Tory | Sir Charles Wyndham | |
| January 1701 | James Praed | Tory | Benjamin Overton | |
| December 1701 | James Praed | Tory | Sir John Hawles | Whig |
| 1702 | James Praed | Tory | Richard Chaundler | |
| 1702 | James Praed | Tory | John Pitt | Tory |
| 1705 | Sir Bartholomew Gracedieu | | John Borlase | |
| 1708 | John Praed | Tory | John Borlase | |
| 1710 | John Praed | Tory | John Hopkins | Whig |
| 1713 | Sir William Pendarves | | John Hopkins | Whig |
| 1715 | Lord Harry Powlett | Whig | Sir John Hobart | |
| 1722 | Henry Knollys | | Sir John Hobart | |
| 1727 | Henry Knollys | | Major-General Sir Robert Rich | |
| 1734 | William Mackworth Praed | | Major-General Sir Robert Rich | |
| 1741 | John Bristow | | Lieutenant-Colonel Gregory Beake | |
| July 1747 | John Bristow | | Lord Hobart (Note: Hobart was also elected for Norwich, which he chose to represent, and never sat for St Ives.) | |
| December 1747 | John Bristow | | John Plumptre | |
| 1751 | John Bristow | | Samuel Stephens | |
| 1754 | Hon. George Hobart | | James Whitshed | |
| 1761 | Humphrey Mackworth Praed | | Colonel Charles Hotham | |
| 1768 | Thomas Durrant | | Adam Drummond | |
| 1774 | William Praed (Note: On petition, Praed was declared not to have been duly elected, and a by-election was held.) | | Adam Drummond | |
| 1775 | Thomas Wynn (Note: Created The Lord Newborough (in the Peerage of Ireland) in 1776.) | | Adam Drummond | |
| 1778 | Thomas Wynn | | Philip Dehany | |
| 1780 | William Praed | | Abel Smith | |
| 1784 | William Praed | | Richard Barwell | |
| 1790 | William Praed | | William Mills | |
| 1796 | William Praed | | Sir Richard Glyn | |
| 1802 | William Praed | | Jonathan Raine | |
| 1806 | Samuel Stephens | | Francis Horner | Whig |
| 1807 | Samuel Stephens | | Sir Walter Stirling, 1st Baronet | |
| 1812 | William Pole-Tylney-Long-Wellesley | Tory | Sir Walter Stirling, 1st Baronet | |
| 1818 | Samuel Stephens | | Sir Walter Stirling, 1st Baronet | |
| 1820 | Lyndon Evelyn | Tory | James Graham | Whig |
| 1821 | Lyndon Evelyn | Tory | Sir Christopher Hawkins, Bt | Tory |
| 1826 | James Halse | Tory | Sir Christopher Hawkins, Bt | Tory |
| 1828 | James Halse | Tory | Charles Arbuthnot | Tory |
| 1830 | William Pole-Tylney-Long-Wellesley | Ultra Tory | James Morrison | Whig |
| 1831 | James Halse | Tory | Edward Bulwer-Lytton | Whig |
| 1832 | Representation reduced to one member | | | |

=== 1832–1885 ===
| Election | Member | Party |
|---|---|---|
| 1832 | James Halse | Tory |
| 1834 | James Halse | Conservative |
| 1838 by-election | William Tyringham Praed | Conservative |
| 1846 by-election | Lord William Powlett | Conservative |
| 1852 | Robert Laffan | Peelite |
| 1857 | Henry Paull | Conservative |
| 1868 | Charles Magniac | Liberal |
| 1874 | Edward Davenport | Conservative |
| 1874 by-election | Charles Praed | Conservative |
| 1875 by-election | Charles Praed | Conservative |
| 1880 | Sir Charles Reed | Liberal |
| 1881 by-election | Charles Campbell Ross | Conservative |
| 1885 | Borough abolished; name transferred to county division | |

=== Since 1885 ===
| Election | Member | Party |
|---|---|---|
| 1885 | Sir John St Aubyn | Liberal |
| 1886 | Sir John St Aubyn | Liberal Unionist |
| 1887 by-election | Thomas Bedford Bolitho | Liberal Unionist |
| 1900 | Edward Hain | Liberal Unionist |
| 1904 | Edward Hain | Liberal |
| 1906 | Clifford Cory | Liberal |
| 1916 | Clifford Cory | Coalition Liberal |
| Jan 1922 | Clifford Cory | National Liberal |
| 1922 | Anthony Hawke | Conservative |
| 1923 | Clifford Cory | Liberal |
| 1924 | Anthony Hawke | Conservative |
| 1928 by-election | Hilda Runciman | Liberal |
| 1929 | Walter Runciman | Liberal |
| 1931 | Walter Runciman | National Liberal |
| 1937 by-election | Alec Beechman | National Liberal |
| 1950 | Greville Howard | National Liberal |
| 1966 | John Nott | National Liberal |
| 1968 | John Nott | Conservative |
| 1983 | David Harris | Conservative |
| 1997 | Andrew George | Liberal Democrat |
| 2015 | Derek Thomas | Conservative |
| 2024 | Andrew George | Liberal Democrat |

== Elections ==
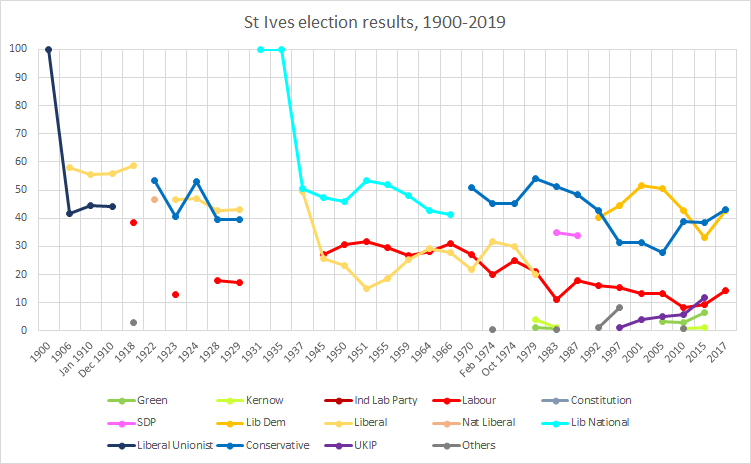
St Ives electoral history

=== Elections in the 2020s ===
General election 2024: St Ives
| Party | Candidate | Votes | % | ±% |
|---|---|---|---|---|
| Liberal Democrats | Andrew George | 25,033 | 52.0 | +12.7 |
| Conservative | Derek Thomas | 11,247 | 23.4 | –25.6 |
| Reform | Giane Mortimer | 6,492 | 13.5 | N/A |
| Labour | Filson Ali | 2,788 | 5.8 | –3.3 |
| Green | Ian Flindall | 1,797 | 3.7 | +1.9 |
| Independent | Dave Laity | 360 | 0.7 | N/A |
| Liberal | Paul Nicholson | 187 | 0.4 | –0.2 |
| UKIP | Jason Saunders | 111 | 0.2 | N/A |
| The Common People | John Harris | 91 | 0.2 | ±0.0 |
| Majority | | 13,786 | 28.6 | N/A |
| Turnout | | 48,106 | 68.7 | –8.2 |
| Registered electors | | 69,980 | | |
| Liberal Democrats gain from Conservative | | Swing | ▲19.1 | |

=== Elections in the 2010s ===
2019 notional result
| Party | Vote | % |
|---|---|---|
| Conservative | 26,403 | 49.0 |
| Liberal Democrats | 21,176 | 39.3 |
| Labour | 4,893 | 9.1 |
| Green | 981 | 1.8 |
| Others | 446 | 0.8 |
| Turnout | 53,899 | 76.9 |
| Electorate | 70,107 | |

General election 2019: St Ives
| Party | Candidate | Votes | % | ±% |
|---|---|---|---|---|
| Conservative | Derek Thomas | 25,365 | 49.3 | +6.1 |
| Liberal Democrats | Andrew George | 21,085 | 41.0 | −1.6 |
| Labour | Alana Bates | 3,553 | 6.9 | −7.4 |
| Green | Ian Flindall | 964 | 1.9 | N/A |
| Liberal | Robert Smith | 314 | 0.6 | N/A |
| Common People | John Harris | 132 | 0.3 | N/A |
| Majority | | 4,280 | 8.3 | +7.7 |
| Turnout | | 51,413 | 74.9 | −1.0 |
| Conservative hold | | Swing | +3.9 | |

General election 2017: St Ives
| Party | Candidate | Votes | % | ±% |
|---|---|---|---|---|
| Conservative | Derek Thomas | 22,120 | 43.2 | +4.9 |
| Liberal Democrats | Andrew George | 21,808 | 42.6 | +9.4 |
| Labour | Christopher Drew | 7,298 | 14.3 | +5.0 |
| Majority | | 312 | 0.6 | −4.5 |
| Turnout | | 51,226 | 75.9 | +2.2 |
| Conservative hold | | Swing | -2.3 | |

General election 2015: St Ives
| Party | Candidate | Votes | % | ±% |
|---|---|---|---|---|
| Conservative | Derek Thomas | 18,491 | 38.3 | −0.7 |
| Liberal Democrats | Andrew George | 16,022 | 33.2 | −9.5 |
| UKIP | Graham Calderwood | 5,720 | 11.8 | +6.2 |
| Labour | Cornelius Olivier | 4,510 | 9.3 | +1.1 |
| Green | Tim Andrewes | 3,051 | 6.3 | +3.5 |
| Mebyon Kernow | Rob Simmons | 518 | 1.1 | +0.3 |
| Majority | | 2,469 | 5.1 | N/A |
| Turnout | | 48,312 | 73.7 | +5.1 |
| Conservative gain from Liberal Democrats | | Swing | +4.5 | |

General election 2010: St Ives
| Party | Candidate | Votes | % | ±% |
|---|---|---|---|---|
| Liberal Democrats | Andrew George | 19,619 | 42.7 | −9.1 |
| Conservative | Derek Thomas | 17,900 | 39.0 | +11.7 |
| Labour | Philippa Latimer | 3,751 | 8.2 | −4.4 |
| UKIP | Michael Faulkner | 2,560 | 5.6 | +1.3 |
| Green | Tim Andrewes | 1,308 | 2.8 | −1.1 |
| Cornish Democrats | Johnathan Rogers | 396 | 0.9 | N/A |
| Mebyon Kernow | Simon Reed | 387 | 0.8 | N/A |
| Majority | | 1,719 | 3.7 | −19.3 |
| Turnout | | 45,921 | 68.6 | +0.8 |
| Registered electors | | 66,944 | | |
| Liberal Democrats hold | | Swing | -10.4 | |

=== Elections in the 2000s ===
General election 2005: St Ives
| Party | Candidate | Votes | % | ±% |
|---|---|---|---|---|
| Liberal Democrats | Andrew George | 25,577 | 50.7 | −0.9 |
| Conservative | Christian Mitchell | 13,968 | 27.7 | −3.5 |
| Labour | Michael Dooley | 6,583 | 13.1 | −0.2 |
| UKIP | Michael Faulkner | 2,551 | 5.1 | +2.2 |
| Green | Katrina Slack | 1,738 | 3.4 | N/A |
| Majority | | 11,609 | 23.0 | +2.6 |
| Turnout | | 50,417 | 72.4 | +6.1 |
| Registered electors | | 74,716 | | |
| Liberal Democrats hold | | Swing | +1.3 | |

General election 2001: St Ives
| Party | Candidate | Votes | % | ±% |
|---|---|---|---|---|
| Liberal Democrats | Andrew George | 25,413 | 51.6 | +7.1 |
| Conservative | Joanna Richardson | 15,360 | 31.2 | 0.0 |
| Labour | William Morris | 6,567 | 13.3 | −1.9 |
| UKIP | Michael Faulkner | 1,926 | 3.9 | +2.8 |
| Majority | | 10,053 | 20.4 | +7.1 |
| Turnout | | 49,266 | 66.3 | −8.9 |
| Registered electors | | 74,256 | | |
| Liberal Democrats hold | | Swing | -3.6 | |

=== Elections in the 1990s ===
General election 1997: St Ives
| Party | Candidate | Votes | % | ±% |
|---|---|---|---|---|
| Liberal Democrats | Andrew George | 23,966 | 44.5 | +4.4 |
| Conservative | William Rogers | 16,796 | 31.2 | −11.7 |
| Labour | Christopher Fegan | 8,184 | 15.2 | −0.8 |
| Referendum | Michael Faulkner | 3,714 | 6.9 | N/A |
| UKIP | Patricia Garnier | 567 | 1.1 | N/A |
| Liberal | Frederick Stephens | 425 | 0.8 | −0.2 |
| Independent | Kevin Lippiatt | 178 | 0.3 | N/A |
| Independent | William Hitchins | 71 | 0.1 | N/A |
| Majority | | 7,170 | 13.3 | N/A |
| Turnout | | 53,901 | 75.2 | −5.1 |
| Registered electors | | 71,680 | | |
| Liberal Democrats gain from Conservative | | Swing | +8.1 | |

General election 1992: St Ives
| Party | Candidate | Votes | % | ±% |
|---|---|---|---|---|
| Conservative | David Harris | 24,528 | 42.9 | −5.5 |
| Liberal Democrats | Andrew George | 22,883 | 40.1 | +6.3 |
| Labour | Stephen Warren | 9,144 | 16.0 | −1.8 |
| Liberal | Graham Stephens | 577 | 1.0 | N/A |
| Majority | | 1,645 | 2.8 | −11.8 |
| Turnout | | 57,132 | 80.3 | +3.1 |
| Registered electors | | 71,152 | | |
| Conservative hold | | Swing | | |

=== Elections in the 1980s ===
General election 1987: St Ives
| Party | Candidate | Votes | % | ±% |
|---|---|---|---|---|
| Conservative | David Harris | 25,174 | 48.4 | −3.0 |
| SDP | Hugh Carter | 17,619 | 33.8 | −1.0 |
| Labour | Ian Hope | 9,275 | 17.8 | +6.6 |
| Majority | | 7,555 | 14.6 | −2.0 |
| Turnout | | 52,059 | 77.2 | +3.3 |
| Registered electors | | 67,448 | | |
| Conservative hold | | Swing | | |

General election 1983: St Ives
| Party | Candidate | Votes | % | ±% |
|---|---|---|---|---|
| Conservative | David Harris | 24,297 | 51.4 | −2.6 |
| SDP | Hugh Carter | 16,438 | 34.8 | +14.7 |
| Labour | Mary Crowley | 5,310 | 11.2 | −9.7 |
| Mebyon Kernow | Pedyr Prior | 569 | 1.2 | −2.8 |
| Ecology | H. Hoptrough | 439 | 0.9 | −0.1 |
| Independent | W.N.A. Horner | 219 | 0.5 | N/A |
| Majority | | 7,859 | 16.6 | −16.5 |
| Turnout | | 47,272 | 73.9 | −3.1 |
| Registered electors | | 64,012 | | |
| Conservative hold | | Swing | | |

=== Elections in the 1970s ===
General election 1979: St Ives
| Party | Candidate | Votes | % | ±% |
|---|---|---|---|---|
| Conservative | John Nott | 22,352 | 54.0 | +8.6 |
| Labour | Richard Evans | 8,636 | 20.9 | −3.9 |
| Liberal | J. Cotton | 8,299 | 20.1 | −9.7 |
| Mebyon Kernow | Colin Murley | 1,662 | 4.0 | N/A |
| Ecology | H. Hoptrough | 427 | 1.0 | N/A |
| Majority | | 13,716 | 33.1 | +17.7 |
| Turnout | | 41,376 | 77.0 | +3.3 |
| Registered electors | | 53,715 | | |
| Conservative hold | | Swing | | |

General election October 1974: St Ives
| Party | Candidate | Votes | % | ±% |
|---|---|---|---|---|
| Conservative | John Nott | 17,198 | 45.4 | +0.3 |
| Liberal | Terence Tonkin | 11,330 | 29.8 | −1.9 |
| Labour | Bruce Tidy | 9,388 | 24.8 | +4.7 |
| Majority | | 5,868 | 15.4 | +2.0 |
| Turnout | | 37,916 | 73.7 | −5.7 |
| Registered electors | | 51,440 | | |
| Conservative hold | | Swing | | |

General election February 1974: St Ives
| Party | Candidate | Votes | % | ±% |
|---|---|---|---|---|
| Conservative | John Nott | 18,290 | 45.1 | −5.8 |
| Liberal | Terence Tonkin | 12,865 | 31.7 | +9.8 |
| Labour | Bruce Tidy | 9,231 | 20.1 | −7.1 |
| Independent | G. T. Taylor | 177 | 0.4 | N/A |
| Majority | | 5,425 | 13.4 | −10.3 |
| Turnout | | 40,561 | 79.4 | +4.3 |
| Registered electors | | 51,092 | | |
| Conservative hold | | Swing | | |

General election 1970: St Ives
| Party | Candidate | Votes | % | ±% |
|---|---|---|---|---|
| Conservative | John Nott | 18,581 | 50.9 | +9.6 |
| Labour | Maureen Castle | 9,913 | 27.2 | −3.8 |
| Liberal | Howard Levett Fry | 7,981 | 21.9 | −5.8 |
| Majority | | 8,688 | 23.7 | +13.4 |
| Turnout | | 36,476 | 75.1 | −2.8 |
| Registered electors | | 48,063 | | |
| Conservative hold | | Swing | +6.7 | |

=== Elections in the 1960s ===
General election 1966: St Ives
| Party | Candidate | Votes | % | ±% |
|---|---|---|---|---|
| National Liberal | John Nott | 14,312 | 41.3 | −1.3 |
| Labour | Thomas F. G. Jones | 10,713 | 31.0 | +2.9 |
| Liberal | John C. T. Trewin | 9,593 | 27.7 | −1.6 |
| Majority | | 3,599 | 10.3 | −3.0 |
| Turnout | | 34,620 | 77.9 | +2.8 |
| Registered electors | | 44,419 | | |
| National Liberal hold | | Swing | -2.1 | |

General election 1964: St Ives
| Party | Candidate | Votes | % | ±% |
|---|---|---|---|---|
| National Liberal | Greville Howard | 14,040 | 42.6 | −5.3 |
| Liberal | Gerald Edward Leaman Whitmarsh | 9,641 | 29.3 | +4.1 |
| Labour | Thomas F. G. Jones | 9,265 | 28.1 | +1.2 |
| Majority | | 4,399 | 13.3 | −7.7 |
| Turnout | | 32,946 | 75.1 | +0.7 |
| Registered electors | | 43,890 | | |
| National Liberal hold | | Swing | -4.7 | |

=== Elections in the 1950s ===
General election 1959: St Ives
| Party | Candidate | Votes | % | ±% |
|---|---|---|---|---|
| National Liberal | Greville Howard | 15,700 | 47.9 | −4.1 |
| Labour | Duncan Longden | 8,802 | 26.9 | −2.8 |
| Liberal | Gerald Edward Leaman Whitmarsh | 8,258 | 25.2 | +6.6 |
| Majority | | 6,898 | 21.0 | −1.3 |
| Turnout | | 32,760 | 74.4 | +0.5 |
| Registered electors | | 44,010 | | |
| National Liberal hold | | Swing | -0.7 | |

General election 1955: St Ives
| Party | Candidate | Votes | % | ±% |
|---|---|---|---|---|
| National Liberal | Greville Howard | 17,063 | 52.0 | −1.3 |
| Labour | Leslie Statton Pawley | 9,728 | 29.7 | −2.1 |
| Liberal | Desmond Banks | 6,020 | 18.6 | +3.7 |
| Majority | | 7,335 | 22.3 | +0.7 |
| Turnout | | 32,811 | 73.9 | −4.8 |
| Registered electors | | 44,374 | | |
| National Liberal hold | | Swing | +0.4 | |

General election 1951: St Ives
| Party | Candidate | Votes | % | ±% |
|---|---|---|---|---|
| National Liberal | Greville Howard | 18,828 | 53.3 | +7.3 |
| Labour Co-op | Arthur Maddison | 11,216 | 31.8 | +1.1 |
| Liberal | John Denis Gilbert Kellock | 5,273 | 14.9 | −8.4 |
| Majority | | 7,612 | 21.6 | +6.3 |
| Turnout | | 35,317 | 78.7 | −2.9 |
| Registered electors | | 44,885 | | |
| National Liberal hold | | Swing | +3.1 | |

General election 1950: St Ives
| Party | Candidate | Votes | % | ±% |
|---|---|---|---|---|
| National Liberal | Greville Howard | 16,653 | 46.0 | −1.3 |
| Labour | Peter Shore | 11,118 | 30.7 | +3.5 |
| Liberal | Eric Farquhar Allison | 8,421 | 23.3 | −2.2 |
| Majority | | 5,535 | 15.3 | −4.8 |
| Turnout | | 36,192 | 81.6 | +11.0 |
| Registered electors | | 44,342 | | |
| National Liberal hold | | Swing | | |

=== Elections in the 1940s ===
General election 1945: St Ives
| Party | Candidate | Votes | % | ±% |
|---|---|---|---|---|
| National Liberal | Alec Beechman | 14,256 | 47.3 | −3.1 |
| Labour | Henry Brinton | 8,190 | 27.2 | N/A |
| Liberal | Eric Farquhar Allison | 7,692 | 25.5 | −24.1 |
| Majority | | 6,066 | 20.1 | +19.3 |
| Turnout | | 30,138 | 70.6 | +4.5 |
| Registered electors | | 42,706 | | |
| National Liberal hold | | Swing | N/A | |

General election 1939–40: Another general election was required to take place before the end of 1940. The political parties had been making preparations for an election to take place from 1939 and by the end of this year, the following candidates had been selected;

- Liberal National: Alec Beechman
- Liberal:
- Labour:

=== Elections in the 1930s ===
1937 St Ives by-election
| Party | Candidate | Votes | % | ±% |
|---|---|---|---|---|
| National Liberal | Alec Beechman | 13,044 | 50.4 | N/A |
| Liberal | Isaac Foot | 12,834 | 49.6 | N/A |
| Majority | | 210 | 0.8 | N/A |
| Turnout | | 25,878 | 66.1 | N/A |
| Registered electors | | 39,149 | | |
| National Liberal hold | | Swing | | |

General election 1935: St. Ives
| Party | Candidate | Votes | % | ±% |
|---|---|---|---|---|
| National Liberal | Walter Runciman | Unopposed | | |
| Registered electors | | 39,378 | | |
| National Liberal hold | | | | |

General election 1931: St. Ives
| Party | Candidate | Votes | % | ±% |
|---|---|---|---|---|
| National Liberal | Walter Runciman | Unopposed | | |
| Registered electors | | 38,230 | | |
| National Liberal hold | | | | |

=== Elections in the 1920s ===
General election 1929: St Ives
| Party | Candidate | Votes | % | ±% |
|---|---|---|---|---|
| Liberal | Walter Runciman | 12,443 | 43.2 | +0.6 |
| Unionist | Andrew Caird | 11,411 | 39.7 | +0.3 |
| Labour | William Edward Arnold-Forster | 4,920 | 17.1 | −0.9 |
| Majority | | 1,032 | 3.5 | +0.3 |
| Turnout | | 28,764 | 76.5 | −0.9 |
| Registered electors | | 37,593 | | |
| Liberal hold | | Swing | +0.2 | |

1928 St Ives by-election: St Ives
| Party | Candidate | Votes | % | ±% |
|---|---|---|---|---|
| Liberal | Hilda Runciman | 10,241 | 42.6 | −4.4 |
| Unionist | Andrew Caird | 9,478 | 39.4 | −13.6 |
| Labour | Frederick Jesse Hopkins | 4,343 | 18.0 | N/A |
| Majority | | 763 | 3.2 | N/A |
| Turnout | | 24,062 | 77.4 | +8.3 |
| Registered electors | | 31,096 | | |
| Liberal gain from Unionist | | Swing | +4.6 | |

General election 1924: St Ives
| Party | Candidate | Votes | % | ±% |
|---|---|---|---|---|
| Unionist | Anthony Hawke | 11,159 | 53.0 | +12.4 |
| Liberal | Clifford Cory | 9,912 | 47.0 | +0.5 |
| Majority | | 1,247 | 6.0 | N/A |
| Turnout | | 21,071 | 69.1 | −2.3 |
| Registered electors | | 30,512 | | |
| Unionist gain from Liberal | | Swing | +6.0 | |

General election 1923: St Ives
| Party | Candidate | Votes | % | ±% |
|---|---|---|---|---|
| Liberal | Clifford Cory | 9,922 | 46.5 | 0.0 |
| Unionist | Anthony Hawke | 8,652 | 40.6 | −12.9 |
| Labour | Albert Dunn | 2,749 | 12.9 | N/A |
| Majority | | 1,270 | 5.9 | 12.9 |
| Turnout | | 21,323 | 71.4 | +5.8 |
| Registered electors | | 29,877 | | |
| Liberal gain from Unionist | | Swing | +6.5 | |

General election 1922: St Ives
| Party | Candidate | Votes | % | ±% |
|---|---|---|---|---|
| Unionist | Anthony Hawke | 10,388 | 53.5 | N/A |
| National Liberal | Clifford Cory | 9,016 | 46.5 | −12.1 |
| Majority | | 1,372 | 7.0 | N/A |
| Turnout | | 19,404 | 65.6 | +13.9 |
| Registered electors | | 29,561 | | |
| Unionist gain from National Liberal | | Swing | N/A | |

=== Elections in the 1910s ===
General election 1918: St Ives
| Party | | Candidate | Votes | % | ±% |
|---|---|---|---|---|---|
| C | National Liberal | Clifford Cory | 8,659 | 58.6 | +2.6 |
| | Labour | Albert Dunn | 5,659 | 38.4 | N/A |
| | Ind. Unionist | Thomas Francis Tregoy Mitchell | 436 | 3.0 | N/A |
| Majority | | | 3,000 | 20.2 | +8.2 |
| Turnout | | | 14,754 | 51.7 | –29.0 |
| Registered electors | | | 28,537 | | |
| | National Liberal hold | | Swing | N/A | |
C indicates candidate endorsed by the coalition government.

General election 1914–15: Another general election was required to take place before the end of 1915. The political parties had been making preparations for an election to take place and by July 1914, the following candidates had been selected;

- Liberal: Clifford Cory
- Unionist: Anthony Hawke

General election December 1910: St Ives
| Party | Candidate | Votes | % | ±% |
|---|---|---|---|---|
| Liberal | Clifford Cory | 4,253 | 56.0 | +0.6 |
| Liberal Unionist | Roland Edmund Lomax Vaughan-Williams | 3,338 | 44.0 | −0.6 |
| Majority | | 915 | 12.0 | +1.2 |
| Turnout | | 7,591 | 80.7 | −4.8 |
| Registered electors | | 9,411 | | |
| Liberal hold | | Swing | +0.6 | |

General election January 1910: St Ives
| Party | Candidate | Votes | % | ±% |
|---|---|---|---|---|
| Liberal | Clifford Cory | 4,458 | 55.4 | −2.8 |
| Liberal Unionist | Cecil Levita | 3,586 | 44.6 | +2.8 |
| Majority | | 872 | 10.8 | −5.6 |
| Turnout | | 8,044 | 85.5 | +4.3 |
| Registered electors | | 9,411 | | |
| Liberal hold | | Swing | -2.8 | |

=== Elections in the 1900s ===
Clifford Cory

General election 1906: St Ives
| Party | Candidate | Votes | % | ±% |
|---|---|---|---|---|
| Liberal | Clifford Cory | 4,244 | 58.2 | N/A |
| Liberal Unionist | Philip Pilditch | 3,052 | 41.8 | N/A |
| Majority | | 1,192 | 16.4 | N/A |
| Turnout | | 7,296 | 81.2 | N/A |
| Registered electors | | 8,980 | | |
| Liberal gain from Liberal Unionist | | Swing | N/A | |

General election 1900: St Ives
| Party | Candidate | Votes | % | ±% |
|---|---|---|---|---|
| Liberal Unionist | Edward Hain | Unopposed | | |
| Registered electors | | 8,369 | | |
| Liberal Unionist hold | | | | |

=== Elections in the 1890s ===
General election 1895: St Ives
| Party | Candidate | Votes | % | ±% |
|---|---|---|---|---|
| Liberal Unionist | Thomas Bedford Bolitho | Unopposed | | |
| Registered electors | | 7,569 | | |
| Liberal Unionist hold | | | | |

General election 1892: St Ives
| Party | Candidate | Votes | % | ±% |
|---|---|---|---|---|
| Liberal Unionist | Thomas Bedford Bolitho | Unopposed | | |
| Registered electors | | 7,130 | | |
| Liberal Unionist hold | | | | |

=== Elections in the 1880s ===
By-election, 9 July 1887: St Ives
| Party | Candidate | Votes | % | ±% |
|---|---|---|---|---|
| Liberal Unionist | Thomas Bedford Bolitho | Unopposed | | |
| Liberal Unionist hold | | | | |

- Caused by St. Aubyn's elevation to the peerage, becoming Lord St. Levan.

General election 1886: St Ives
| Party | Candidate | Votes | % | ±% |
|---|---|---|---|---|
| Liberal Unionist | John St Aubyn | 3,395 | 79.3 | +35.6 |
| Liberal | Samuel Barrow | 888 | 20.7 | −35.6 |
| Majority | | 2,507 | 58.6 | N/A |
| Turnout | | 4,283 | 56.3 | −21.1 |
| Registered electors | | 7,606 | | |
| Liberal Unionist gain from Liberal | | Swing | +35.6 | |

General election 1885: St Ives
| Party | Candidate | Votes | % | ±% |
|---|---|---|---|---|
| Liberal | John St Aubyn | 3,313 | 56.3 | +3.7 |
| Conservative | Charles Campbell Ross | 2,576 | 43.7 | −3.7 |
| Majority | | 737 | 12.6 | +7.4 |
| Turnout | | 5,889 | 77.4 | −4.2 |
| Registered electors | | 7,606 | | |
| Liberal hold | | Swing | +3.7 | |

By-election, 13 April 1881: St Ives
| Party | Candidate | Votes | % | ±% |
|---|---|---|---|---|
| Conservative | Charles Campbell Ross | 462 | 56.2 | +8.8 |
| Liberal | William Cole Pendarves | 360 | 43.8 | −8.8 |
| Majority | | 102 | 12.4 | N/A |
| Turnout | | 822 | 81.2 | −0.4 |
| Registered electors | | 1,012 | | |
| Conservative gain from Liberal | | Swing | +8.8 | |

- Caused by Reed's death.

General election 1880: St Ives
| Party | Candidate | Votes | % | ±% |
|---|---|---|---|---|
| Liberal | Charles Reed | 487 | 52.6 | +16.1 |
| Conservative | Charles Campbell Ross | 439 | 47.4 | −16.1 |
| Majority | | 48 | 5.2 | N/A |
| Turnout | | 926 | 81.6 | −1.1 |
| Registered electors | | 1,135 | | |
| Liberal gain from Conservative | | Swing | +16.1 | |

=== Elections in the 1870s ===
1875 St Ives by-election
| Party | Candidate | Votes | % | ±% |
|---|---|---|---|---|
| Conservative | Charles Praed | 658 | 54.5 | −9.0 |
| Liberal | Francis Lycett | 550 | 45.5 | +9.0 |
| Majority | | 108 | 9.0 | −18.0 |
| Turnout | | 1,208 | 85.7 | +3.0 |
| Registered electors | | 1,410 | | |
| Conservative hold | | Swing | -9.0 | |

- Caused by the previous by-election being declared void on petition, on grounds of "general treating".

By-election, 30 December 1874: St Ives
| Party | Candidate | Votes | % | ±% |
|---|---|---|---|---|
| Conservative | Charles Praed | 617 | 52.8 | −10.7 |
| Liberal | Francis Lycett | 552 | 47.2 | +10.7 |
| Majority | | 65 | 5.6 | −21.4 |
| Turnout | | 1,169 | 81.7 | −1.0 |
| Registered electors | | 1,430 | | |
| Conservative hold | | Swing | −10.7 | |

- Caused by Davenport's death.

General election 1874: St Ives
| Party | Candidate | Votes | % | ±% |
|---|---|---|---|---|
| Conservative | Edward Davenport | 751 | 63.5 | N/A |
| Liberal | John Bedford Bolitho | 432 | 36.5 | N/A |
| Majority | | 319 | 27.0 | N/A |
| Turnout | | 1,183 | 82.7 | N/A |
| Registered electors | | 1,430 | | |
| Conservative gain from Liberal | | Swing | N/A | |

=== Elections in the 1860s ===
General election 1868: St Ives
| Party | Candidate | Votes | % | ±% |
|---|---|---|---|---|
| Liberal | Charles Magniac | Unopposed | | |
| Registered electors | | 1,398 | | |
| Liberal gain from Conservative | | | | |

General election 1865: St Ives
| Party | Candidate | Votes | % | ±% |
|---|---|---|---|---|
| Conservative | Henry Paull | 233 | 56.8 | −9.6 |
| Liberal | Edward Vivian | 177 | 43.2 | +9.6 |
| Majority | | 56 | 13.6 | −19.2 |
| Turnout | | 410 | 84.4 | +10.3 |
| Registered electors | | 486 | | |
| Conservative hold | | Swing | −9.6 | |

=== Elections in the 1850s ===
General election 1859: St Ives
| Party | Candidate | Votes | % | ±% |
|---|---|---|---|---|
| Conservative | Henry Paull | 257 | 66.4 | N/A |
| Liberal | Charles Frederick Giesler | 130 | 33.6 | N/A |
| Majority | | 127 | 32.8 | N/A |
| Turnout | | 387 | 74.1 | N/A |
| Registered electors | | 522 | | |
| Conservative hold | | Swing | N/A | |

General election 1857: St Ives
| Party | Candidate | Votes | % | ±% |
|---|---|---|---|---|
| Conservative | Henry Paull | Unopposed | | |
| Registered electors | | 536 | | |
| Conservative gain from Peelite | | | | |

General election 1852: St Ives
| Party | Candidate | Votes | % | ±% |
|---|---|---|---|---|
| Peelite | Robert Laffan | 256 | 52.0 | N/A |
| Conservative | Henry Paull | 218 | 44.3 | −20.7 |
| Radical | Philip Edward Barnes | 18 | 3.7 | N/A |
| Majority | | 38 | 7.7 | N/A |
| Turnout | | 492 | 85.1 | +17.3 |
| Registered electors | | 578 | | |
| Peelite gain from Conservative | | Swing | N/A | |

=== Elections in the 1840s ===
General election 1847: St Ives
| Party | Candidate | Votes | % | ±% |
|---|---|---|---|---|
| Conservative | William Powlett | 262 | 65.0 | +14.6 |
| Conservative | Peter Borthwick | 141 | 35.0 | −14.6 |
| Majority | | 121 | 30.0 | +29.2 |
| Turnout | | 403 | 67.8 | −22.2 |
| Registered electors | | 594 | | |
| Conservative hold | | Swing | +14.6 | |

By-election, 21 July 1846: St Ives
| Party | Candidate | Votes | % | ±% |
|---|---|---|---|---|
| Conservative | William Powlett | Unopposed | | |
| Conservative hold | | | | |

- Caused by Praed's death.

General election 1841: St Ives
| Party | Candidate | Votes | % | ±% |
|---|---|---|---|---|
| Conservative | William Tyringham Praed | 272 | 50.4 | +5.3 |
| Conservative | Edwin Ley | 268 | 49.6 | −5.3 |
| Majority | | 4 | 0.8 | −9.0 |
| Turnout | | 540 | 90.0 | +4.5 |
| Registered electors | | 600 | | |
| Conservative hold | | Swing | +5.3 | |

=== Elections in the 1830s ===
By-election, 24 May 1838: St Ives
| Party | Candidate | Votes | % | ±% |
|---|---|---|---|---|
| Conservative | William Tyringham Praed | 256 | 50.8 | +5.7 |
| Conservative | Francis Hearle Stephens | 248 | 49.2 | −5.7 |
| Majority | | 8 | 1.6 | −8.2 |
| Turnout | | 504 | 86.0 | +0.5 |
| Registered electors | | 586 | | |
| Conservative hold | | Swing | +5.7 | |

- Caused by Halse's death

General election 1837: St Ives
| Party | Candidate | Votes | % |
|---|---|---|---|
| Conservative | James Halse | 272 | 54.9 |
| Conservative | William Tyringham Praed | 223 | 45.1 |
| Majority | | 49 | 9.8 |
| Turnout | | 495 | 85.5 |
| Registered electors | | 579 | |
| Conservative hold | | | |

General election 1835: St Ives
| Party | Candidate | Votes | % |
|---|---|---|---|
| Conservative | James Halse | Unopposed | |
| Registered electors | | 599 | |
| Conservative hold | | | |

General election 1832: St Ives
| Party | Candidate | Votes | % |
|---|---|---|---|
| Tory | James Halse | 302 | 59.3 |
| Tory | William Mackworth Praed | 168 | 33.0 |
| Tory | Henry Lewis Stephens | 39 | 7.7 |
| Majority | | 134 | 26.3 |
| Turnout | | 509 | 87.2 |
| Registered electors | | 584 | |
| Tory hold | | | |

General election 1831: St Ives
| Party | Candidate | Votes | % |
|---|---|---|---|
| Tory | James Halse | Unopposed | |
| Whig | Edward Lytton Bulwer | Unopposed | |
| Registered electors | | c. 499 | |
| Tory hold | | | |
| Whig hold | | | |

General election 1830: St Ives
| Party | Candidate | Votes | % | ±% |
|---|---|---|---|---|
| Tory | William Pole-Tylney-Long-Wellesley | 217 | 39.5 | |
| Whig | James Morrison | 181 | 33.0 | |
| Tory | James Halse | 151 | 27.5 | |
| Turnout | | 316 | c. 63.3 | |
| Registered electors | | c. 499 | | |
| Majority | | 36 | 6.5 | |
| Tory hold | | Swing | | |
| Majority | | 30 | 5.5 | N/A |
| Whig gain from Tory | | Swing | | |

== See also ==
- parliamentary constituencies in Cornwall

== Sources ==
- F. W. S. Craig, British Parliamentary Election Results 1832 – 1885
- F. W. S. Craig, British Parliamentary Election Results 1885 – 1918
- Election results, 1950 – 2005
- Robert Beatson, A Chronological Register of Both Houses of Parliament (London: Longman, Hurst, Res & Orme, 1807) A Chronological Register of Both Houses of the British Parliament, from the Union in 1708, to the Third Parliament of the United Kingdom of Great Britain and Ireland, in 1807
- D. Brunton & D. H. Pennington, Members of the Long Parliament (London: George Allen & Unwin, 1954)
- Cobbett's Parliamentary history of England, from the Norman Conquest in 1066 to the year 1803 (London: Thomas Hansard, 1808) titles A-Z
- Michael Kinnear, The British Voter (London: BH Batsford, Ltd, 1968)
- Lewis Namier & John Brooke, The History of Parliament: The House of Commons 1754–1790 (London: HMSO, 1964)
- J. E. Neale, The Elizabethan House of Commons (London: Jonathan Cape, 1949)
- T. H. B. Oldfield, The Representative History of Great Britain and Ireland (London: Baldwin, Cradock & Joy, 1816)
- Henry Pelling, Social Geography of British Elections 1885–1910 (London: Macmillan, 1967)
- J Holladay Philbin, Parliamentary Representation 1832 – England and Wales (New Haven: Yale University Press, 1965)
- Edward Porritt and Annie G. Porritt, The Unreformed House of Commons (Cambridge University Press, 1903)
- Willis, Browne (1750). Notitia Parliamentaria, Part II: A Series or Lists of the Representatives in the several Parliaments held from the Reformation 1541, to the Restoration 1660 ... London. p. 1.
- Frederic A. Youngs Jr., Guide to the Local Administrative Units of England, Vol I (London: Royal Historical Society, 1979)
