= Parliamentary constituencies in Cornwall =

The ceremonial county of Cornwall, which includes the Isles of Scilly, is divided into six parliamentary constituencies. They are all county constituencies.

== Parliamentary history of Cornwall ==
Four of the six Cornish parliamentary seats are currently held by Labour, a party that had no seats in Cornwall between the 2005 and 2024 general elections. Two are held by the Liberal Democrats since the 2024 election, after previously winning all the Cornish constituencies in 2005 then losing three to the Conservatives in 2010, and losing the remaining three to the Conservatives in 2015. The Conservatives, who had won no Cornish seats in 1997, 2001 and 2005, held three from 2010 and all six from 2015 to 2024. In 2017, several previous Liberal Democrat candidates, including previous MPs Andrew George and Steve Gilbert stood in their old seats, but failed to be re-elected. In all six seats, the Labour vote surged, pushing the Liberal Democrats into third place in four of the six seats. In the 2019 election, Labour retained their position as the second-placed party in most of the Cornish seats, with their vote holding up far better in the region than elsewhere in the country.

In the 2024 election, the Conservatives lost all six seats, four of them going to Labour and the other two going to the Liberal Democrats, with Andrew George (MP for St Ives 1997–2015) retaking his St Ives seat for the first time since 2015 – George has stood in his St Ives constituency in every election since 1992, winning in six out of nine elections. This marked the first time since 2005 that the Conservatives held no seats in Cornwall, the first time since 2015 that the Liberal Democrats held any seats, and the first time since 2005 that the Labour Party held any seats. It is also the first time in history that the Labour Party has held a majority of Cornish seats, as well as the most seats they have ever gained there, previously only holding one seat in a number of elections, and thus is their best result in Cornwall ever. Reform UK failed to win any seats in Cornwall but came third in five out of six seats and fourth in the remaining seat, while the Green Party came fifth in all six seats and increased their vote share in all seats.

== Constituencies ==
Labour † Conservative ‡ Liberal Democrat ¤ Independent §

Constituency	Electorate	Majority (Note: The majority is the number of votes the winning candidate receives more than their nearest rival.)	Member of Parliament	Nearest opposition	Current electoral wards	Map
Camborne and Redruth	74,382	7,806	Perran Moon §	Connor Donnithorne ‡	Camborne Roskear & Tuckingmill; Camborne Trelowarren; Camborne West & Treswithian; Constantine, Mabe & Mawnan; Crowan, Sithney & Wendron (part); Falmouth Trescobeas & Budock (part); Four Lanes, Beacon & Troon; Gwinear-Gwithian & Hayle East; Hayle West; Helston South & Meneage (part); Illogan & Portreath; Lanner, Stithians & Gwennap (part); Mylor, Perranarworthal & Ponsanooth (part); Perranporth (part); Pool & Tehidy; Redruth Central, Carharrack & St Day; Redruth North; Redruth South; St Agnes (part)	A small constituency. It is situated in the south west of the county, although it borders another constituency located further south west.
North Cornwall	76,741	10,767	Ben Maguire ¤	Scott Mann ‡	Altarnun & Stoke Climsland; Bodmin St Mary's & St Leonard; Bodmin St Petroc; Bude; Camelford & Boscastle; Lanivet, Blisland & Bodmin St Lawrence; Launceston North & North Petherwin; Launceston South; Padstow; Poundstock; St Teath & Tintagel; Stratton, Kilkhampton & Morwenstow; Wadebridge East & St Minver; Wadebridge West & St Mabyn	A large constituency in the north of the county.
South East Cornwall	72,654	1,911	Anna Gelderd †	Sheryll Murray ‡	Callington & St Dominic; Calstock; Liskeard Central; Liskeard South & Dobwalls; Looe East & Deviock; Looe West, Pelynt, Lansallos & Lanteglos; Lostwithiel & Lanreath; Lynher; Rame Peninsula & St Germans; Roche & Bugle (part); Saltash Essa; Saltash Tamar; Saltash Trematon & Landrake; St Cleer & Menheniot; Torpoint	A medium-sized constituency found in the south east of the county.
St Austell and Newquay	76,076	2,470	Noah Law †	Steve Double ‡	Fowey, Tywardreath & Par; Mevagissey & St Austell Bay; Newquay Central & Pentire; Newquay Porth & Tretherras; Newquay Trenance; Penwithick & Boscoppa; Roche & Bugle (part); St Austell Bethel & Holmbush; St Austell Central & Gover; St Austell Poltair & Mount Charles; St Blazey; St Columb Major, St Mawgan & St Wenn; St Columb Minor & Colan; St Dennis & St Enoder; St Goran, Tregony & the Roseland (part); St Mewan & Grampound; St Newlyn East, Cubert & Goonhavern (part); St Stephen-in-Brannel	A medium constituency located in the center of the county.
St Ives	69,978	13,786	Andrew George ¤	Derek Thomas ‡	Crowan, Sithney & Wendron (part); Helston North; Helston South & Meneage (part); Land's End; Long Rock, Marazion & St Erth; Ludgvan, Madron, Gulval & Heamoor; Mousehole, Newlyn & St Buryan; Mullion & St Keverne; Penzance East; Penzance Promenade; Porthleven, Breage & Germoe; St Ives, Lelant & Carbis Bay; St Ives West & Towednack; Isles of Scilly	A medium constituency located in the extreme south west of the county.
Truro and Falmouth	72,982	8,151	Jayne Kirkham †	Cherilyn Mackrory ‡	Falmouth Arwenack; Falmouth Boslowick; Falmouth Penwerris; Falmouth Trescobeas & Budock (part); Feock & Kea; Gloweth, Malabar & Shortlanesend; Lanner, Stithians & Gwennap (part); Mylor, Perranarworthal & Ponsanooth (part); Penryn; Perranporth (part); Probus & St Erme; St Agnes (part); St Goran, Tregony & the Roseland (part); St Newlyn East, Cubert & Goonhaven (part); Threemilestone & Chacewater; Truro Boscawen & Redannick; Truro Moresk & Trehaverne	A medium constituency located in the centre of the county. Due to the elongated shape of the county, no constituencies border it to the north or the south despite its central location.

== Boundary changes ==
=== 2024 ===
See 2023 review of Westminster constituencies for further details.

Name	Boundaries 2010–2024	Name	Boundaries 2024–present
1. Camborne and Redruth CC; 2. North Cornwall CC; 3. South East Cornwall CC; 4. St Austell and Newquay CC; 5. St Ives CC; 6. Truro and Falmouth CC	Parliamentary constituencies in Cornwall (2010-2024)	1. Camborne and Redruth CC; 2. North Cornwall CC; 3. South East Cornwall CC; 4. St Austell and Newquay CC; 5. St Ives CC; 6. Truro and Falmouth CC	Parliamentary constituencies in Cornwall (2024-present)

For the 2023 review of Westminster constituencies, which redrew the constituency map ahead of the 2024 United Kingdom general election, the Boundary Commission for England retained the six existing parliamentary constituencies in Cornwall with the same names and relatively minor alterations compared to other parts of the country.

=== 2010 ===
Under the Fifth periodic review of Westminster constituencies, the Boundary Commission for England decided to increase the number of seats which covered Cornwall from 5 to 6. Falmouth and Camborne, and Truro and St Austell were abolished and replaced by Camborne and Redruth, St Austell and Newquay, and Truro and Falmouth.

Name (1997-2010)	Boundaries 1997–2010	Name (2010-2024)	Boundaries 2010–2024
1. Falmouth and Camborne CC; 2. North Cornwall CC; 3. South East Cornwall CC; 4. St Ives CC; 5. Truro and St Austell CC	Parliamentary constituencies in Cornwall	1. Camborne and Redruth CC; 2. North Cornwall CC; 3. South East Cornwall CC; 4. St Austell and Newquay CC; 5. St Ives CC; 6. Truro and Falmouth CC	Proposed Revised constituencies in Cornwall

== Results history ==
Primary data source: House of Commons research briefing – General election results from 1918 to 2019

=== Vote breakdown ===
Year	Labour			Conservative			Liberal Democrats			Reform			Green			UKIP			Mebyon Kernow			Others		Notes
Year	Votes	%	-/+	Votes	%	-/+	Votes	%	-/+	Votes	%	-/+	Votes	%	-/+	Votes	%	-/+	Votes	%	-/+	Votes	%	Notes
2024	77,517	26.4	+3.3	76,817	26.2	-27.6	72,881	24.8	+5.5	48,574	16.6	+16.6	13,778	4.7	+2.5	111	0.0	+0.0	did not contest			3,629	1.3	
2019	74,392	23.1	-3.6	173,027	53.8	+5.4	62,165	19.3	-4.2	did not contest			7,129	2.2	+1.1	did not contest			1,660	0.5	+0.5	3,602	1.1	
2017	83,968	26.7	+14.4	152,428	48.4	+5.3	73,875	23.5	+1.1	did not exist			3,218	1.0	-4.8	897	0.3	-13.5	did not contest			323	0.1	
2015	36,235	12.3	+3.7	127,079	43.1	+2.2	66,056	22.4	-19.4	did not exist			17,241	5.8	+4.5	40,785	13.8	+8.9	5,675	1.9	Steady	1,757	0.6	
2010	24,257	8.6	-7.0	115,016	40.9	+9.1	117,307	41.8	-2.6	did not exist			3,573	1.3	+0.6	13,763	4.9	-0.1	5,379	1.9	+0.5	1,586	0.6	
2005	41,140	15.6	-1.7	82,543	31.8	-0.8	115,241	44.4	-0.4	did not exist			1,738	0.7	+0.7	12,863	5.0	+1.3	3,552	1.4	+0.1	2,356	0.9	
2001	43,674	17.3	+0.2	82,227	32.6	+2.2	113,000	44.8	+0.9	did not exist			did not contest			9,290	3.7	+2.7	3,199	1.3	+0.6	727	0.3	
1997	47,913	17.1	+3.2	85,077	30.4	-12.3	123,124	43.9	+2.2	did not exist			482	0.2	-0.1	2,926	1.0	+1.0	1,906	0.7	+0.7	18,779	6.7	
1992	41,593	13.9	+1.3	127,678	42.7	-4.6	124,553	41.7	+1.7	did not exist			1,035	0.3	+0.3	did not exist			did not contest			4,098	1.4	
1987	34,994	12.6	+3.7	131,194	47.3	-2.0	111,064	40.0	-0.8	did not exist			did not contest			did not exist			did not contest			373	0.1	
1983	22,838	8.9	-3.7	126,182	49.3	-1.3	104,365	40.8	+6.6	did not exist			776	0.3	-0.2	did not exist			1,151	0.5	-1.1	677	0.3	

=== Percentage votes ===
Election year	1923	1924	1929	1945	1950	1951	1955	1959	1964	1966	1970	1974 (Feb)	1974 (Oct)	1979	1983	1987	1992	1997	2001	2005	2010	2015	2017	2019	2024
Labour	2.3	9.7	18.1	25.4	29.6	33.3	30.7	27.5	25.9	27.6	24.6	19.6	20.0	12.6	8.9	12.6	13.9	17.1	17.3	15.9	8.6	12.3	26.7	23.1	26.4
Conservative^{1}	35.0	48.6	38.4	42.0	44.2	50.5	48.5	43.8	41.1	41.1	47.9	41.8	43.6	50.6	49.3	47.3	42.7	30.4	32.6	31.8	40.9	43.1	48.4	53.8	26.2
Liberal Democrat^{2}	52.6	41.7	42.4	32.6	26.2	16.2	20.8	28.7	32.8	30.6	27.0	38.2	35.2	34.2	40.8	40.0	41.7	44.0	44.8	44.4	41.8	22.4	23.5	19.3	24.8
Reform	–	–	–	–	–	–	–	–	–	–	–	–	–	–	–	–	–	–	–	–	–	–	–	–	16.6
Green Party	–	–	–	–	–	–	–	–	–	–	–	–	–	–	–	*	*	*	*	*	1.3	5.8	1.0	2.2	4.7
UKIP	–	–	–	–	–	–	–	–	–	–	–	–	–	–	–	–	–	*	*	*	4.9	13.8	0.3	–	0.0
Other	10.0	–	1.2	0.4	–	–	–	–	0.1	0.7	0.4	0.4	1.2	2.6	1.0	0.1	1.7	8.6	5.2	7.9	2.5	2.5	0.1	1.6	1.3

^{1}Includes Constitutionalist in 1924 and National Liberal Party up to 1966

^{2}1950–1979 – Liberal; 1983 & 1987 – SDP–Liberal Alliance

Meaningful vote percentages are not applicable for the elections of 1918, 1922, 1931 and 1935 since one or more seats were gained unopposed.

=== Seats ===
Election year	1918	1922	1923	1924	1929	1931	1935	1945	1950	1951	1955	1959	1964	1966	1970	1974 (Feb)	1974 (Oct)	1979	1983	1987	1992	1997	2001	2005	2010	2015	2017	2019	2024
Labour	0	0	0	0	0	0	0	1	1	1	1	1	1	1	0	0	0	0	0	0	0	1	1	0	0	0	0	0	4
Liberal Democrat^{2}	2	1	4	0	5	2	1	1	0	0	0	0	1	2	1	2	2	1	1	1	2	4	4	5	3	0	0	0	2
Conservative^{1}	2	2	0	5	0	3	4	3	4	4	4	4	3	2	4	3	3	4	4	4	3	0	0	0	3	6	6	6	0
National Liberal	1	2	0	0	0	0	0	0	0	0	0	0	0	0	0	0	0	0	0	0	0	0	0	0	0	0	0	0	0
Independent Liberal	0	0	1	0	0	0	0	0	0	0	0	0	0	0	0	0	0	0	0	0	0	0	0	0	0	0	0	0	0
Total	5	5	5	5	5	5	5	5	5	5	5	5	5	5	5	5	5	5	5	5	5	5	5	5	6	6	6	6	6

^{1}Includes Constitutionalist in 1924 and National Liberal Party up to 1966

^{2}pre-1979 – Liberal; 1983 & 1987 – SDP–Liberal Alliance

=== Maps ===
==== 1885–1910 ====
1885

1886

1892

1895

1900

1906

Jan 1910

Dec 1910

==== 1918–1945 ====
1918

1922

1923

1924

1929

1931

1935

1945

==== 1950–present ====
1950

1951

1955

1959

1964

1966

1970

1974 Feb

1974 Oct

1979

1983

1987

1992

1997

2001

2005

2010

2015

2017

2019

2024

== Historical representation by party ==
A cell marked → (with a different colour background to the preceding cell) indicates that the previous MP continued to sit under a new party name.

=== 1832 to 1847 (14 MPs) ===
Conservative Radical Whig

Constituency	1832	1835	1837	38	40	1841	42	43	44	45	46
Bodmin	Peter	C. Vivian						Spry			
Bodmin	Spry		→			Gardner					
Cornwall Eastern	Molesworth		R. H. Vivian			W. Rashleigh					
Cornwall Eastern	W. Salusbury-Trelawny		Eliot							Pole-Carew	
Cornwall Western	Wynne-Pendarves										
Cornwall Western	Lemon					Boscawen-Rose	Lemon				
Helston	Lane-Fox	Townshend	Sackville		Basset	R. Vyvyan					
Launceston	Hardinge								Bowles		
Liskeard	C. Buller										
Penryn & Falmouth	Rolfe				Hutchins	J. C. Vivian					
Penryn & Falmouth	Bury	Freshfield				Plumridge					
St Ives	Halse			W. Praed							Powlett
Truro	R. H. Vivian	J. E. Vivian									
Truro	Tooke		Turner								

=== 1847 to 1868 (14 MPs) ===
Conservative Independent Liberal Liberal Peelite Radical Whig

Constituency	1847	49	1852	53	54	1857	58	1859	59	65	1865	66	68
Bodmin	Wyld		Michell			J. C. Vivian		Leveson-Gower					
Bodmin	Lacy		Graves-Sawle			Wyld		Michell	Wyld				
Cornwall Eastern	T. J. Agar-Robartes							→					
Cornwall Eastern	Pole-Carew		Kendall										
Cornwall Western	Wynne-Pendarves			Williams			St Aubyn	→					
Cornwall Western	Lemon					Davey		→					
Helston	R. Vyvyan					Trueman		Rogers			Young	W. Brett	
Launceston	Bowles		Percy					Haliburton			Campbell		Lopes
Liskeard	C. Buller	Crowder			Grey			Osborne			A. Buller		
Penryn & Falmouth	Gwyn					Baring		→				Smith	
Penryn & Falmouth	Mowatt		Freshfield			Gurney							
St Ives	Powlett		Laffan			Paull							
Truro	J. E. Vivian					A. Smith		→			J. C. Vivian		
Truro	Turner	H. Willyams	H. Vivian			E. Willyams		M. Smith		F. Williams			

=== 1868 to 1885 (13 MPs) ===
Conservative Liberal

Constituency	1868	69	71	1874	74	76	77	78	1880	81	82	85
Bodmin	Leveson-Gower											
Cornwall Eastern	E. Willyams			C. Rashleigh					T. C. Agar-Robartes		Dyke Acland	
Cornwall Eastern	J. Salusbury-Trelawney			J. Tremayne					Borlase			
Cornwall Western	St Aubyn											
Cornwall Western	A. Vivian											
Helston	Young								Molesworth-St Aubyn			
Launceston	Lopes			Deakin			Giffard					Webster
Liskeard	A. Buller	Horsman				Courtney						
Penryn & Falmouth	Fowler			Jenkins								
Penryn & Falmouth	Eastwick			Cole					R. Brett			
St Ives	Magniac			Davenport	C. Praed				Reed	Ross		
Truro	J. C. Vivian		McGarel-Hogg									
Truro	F. Williams							A. Tremayne	E. Willyams			

=== 1885 to 1906 (7 MPs) ===
Conservative Independent Liberal Liberal Liberal Unionist

Constituency	1885	1886	87	1892	1895	98	99	1900	03	04
Bodmin	Courtney	→					→	Molesworth		
Camborne	Conybeare	→			Strauss			Caine	Lawson	
Launceston	C. Dyke-Acland			Owen		Moulton				
Penryn and Falmouth	Jenkins	Cavendish-Bentinck			Horniman					
St Austell	Borlase		McArthur							
St Ives	St Aubyn	→	Bolitho					Hain		→
Truro	Bickford-Smith	→		Williams	Durning-Lawrence					

=== 1906 to 1918 (7 MPs) ===
Conservative Liberal Liberal Unionist

Constituency	1906	06	08	Jan 1910	Dec 1910	12	15	16
Bodmin	Agar-Robartes	Freeman-Thomas		Grenfell	Pole-Carew	→		Hanson
Camborne	Dunn				F. Dyke Acland			
Launceston	Marks							
Penryn and Falmouth	Barker			Goldman				
St Austell	McArthur		Agar-Robartes				Layland-Barratt	
St Ives	Cory							
Truro	Morgan							

=== 1918 to 1931 (5 MPs) ===
Coalition Liberal (1918–22) / National Liberal (1922–23) Conservative Constitutionalist Independent Liberal Liberal National Liberal (1931–68)

Constituency	1918	22	1922	1923	1924	24	28	1929	31
Bodmin	Hanson	Foot			Harrison			Foot	
Camborne	Dyke Acland		Moreing	Jones	Moreing	→		Jones	
Cornwall North	Marks		→	→	Williams			Maclean	
Penryn and Falmouth	Nicholl		Shipwright	Mansel	Pilcher			Walters	
St Ives	Cory		Hawke	Cory	Hawke		H. Runciman	W. Runciman	→

=== 1931 to 1950 (5 MPs) ===
Conservative Independent Labour Liberal National Liberal (1931–68)

Constituency	1931	32	1935	37	39	41	1945	46	47
Bodmin	Foot		Rathbone			B. Rathbone	Marshall		
Camborne	Agnew								
Cornwall North	Maclean	Dyke Acland			Horabin			→	→
Penryn and Falmouth	Petherick						King		
St Ives	W. Runciman			Beechman					

=== 1950 to 1983 (5 MPs) ===
Conservative Labour Liberal Liberal Democrats National Liberal (1931–68)

Constituency	1950	1951	1955	1959	1964	1966	68	1970	Feb 1974	Oct 1974	1979
Bodmin	Marshall				Bessell			Hicks	Tyler	Hicks	
Cornwall North	Roper			Scott-Hopkins		Pardoe					Neale
Falmouth & Camborne	Hayman					Dunwoody		Mudd			
St Ives	Howard					Nott	→				
Truro	Wilson							Dixon		Penhaligon	

=== 1983 to 2010 (5 MPs) ===
Conservative Labour Liberal Liberal Democrats National Liberal (1931–68)

Constituency	1983	87	1987	88	1992	1997	2001	2005
Cornwall North	Neale				Tyler			Rogerson
Cornwall South East	Hicks					Breed		
Falmouth and Camborne	Mudd				Coe	Atherton		Goldsworthy
St Ives	Harris					George		
Truro / Truro & St Austell ('97)	Penhaligon	Taylor		→				

=== 2010 to present (6 MPs) ===
Conservative Labour Liberal Democrats

Constituency	2010	2015	2017	2019	2024
Camborne and Redruth	Eustice				Moon
North Cornwall	Rogerson	Mann			Maguire
South East Cornwall	Murray				Gelderd
St Austell and Newquay	Gilbert	Double			Law
St Ives	George	Thomas			George
Truro and Falmouth	Newton			Mackrory	Kirkham

== See also ==
- List of constituencies in South West England
