= Robert Rolfe =

Robert Rolfe may refer to:

- Robert Rolfe, 1st Baron Cranworth (1790–1868), British lawyer and statesman
- Robert Allen Rolfe (1855–1921), British botanist
- Red Rolfe (Robert Abial Rolfe, 1908–1969), U.S. baseball player
