= Ministry of Works (United Kingdom) =

UK government department, 1940–1970

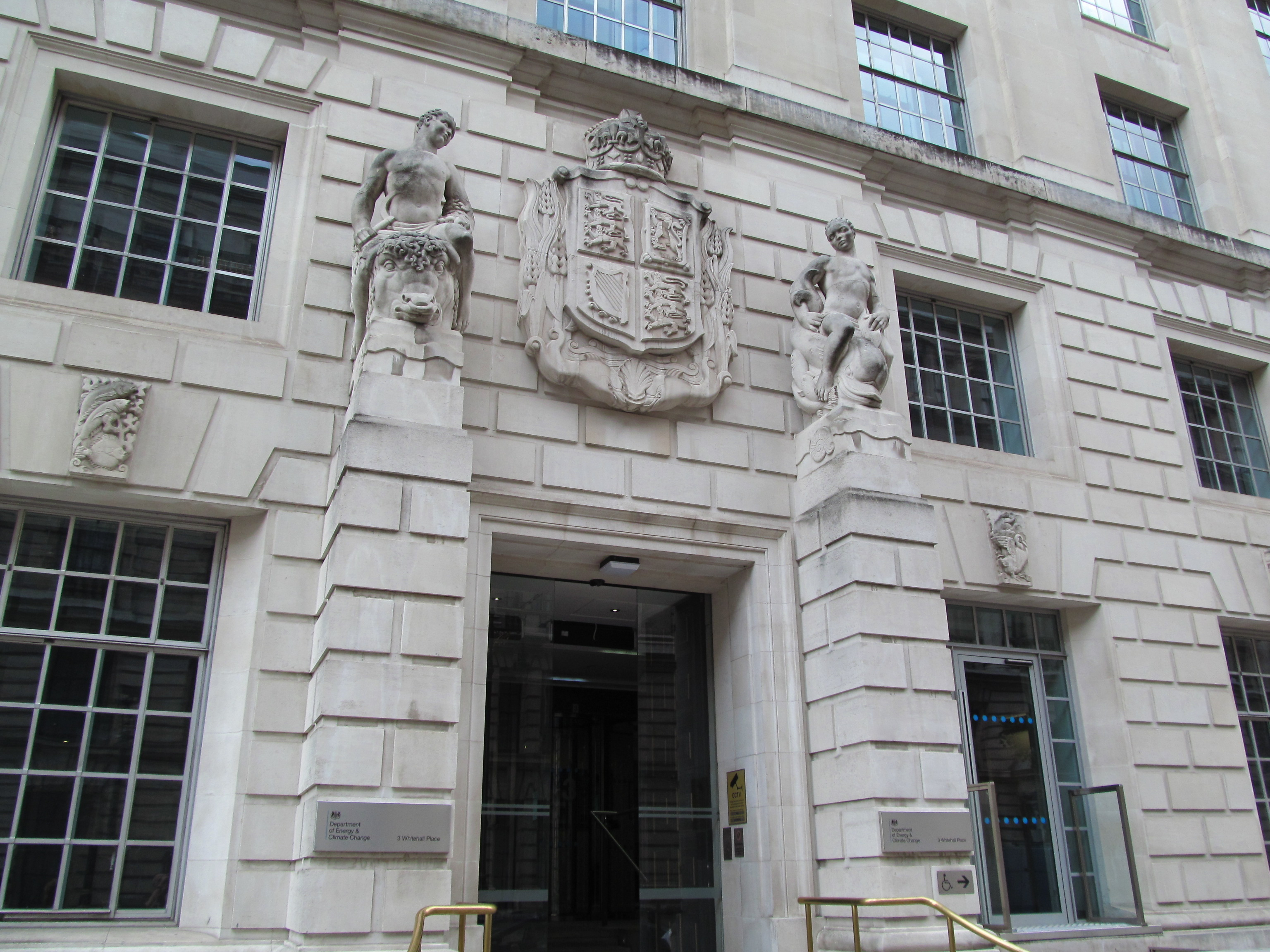
Headquarters of the ministry, 3 Whitehall Place

The Ministry of Works was a department of the UK Government formed in 1940, during the Second World War, to organise the requisitioning of property for wartime use. After the war, the ministry retained responsibility for government building projects.

In 1962 it was renamed the Ministry of Public Building and Works, and acquired the extra responsibility of monitoring the building industry as well as taking over the works departments from the War Office, Air Ministry and Admiralty. The chief architect of the ministry from 1951 to 1970 was Eric Bedford. In 1970 the ministry was absorbed into the Department of the Environment (DoE), although from 1972 most former works functions were transferred to the largely autonomous Property Services Agency (PSA). Subsequent reorganisation of PSA into Property Holdings was followed by abolition in 1996 when individual government departments took on responsibility for managing their own estate portfolios.

== History ==
The tradition of building specific structures for military or governmental use began to break down at the time of the First World War, when the unprecedented need for armaments prompted the rapid construction of factories in English locations where a skilled workforce was not easily recruited.

=== Precedents ===
The department originally derived from the Office of Works (the King's Works) responsible only for royal properties (1378–1832) which became the Office of Woods, Forest, Land Revenues and Works (1832–1852). The Office of Works was founded in 1851 and became the Ministry of Works in 1940.

This became the Ministry of Works and Planning (1942–1943), the Ministry of Housing and Local Government (MHLG) 1951–1962, and the Ministry of Public Building and Works (1962–1970) before being subsumed in the Department of the Environment in 1970 and English Heritage in 1984.

=== Housing ===
Architect Frank Baines (1877–1933) guided the rapid development of estates of houses, mainly in a terraced style, for workers and their families in places close to the required factories and depots. Examples included the Well Hall garden suburb south of the Royal Arsenal, Woolwich (between Eltham and Shooters Hill), Aeroville near the Grahame-White aeroplane factory at Hendon, and the Roe Green estate at Stag Lane in the London Borough of Brent. Considering the pace of their construction, these estates were surprisingly picturesque and were subsequently considered superior in scenic terms to many estates of municipal housing that followed in the peacetime of the 1920s, guided by the Tudor Walters Committee report of 1919 and the Housing, Town Planning, &c. Act 1919.

Their styling owed much to the English garden suburb tradition (seen at Bournville, Letchworth, Saltaire, Port Sunlight and Welwyn Garden City) and garden areas and front boundaries were generally more varied than on contemporary estates within military bases where state ownership endured over a longer period. More modern examples include a large estate near central Malvern built 1952–1953 for the scientists and personnel of TRE. The styling, though more upmarket, resembled the typical council estates of semi-detached houses being built around the UK during the post-war years. By the late 20th century the Well Hall example had become known as the Progress Estate.

=== Monuments ===
From the 1880s the Office of Works was also responsible for the upkeep of ancient monuments, a role later taken on by the Department of the Environment and later, when responsibility for heritage matters was devolved, in 1977, by English Heritage and the other home country heritage organisations. As such it forms the basis for any research into official or historic structures ranging from post offices to palaces and all archaeological sites in state care, including Stonehenge. In conjunction with the Foreign Office it also was responsible for the fabric of British embassies and consulates across the world. Apart from English Heritage, Historic Scotland and Cadw, its vast archive is dispersed throughout many other organisations including national museums and galleries, other government departments including the Government Art Collection and the now hived-off agencies covering royal parks and palaces.

Virtually every record office, every museum and every town council in the British Isles will hold files relating to the MOW who in 1947 enabled the first 'lists' defining and protecting historic buildings which now forms the heritage protection of over 400,000 sites. A detailed history of offices and staff remains to be written: the work of the almost completely anonymous civil servants who worked for this very large government department is largely absent from published or online sources unless these manifold official activities impinge on current specialised research on the military, archaeological or architectural links.

== Origins ==
The Ministry of Works descended from a long line of offices with responsibilities for managing royal and then governmental property. These are summarised below.

- 1378–1832 Office of Works. This office was established to oversee the building and maintenance of Crown property such as royal castles and residences.
- 1832–1851 Office of Woods, Forests, Land Revenues, Works and Buildings. The Office of Works continued to operate as the Works Department within the larger office.
- 1851–1940 Office of Works. The office was given a separate identity in order to bring it under the direct control of Parliament.
- 1940–1942 Ministry of Works and Buildings. The ministry was formed during the Second World War as the government's need for new buildings and the conversion of existing buildings became more urgent.
- 1942–1943 Ministry of Works and Planning.
- 1943–1962 Ministry of Works.
- 1962–1970 Ministry of Public Building and Works.

== Buildings constructed by the ministry ==
- BT Tower, London
- Ordnance Survey head office, Southampton

== See also ==
- First Commissioner of Works (the political heads of the Ministry)
