= Edward Eastwick =

English orientalist, diplomat and member of parliament

Edward Backhouse Eastwick CB (1814 – 16 July 1883, Ventnor, Isle of Wight) was an English orientalist, diplomat and Conservative member of parliament. He wrote and edited a number of books on South Asian countries. These included a Sindhi vocabulary and a grammar of the Hindustani language.

== Life and works ==
Born a member of an Anglo-Indian family, he was educated at Charterhouse and at Merton College, Oxford. A brother was Captain William Joseph Eastwick. He joined the Bombay infantry in 1836, but, owing to his talent for languages, was soon given a political post. In 1843 he translated the Persian Kessahi Sanjan, or History of the Arrival of the Parsees in India; and he wrote a Life of Zoroaster, a Sindhi vocabulary, and various papers in the transactions of the Bombay Asiatic Society. Compelled by ill-health to return to Europe, he went to Frankfurt, where he learned German and translated Schiller's Revolt of the Netherlands and Bopp's Comparative Grammar.

In 1845 he was appointed professor of Hindustani at Haileybury College. Two years later he published a Hindustani grammar, and in subsequent years a new edition of Saadi's Gulistán, with a translation in prose and verse, also an edition with vocabulary of the Hindi translation of Chatur Chuj Misr's Prem Sagar, and translations of the Bagh-o-Bahar, and of the Anwar-i Suhaili of Bidpai. In 1851 he was elected a Fellow of the Royal Society.

In 1857–1858 he edited The Autobiography of Latfullah, A Mohamedan Gentleman. He also edited for the Bible Society the Book of Genesis in the Dakhani language. From 4 May 1860 to 1863 he was in Persia as secretary to the British Legation, publishing on his return The Journal of a Diplomate's Three Years' Residence in Persia. In 1866 he became private secretary to the secretary of state for India, Lord Cranborne (afterwards marquess of Salisbury), and in 1867 went, as in 1864, on a government mission to Venezuela. He had meanwhile resigned his commission as a major in the London Rifle Volunteer Brigade in June 1861.

On his return Eastwick wrote, at the request of Charles Dickens, for All the Year Round, "Sketches of Life in a South American Republic". From 1868 to 1874 he was member of parliament (MP) for Penryn and Falmouth. In 1875, he received the degree of MA with the franchise from the University of Oxford, "as a slight recognition of distinguished services". At various times he wrote several of Murray's Indian handbooks. His last work was the Kaisarnamah-i-Hind ("The Lay of the Empress"), in two volumes (1878–1882).

Eastwick died at Ventnor, Isle of Wight, on 16 July 1883, and was survived by his wife, Rosina Jane, daughter of James Hunter of Hapton House, Argyll, whom he had married in 1847 and by whom he had at least two children, Robert William Egerton Eastwick and Beatrice Heron-Maxwell.

== Sources ==
- Stephen, Leslie, ed. (1888). "Eastwick, Edward Backhouse" . Dictionary of National Biography. Vol. 16. London: Smith, Elder & Co.
- Lane-Poole, Stanley; Loloi, Parvin. "Eastwick, Edward Backhouse (1814–1883)". Oxford Dictionary of National Biography (online ed.). Oxford University Press. doi:10.1093/ref:odnb/8418. (Subscription, Wikipedia Library access or UK public library membership required.)

Parliament of the United Kingdom
Preceded by Jervoise Smith; Samuel Gurney	Member of Parliament for Penryn & Falmouth; 1868–1874; With: Robert Fowler	Succeeded by David James Jenkins; Henry Thomas Cole
