= Jervoise Smith =

British politician (1828-1884)

Member of Parliament for Penryn and Falmouth
- In office 15 October 1866 – 17 November 1868 Serving with Samuel Gurney
- Preceded by: Thomas Baring; Samuel Gurney
- Succeeded by: Robert Fowler; Edward Eastwick

Personal details
- Born: 3 October 1828
- Died: 21 July 1884 (aged 55)
- Party: Liberal
- Spouse: Margaret Louisa Verney (m. 1874)
- Parent(s): John Abel Smith; Anne Clarke-Jervoise

Jervoise Smith (3 October 1828 – 21 July 1884) was a British Liberal Party politician and banker.

Smith was the son of former Chichester MP John Abel Smith and Anne née Clarke-Jervoise. He married Margaret Louisa Verney, daughter of Robert Verney in 1874, and they had issue.

He was a partner in the banking firm Smith, Payne, and Smiths, the first British bank believed to be formed outside London but later gaining a home on Lombard Street. In 1881, he worked at the bank with Samuel George Smith, Robert Smith, Oswald Augustus Smith, Eric Carrington Smith, and Martin Ridley Smith.

Smith was elected a Liberal MP for Penryn and Falmouth at a by-election in 1866 but lost the seat at the next general election in 1868.

Parliament of the United Kingdom
Preceded by Thomas Baring; Samuel Gurney	Member of Parliament for Penryn and Falmouth; 1866–1868; With: Samuel Gurney	Succeeded by Robert Fowler; Edward Eastwick
