= Thomas Baring, 1st Earl of Northbrook =

British Liberal politician (1826–1904)

His Excellency The Right Honourable The Earl of Northbrook GCSI PC FRS
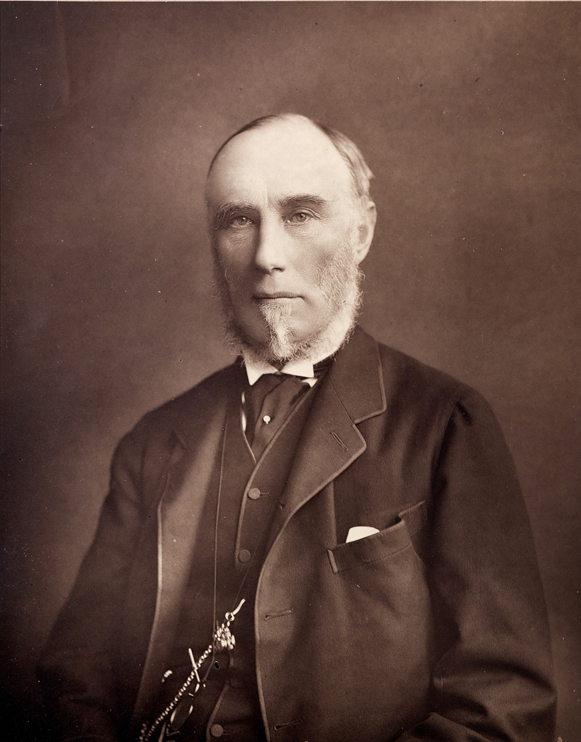
- The 1st Earl of Northbrook, c. 1889

Viceroy and Governor-General of India
- In office 3 May 1872 – 12 April 1876
- Monarch: Victoria
- Preceded by: The Lord Napier (as acting Viceroy)
- Succeeded by: The Lord Lytton

Lord Lieutenant of Hampshire
- In office 7 November 1890 – 15 November 1904
- Monarch: Victoria
- Preceded by: The Lord Carnarvon
- Succeeded by: The Lord Winchester

Member of Parliament for Penryn and Falmouth
- In office 24 April 1857 – 15 October 1866
- Preceded by: Howel Gwyn
- Succeeded by: Jervoise Smith

Personal details
- Born: Thomas George Baring; 22 January 1826
- Died: 15 November 1904 (aged 78) Stratton Park, Hampshire
- Party: Liberal
- Spouse: Elizabeth Sturt (m. 1848; died 1867)
- Education: Christ Church, Oxford

Thomas George Baring, 1st Earl of Northbrook, GCSI, PC, FRS (22 January 1826 – 15 November 1904) was a British Liberal politician and statesman who served as Viceroy of India 1872–1876.

His major accomplishments came as an energetic reformer who was dedicated to upgrading the quality of government in the British Indian Empire. He reduced taxes and overcame bureaucratic obstacles in an effort to reduce both starvation and widespread social unrest. He also served as First Lord of the Admiralty between 1880 and 1885.

== Background and education ==
Northbrook was the eldest son of Francis Baring, 1st Baron Northbrook, by his first wife Jane, daughter of the Sir George Grey, 1st Baronet. Jane died when young Thomas was less than thirteen, and he studied under a tutor, Mr. Bird, at home and took an interest in natural history. At fourteen Thomas wrote to his father who was holidaying at Weymouth to capture a yellow butterfly with black spots at the end of each wing known to be found on Portland Island. He was sent briefly to another tutor, Mr. Vaughan Johnson at Chalons-sur-Marne, to study French. He also took an interest in sketching, learning from S. Palmer, and later his friend Edward Lear. He went to Christ Church, Oxford in 1843, and graduated with honours in 1846. He travelled in Europe and took an interest in mountaineering, joining his friend from Oxford, Alfred Seymour.

== Political career ==
Northbrook entered upon a political career, and was successively private secretary to Henry Labouchere (Board of Trade), Sir George Grey (Home Office), and Sir Charles Wood (India Office and then Admiralty to 1857). In 1847 he served on the committee of the British Relief Association. In 1857, he was returned to the House of Commons for Penryn and Falmouth, which he represented until becoming a peer on the death of his father in 1866. He served under Lord Palmerston as Civil Lord of the Admiralty between 1857 and 1858, as Under-Secretary of State for War in 1861, as Under-Secretary of State for India between 1861 and 1864, under Palmerston and Lord Russell as Under-Secretary of State for the Home Department between 1864 and 1866 and under Russell as Secretary to the Admiralty in 1866.

When William Ewart Gladstone acceded to power in 1868, Baring was again appointed Under-Secretary of State for War, and this office he held until February 1872, when he was appointed Viceroy of India. On 3 May he was Knight Grand Commander of the Order of the Star of India and ex officio Grand Master of the Order.

In January 1876, however, he resigned. He had recommended the conclusion of arrangements with Sher Ali Khan which, as has since been admitted, would have prevented the Second Anglo-Afghan War; but his policy was overruled by the Duke of Argyll, then Secretary of State for India. in 1876 he was created Viscount Baring, of Lee in the County of Kent, and Earl of Northbrook, in the County of Southampton.

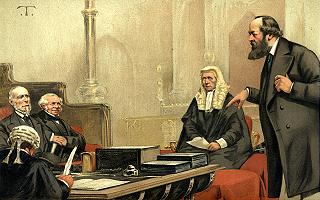
Caricature of The Lords Northbrook, Granville, Selborne and Salisbury. Caption read "Purse, Pussy, Piety and Prevarication". Published in Vanity Fair, 5 July 1882.

From 1880 to 1885 Northbrook held the post of First Lord of the Admiralty in Gladstone's second government. During his tenure of office the state of the navy aroused much public anxiety and led to a strong agitation in favor of an extended shipbuilding programme. The agitation called forth Tennyson's poem The Fleet. In September 1884, Northbrook was sent to Egypt as special commissioner to inquire into its finances and condition. The inquiry was largely unnecessary, all the essential facts being well known, but the mission was a device of Gladstone's to avoid an immediate decision on a perplexing question. Northbrook, after six weeks of inquiry in Egypt, sent in two reports, one general, advising against the withdrawal of the British garrison, and one financial. His financial proposals, if accepted, would have substituted the financial control of Britain for the international control proposed at the London Conference of June–August of the same year, but this was not carried out. When Gladstone formed his third ministry in 1886 Baring held aloof, being opposed to the Home Rule policy of the prime minister; and he then ceased to take a prominent part in political life.

== Other work ==
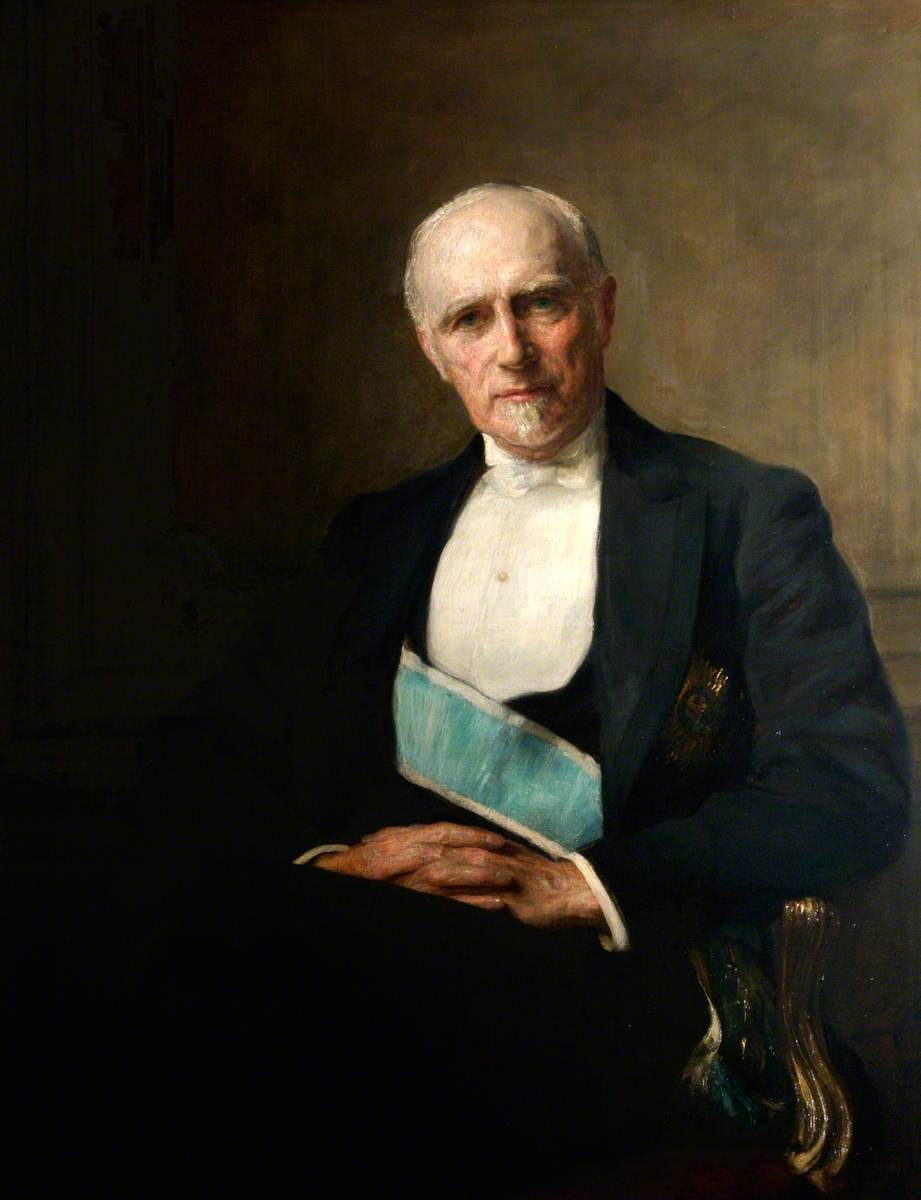
Lord Northbrook

Baring had served in the Hampshire Yeomanry, reaching the rank of major, and was appointed the regiment's Honorary Colonel on 26 January 1889.

In 1890 he was appointed Lord Lieutenant of Hampshire.

In the 1880s he was president of an offshoot of the National Indian Association, which was named the Northbrook Indian Society after its president. From 1890 to 1893 he was president of the Royal Asiatic Society.

In 1898 he sold the land of Manor House Gardens, to the London County Council, and also gifted land in Lee to public use, which was opened as Northbrook Park in 1903.

He was elected a Fellow of the Royal Botanic Society in November 1902.

== Family ==
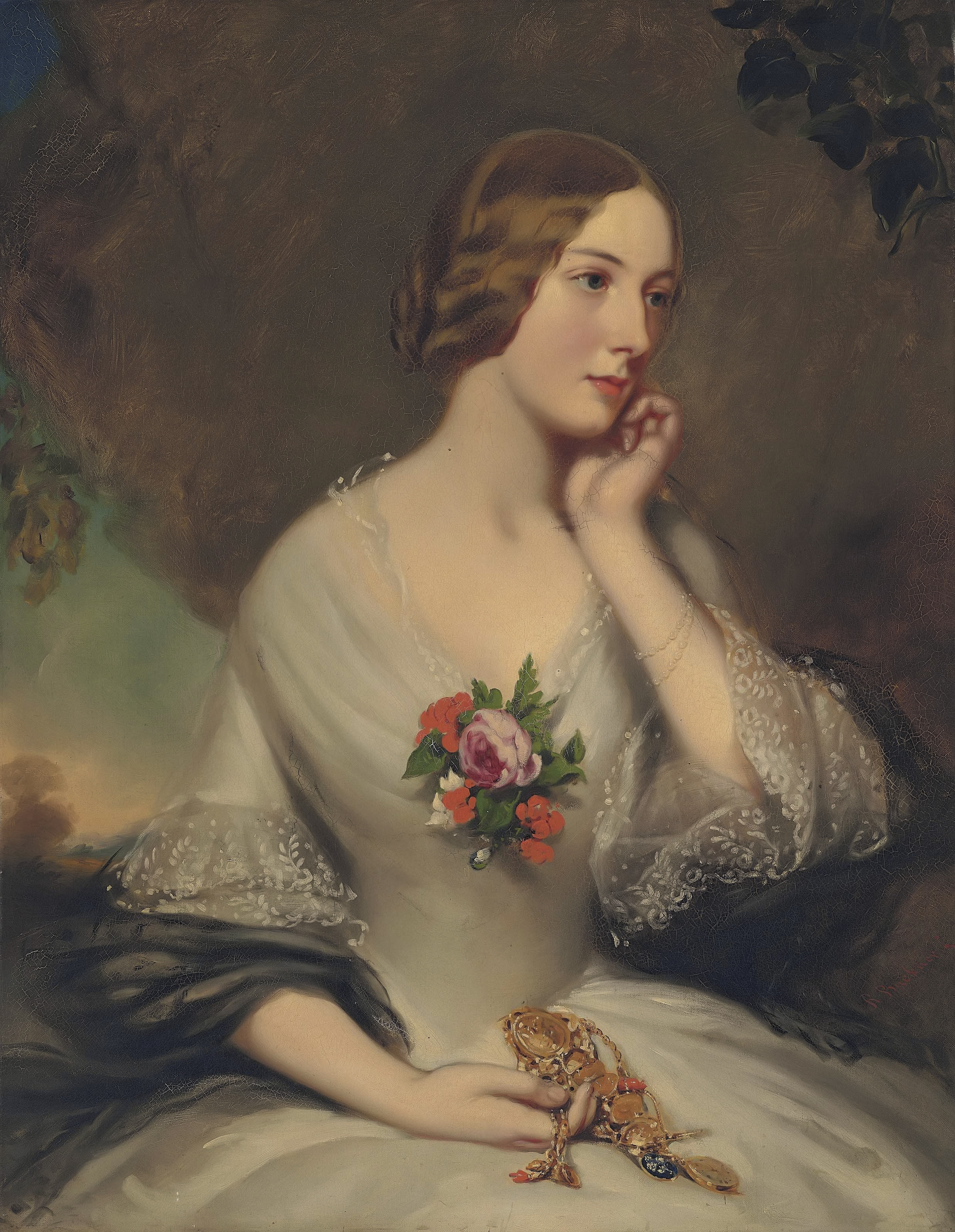
Elizabeth Baring, wife of Thomas Baring (Richard Buckner)

Lord Northbrook married Elizabeth, daughter of Henry Charles Sturt and sister of Lord Alington, in 1848. They had two sons and one daughter. His wife died in June 1867, aged 40. Because her mother had died, the young Lady Jane Emma Baring (1853–1936) acted as her father's Viceregal hostess in India from 1872 to 1876. In 1878 she was rewarded with the Order of the Crown of India.

Northbrook remained a widower until his death at Stratton Park, Hampshire, in November 1904, aged 78. There is a memorial to him at All Saints, East Stratton. He was succeeded in the earldom by his eldest son, Francis Baring.

== Legacy in India ==
The Ghanta Ghar Multan, or Clock Tower of Multan, is named "Northbrook Tower". It is located in the center of Multan in Punjab province, Pakistan. A library named "Northbrook Hall" is located in Dhaka, capital of Bangladesh. Northbrook Gate was constructed in 1874 in Guwahati on the bank of the Brahmaputra river.

== See also ==
- Northbrook Hall
- Manor House Gardens

Parliament of the United Kingdom
Preceded by Howel Gwyn; James William Freshfield	Member of Parliament for Penryn and Falmouth; 1857–1866; With: Samuel Gurney	Succeeded by Samuel Gurney; Jervoise Smith
Political offices
Preceded by Henry James Baillie	Under-Secretary of State for India; 1859–1861	Succeeded by The Earl de Grey and Ripon
Preceded by The Earl de Grey and Ripon	Under-Secretary of State for War; 1861–1861	Succeeded by The Earl de Grey and Ripon
Preceded by The Earl de Grey and Ripon	Under-Secretary of State for India; 1861–1864	Succeeded by The Lord Wodehouse
Preceded by Henry Bruce	Under-Secretary of State for the Home Department; 1864–1866	Succeeded by Edward Knatchbull-Hugessen
Preceded by William Henry Smith	First Lord of the Admiralty; 1880–1885	Succeeded by Lord George Hamilton
Government offices
Preceded by The Lord Napier, acting	Viceroy of India; 1872–1876	Succeeded by The Lord Lytton
Honorary titles
Preceded by The Earl of Carnarvon	Lord Lieutenant of Hampshire; 1890–1904	Succeeded by The Marquess of Winchester
Peerage of the United Kingdom
New title	Earl of Northbrook; 1876–1904	Succeeded by Francis Baring
Preceded by Francis Baring	Baron Northbrook; 1866–1904	Succeeded by Francis Baring
