= Robert Merrick Fowler =

Vice-Admiral Robert Merrick Fowler
- Born: 1778; Horncastle, Lincolnshire, England
- Died: 25 May 1860 (aged 81–82); Whitchurch-on-Thames, Oxfordshire
- Military career
- Allegiance: United Kingdom
- Branch: Royal Navy
- Service years: 1793–1846
- Rank: Vice-Admiral
- Commands: HMS Porpoise; Sea Fencibles in Ireland; HMS Crocus; HMS Charybdis; HMS Nyaden; HMS Conqueror
- Conflicts: French Revolutionary War; Napoleonic Wars; Battle of Pulo Aura; Battle of Cape Finisterre; Walcheren Expedition

Vice-Admiral Robert Merrick Fowler (1778 – 25 May 1860) was an officer of the Royal Navy notable for his service as the second-in-command to Matthew Flinders on HMS Investigator from 1801 to 1803 and for his involvement in Battle of Pulo Aura in 1804.

== Career ==
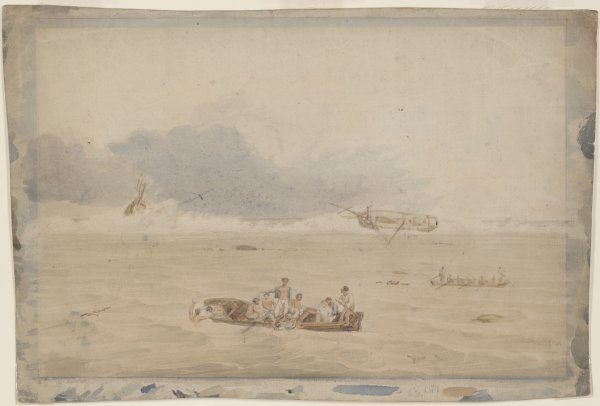
Wreck of the Porpoise, William Westall, 1803, National Library of Australia

Fowler, born 1778 at Horncastle, Lincolnshire, England joined the Royal Navy in May 1793 as a volunteer. He served as midshipman on Royal William and was promoted to lieutenant in February 1800.

He was posted to HMS Xenophon (later Investigator) as first lieutenant and second-in-command to Flinders during the years 1801–03. He was subsequently appointed to command HMS Porpoise which was wrecked off what is now Queensland on the homeward voyage during August 1803. Fowler was exonerated for the responsibility for the shipwreck at court-martial in 1804.

In 1804, Fowler and other survivors of the Porpoise joined a British fleet in Canton commanded by Captain Nathaniel Dance heading for the United Kingdom. Fowler distinguished himself at the Battle of Pulo Aura in February 1804 where a numerically superior French squadron under the command of Admiral Linois was repelled near Pulau Aur in what is now Malaysia. As an acknowledgement of his contribution, Fowler received a sword from Lloyd's Patriotic Fund.

Fowler was promoted to commander in 1806 and was on active service in home waters and West Indies Station during the years 1805–11. He promoted to post-captain in 1811. Fowler was promoted to rear-admiral in 1846 and vice-admiral on the Retired List in 1858.

Fowler retired to Walliscote House at Whitchurch-on-Thames in Oxfordshire and died in 1860. He was remembered by Flinders in 1802 in the naming of the following geographical places in South Australia: Fowlers Bay and Point Fowler.

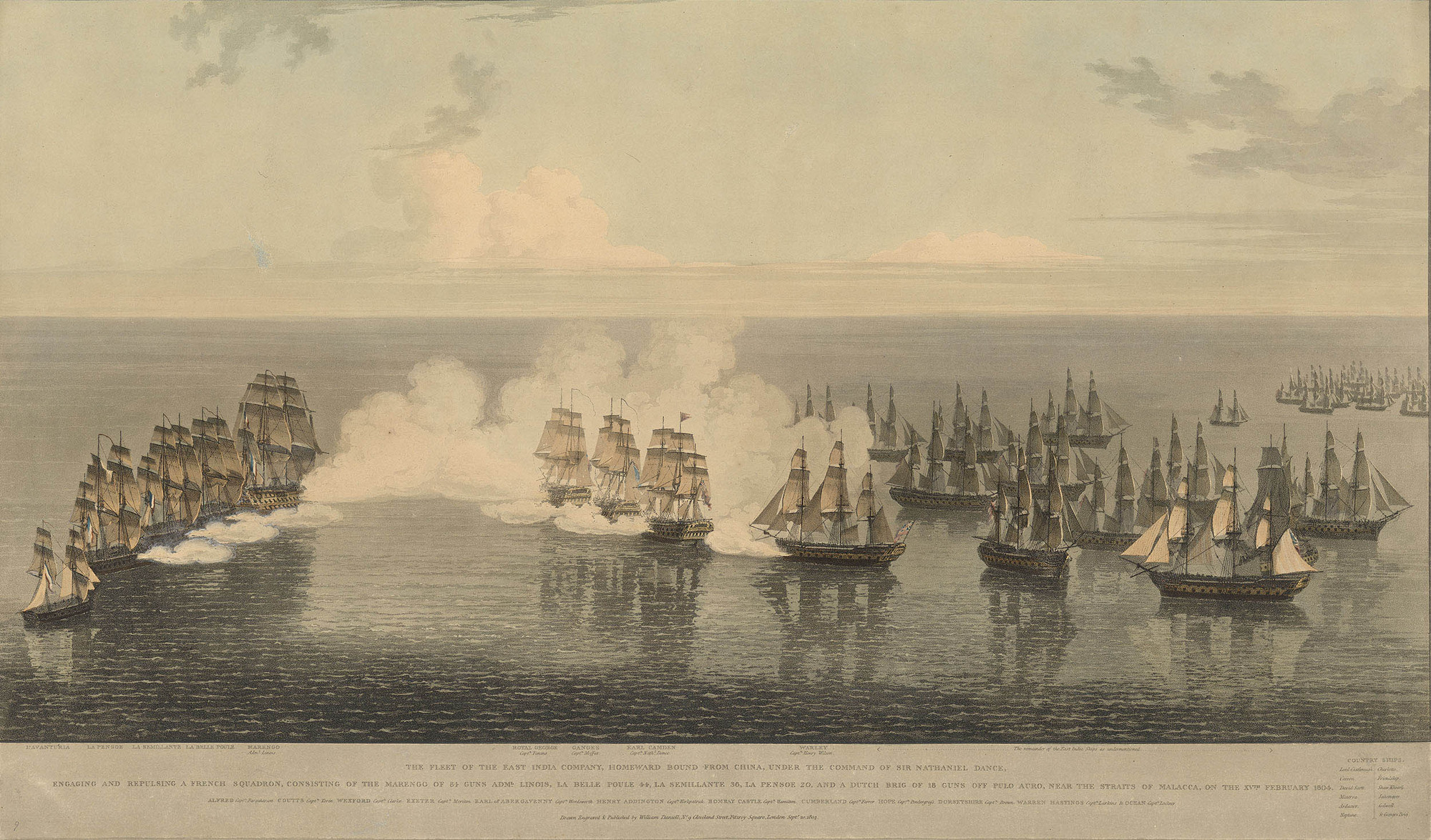
Battle of Pulo Aura - A small group of large ships on the left engages a line of ships on the right, which is protecting several smaller ships. Clouds of smoke hang over the fight as the ships fire their cannons.

== See also ==
- O'Byrne, William Richard (1849). "Fowler, Robert Merrick" . A Naval Biographical Dictionary . John Murray – via Wikisource.
