= Manor House Gardens =

Public park in Lee, London, England

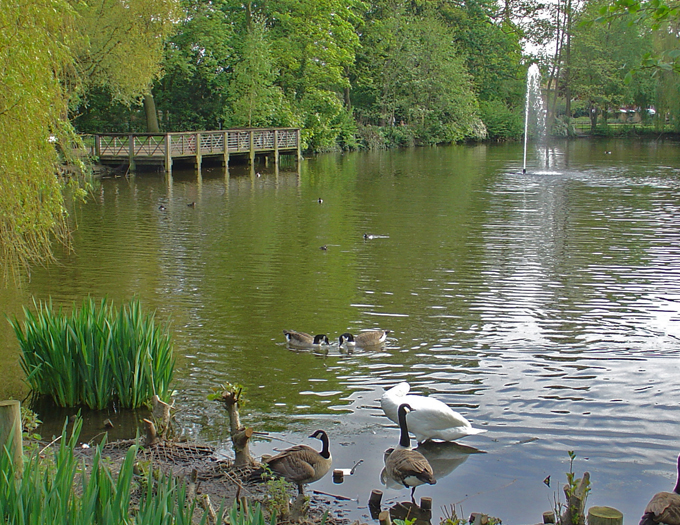
- The ornamental pond, island and viewing platform in Manor House Gardens, Lee
- Interactive map of Manor House Gardens
- Type: Public park
- Location: London, SE12; United Kingdom
- Coordinates: 51°27′22″N 0°00′22″E
- Area: 3.34 hectares (8 acres)
- Created: 1773 (private residence)
- Operator: London Borough of Lewisham
- Status: Open year round
- Public transit: Hither Green
- Website: themanorhousegardens.com

Manor House Gardens is a 3.34-hectare public park and gardens situated in Lee, in south east London. The park features a walled flower garden, ornamental pond, fountain, ice-house, cafeteria, children's playground, community garden, dog-walking area and tennis courts/multi-purpose sports pitches. There is also a Park Ranger's Office and information point adjacent to the cafe, and the River Quaggy flows from east to west across the southern part of the park.

The gardens date from the late eighteenth and early nineteenth centuries and much of the original layout remains. The gardens feature a large central lawn with a peripheral path with trees and shrubbery. An ornamental pond at the southern part features a small island and fountain.

The gardens are on the National Heritage List for England, Parks & Gardens.

== History ==
The gardens (along with a pond and ice-house) were formally laid out in around 1773 shortly after the main house had been built by Thomas Lucas (a merchant and treasurer of Guy's Hospital). The house was then purchased by Sir Francis Baring in 1796 from Mrs. Angerstein (the former Mrs. Lucas). Baring also bought the Manor of Lee, and the house was then known as the Manor House.

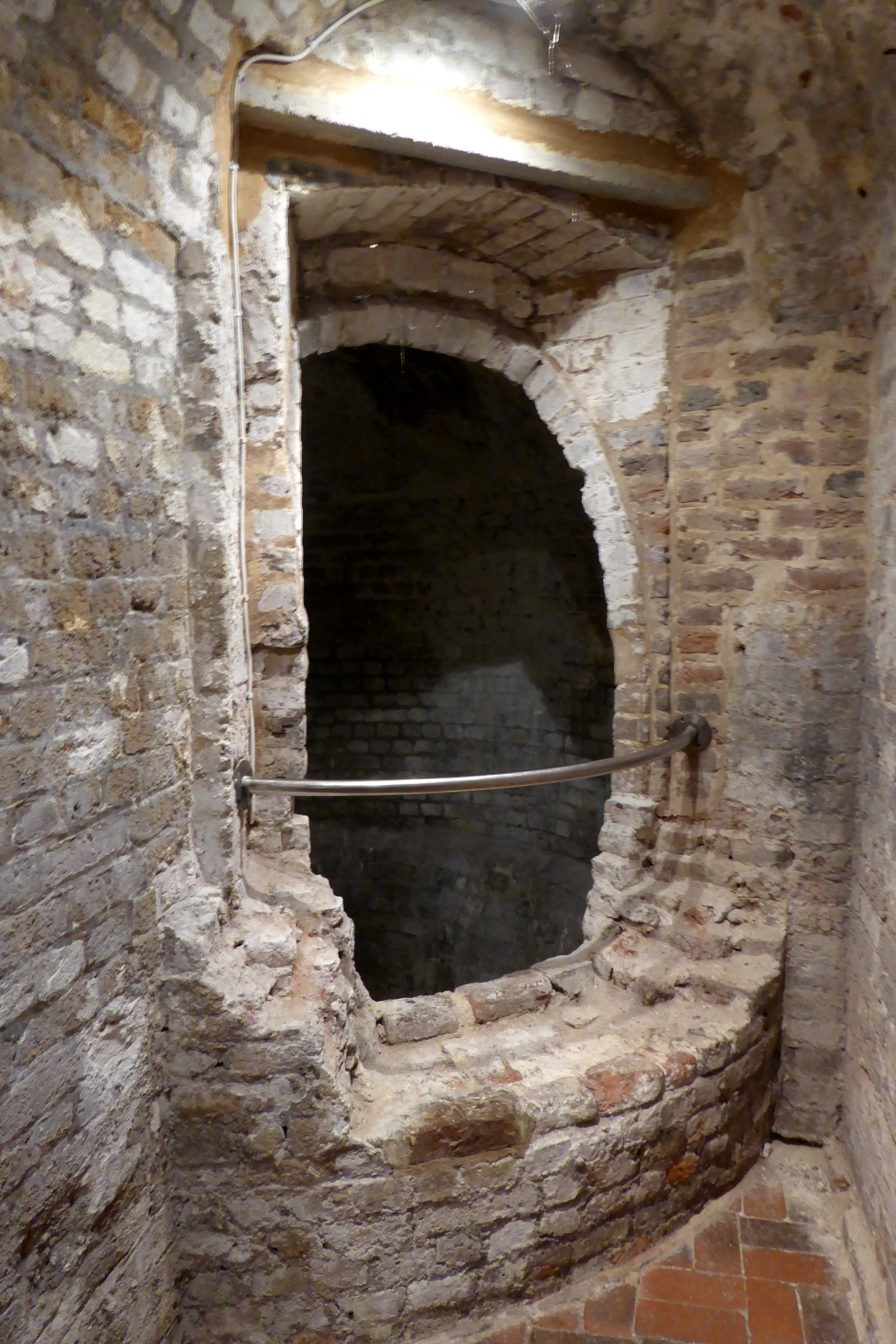
The ice well at Manor House Gardens

The house and gardens remained within the Baring family until 1898 when Sir Thomas Baring, 1st Earl of Northbrook sold the Manor House and estate to the London County Council for £8,835 (almost a million pounds as of 2015). The council noted that the property and grounds were in a 'somewhat neglected condition' and began a restoration project.

Restoration of the house and gardens were completed in 1902 and the gardens were opened to the general public on Whit Monday 19 May 1902. The Manor House, now a Grade II* listed building, became Lee Public Library. The gardens were a popular destination for locals and during the second world war air raid shelters were built within the grounds.

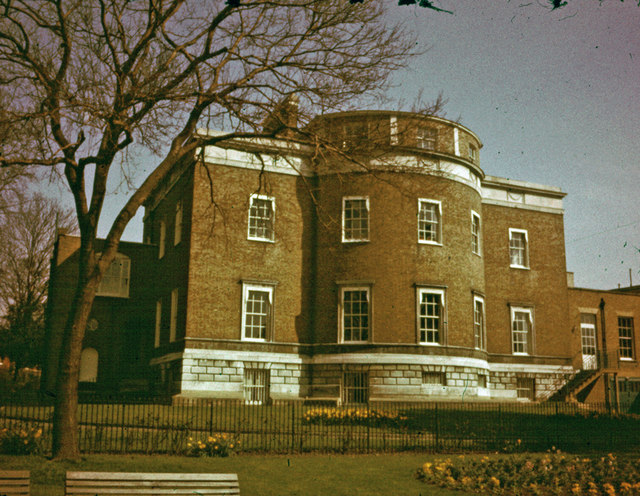
Rear elevation of the Manor House, a Grade II* listed building

In 1976 local residents set up the Lee Manor Society. The gardens were beginning to fall into decline as available budgets were being cut. With the dissolution of the Greater London Council in 1986, the gardens were transferred to the London Borough of Lewisham. The following year, on 16 October, the gardens suffered extensive damage from the Great Storm of 1987 with many mature trees being toppled.

By the early 1990s, the gardens and facilities were in serious decline and areas were fenced off from the public. The lack of maintenance led to areas of the park being overgrown and the lake became uninhabitable for marine life. In 1993, to campaign for the garden's renovation, local residents formed the Manor House Gardens Users' Group. The group spent the next few years campaigning for funds, and in 1997 they received a Heritage Lottery Fund award to renovate the gardens. The gardens and facilities were improved, and the gardens reopened in June 2000. A new bridge over the Quaggy River was built in 2003.

The Manor House itself received a further Heritage Lottery fund award and was renovated.

== Access ==
The gardens can be reached from several local roads: Old Road, Brightfield Road, Manor Lane and Taunton Road.

== Plants and Wildlife ==
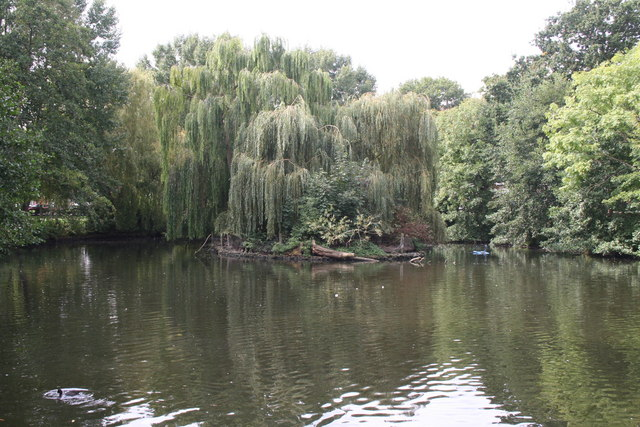
The lake and island within Manor House Gardens. Wild birds nest on the island.

The gardens feature oak, London plane, cypress, horse chestnut and weeping willow trees and are home to various birds: wren, kingfisher, great tit, rose-ringed parakeet and pigeons. Various areas are devoted to both natural and maintained areas with meadow buttercup, common mallow, ox-eye daisy in abundance. These plants have encouraged a number of butterflies: gatekeeper butterfly, painted lady, small white and red admiral.

The lake has numerous waterfowl: Canada goose, heron, coot and moorhen; as well as marine life in the form of ornamental goldfish.

Logs are set aside with the gardens as home for stag beetles.

== Other ==
The gardens host a farmers' market on the first three Saturdays of each month.
