= James William Freshfield =

English lawyer

Member of Parliament for Penryn
- In office 1830–1832
- Preceded by: William Manning; David Barclay
- Succeeded by: Constituency abolished

Member of Parliament for Penryn and Falmouth
- In office 1835–1841
- Preceded by: Robert Monsey Rolfe; Charles William Bury
- Succeeded by: John Cranch Walker Vivian; James Hanway Plumridge

Member of Parliament for Boston
- In office 1851–1852
- Preceded by: Benjamin Bond Cabbell; Hon. Dudley Pelham
- Succeeded by: Benjamin Bond Cabbell; Gilbert Heathcote

Member of Parliament for Penryn and Falmouth
- In office 1852–1857
- Preceded by: Howel Gwyn; Francis Mowatt
- Succeeded by: Thomas Baring; Samuel Gurney

Personal details
- Born: 8 April 1774
- Died: 27 June 1864 (aged 90)
- Party: Conservative
- Spouse(s): Mary Blacket (1799–1819); Jane Simms (1821–†)
- Children: Henry Ray Freshfield; Charles Kaye Freshfield
- Occupation: Lawyer

James William Freshfield (8 April 1774 – 27 June 1864) was an English lawyer and founder of the international law firm of Freshfields. He was also a Conservative politician and Member of Parliament, representing the seats of Penryn and Boston.

== Early life ==
Freshfield was born at Windsor, Berkshire, the eldest son of James Freshfield, a clockmaker of Holborn and later of Chertsey Surrey. He was initially apprenticed to a watchmaker, but became a solicitor, being articled to Thomas Tompson in July 1790. After reading the law, he was sworn in as attorney at the King's Bench on 8 June 1795 and in the Court of Common Pleas on 14 June 1795. He set up his own practice at first at Smithfield, London, but later joined Winter & Kaye, a well-established law firm, as a partner.

Freshfield had close connections with the Clapham Sect, a group of leading Evangelicals who held influential positions in the city and the legal profession. This may have helped his career. William Wilberforce, who became a prominent abolitionist, was one of the leading members of the sect. Freshfield was an active member of the Church Missionary Society, which was dedicated to the abolition of slavery and later became one of its trustees.

== Legal career ==
By 1811 the firm of Kaye & Freshfield had moved to New Bank Buildings.

Freshfield's home was at Stoke Newington, then north of London. The dwelling was known as Abney House, and was surrounded by parkland of the same name laid out by Lady Mary Abney and Dr Isaac Watts. One side of the estate ran along Church Street. The house was demolished in the nineteenth century, but its gates remain as the main entrance to the cemetery there. Freshfield lived next to Fleetwood House, where his neighbour and associate William Allen set up the Newington Academy for Girls in 1824.

He was an active member of the Lowtonian Society, standing for election to posts in the society in 1816 and giving a dinner for them when he was appointed joint solicitor to the Bank of England in 1819. This was a time of change in the banking system, and Freshfields were involved in a considerable amount of litigation. Freshfield was in correspondence with the Prime Minister, Lord Liverpool and more distressingly involved in litigation relating to misappropriation of Bank funds by the firm's partner Charles Kaye, which led to the resignation of the latter. Other important clients for whom he acted included Lord Carrington and Earl Stanhope.

Inevitably prior to the abolition of slavery in 1833 several of Freshfield's wealthier clients owned estates in the Caribbean and so conflicts arose with his anti-slavery convictions. Marriage settlements could be administered by solicitors over more than one generation, and it was as a trustee of one such settlement that Freshfield and his fellow trustee Alexander Baillie found themselves in 1827 temporarily the owners of fifteen slaves from an estate on Union Island. In one instance the firm tried to claim unpaid legal fees through the government scheme set up to compensate owners after abolition. Such situations have led to allegations that Freshfield profited from slavery in spite of his principles.

In 1829 the firm was involved in handling the divorce case concerning Lady Ellenborough, a society scandal of the time.

== Political activities ==
Freshfield was invited to stand for Parliament in Penryn in 1825, and 1826 and was elected Member of Parliament for Penryn in 1830, but lost his seat in the 'Reform' election of 1832. After the Reform Act he was elected Conservative member for the new constituency of Penryn and Falmouth. After losing the seat in 1840 he contested Wycombe unsuccessfully in 1841, and was out of Parliament for 10 years.

In 1842, he was called to the bar at Gray's Inn. In 1847 he contested the City of London unsuccessfully and in 1848 he stood at Derby. He was eventually returned for Boston, which he represented in 1851 and 1852. He then sat for Penryn and Falmouth again until he retired in 1857 at the age of 85 years. One of his most significant roles was as Chairman of the Divorce Committee in 1856 and 1857. Two reforming measures were credited to James Freshfield in the Law Times Obituary.

"While practising as a solicitor, he was the main instrument in the alteration of the law, so important to the commercial interests of London, by which the dealings of merchants and factors entrusted with goods by foreigners were legalised and made valid. While in Parliament, he originated and carried through the measure for reforming and equalising the principle of assessment of the parishes in the metropolitan counties. "

Freshfield was a JP for Sussex, Middlesex, the City of London and Surrey, and he became High Sheriff of Surrey for 1850. He was Deputy Lieutenant for Middlesex and Surrey and Chairman of the East Quarter sessions in Surrey. In 1852, he chaired a dinner at the Spread Eagle, Epsom on the foundation of Epsom College, and was described as a firm friend of the school. He was also sometime Joint Treasurer of the Corporation of the Sons of the Clergy. As well as being Solicitor to the Bank of England for 20 years from 1820 to 1840, he also acted for many of the great dock and other commercial companies in London. He was connected with mining and agricultural interests in South America. He died at the age of 90 years.

== Family ==
Freshfield married Mary Blacket, the third child of John Blacket, a slopseller of Smithfield, and his wife Abigail Luccock, at St Clement Danes in 1799. (Mary's nephew Edmund Blacket became a celebrated architect in Australia.) Their sons, James William, Henry and Charles, all became solicitors in the practice. Mary died in 1819 and Freshfield married again in 1821, to Frances James Sims, eldest daughter of John Sims of Walthamstow, Essex. The last member of the Freshfield family retired from the firm in 1927.

Parliament of the United Kingdom
Preceded by William Manning; David Barclay	Member of Parliament for Penryn; 1830–1832; With: Sir Charles Lemon, Bt	Constituency abolished
Preceded by Robert Rolfe; Lord Tullamore	Member of Parliament for Penryn and Falmouth; 1835–1841; With: Sir Robert Rolfe 1835–1840; Edward John Hutchins 1849–1841	Succeeded by John Vivian; James Hanway Plumridge
Preceded by Benjamin Bond Cabbell; Hon. Dudley Pelham	Member of Parliament for Boston; 1851–1852; With: Benjamin Bond Cabbell	Succeeded by Benjamin Bond Cabbell; Gilbert Heathcote
Preceded by Howel Gwyn; Francis Mowatt	Member of Parliament for Penryn and Falmouth; 1852–1857; With: Howel Gwyn	Succeeded by Thomas Baring; Samuel Gurney
Honorary titles
Preceded by William Farmer	High Sheriff of Surrey; 1840	Succeeded by John Sparkes
