= Courtenay Mansel =

Welsh landowner, farmer, barrister and politician

Courtenay Mansel

Sir Courtenay Cecil Mansel, 13th Baronet (25 February 1880 – 4 January 1933) was a Welsh landowner and farmer, barrister and Liberal Party politician who later joined the Conservatives.

== Family ==
Courtenay Cecil Mansel was the son of Sir Richard Mansel, 12th Baronet Mansel of Muddlescombe in Carmarthenshire. The Mansel Baronets date back to the early 17th century. When his father died in 1892, Courtenay was considered to have succeeded as the 13th Baronet and held the title for eleven years. However it was discovered that the first marriage of his grandparents in Scotland (there was a later one in England) was not invalid as had been thought and that his uncle Colonel Edward Berkely Mansel, not his father Richard Mansel, should have succeeded to the title in 1883. He therefore stood aside and allowed his uncle to bear the title. Edward Mansel died in 1908 without children and Courtenay Mansel once again succeeded to the baronetcy.

The branch of the family which inherited the Mansel baronetcy had the surname Philipps. Courtenay reverted to this name after he relinquished the title and married Mary Philippa Agnes Germaine Littlewood under this name in 1906. They had three sons and eight daughters. Lady Mansel died in 1958.

== Education ==
Mansel was educated at Harrow School.

== Career ==
Mansel went in for the law and was called to the Bar at the Middle Temple in 1918. During the First World War, Mansel served in the Royal Flying Corps and later transferred to the newly formed Royal Air Force leaving with the rank of captain. He later served as a Justice of the Peace for the counties of Carmarthenshire and Cardiganshire.

== Politics ==
=== 1908-1912 ===
Mansel was considered as prospective Liberal candidate for two Welsh seats before he eventually stood for Parliament in 1918. In 1908, the sitting Liberal MP for Swansea, George Newnes, announced his intention to stand down at the next election and Mansel was publicly mentioned as a possible successor. In the end the Liberal Association chose Alfred Mond to fight the seat. In 1910 he was considered one of the front runners for the Liberal nomination in West Carmarthenshire but he lost out to John Hinds. In 1912, a vacancy arose in East Carmarthenshire and Mansel was among those contesting the Liberal nomination. His aristocratic and landowning background told against him however in a strongly non-conformist constituency, which at that time included the industrial town of Llanelli.

=== 1918 ===
Mansel did not therefore fight a Parliamentary election until the 1918 when he stood as Liberal candidate for Coventry. Rather to his chagrin, having attended on Prime Minister David Lloyd George at a special meeting at Number 10 Downing Street Mansel was not awarded the Coalition coupon. This was bestowed instead upon the Conservative candidate Edward Manville. The election was contested by five candidates in all. Mansel aced an Independent Liberal candidate, David Marshall Mason the previous MP as well as Labour and another Independent. In what was essentially a two-horse race between Conservative and Labour candidates, Mansel came in third but scored only 10% of the vote and lost his deposit.

=== 1922 ===
In 1922, Mansel was adopted as the Liberal candidate for the Cornish seat of Penryn and Falmouth. He faced a four-cornered contest at the 1922 general election. In addition to Conservative and Labour opponents he also faced a Lloyd George National Liberal, the former MP for Truro, George Hay Morgan, the Truro seat having been abolished in boundary changes. Mansel finished in second place with 32% of the poll, behind the Conservative candidate, Captain Denis Shipwright who obtained 43%. Labour were third with 16.5% and Morgan came bottom of the poll with 8% and lost his deposit.

=== 1923 ===
At the next general election which took place in 1923, Mansel again contested Penryn and Falmouth but this time in a straight fight with Shipwright. The reunion of the Lloyd George and Asquithian wings of the Liberal Party around the traditional Liberal policy of Free Trade resulted in a surge of support for Liberal candidates and Mansel was returned with a majority of 6,586 votes.

=== 1924 ===
By the time of the 1924, however, the Conservative vote had revived. The Labour Party also decided to stand a candidate in the 1924 general election in Penryn and Falmouth thus splitting the anti-Tory vote. As a result, Mansel lost his seat to the new Tory candidate, George Pilcher, with Labour in third place. The combined Liberal and Labour vote amounted to 57% of the poll and in a straight fight Mansel could well have retained the seat.

=== Political orientation ===
Perhaps unsurprisingly for a member of the British aristocracy, a landowner who had been to one of the top public schools in England, Mansel's views were not those associated with the radical tradition in the Liberal Party. He favoured the traditional Gladstonian approach of unfettered Free Trade and retrenchment or economy in government finance. For example, when he was asked for his views on placing a legal limit of 48 hours per week for working men, he replied that hours of work should be left to negotiation between "master and man".

=== Leaving the Liberals ===
In 1926, Sir Alfred Mond the Liberal MP for Carmarthen defected from the Liberal Party to the Conservatives, following a profound disagreement with Lloyd George over the party's agricultural and land policy. In October 1925 the party had published the report Land and the Nation. The report, which came also to be known as the Green Book, set out radical proposals to improve the position of the rural poor. Controversially it proposed to end private ownership of agricultural land, turning farmers into so-called 'cultivating tenants' who would be supervised by county agricultural committees. These policies provoked strong opposition inside the Liberal Party, with many Liberals, Sir Alfred Mond being a leading dissident. A colleague of Mansel's in South West England, Maxwell Ruthven Thornton the former Liberal MP for Tavistock in Devon also resigned from the party over the Green Book believing its contents were tantamount to socialism.

In the interests of unity, the Liberal Party took steps to modify the Green Book proposals after the initial furore but Mond had decided to go. Carmarthen Liberals were therefore looking to adopt a new candidate and they turned to Mansel whose family home, Maesycrugiau Manor, was in the county. Mansel had retained strong links with Carmarthenshire Liberalism and was also a prominent member of the local branch of the National Farmers' Union. Mansel turned them down on the grounds that he was committed to his Penryn and Falmouth seat but he also expressed severe doubts about the Green Book policies, even as amended, saying they were incompatible with the tenets of Liberalism and echoing Mond's description of the report's approach as socialist. Mansel soon followed Mond into the Tory Party.

=== Carmarthen by-election, 1928 ===
Mond continued to sit for Carmarthen, now as a Conservative, until 1928 when he was given a peerage and went to the House of Lords as the first Baron Melchett. This caused a by-election in Carmarthen and Mansel was chosen by the Conservative Party as their candidate. In a tight contest the Liberal candidate William Nathaniel Jones won by the narrow majority of 47 votes over Labour's Daniel Hopkin. Mansel came bottom of the poll with just under 30% of the poll.

=== University of Wales seat ===
Mansel made one final effort to re-enter the House of Commons. At the 1929 general election he contested the University of Wales seat for the Conservatives. He came third in a three-cornered contest which was won comfortably for the Liberals by Ernest Evans.

== Death ==
Mansel died suddenly on 4 January 1933 aged 54 years. He was succeeded as 16th Baronet by his eldest son John Philip Ferdinand Mansel (1910–1947).

== Publications ==
Mansel published two books of poems.

- The Masque of King Charles VI and other poems; John Ouseley, London 1912
- The South Wind; Allen & Unwin, London 1923

Parliament of the United Kingdom
Preceded by Denis Shipwright	Member of Parliament for Penryn and Falmouth; 1923 – 1924	Succeeded by George Pilcher
Baronetage of England
Preceded by Richard Mansel	Baronet (of Muddlescombe); 1892–1903	Succeeded by Edward Berkeley Mansel
Preceded by Edward Berkeley Mansel	Baronet (of Muddlescombe); 1908–1933	Succeeded by John Philip Ferdinand Mansel
