= HMS Crocus (1808) =

Brig-sloop of the Royal Navy

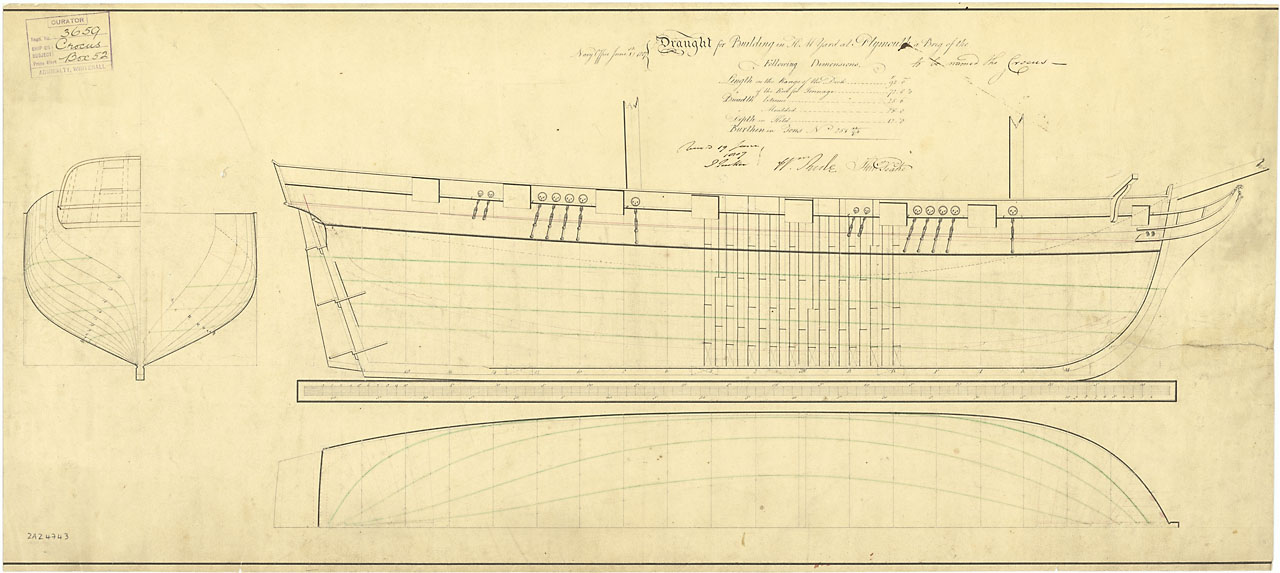
- Crocus

History

United Kingdom
- Name: HMS Crocus
- Ordered: 30 March 1807
- Builder: Plymouth Dockyard (M/s Joseph Tucker)
- Laid down: November 1807
- Launched: 10 June 1808
- Fate: Sold 1815

United Kingdom
- Name: Crocus
- Owner: Donovan
- Acquired: 1815 by purchase
- Fate: Last listed 1823

General characteristics
- Class & type: Crocus-class brig-sloop
- Tons burthen: 250, or 25562/94, or 260 (bm)
- Length: 92 ft 1 1/2 in (28.1 m) (gundeck); 73 ft 5 1/4 in (22.4 m) (keel)
- Beam: 25 ft 7 in (7.8 m)
- Depth of hold: 12 ft 8 in (3.9 m)
- Sail plan: Brig rigged
- Complement: 86
- Armament: 2 × 6-pounder bow chasers; 12 × 24-pounder carronades

HMS Crocus was the nameship of the Crocus-class brig-sloops of the Royal Navy. She was launched in 1808 and had an almost completely uneventful career until she was sold in 1815. She then became a merchantman trading with the West Indies and the Mediterranean. She was last listed in 1823.

== Career ==
The Times reported on 14 May 1808 that "the Crocus, a beautiful brig of 18 guns, built by the apprentices of this port [Plymouth]", would be launched on 25 May. She was actually launched a few weeks later.

Commander Robert Merrick Fowler commissioned Crocus in August for the North Sea. (Note: In 1804 Fowler had been returning home on an East Indiaman from Australia after the loss of his ship, HMS Porpoise. He distinguished himself in a variety of capacities during the Battle of Pulo Aura. The Company had rewarded him for his role with 300 guineas to purchase a piece of plate. Lloyd's Patriotic Fund awarded him a suitably inscribed sword worth 50 guineas.)

On 19 February 1809, Crocus, Trompeuse, and the brig-sloop Rolla were in company when Rolla recaptured the American ship Factor. Factor, of New York, Johnstone, master, had been sailing from Tenerife when the privateer captured her the day before between Beachy Head and Dungeness. The British sent her into Dover. The same privateer had also captured a brig, which the excise cutter Lively had recaptured and sent into the Downs.

Crocus participated in the ill-fated Walcheren Campaign. Starting on 30 July 1809, a British armed force of 39,000 men landed on Walcheren. However, the French fleet had left Flushing (Vlissingen) and sailed to Antwerp, and the British lost over 4,000 men to "Walcheren Fever", a combination of malaria and typhus, and to enemy action. As the strategic reasons for the campaign dissipated and conditions worsened, the British force withdrew in December. Prize money arising from the net proceeds of the property captured at Walcheren and the adjacent islands in the Scheld was paid in October 1812.

Fowler transferred to Charybdis on 18 September 1809. Commander the Honourable William Walpole recommissioned Crocus in October. She then cruised the Channel. Three months later Commander Richard Buck replaced him. Buck sailed her for the Mediterranean on 19 December.

On 19 January 1810, Crocus recaptured Selberen. By 11 June Crocus was back in Britain as on the 11th a midshipman from Crocus underwent court martial on board Salvador del Mundo in the Hamoaze. The charge was that he had deserted while Crocus was off Land's End when he had been sent with a boat's crew to retrieve sand for scrubbing the deck. The court sentenced him to two years' imprisonment in the Marshalsea, to be mulcted of all his pay, to be declared unworthy and incapable of ever serving as an officer in his Majesty's navy and, at the expiration of his imprisonment, to serve before the mast. The court ordered a seaman who had also seized the same opportunity to desert to 200 lashes. The seaman had made mutinous statements to the purser and First Lieutenant on Crocus when they caught him.

Crocus captured Triton, Thompson, master, in early January 1810. Triton had been sailing from New York to Tonningen before Crocus sent her into Plymouth.

Serbere, Tamansin, master, arrived at Falmouth on 20 January 1810. She had been sailing from Alicante to London when a 10-gun French privateer had captured her on the 18th. Then in May Crocus escorted to Portsmouth HMS Tromp, which had been serving as a guardship at Falmouth.

In November 1810 Commander John Bellamy recommissioned Crocus at Portsmouth, for the Mediterranean. While Crocus was in Portsmouth, a 16-year-old Marine fell overboard on 14 November. His floating body was immediately retrieved but efforts to revive him failed.

Although Bellamy had recommissioned Crocus, this apparently occurred while Buck was on leave. Buck remained in command until he was promoted to post captain on 3 April 1811.

Commander Arden Adderley assumed command in May 1811 and recommissioned her in September.

On 3 February 1812 Powhattan, Parrott, master, arrived at Malta. She had been sailing from New York when Crocus detained her. On 4 September Crocus captured the French privateer settee Formica, of two guns and 25 men. She was three months out of Genoa but had not made any captures. Her crew escaped in the boats to the Barbary shore. Later prize money reports gave the privateer's name as Fournie and the head-money count as 36 men. (Note: A first-class share of the proceeds was worth £36 18s 0 3/4d; a sixth-class share, that of an ordinary seaman, was worth £1 3s 1 3/4d.)

On 2 January 1813, Crocus and Minorca captured San Nicolo. (Note: A first-class share of the prize money was worth £265 18s 8d; a sixth-class share was worth £7 10s 0d. Some costs were allocated equitably and were to be deducted at time of payment.)

Powhattan, Parrott, master, arrived at Malta on 3 February 1814. She was from New York and Crocus had detained her off Cagliari.

Adderley received promotion to post captain on 19 July 1814. However, on 7 June 1814 James Hanway Plumridge was promoted to commander in Crocus, but within a month was transferred to command of Philomel. Commander John Stoddard then recommissioned her in July.

Disposal: Crocus was paid off in November 1814. The Admiralty then listed her for sale at Sheerness on 9 February 1815. She finally sold on 31 August for £830.

== Crocus ==
Crocus became a merchantman. Crocus, of 260 tons (bm), launched at Plymouth in 1808, appeared in Lloyd's Register for 1815 with Donovan, master and owner, and trade London–West Indies. In 1820 her trade was London–Malta. Donovan was still master and owner. Crocus was last listed in Lloyd's Register and the Register of Shipping in 1823.
