= Evelyn King (politician) =

British politician (1907–1994)

Member of Parliament for South Dorset
- In office 15 October 1964 – 7 April 1979
- Preceded by: Guy Barnett
- Succeeded by: Robert Gascoyne-Cecil

Member of Parliament for Penryn and Falmouth
- In office 5 July 1945 – 3 February 1950
- Preceded by: Maurice Petherick
- Succeeded by: constituency abolished

Personal details
- Born: 30 May 1907
- Died: 14 April 1994 (aged 86)
- Party: Conservative (after 1951)
- Other political affiliations: Labour (until 1951)

Evelyn Mansfield King (30 May 1907 – 14 April 1994) was a British politician. He was a member of parliament for both the Labour Party and then the Conservative Party.

== Biography ==
The son of Harry Percy King and Winifred Elizabeth née Paulet, King was educated at Cheltenham College and King's College, Cambridge (where he was the university's correspondent to the Sunday Times, 1928–30). He then entered the Inner Temple, London. He was Assistant Master at Bedford School, taught at Craigend Park School, and became Headmaster and Warden of Clayesmore School, 1935–1950. He revitalised a financially failing Clayesmore, bringing with him some pupils from Craigend Park, and managing the school in an energetic and proactive way, putting it on the Headmasters' Conference List, and generally on the map. During World War II he served in the Gloucestershire Regiment from 1940 and was promoted Acting Lieutenant-Colonel in 1941.

King was originally Labour Party member of parliament for Penryn and Falmouth from 1945 to 1950, and served as Parliamentary Secretary at the Ministry of Town and Country Planning 1947 to 1950. When his constituency was abolished for the 1950 general election he contested Poole in 1950 but lost.

King defected to the Conservative Party in 1951 and contested Southampton Itchen in 1959. In 1964, he stood in South Dorset and unseated Labour's Guy Barnett, who had gained the seat in a by-election two years earlier.

He was a member of parliamentary delegations to Bermuda and Washington, D.C. in 1946, Tokyo 1947, Cairo and the Middle East 1967, Jordan and the Persian Gulf 1968, Kenya and the Seychelles 1969, Malta 1970 (leader), and Malawi 1971 (leader). He was a member of the Select Committee on Overseas Aid in 1971, and Chairman of the Food Committee 1971–73. King served as MP for South Dorset until he retired in 1979.

King was a long-standing member of the Primrose League, and a vice-president of the Conservative Monday Club from about 1974 until his death in 1994 aged 86.

== Publications ==
- King, Evelyn, with J. C. Trewin, Printer to The House – biography of Luke Hansard. London, 1952.

Parliament of the United Kingdom
Preceded by Maurice Petherick	Member of Parliament for Penryn & Falmouth; 1945 – 1950	Constituency abolished
Preceded by Guy Barnett	Member of Parliament for South Dorset; 1964 – 1979	Succeeded by Viscount Cranborne
