= David James Jenkins =

Welsh shipowner and Liberal Party politician

David James Jenkins (15 April 1824 - 26 February 1891) was a Welsh shipowner and Liberal Party politician who sat in the House of Commons from 1874 to 1886.

Jenkins was the third son of John Jenkins of Haverfordwest (c.1786-1854) and his wife Mary Evans daughter of John Evans. He was educated at Teignmouth Grammar School. He served for several years in the merchant navy and in 1854 and 1855 commanded a troop ship in the Baltic. In 1860, he founded the firm of Jenkins & Co in London which began owning ships in 1861 and sailed mainly to India and the Far East.

He contested Harwich at the 1868 general election, without success. At the 1874 general election Jenkins was elected as a Member of Parliament (MP) for Penryn and Falmouth. He held the seat until the 1886 general election, when he was defeated by the Conservative Party candidate William Cavendish-Bentinck.

Jenkins died in Torquay at the age of 66.

== Family ==
Jenkins married firstly Bessie Howe, daughter of Rev. John Howe of Cork, in 1851; and secondly Alice Nash, daughter of Goodwin Nash of Malvern Wells on 23 August 1877. Alice was a niece of Sir Francis Lycett.

Both of Jenkins`s older brothers were distinguished Wesleyan Methodist Ministers: the Rev. Dr. John Jenkins (1813-1898); and the Rev Ebenezer Evans Jenkins (1820-1905) - who was president of the W.M. Conference in 1880.

His eldest brother`s son Edward Jenkins was a barrister, novelist and MP for Dundee.

Parliament of the United Kingdom
| Preceded by Sir Robert Nicholas Fowler; Edward Eastwick | Member of Parliament for Penryn and Falmouth; 1874 – 1886; With: Henry Thomas Cole 1874–80; Reginald Brett 1880–85 | Succeeded by William Cavendish-Bentinck |
