= George Pilcher (MP) =

British politician and journalist

George Pilcher (26 February 1882 - 8 December 1962) was a British journalist and politician, who served as the Conservative MP for Penryn and Falmouth in 1924–29, and as a member of the Indian Central Legislative Assembly in 1924.

== Early career ==
Pilcher was born in Folkestone, the son of Walter Pilcher, a grocer. He was educated at Kent College, Canterbury, and then at Wadham College, Oxford, where he studied modern history. He then trained as a barrister, qualifying at the Inner Temple.

In 1907, he joined the Morning Post, first working as the private secretary to the editor, Fabian Ware, and then becoming foreign editor in 1909. While with the Post, he reported extensively from overseas, including with the Ottoman army in the First Balkan War. He then moved to India in 1914, where he became joint editor of the Statesman, as well as a foreign correspondent for the Post. At the Statesman, he reported from the Waziristan campaign of 1920 and the royal tour of 1921.

== Political career ==
In 1924, Pilcher was elected to the Central Legislative Assembly, the Indian colonial parliament. He was one of the two members representing the "European" constituency in the Bengal Presidency. He resigned the seat in August.

Later that year, in the 1924 United Kingdom general election, he returned to the UK where he was elected for Penryn and Falmouth as a Conservative, defeating the incumbent Liberal. During his time in the Commons, he was involved in overseas affairs, part of a delegation visiting Brazil in 1927, and the British delegation to the 1928 Empire Parliamentary Conference in Canada. After standing down at the 1929 United Kingdom general election (he did not seek re-election), he became secretary of the Royal Empire Society, retiring from that post in 1935. His successor as Conservative candidate for Penryn and Falmouth in 1929, Maurice Petherick, was defeated by the Liberal, Tudor Walters.
