= Frederick Horniman =

British politician (1835–1906)

F.J.Horniman

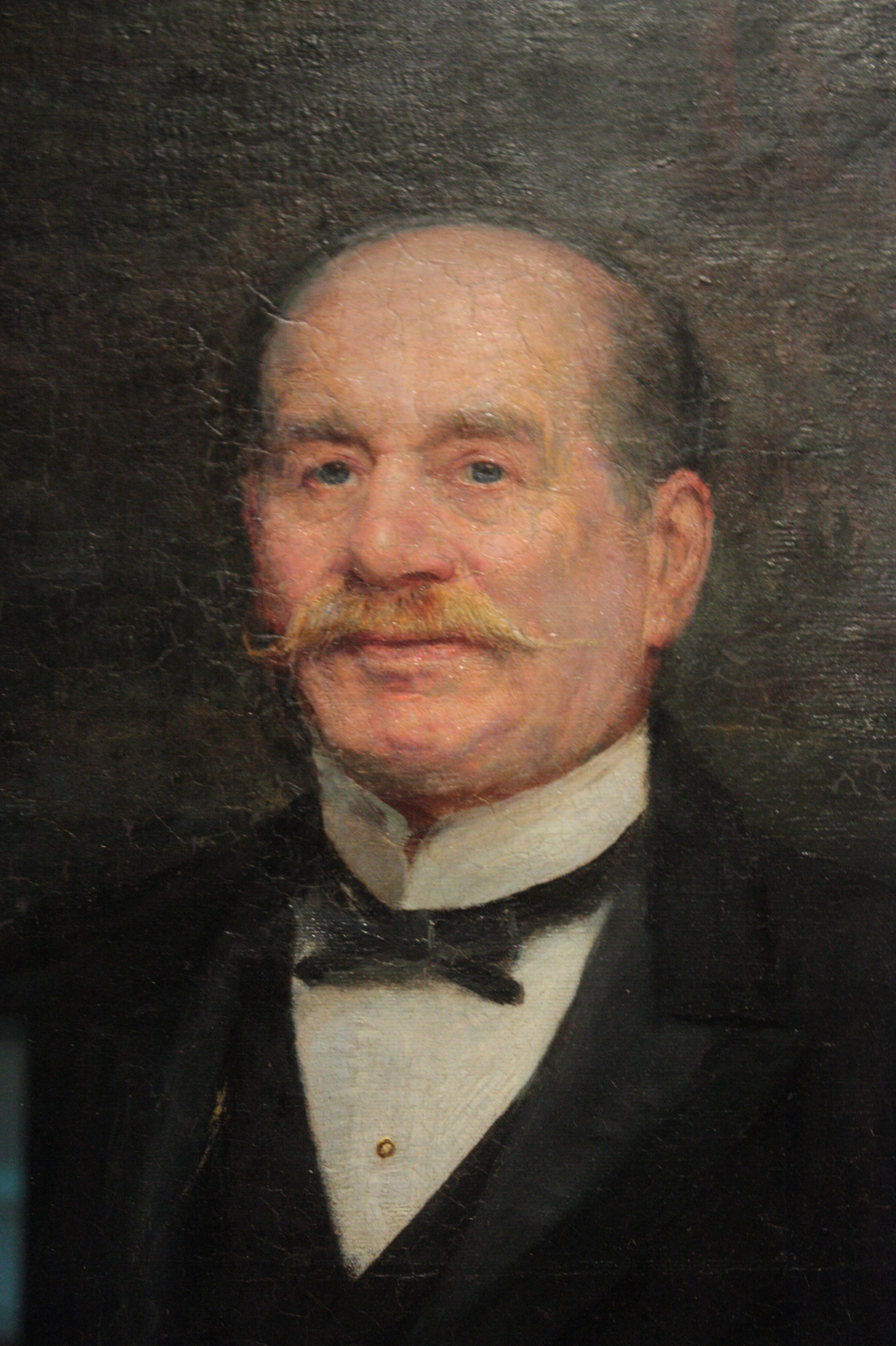
Frederick Horniman by Trevor Haddon (detail)

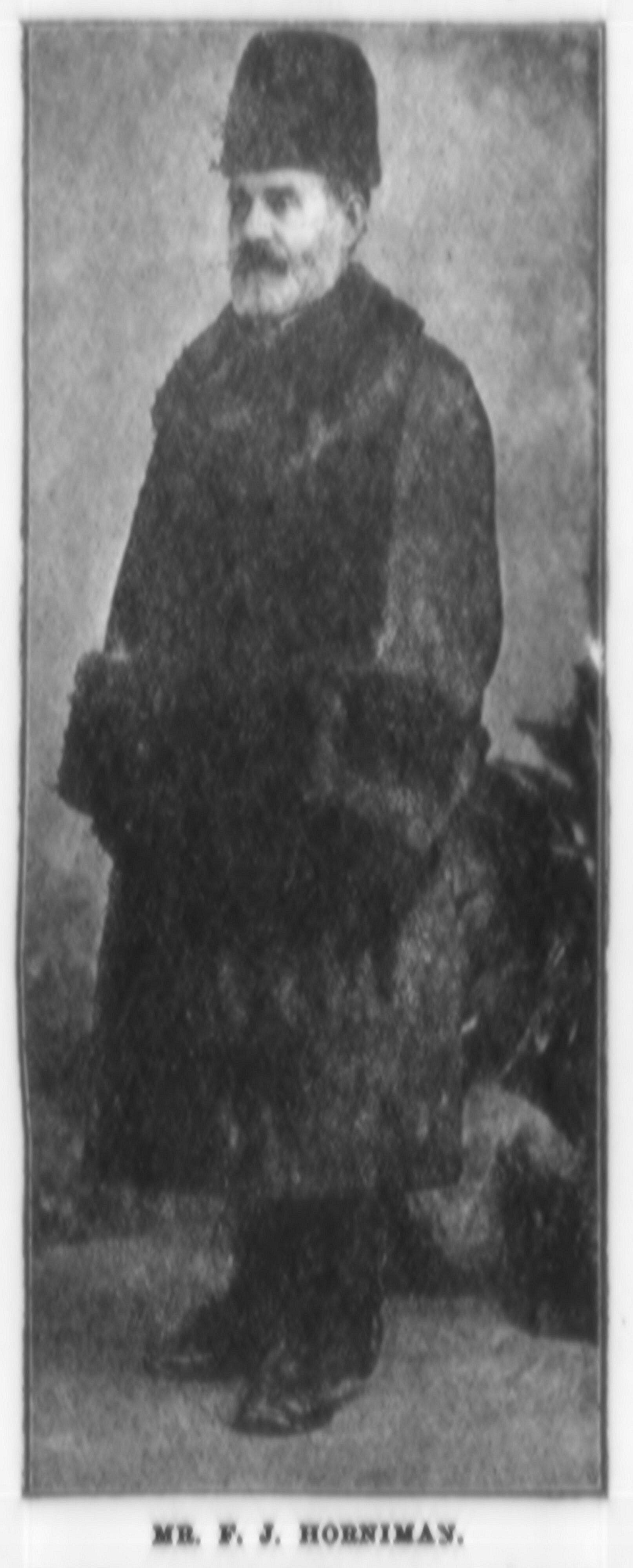
Frederick J. Horniman

Frederick John Horniman (8 October 1835 – 5 March 1906) was an English tea trader and founder of the Horniman Museum in London. He was brought up and lived in Croydon's Park Hill area.

== Life ==
Frederick, born in Bridgwater, Somerset, was born into a Quaker family, the son of John Horniman, who established Horniman's Tea, a tea business using mechanical packaging. By 1891, it was said to be the biggest tea company in the world.

He founded the Horniman Museum in Forest Hill, south London. In 1901, he gave the 15 acres (6.1 ha) freehold estate, museum and the art and natural history collections to London County Council for use by the people of London.

He was a member of the London County Council, and Liberal member of parliament for Penryn and Falmouth in Cornwall from 1895 until 1906.

In 1859 he married Rebekah Emslie (1825–1895). Their son Emslie John Horniman (1863–1932) was Liberal MP for Chelsea (1906–10). He continued to develop the museum, and was a noted art collector and patron in his own right, who rebuilt his homes at Burford Priory in Oxfordshire (under Walter Godfrey) and at Garden Corner, Chelsea (under C.F.A. Voysey). Their daughter, Annie Horniman (1860–1937), worked in theatre, being a founder of the Abbey Theatre, Dublin.

His first wife died in 1895, and in 1897 he married Minnie Louisa Bennett; they had two daughters.

Parliament of the United Kingdom
Preceded by William George Cavendish-Bentinck	Member of Parliament for Penryn and Falmouth; 1895–1906	Succeeded by Sir John Barker
