= Henry Thomas Cole =

English politician (1816–1885)

Henry Thomas Cole MP QC

Member of Parliament for Penryn and Falmouth
- In office 6 February 1874 – 2 April 1880 Serving with David James Jenkins
- Preceded by: Robert Fowler; Edward Backhouse Eastwick
- Succeeded by: David James Jenkins; Reginald Brett

Personal details
- Born: 1816 Bath, Somerset
- Died: 5 January 1885 (aged 68) Kensington, London
- Party: Liberal
- Spouse: Georgina Stone (m. 1846)
- Children: 10
- Parent(s): George Cole; Sally Crozier

Henry Thomas Cole QC (1816 – 5 January 1885) was a Liberal Party politician.

Laycock was elected Liberal MP for Penryn and Falmouth in 1874, but stood down at the next election in 1880.

Cole became a barrister in 1842, entering Middle Temple, and later became a Queen's Counsel in 1867. He was also Recorder of Penzance from 1862 to 1872, and Recorder of Plymouth and Devonport.

Parliament of the United Kingdom
Preceded by Robert Fowler; Edward Eastwick	Member of Parliament for Penryn and Falmouth; 1874–1880; With: David James Jenkins	Succeeded by David James Jenkins; Reginald Brett
