= Edward John Hutchins =

Edward John Hutchins (27 December 1809 in Briton Ferry, Glamorganshire – 11 February 1876 in Hastings) was a Liberal MP, railway director and Freemason.

== Birth and education ==
Hutchins was the son of Edward Hutchins of Gloucester and his wife, Sarah Guest, a sister of the MP and ironfounder Sir Josiah John Guest. He was educated at Charterhouse School and St John's College, Cambridge.

== In Parliament ==
Hutchins was elected as an MP for Penryn and Falmouth in January 1840 with a majority of 221 and sat until the general election of 1841. His opponent was the Conservative, Mr Carne, who polled 238 votes.

At the 1841 general election, he unsuccessfully contested Southampton; and although his opponents were subsequently unseated on petition, he did not obtain the seat.

He was unsuccessful once again in July 1847 when he attempted to become the member for Poole.

Finally he was returned for Lymington at a by-election, in April 1850. He held the seat until his retirement from Parliament in 1857.

In 1870, he was part of a Catholic Lobby group concerning the Education Bill. He was a member of the London School Board representing Marylebone from 1870 - 1873.

== Civic duties ==
He was a magistrate and deputy-lieutenant for Glamorganshire, and a magistrate for Brecon and Monmouthshire.

== Business interests ==
After Cambridge, Hutchins joined his uncle, Sir John Josiah Guest, running the family business, the Dowlais Iron Works. In 1851, Hutchins became the Chairman of the Rhymney Iron Works, holding the chairmanship until 1875.

Also in 1875, he resigned as a director of the London and South Western Railway, having served for several years.

He was chairman of the Taff Valley Wagon Company.

== Marriage ==
On 10 October 1838, in Baltimore, Maryland he married Isabel Clara, daughter of the Chevalier Don Juan de Bernaben, of Alicante, in Spain, who survived him.

== Masonic role ==
He was Provincial Grand Master of South Wales from 1848 to 1856

== Death ==
He died after a lingering illness in Hastings.

Parliament of the United Kingdom
Preceded by Sir Robert Rolfe; James William Freshfield	Member of Parliament for Penryn and Falmouth; 1840–1841; With: James William Freshfield	Succeeded by John Vivian; James Hanway Plumridge
Preceded by William Alexander Mackinnon; Hon. George Keppel	Member of Parliament for Lymington; 1850–1857; With: William Alexander Mackinnon 1850–52; Sir John Rivett-Carnac 1852–57	Succeeded by Sir John Rivett-Carnac; William Alexander Mackinnon
