= James Hanway Plumridge =

Royal Navy Admiral (1787–1863)

Admiral Sir James Hanway Plumridge KCB
- Born: 13 March 1787; Mayfair, London, England
- Died: 29 November 1863 (aged 76); Hopton-on-Sea, Norfolk, England
- Burial place: St. Margaret's Church, Hopton-on-Sea, Norfolk
- Military career
- Allegiance: Great Britain; United Kingdom
- Branch: Royal Navy
- Service years: 1799–1854
- Rank: Admiral
- Commands: HMS Crocus; HMS Philomel; HMS Amphitrite; HMS Sappho; HMS Magicienne; HMS Cambrian; HMS Leopard
- Conflicts: French Revolutionary Wars; Egyptian Campaign; Napoleonic Wars; Battle of Trafalgar; Gunboat War; Mauritius campaign; Crimean War; Baltic Campaign of 1854 (Åland War)
- Awards: Knight Commander of the Order of the Bath

Admiral Sir James Hanway Plumridge KCB (13 March 1787 – 29 November 1863) was a British naval officer whose career extended from Trafalgar to the Crimean War, and a Liberal Party Member of Parliament (MP).

== Early life and education ==
There are contradictory accounts of Plumridge's origins. He was born at Hertford Street, Mayfair, either the illegitimate son of a man named Preston and a daughter of James Plumridge, or, the son of architect James Plumridge of Littleworth, Berkshire, and the daughter of a man called Hanway of Hertford Street. There is an entry in the baptismal register at St George's, Hanover Square on 1 April 1787 for a James Hanway Plumridge, son of James and Susanna Plumridge.

According to a biography of Jonas Hanway, James Hanway Plumridge was his great-great-nephew, and the son of his great-niece, who was the sister of a man called Hanway Hanway.

He was educated at the Naval Academy in Chelsea.

== Wars against France ==
He entered the Navy on 6 September 1799 as a first-class volunteer aboard the sloop Osprey, employed in home waters under Commander John Watts. From December 1800 he served in the Mediterranean, as midshipman, master's mate, and for a short time as acting-lieutenant; firstly aboard the frigate Leda, under Captains George Johnstone Hope and Robert Honyman, seeing action in the Egyptian campaign under the former. He then followed Captain Hope into the 74s Defence, taking part in the battle of Trafalgar on 21 October 1805, and Theseus. Finally, he served aboard Melpomene, under Captain Peter Parker, from where he was promoted to lieutenant on 20 August 1806.

For the next seven years Plumridge served as a lieutenant; aboard the Repulse under Captain the Honourable Arthur Kaye Legge, in Zealous under Captains John Giffard and William Pierrepont, and then Melpomene again, under Captain Peter Parker. There, on 1 May 1809, during the Gunboat War, he commanded the boats of Melpomene in an attack on a Danish cutter of 6 guns and several merchantmen, which were lying under the protection of gun batteries in the harbour of Huilbo, Jutland. The cutter was destroyed, but with the loss of Lieutenant George Rennie, and five men severely wounded. Soon after Melpomene fought off an attack by a flotilla of 20 gun-boats, suffering considerable damage, and losing 34 men killed and wounded. He then served aboard the frigate Tartar, Captain Joseph Baker, in the Baltic.

By December 1810 Plumridge was serving aboard the frigate Menelaus under Captain Peter Parker again, and taking part in the capture of Isle de France. He then served aboard the 80-gun ship Tonnant, Captain Sir John Gore; in Tremendous and Hibernia, the flag-ships of Sir William Sidney Smith in 1812; and the frigate Resistance, Captain Fleetwood Pellew. On 5 October 1813 he commanded the boats of Resistance at the destruction of batteries and the capture of a convoy in Porto d'Anzo. He then served aboard Royal Sovereign, Captain Thomas Gordon Caulfeild, and Caledonia, the flagship of Sir Edward Pellew. In April 1814 he served as Pellew's aide-de-camp during the capture of Genoa.

== Peacetime service ==
On 7 June 1814 Plumridge was promoted to commander in the sloop Crocus, but within a month was transferred to command of Philomel and ordered to the East Indies. There on 29 April 1816, he was appointed acting-captain of the Bombay-built frigate Amphitrite, in which he returned to England by February 1817.

He then commanded the 18-gun brig-sloop Sappho from February 1818 until March 1821, visiting Saint Helena, and in 1820, while on the Irish station, capturing three American smugglers; Clinton on 13 August, Liberty on 14 August, and Maria on 12 October. Plumridge was finally promoted to post-captain on 9 October 1822, but had to wait until July 1831 before being appointed to command of the frigate Magicienne, serving in the East Indies until early 1835. From April 1837 until 1841 he was the Superintendent of the Packet Service at Falmouth.

In the 1837 election he stood unsuccessfully for Parliament in Penryn and Falmouth, but won the seat in 1841. He did not seek re-election in 1847. In June 1842 he was appointed Storekeeper of the Ordnance, and on 29 June 1847 was awarded the Good Service Pension.

Plumridge returned to sea duty in August 1847, commanding the frigate Cambrian on the East Indies and China Station, and serving as second-in-command with the rank of commodore. Following the death of the Commander-in-Chief, Francis Augustus Collier, on 28 October 1849, Plumridge served as C-in-C pro tem until the arrival of Charles Austen in January 1850. He was raised to the rank of rear admiral on 8 October 1852.

== Crimean War ==
In 1854, during the Crimean War, he was assigned to the fleet headed by Vice-Admiral Sir Charles Napier for operations in the Baltic, commanding a detached "flying squadron" of steamships. Flying his flag in the frigate Leopard, Plumridge operated in the Gulf of Bothnia during the Åland War (part of the Crimean War) bombarding a number of Finnish settlements to destroy fortifications, telegraph apparatus, and capture enemy shipping. He was afterwards sharply criticized for firing on civilian settlements. Furthermore, the destroyed Finnish commodities were for the greater part actually bought by British customers and often paid in advance, Plumridge effectively pillaging on his own nations's goods. On 21 June his force bombarded the fortress of Bomarsund in Åland, expending most of their ammunition for little result. It was on this occasion that a midshipman of the gunboat HMS Hecla won the first-ever Victoria Cross. In common with the other commanders of the 1854 Baltic campaign Plumridge's command was not renewed in 1855, but he was made a Knight Commander of the Order of the Bath on 5 July 1855.

Plumridge was made a vice admiral on 28 November 1857 and admiral on 27 April 1863, but died in November of the same year at Hopton Hall. He is buried in the churchyard of old St Margaret's Church, Hopton-on-Sea, Norfolk.

== Personal life ==
Plumridge was married three times. He married first in 1821, to a daughter of a Rear-Admiral Hart. She died in 1827, and he married for a second time in 1835 to Harriet Agnes, daughter of the Rt Hon Hugh Elliot, by whom he had several children. He was again left a widower in 1845. He married for a third time to Georgina Skinner, the sister of Thomas Skinner, who was the daughter of Lt-Col William Thomas Skinner, RA. He and his third wife also had several children, including Mabel Ann (1861-1931) who married the art critic, novelist and illustrator Haldane MacFall.

His maternal niece Catherine German married Hermann Philipp Rée, and their great-great-great-grandson is the former Prime Minister Rt. Hon. David Cameron.

Parliament of the United Kingdom
Preceded by Edward John Hutchins; James William Freshfield	Member of Parliament for Penryn and Falmouth; 1841–1847; With: John Vivian	Succeeded by Howel Gwyn; Francis Mowatt
Military offices
Preceded by George Anson	Storekeeper of the Ordnance; 1841	Succeeded by Francis Robert Bonham
