= Penryn and Falmouth =

Parliamentary constituency in the United Kingdom, 1885–1950

- Former county constituency for the House of Commons
- County: Cornwall
- Major settlements: Penryn and Falmouth

1918–1950
- Seats: One
- Created from: Penryn and Falmouth, St Austell and Truro
- Replaced by: Truro and Falmouth & Camborne

1832–1918
- Seats: 1832–1885: Two; 1885–1918: One
- Type of constituency: Borough constituency
- Created from: Cornwall and Penryn
- Replaced by: Penryn and Falmouth

Penryn and Falmouth was the name of a constituency in Cornwall, England, UK, represented in the House of Commons of the Parliament of the United Kingdom from 1832 until 1950. From 1832 to 1918 it was a parliamentary borough, initially returning two Members of Parliament (MPs), elected by the bloc vote system.

Under the Redistribution of Seats Act 1885, its representation was reduced to one member, elected by the first past the post system. In 1918 the borough was abolished and the name was transferred to a county constituency electing one MP.

== Boundaries ==
1918–1950: The Municipal Boroughs of Falmouth, Penryn, and Truro, the Urban District of St Austell, the Rural District of St Austell except the civil parishes of St Sampson and Tywardreath, the Rural District of East Kerrier except the civil parishes of Constantine, Mabe, and Perranarworthal, and the Rural District of Truro except the civil parishes of Kea, Kenwyn Rural, Perranzabuloe, St Agnes, St Allen, and Tregavethan.

== History ==
The constituency was created by the Reform Act 1832 (the "Great Reform Act") as a replacement for the Penryn constituency, which had become a notoriously rotten borough. The new borough consisted of Penryn, Falmouth and parts of Budock and St Gluvias parishes, giving it a mostly urban population of nearly 12,000, of whom 875 were registered to vote at its first election in 1832.

Initially Penryn and Falmouth elected two MPs, but this was reduced to one in 1885. It was one of the smallest constituencies in England for the next thirty years. At this period its voters were politically unpredictable; though generally among the more Conservative Cornish constituencies, they were influenced by personal factors and often swung against the national tide of opinion. Falmouth, which had a stronger non-conformist presence, was the more Liberal part of the constituency in the late 19th century, but was thought to become more Conservative as it developed its economy as a destination seaside resort.

In 1918 the borough was abolished, but the Penryn and Falmouth name was applied to the county constituency in which the two towns were placed. This was a much more extensive constituency, covering the whole of south central Cornwall, including the towns of Truro and St Austell as well a long stretch of coastline. The constituency had a more industrial character (a sixth of the population were engaged in tin mining); the area suffered badly from unemployment in the 1930s, and in 1935 the Labour Party came within 3,031 votes of winning what would have been their first seat in Cornwall.

The constituency was abolished for the 1950 general election, most of its area being moved into the Truro constituency. Penryn and Falmouth were assigned to the new Falmouth and Camborne division.

== Members of Parliament ==
=== Penryn & Falmouth borough 1832–1885 ===
Election	1st Member	1st Party	2nd Member	2nd Party
1832	Sir Robert Rolfe	Whig	Lord Tullamore	Tory
1834	Sir Robert Rolfe	Whig	Lord Tullamore	Conservative
1835	Sir Robert Rolfe	Whig	James William Freshfield	Conservative
1840	Edward John Hutchins	Whig	James William Freshfield	Conservative
1841	John Vivian	Whig	James Hanway Plumridge	Whig
1847	Howel Gwyn	Conservative	Francis Mowatt	Radical
1852	Howel Gwyn	Conservative	James William Freshfield	Conservative
1857	Thomas Baring	Whig	Samuel Gurney	Ind. Whig
1859	Thomas Baring	Liberal	Samuel Gurney	Ind. Liberal
1866	Jervoise Smith	Liberal	Samuel Gurney	Ind. Liberal
1868	Robert Fowler	Conservative	Edward Eastwick	Conservative
1874	David James Jenkins	Liberal	Henry Thomas Cole	Liberal
1880	David James Jenkins	Liberal	Reginald Brett	Liberal
1885	Representation reduced to one member			

=== Penryn & Falmouth borough 1885–1918 ===
Election	Member	Party
1885	David James Jenkins	Liberal
1886	William George Cavendish-Bentinck	Conservative
1895	Frederick John Horniman	Liberal
1906	Sir John Barker	Liberal
1910	Charles Sydney Goldman	Unionist
1918	Borough abolished; name transferred to county division	

=== Penryn & Falmouth division of Cornwall 1918–1950 ===
Election	Member	Party
1918	Sir Edward Nicholl	Coalition Conservative
1922	Capt Denis Shipwright	Conservative
1923	Sir Courtenay Mansel	Liberal
1924	George Pilcher	Conservative
1929	Sir Tudor Walters	Liberal
1931	Maurice Petherick	Conservative
1945	Evelyn King	Labour
1950	constituency abolished	

== Elections ==
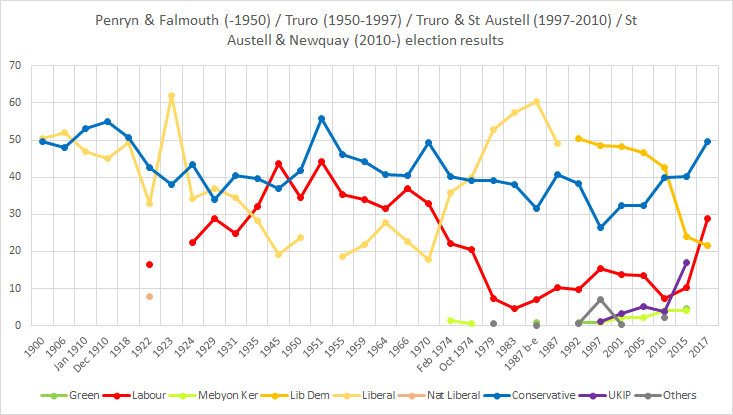
St Austell area election results

=== Elections in the 1830s ===
General election 1832: Penryn and Falmouth
Party	Candidate	Votes	%
Whig	✓ Robert Rolfe	490	36.6
Tory	✓ Charles Bury	428	32.0
Tory	James William Freshfield	338	25.2
Tory	Charles Stewart	83	6.2
Turnout		717	81.9
Registered electors		875	
Majority		62	4.6
Whig win (new seat)			
Majority		90	6.8
Tory win (new seat)			

General election 1835: Penryn and Falmouth
Party	Candidate	Votes	%	±%
Conservative	✓ James William Freshfield	464	36.1	+10.9
Whig	✓ Robert Rolfe	424	33.0	−3.6
Conservative	Charles Bury	397	30.9	−1.1
Turnout		736	90.8	+8.9
Registered electors		811		
Majority		40	3.1	−3.7
Conservative hold		Swing	+6.4	
Majority		27	2.1	−2.5
Whig hold		Swing	−4.3	

Rolfe was appointed Solicitor General for England and Wales, requiring a by-election.

By-election, 28 April 1835: Penryn and Falmouth
Party	Candidate	Votes	%	±%
Whig	✓ Robert Rolfe	348	51.6	+18.6
Conservative	Charles Bury	326	48.4	−18.6
Majority		22	3.2	+1.1
Turnout		674	83.1	−7.7
Registered electors		811		
Whig hold		Swing	+18.6	

General election 1837: Penryn and Falmouth
Party	Candidate	Votes	%	±%
Whig	✓ Robert Rolfe	523	39.6	+23.1
Conservative	✓ James William Freshfield	434	32.9	−34.1
Whig	James Hanway Plumridge	363	27.5	+11.0
Turnout		761	85.7	−5.1
Registered electors		888		
Majority		89	6.7	+4.6
Whig hold		Swing	+20.1	
Majority		71	5.4	+2.3
Conservative hold		Swing	−34.1	

=== Elections in the 1840s ===
Rolfe resigned after being appointed a Judge of the Court of the Exchequer, causing a by-election.

By-election, 23 January 1840: Penryn and Falmouth
Party	Candidate	Votes	%	±%
Whig	✓ Edward John Hutchins	462	66.0	−1.1
Conservative	William Carne	238	34.0	+1.1
Majority		224	32.0	+25.3
Turnout		700	79.1	−6.6
Registered electors		885		
Whig hold		Swing	−1.1	

General election 1841: Penryn and Falmouth
Party	Candidate	Votes	%	±%
Whig	✓ John Vivian	462	30.5	−9.1
Whig	✓ James Hanway Plumridge	432	28.5	+1.0
Conservative	Howel Gwyn	381	25.1	+8.7
Conservative	Edward John Sartoris	240	15.8	−0.7
Majority		51	3.4	−3.3
Turnout		768	86.9	+1.2
Registered electors		884		
Whig hold		Swing	−6.6	
Whig gain from Conservative		Swing	−1.5	

General election 1847: Penryn and Falmouth
Party	Candidate	Votes	%	±%
Conservative	✓ Howel Gwyn	548	54.2	+29.1
Radical	✓ Francis Mowatt	377	37.3	−21.7
Conservative	Peter Borthwick	87	8.6	−7.2
Turnout		506 (est)	58.6 (est)	−28.3
Registered electors		884		
Majority		171	16.9	N/A
Conservative gain from Whig		Swing	+20.0	
Majority		290	28.7	N/A
Radical gain from Whig		Swing	−21.8	

=== Elections in the 1850s ===
General election 1852: Penryn and Falmouth
Party	Candidate	Votes	%	±%
Conservative	✓ Howel Gwyn	464	37.5	−16.7
Conservative	✓ James William Freshfield	435	35.1	+26.5
Whig	Thomas Baring	339	27.4	−9.9
Majority		96	7.7	−9.2
Turnout		789 (est)	87.0 (est)	+28.4
Registered electors		906		
Conservative hold		Swing	−5.9	
Conservative gain from Radical		Swing	+15.7	

General election 1857: Penryn and Falmouth
Party	Candidate	Votes	%	±%
Whig	✓ Thomas Baring	Unopposed		
Independent Whig	✓ Samuel Gurney	Unopposed		
Registered electors		856		
Whig gain from Conservative				
Independent Whig gain from Conservative				

Baring was appointed a Civil Lord of the Admiralty, requiring a by-election.

By-election, 27 May 1857: Penryn and Falmouth
Party	Candidate	Votes	%	±%
Whig	✓ Thomas Baring	Unopposed		
Whig hold				

General election 1859: Penryn and Falmouth
Party	Candidate	Votes	%	±%
Liberal	✓ Thomas Baring	389	30.2	N/A
Independent Liberal	✓ Samuel Gurney	373	29.0	N/A
Conservative	Howel Gwyn	324	25.2	New
Conservative	John Fitzgerald Leslie Foster	200	15.6	New
Turnout		643 (est)	77.4 (est)	N/A
Registered electors		856		
Majority		16	1.2	N/A
Liberal hold		Swing	N/A	
Majority		49	3.8	N/A
Independent Liberal hold		Swing	N/A	

=== Elections in the 1860s ===
General election 1865: Penryn and Falmouth
Party	Candidate	Votes	%	±%
Liberal	✓ Thomas Baring	Unopposed		
Independent Liberal	✓ Samuel Gurney	Unopposed		
Registered electors		837		
Liberal hold				
Independent Liberal hold				

Baring succeeded to the peerage, becoming Lord Northbrook and causing a by-election.

By-election, 15 October 1866: Penryn and Falmouth
Party	Candidate	Votes	%	±%
Liberal	✓ Jervoise Smith	376	54.6	N/A
Conservative	Robert Fowler	313	45.4	New
Majority		63	9.2	N/A
Turnout		689	82.3	N/A
Registered electors		837		
Liberal hold		Swing	N/A	

General election 1868: Penryn and Falmouth (2 seats)
Party	Candidate	Votes	%	±%
Conservative	✓ Robert Fowler	732	27.9	N/A
Conservative	✓ Edward Eastwick	683	26.0	N/A
Liberal	Jervoise Smith	611	23.3	N/A
Liberal	Kirkman Hodgson	597	22.8	N/A
Majority		72	2.7	N/A
Turnout		1,312 (est)	72.5 (est)	N/A
Registered electors		1,808		
Conservative gain from Liberal		Swing	N/A	
Conservative gain from Independent Liberal		Swing	N/A	

=== Elections in the 1870s ===
General election 1874: Penryn and Falmouth (2 seats)
Party	Candidate	Votes	%	±%
Liberal	✓ David James Jenkins	851	28.1	+4.8
Liberal	✓ Henry Thomas Cole	784	25.9	+3.1
Conservative	Robert Fowler	743	24.6	−3.7
Conservative	Edward Eastwick	646	21.4	−4.6
Majority		41	1.3	N/A
Turnout		1,512	81.3	−8.8
Registered electors		1,860		
Liberal gain from Conservative		Swing		
Liberal gain from Conservative		Swing		

=== Elections in the 1880s ===
General election 1880: Penryn and Falmouth (2 seats)
Party	Candidate	Votes	%	±%
Liberal	✓ David James Jenkins	1,176	30.2	+2.1
Liberal	✓ Reginald Brett	1,071	27.5	+1.6
Conservative	Julius Vogel	882	22.7	−1.9
Conservative	John D. Mayne	765	19.6	−1.8
Majority		189	4.8	+3.5
Turnout		1,947 (est)	88.4 (est)	+7.1
Registered electors		2,202		
Liberal hold		Swing	+2.0	
Liberal hold		Swing	+1.7	

General election 1885: Penryn and Falmouth
Party	Candidate	Votes	%	±%
Liberal	David James Jenkins	1,170	52.3	−5.4
Conservative	William Cavendish-Bentinck	1,069	47.7	+5.4
Majority		101	4.6	−0.2
Turnout		2,239	87.4	−1.0 (est)
Registered electors		2,562		
Liberal hold		Swing	−5.4	

General election 1886: Penryn and Falmouth
Party	Candidate	Votes	%	±%
Conservative	William Cavendish-Bentinck	1,089	52.2	+4.5
Liberal	David James Jenkins	998	47.8	−4.5
Majority		91	4.4	N/A
Turnout		2,087	81.5	−5.9
Registered electors		2,562		
Conservative gain from Liberal		Swing	+4.5	

=== Elections in the 1890s ===
General election 1892: Penryn and Falmouth
Party	Candidate	Votes	%	±%
Conservative	William Cavendish-Bentinck	1,218	58.1	+5.9
Liberal	Arthur Serena	880	41.9	−5.9
Majority		338	16.2	+11.8
Turnout		2,098	81.3	−0.2
Registered electors		2,580		
Conservative hold		Swing	+5.9	

F.J.Horniman

General election 1895: Penryn and Falmouth
Party	Candidate	Votes	%	±%
Liberal	Frederick John Horniman	1,150	51.1	+9.2
Conservative	William Cavendish-Bentinck	1,101	48.9	−9.2
Majority		49	2.2	N/A
Turnout		2,251	86.0	+4.7
Registered electors		2,616		
Liberal gain from Conservative		Swing	+9.2	

=== Elections in the 1900s ===
General election 1900: Penryn and Falmouth
Party	Candidate	Votes	%	±%
Liberal	Frederick John Horniman	1,184	50.4	−0.7
Conservative	Nathaniel Louis Cohen	1,164	49.6	+0.7
Majority		20	0.8	−1.4
Turnout		2,348	85.2	−0.8
Registered electors		2,756		
Liberal hold		Swing	−0.7	

John Barker

General election 1906: Penryn and Falmouth
Party	Candidate	Votes	%	±%
Liberal	John Barker	1,345	51.9	+1.5
Conservative	D B Hall	1,248	48.1	−1.5
Majority		97	3.8	+3.0
Turnout		2,593	88.6	+3.4
Registered electors		2,926		
Liberal hold		Swing	+1.5	

=== Elections in the 1910s ===
General election January 1910: Penryn and Falmouth
Party	Candidate	Votes	%	±%
Conservative	Charles Sydney Goldman	1,593	53.0	+4.9
Liberal	John Barker	1,412	47.0	−4.9
Majority		181	6.0	N/A
Turnout		3,005	93.5	+4.9
Registered electors		3,215		
Conservative gain from Liberal		Swing	+4.9	

General election December 1910: Penryn and Falmouth
Party	Candidate	Votes	%	±%
Conservative	Charles Sydney Goldman	1,585	55.1	+2.1
Liberal	Walter Burt	1,291	44.9	−2.1
Majority		294	10.2	+4.2
Turnout		2,876	89.5	−4.0
Registered electors		3,215		
Conservative hold		Swing	+2.1	

General Election 1914–15: Another General Election was required to take place before the end of 1915. The political parties had been making preparations for an election to take place and by July 1914, the following candidates had been selected;

- Unionist: Charles Sydney Goldman
- Liberal:

General election 1918: Penryn and Falmouth,
Party		Candidate	Votes	%	±%
C	Unionist	Edward Nicholl	10,050	50.6	−4.5
	Liberal	Arthur Carkeek (businessman)	9,815	49.4	+4.5
Majority			235	1.2	−9.0
Turnout			19,865	56.6	−32.9
	Unionist hold		Swing	−4.5	
C indicates candidate endorsed by the coalition government.

=== Elections in the 1920s ===
General election 1922: Penryn and Falmouth
Party	Candidate	Votes	%	±%
Unionist	Denis Shipwright	11,566	42.7	−7.9
Liberal	Courtenay Mansel	8,879	32.8	−16.6
Labour	Joseph Harris	4,482	16.6	New
National Liberal	George Hay Morgan	2,129	7.9	New
Majority		2,687	9.9	+8.7
Turnout		27,056	72.5	+15.9
Unionist hold		Swing	+4.3	

General election 1923: Penryn and Falmouth
Party	Candidate	Votes	%	±%
Liberal	Courtenay Mansel	17,015	62.0	+23.2
Unionist	Denis Shipwright	10,429	38.0	−4.7
Majority		6,586	24.0	N/A
Turnout		27,444	73.0	+0.5
Liberal gain from Unionist		Swing	+17.0	

General election 1924: Penryn and Falmouth
Party	Candidate	Votes	%	±%
Unionist	George Pilcher	12,485	43.3	+5.3
Liberal	Courtenay Mansel	9,913	34.3	−27.7
Labour	Frederick Jesse Hopkins	6,462	22.4	New
Majority		2,572	9.0	N/A
Turnout		22,398	74.7	+1.7
Unionist gain from Liberal		Swing	+16.5	

General election 1929: Penryn and Falmouth
Party	Candidate	Votes	%	±%
Liberal	Tudor Walters	14,274	37.0	+2.7
Unionist	Maurice Petherick	13,136	34.1	−9.2
Labour	Frederick Jesse Hopkins	11,166	28.9	+6.5
Majority		1,138	2.9	N/A
Turnout		38,576	78.4	+3.7
Liberal gain from Unionist		Swing	+6.0	

=== Elections in the 1930s ===
General election 1931: Penryn and Falmouth
Party	Candidate	Votes	%	±%
Conservative	Maurice Petherick	16,388	40.5	+6.4
Liberal	Ernest Simon	14,006	34.6	−2.4
Labour	A.L. Rowse	10,098	24.9	−4.0
Majority		2,382	5.9	N/A
Turnout		40,492	79.8	+1.4
Conservative gain from Liberal		Swing	+4.4	

General election 1935: Penryn and Falmouth
Party	Candidate	Votes	%	±%
Conservative	Maurice Petherick	16,136	39.6	−0.9
Labour	A.L. Rowse	13,105	32.1	+7.2
Liberal	Ronald Wilberforce Allen	11,527	28.3	−6.3
Majority		3,031	7.5	+1.6
Turnout		40,778	77.6	−2.2
Conservative hold		Swing	-4.0	

A General election was due to take place before the end of 1940, but was postponed due to the Second World War. By 1939, the following candidates had been selected to contest this constituency;

- Conservative: Maurice Petherick
- Labour: A.L.Rowse

=== Elections in the 1940s ===
General election 1945: Penryn and Falmouth
Party	Candidate	Votes	%	±%
Labour	Evelyn King	17,962	43.8	+11.7
Conservative	Maurice Petherick	15,169	36.9	−2.7
Liberal	Percy Harris	7,917	19.3	−9.0
Majority		2,793	6.9	N/A
Turnout		41,048	73.0	−4.6
Labour gain from Conservative		Swing		

== Sources ==
- Michael Kinnear, The British Voter (London: BH Batsford, Ltd, 1968)
- Henry Pelling, Social Geography of British Elections 1885-1910 (London: Macmillan, 1967)
- J Holladay Philbin, Parliamentary Representation 1832 - England and Wales (New Haven: Yale University Press, 1965)
- Frederic A Youngs, jr, Guide to the Local Administrative Units of England, Vol I (London: Royal Historical Society, 1979)
- Leigh Rayment's Historical List of MPs – Constituencies beginning with "P" (part 1)
