= Maurice Petherick =

British politician (1894–1985)

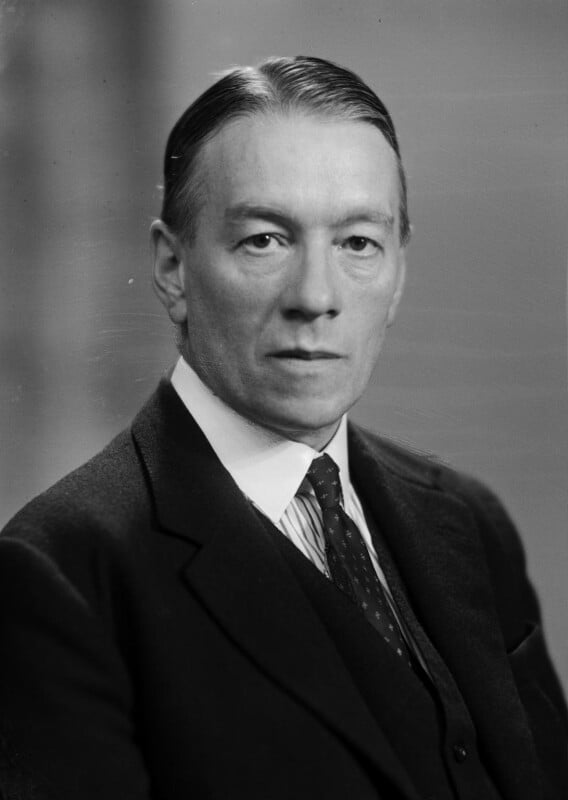
- Petherick in 1947

Member of Parliament for Penryn and Falmouth
- In office 27 October 1931 – 15 June 1945
- Preceded by: Tudor Walters
- Succeeded by: Evelyn King

Personal details
- Born: 5 October 1894
- Died: 4 August 1985 (aged 90)
- Party: Conservative

Maurice Petherick (5 October 1894 – 4 August 1985) was a British Conservative Party politician who served as the Member of Parliament (MP) for Penryn & Falmouth from 1931 to 1945, and as Financial Secretary to the War Office, briefly, in 1945.

== Early life ==
He was born on 5 October 1894, the son of George Tallack Petherick (b. 1860) and Edith Petherick, his wife. He was educated at Marlborough College and Trinity College, Cambridge.

== Military service ==
During the Great War, he was a Second Lieutenant in the Royal Devon Yeomanry 1914 but was invalided out in 1915. He served in Foreign Office, 1916–17; he was recommissioned Royal Scots Greys, 1917 and served in France, 1918. In October 1939, he was recommissioned to the General List Army, as a Captain and promoted to Temporary Major.

== Parliamentary service ==
Having contested the parliamentary seat of Penryn & Falmouth in 1929, as a Conservative, he was elected as MP in that division in the General Elections of 1931 and 1935

He was one of the MPs, who, in 1945, opposed the Yalta agreement, because of the treatment of Poland. He was Financial Secretary to the War Office from 26 May 1945 to 4 August 1945, in the "Caretaker Government".

In the 1945 General Election, he was defeated by the Labour candidate, Evelyn King.

== Other activities ==
Between 1953 and 1971, he was a Director of the Prudential Assurance Co. Ltd. He was High Sheriff of Cornwall in 1957. He wrote two novels and a collective biography of "rogues".

He died on 4 August 1985. At his death, his residence was Porthpean House, Lower Porthpean, St Austell, Cornwall. The garden that he developed there is still famous.

== Publications ==
- 1932: Captain Culverin. London: Ernest Benn (novel)
- 1943: Victoire: a novel. London: Macmillan
- 1951: Restoration Rogues; with plates, including portraits. London: Hollis & Carter (On Thomas Blood, William Bedloe, Ralph Montagu, Thomas Dangerfield, Edward Fitzharris and Barbara Villiers.)

Parliament of the United Kingdom
Preceded by Sir Tudor Walters	Member of Parliament for Penryn and Falmouth; 1931 – 1945	Succeeded by Evelyn King
