= Robert Rolfe, 1st Baron Cranworth =

British lawyer and Liberal politician

The Right Honourable The Lord Cranworth PC
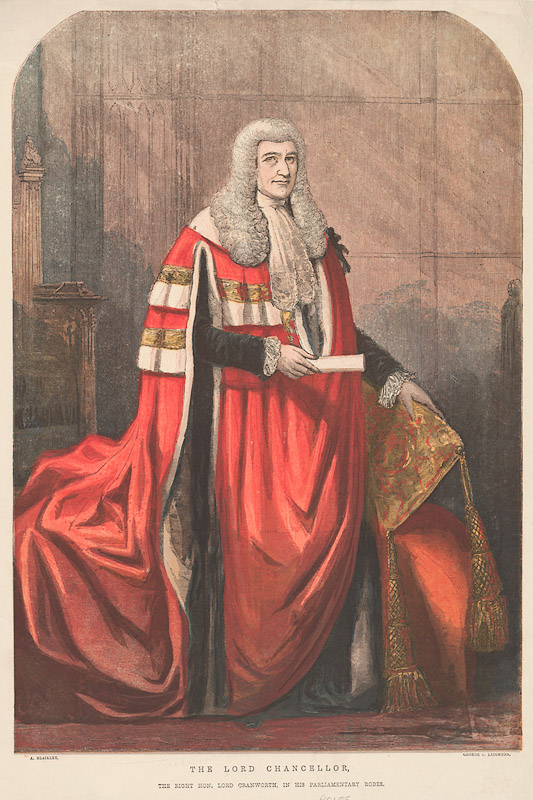
- Lord Cranworth wearing the parliamentary robes of a baron

Lord Chancellor
- In office 28 December 1852 – 21 February 1858
- Monarch: Victoria
- Prime Minister: The Earl of Aberdeen; The Viscount Palmerston
- Preceded by: The Lord St Leonards
- Succeeded by: The Lord Chelmsford
- In office 7 July 1865 – 26 June 1866
- Monarch: Victoria
- Prime Minister: The Viscount Palmerston; The Earl Russell
- Preceded by: The Lord Westbury
- Succeeded by: The Lord Chelmsford

Personal details
- Born: 18 December 1790 Cranworth, Norfolk
- Died: 26 July 1868 (aged 77) Holwood House; Keston, Kent; United Kingdom
- Party: Liberal
- Education: Trinity College, Cambridge

Robert Monsey Rolfe, 1st Baron Cranworth, PC (18 December 1790 – 26 July 1868) was a British lawyer and Liberal politician. He twice served as Lord High Chancellor of Great Britain.

== Background and education ==
Born at Cranworth, Norfolk, he was the elder son of the Reverend Edmund Rolfe and Jemima Alexander, James Alexander, 1st Earl of Caledon's niece and a granddaughter of physician Messenger Monsey. (Note: Monsey was chief medical adviser to the whigs and a friend of Daniel Dulany the Younger.) Rolfe, a relative of Admiral Lord Horatio Nelson, was educated at Bury St Edmunds, Winchester, Trinity College, Cambridge, Downing College, Cambridge (of which he was elected fellow) and was called to the bar, Lincoln's Inn, in 1816.

== Legal and political career ==
Cranworth represented Penryn and Falmouth in Parliament from 1832 until he was appointed a Baron of the Exchequer in 1839. In 1850 he was appointed a Vice-Chancellor and raised to the peerage as Baron Cranworth, of Cranworth in the County of Norfolk. In 1852 Lord Cranworth became Lord Chancellor in Lord Aberdeen's coalition ministry.

In 1854, Cranworth was appointed to the Royal Commission for Consolidating the Statute Law, a royal commission to consolidate existing statutes and enactments of English law.

Cranworth continued to hold the chancellorship also in the administration of Lord Palmerston until the latter's resignation in 1858. Cranworth was not reappointed when Palmerston returned to office in 1859, but on the retirement of Lord Westbury in 1865 he accepted the office for a second time, and held it till the fall of the Russell administration in 1866.

== Personal life ==
In 1845, Cranworth married Laura Carr (1807–1868), daughter of Thomas William Carr (born 1770). The couple had no children.

Lord Cranworth died at his seat, Holwood House, on 26 July 1868, aged 77, after a short illness related to the heat. He was childless and the title became extinct on his death.

== Cases ==
- Fouldes v. Willoughby (1841)
- Aberdeen Rly Co v Blaikie Bros (1854)
- Scott v Avery (1855)
- Jones v Lock (1865)
- Rylands v. Fletcher judgment given 9 days before his death.

== Arms ==
Coat of arms of Robert Rolfe, 1st Baron Cranworth
Crest A dove Argent in the beak a sprig of olive Proper ducally gorged Gules and resting the dexter foot upon three annulets interlaced Or. Escutcheon Gyronny of eight Argent and Gules an eagle displayed Sable charged on the breast with a sun in splendour Or. Supporters On either side a stag Or charged on the neck with four bandlets Sable upon the attires a ribbon Gules passing through an annulet Gold. Motto Post Nubila Phœbus

== Notes ==
Parliament of the United Kingdom
New constituency	Member of Parliament for Penryn and Falmouth; 1832–1840; With: Lord Tullamore 1832–1835; James William Freshfield 1835–1840	Succeeded by Edward John Hutchins; James William Freshfield
Legal offices
Preceded by Sir Charles Pepys	Solicitor General; 1834	Succeeded by Sir William Follett
Preceded by Sir William Follett	Solicitor General; 1835–1839	Succeeded by Sir Thomas Wilde
Preceded by James Wigram	Vice-Chancellor; 1850–1851	Succeeded by Sir George James Turner
Political offices
Preceded by The Lord St Leonards	Lord High Chancellor of Great Britain; 1852–1858	Succeeded by The Lord Chelmsford
Preceded by The Lord Westbury	Lord High Chancellor of Great Britain; 1865–1866	Succeeded by The Lord Chelmsford
Peerage of the United Kingdom
New creation	Baron Cranworth; 1850–1868	Extinct
