= Tudor Walters =

British politician (1868–1933)

The Right Honourable Sir Tudor Walters
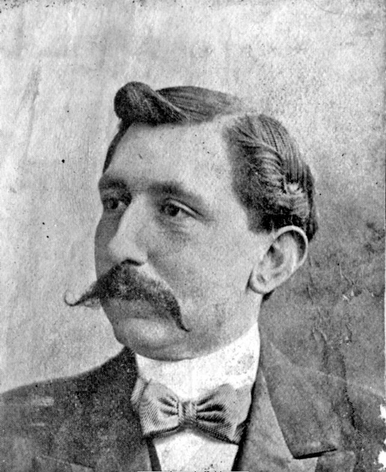

Paymaster General
- In office 26 October 1919 – 19 October 1922
- Monarch: George V
- Prime Minister: David Lloyd George
- Preceded by: Sir Joseph Compton-Rickett
- Succeeded by: Vacant
- In office 4 September 1931 – 5 November 1931
- Monarch: George V
- Prime Minister: Ramsay MacDonald
- Preceded by: Vacant
- Succeeded by: The Lord Rochester

Personal details
- Born: 25 February 1866 Pontypool, Monmouthshire
- Died: 16 July 1933 (aged 67) Middlesex, England
- Party: Liberal

Sir John Tudor Walters PC (25 February 1866 – 16 July 1933) was a Welsh architect, surveyor and Liberal Party politician. He served as Paymaster General under David Lloyd George from 1919 to 1922 and once again briefly in 1931 under Ramsay MacDonald.

== Political career ==
Walters was elected as the Member of Parliament (MP) for Sheffield Brightside at the 1906 general election and was knighted in 1912.

He served as Paymaster General in the Government of David Lloyd George from 1919 to 1922 and was sworn of the Privy Council in 1919. He lost his seat at Sheffield at the 1922 general election.

He tried unsuccessfully to get back into the House of Commons in 1923 at Pudsey and Otley in the West Riding of Yorkshire. He again stood for election to Parliament at the 1929 general election as Liberal candidate for the Cornish seat of Penryn and Falmouth. The seat was a marginal one which had been won by the Liberals in 1923, but was gained by the Conservatives in 1924, although the incumbent Conservative MP did not seek re-election. Ultimately Walters gained the seat from the Conservatives with a majority of 1,138 votes, with the Labour candidate finishing a relatively close third. He was once again briefly Paymaster-General from September to November 1931 under Ramsay MacDonald. He stood down from parliament at the 1931 general election.

== Housing policy ==
He is best known for the Tudor Walters Report that appeared just as the World War was ending in November 1918 and influenced British housing policy for a century. Walters was inspired by the garden city movement, calling for spacious low-density developments and semi-detached houses built to a high construction standard. Older women could now vote so local politicians started listening to them, and in response put more emphasis on such amenities as communal laundromats, extra bedrooms, indoor lavatories, running hot water, separate parlours to demonstrate respectability, and practical vegetable gardens rather than manicured yards.

Housewives had had their fill of chamber pots. His Report influenced the Housing, Town Planning, &c. Act 1919. With it Prime Minister David Lloyd George set up a system of government housing that followed his 1918 campaign promises of "homes fit for heroes". Known as the "Addison Act", it required local authorities to survey their housing needs, and start building houses to replace slums. The treasury subsidized the low rents. Slum clearance now moved from being a public health issue, to a matter of town planning.

Parliament of the United Kingdom
Preceded by James Hope	Member of Parliament for Sheffield Brightside; 1906–1922	Succeeded by Arthur Ponsonby
Preceded by George Pilcher	Member of Parliament for Penryn and Falmouth; 1929–1931	Succeeded by Maurice Petherick
Political offices
Preceded by Sir Joseph Compton-Rickett	Paymaster General; 1919–1922	Vacant Title next held by Neville Chamberlain
Vacant Title last held by The Lord Arnold	Paymaster General; 1931	Succeeded by The Lord Rochester
