= Samuel Gurney (MP) =

English banker and politician (1816–1882)

- Born: 1816
- Died: 1882 (aged 65–66)
- Occupation: Banker

Samuel Gurney (1816–1882) was a banker from the Gurney family. He served as independent Member of Parliament for Penryn & Falmouth from 1857 to 1868 but never spoke. He was also the first Chairman of the London and Provincial District Telegraph Co. Ltd. in 1859 (originally the London District Telegraph Co. Ltd.). He was president of the National Association for the relief of British Miners and, along with Edward Thomas Wakefield, founder and chairman of the Metropolitan Drinking Fountain and Cattle Trough Association

Gurney was the second son of Samuel Gurney (1786–1856), also a banker.
