= Great Cornish Families =

1995 book

Great Cornish Families: A History of the People and Their Houses
- First edition cover
- Author: Crispin Gill
- Language: English
- Subject: Cornish history
- Genre: Non-fiction
- Publication date: 1995
- Publication place: United Kingdom
- Media type: Print
- ISBN: 978-1-87106-025-6
- OCLC: 37989802

Great Cornish Families: A History of the People and Their Houses is a book by Crispin Gill, published in 1995. A second edition was published in 2011 (ISBN 978-0-85704-083-1). Crispin Gill, at the time of the book's publication, lived in Plymouth and was assistant editor of the Western Morning News. The book names many notable families that have featured prominently in Cornwall's history.

== Gill's great families ==
Gill chooses the following families:

- The Arundells of Lanherne, Arundells of Trerice
- Bassets of Tehidy
- Merchant princes, the Bolithos
- Boscawens, the Earls of Falmouth, Cornwall
- Carew Poles of Anthony
- Edgcumbes of Mount Edgcumbe House
- The Eliots, Earls of St Germans
- Godolphins of Godolphin
- The Grenvilles
- The Killigrews
- Molesworth St Aubyns of Pencarrow
- Prideauxs of Padstow
- Rashleighs of Menabilly, The Rashleigh baronets
- Agar-Robarteses of Lanhydrock
- St Aubyns of St Michael's Mount
- Treffrys of Fowey
- Trelawny of Pelynt
- Trevanions
- Vivians of Glynn
- Vyvyans of Trelowarren
- The Mining Williamses
- The Penroses of Killiow

== Additional families ==
=== Gill's list of important families not included above ===
In the introduction to Great families . . . , the following additional potentially great families are mentioned. They were not included in the list as they were deemed by him to have failed to "found a dynasty":

- Buller family of Morval, Cornwall, later of Downes in Devon.
- Carminow family
- Coryton family of Pentillie
- Fortescue family of Boconnoc
- Harvey family of Hayle
- Hawkins family of Trewithen
- Kendall of Pelyn
- Lemon family of Carclew
- Roscarrock family of St Endellion
- Smith-Dorrien-Smith family of Tresco
- Tangye family
- Tregoning family of Landue, Lezant
- Tremayne family of Heligan
- Trevelyan family

=== Other ===
- Trefusis of Trefusis Manor, Flushing, near Falmouth, see Baron Clinton

=== Deacon's list of important families ===
Bernard Deacon in his History of Cornwall (2007) suggests the following family names ("merchant bourgeois" who joined the "gentry" from the latter part of the 18th century): Williams, Bolitho, Fox, Davey of Redruth, Daniell of Truro, Harvey of Gwennap, Foster of Lostwithiel.

== Landowners ==
Table of Principal Cornish Landowners, mid-nineteenth century (ranked)

1. Lord Falmouth
2. Lord Robartes
3. G. M. Fortescue
4. G. L. Basset
5. Earl of Mount Edgcumbe
6. C. H. T. Hawkins
7. Sir R. R. Vyvyan
8. Col. A. Tremayne
9. Augustus Coryton
1. F. Rodd
2. J. M. Williams
3. J. J. Rogers
4. Earl of St Germans
5. Revd A. Molesworth-St Aubyn
6. Sir J. Trelawney
7. C. P. Brune
8. Edward Coode
9. Col. S. M. Grylls

Source: Returns of owners of land in England & Wales – House of Commons Sessional papers 1872-3: paper No. 1874 lixxii, quoted in Edwin Jaggard Cornwall politics in the age of reform 1790–1855, (1999).

Top landowners in Cornwall 1872*	Acres owned in Cornwall
Mr Jonathan Rashleigh of Menabilly, Par	30,156
Viscount Falmouth of Mereworth Castle, Maidstone, Kent	25,910
Lord Robartes MP of Lanhydrock, Bodmin	22,234
Mr Cyril Fortescue of Boconnoc, Lostwithiel	20,148
Mr Gustavus Basset of Tehidy Park, Redruth	16,969
Earl of Mount Edgcumbe MP of Mount Edgcumbe, Devonport	13,288
Mr Christopher Hawkins of Trewithen, Probus	12,119
Mr Francis Thynne of Haynes Park, Bedford	10,224
Rev Sir Vyell Vyvyan of Trelowarren, Helstone	9,738
Colonel Arthur Tremayne MP of Carclew, Perranarworthal	8,823

*(Source: Who owns Britain ? by Kevin Cahill) (Based on Return of Owners of Land, 1873)

== See also ==
- Lord Lieutenant of Cornwall
- High Sheriff of Cornwall
- Landed gentry
- Parliamentary representation from Cornwall
- Category:Cornish politicians
- Cornish heraldry
