= Cornish heraldry =

Aspect of the county in the United Kingdom

- Arms of the Duke of Cornwall: Sable, fifteen bezants. Bezants, adopted at an early period as a symbol of Cornwall, appear frequently in Cornish heraldry.
- Heraldic tradition: Gallo-British
- Governing body: College of Arms

Cornish heraldry is the form of coats of arms and other heraldic bearings and insignia used in Cornwall, United Kingdom. While similar to English, Scottish and Welsh heraldry, Cornish heraldry has its own distinctive features. Cornish heraldry typically makes use of the tinctures sable (black) and or (gold), and also uses certain creatures like Cornish choughs. It also uses the Cornish language extensively for mottoes and canting arms.

== Officials and law ==
=== Carminow v. Scrope ===
The arms blazoned Azure, a bend or, which were the subject of the cases

One of the earliest heraldic law cases brought in England was the 1389 case of Scrope v. Grosvenor. Scrope had found Grosvenor using the same arms as him, Azure a bend or, and set out to prove his sole right to use them. In heraldic law no two unrelated families in the same country are permitted to bear the same arms. Following a long court case it was decided that Scrope had the right to the arms and Grosvenor was forced to change his arms to Azure a garb or. It became known however that a Cornish knight by the name of Carminow was also using the disputed arms.

Carminow, seeing Scrope's use of his arms, challenged the right of Scrope to bear the arms. In this case, the constable of England declared that both claimants had established their right to the arms. Carminow had proven that his family had borne the arms "from the time of King Arthur", while the Scrope family had only used the arms "from the Norman Conquest of England". (Neither of these claims to such antiquity were in fact possible as the era of heraldry did not start until the late 12th century). The two families were, however, considered of different heraldic nations, Scrope of England, Carminow of Cornwall, and as such could both bear the same arms. As stated in the records of the case, Cornwall was in effect deemed a separate nation, "a large land formerly bearing the name of a kingdom."

John Vivian and Henry Drake, in their preface to the Visitation of the County of Cornwall, commented as follows: "Cornwall may be considered pre-eminent in the antiquity of its family heraldry, since it was admitted in court during the memorable Scrope and Grosvenor controversy that the same arms, Azure a bend or, had remained in the family of Carminow from King Arthur."

=== Officials ===
There are few recorded instances of heraldic officials in the Cornish tradition, however, heralds may commonly have been employed in Cornwall primarily as minstrels and story tellers. The harpist John Hilton was appointed by King Richard II as Cornwall Herald in 1398 at about the time of the Carminow case. A Cornwall Herald attended the coronation of Henry V in 1413 and there was a Cornwall Herald at the battle of Agincourt who, with the Duke of Norfolk, was too ill to take part. During the reigns of Edward IV and Henry VII the March herald was King of Arms of the west parts of England, Wales and Cornwall. Only one Cornish family is known to have had its own heraldic officer: Sir Richard Nanfan, Lord Deputy of Calais in 1503, retained a pursuivant or junior herald named Serreshal, but there may have been others.

=== Heraldic law ===
Cornish heraldry generally conformed with the rules and customs of English heraldry, and therefore with the Gallo-British tradition. However, the use of arms was far more widespread amongst the Cornish than the English and there was far less control over the use of heraldry. The antiquary Richard Carew wrote in the early 17th century, "The Cornish appear to change and diversify their arms at pleasure...The most Cornish gentlemen can better vaunt of their pedigree than their livelihood for that they derive from great antiquity, and I make question whether any shire in England of but equal quantitie can muster a like number of faire coate-armours". Jewers in his Heraldic church notes from Cornwall, c. 1860-80, mentions the large number of landowners using arms never registered with the College of Arms in London. Every large farm or barton in Cornwall housed its own "Gentleman of Coat Armour".

Historically primogeniture, the inheritance by the eldest son of the family estate, was not commonly practised in Cornwall. Amongst the Cornish, lands commonly were divided equally amongst all sons which resulted in smaller broken up estates, and if no sons existed lands were divided between daughters or closest relatives, male or female. This practice may have influenced the working and development of the Cornish tradition of heraldry. When primogeniture was practised, younger brothers were often married to an heiress. The heiress's arms were then adopted by the husband in place of his own family's.

== Duchy of Cornwall ==
Banner of the Duke of Cornwall

The Duchy of Cornwall was created in 1337 from the former earldom of Cornwall. The first Duke was Edward, the Black Prince (1330-1376) who first used the badge of Three ostrich feathers. Fox-Davies states that the badge associated with the Duchy is that of the Black Bull, often termed "of Clarence". Nevertheless, the Duchy is closely associated with the badge of the plume of feathers. The Black Prince erected a sculpted plume of feathers at the apex of the Duchy Palace roof at Lostwithiel when he paid his first visit there and to Restormel Castle in 1353.

The arms of the Duchy are blazoned sable, fifteen bezants. These arms were designed in the 15th century, based on the arms of Richard, Earl of Cornwall (1209-1272). A good explanation of the emblem of Cornwall is given by A. Fox-Davies in his “Book of Public Arms”: «In the days of the earlier Plantagenets, the pawnbrokers of Cornwall were the most enterprising and prosperous merchants in all England. When King John desired to hypothecate his crown jewels to raise money for a war in France, five of the principal "uncles" of Cornwall - Ben Levi of Truro, Ben Ezra of Penzance, Moses of Megavissey, (the other two names are illegible, see Manuscript CXLIX, British Museum) - formed an association, the Ancient and Honourable Association of Pawnbrokers, to take over his debts. The ‘trade-mark’ of the company was fifteen balls with the motto "One and All" to indicate that no business could be arranged without a quorum of all five members. When Edward I ascended the throne, this association was the most powerful in Cornwall. That Prince, following out his usual policy of exalting the merchant class, chose the trade-mark of the Ancient and Honourable Association of Pawnbrokers to be the coat-of-arms of the county of Cornwall.» Further information on the subject will be found in ‘An Ancyent and Ynterestyng Account of Ye Cornish Arms,’ of which there is a copy in the British Museum.

The arms are today used as a badge by Prince William, Duke of Cornwall and they appear below the shield in his coat of arms. The supporters used with the badge are two Cornish choughs, each holding an ostrich feather, and the motto is Houmout (meaning "high-spirited") the personal motto of the Black Prince.

=== Duke of Cornwall ===
For further reading; Coat of arms of the Prince of Wales

Title	Escutcheon	Greater Version	Blazon	Date of Creation
Duke of Cornwall			Sables, Fifteen bezants or, five, four, three, two, one	15th century (escutcheon); 1968 (greater version)
Duke of Cornwall (as the Prince of Wales)			Quarterly, 1st and 4th Gules three lions passant guardant in pale Or armed and langued Azure (for England), 2nd quarter Or a lion rampant within a double tressure flory-counter-flory Gules (for Scotland), 3rd quarter Azure a harp Or stringed Argent (for Ireland), with over all a label of three points Argent, and on an inescutcheon ensigned by the coronet of the heir-apparent, quarterly, Or and Gules four lions passant guardant counterchanged (for the Principality of Wales)	1911
Shield of Peace			Sables, three feathers argent, slipped through scrolls inscribed 'Ich Dien'	14th century

== Cornish Symbolism ==
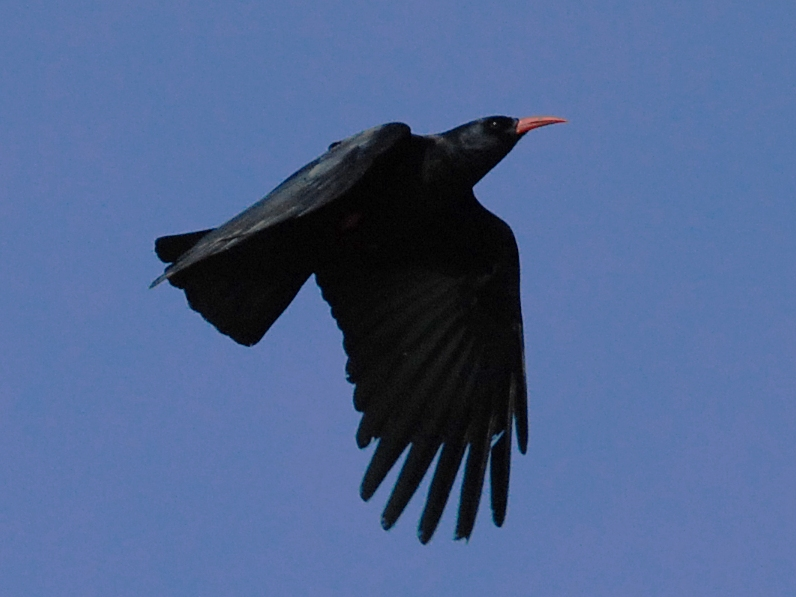
A Cornish chough flying in Penwith

There are several charges and tinctures (colourings) used frequently in Cornish heraldry. These are derived mainly from Cornish royal and national symbolism.

=== Common charges ===
- Chough: the Cornish Chough, Cornwall's national bird, is very widely used in Cornish heraldry.

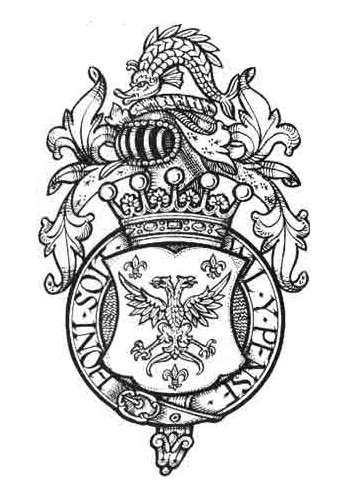
Arms of the Godolphin family of Godolphin, featuring a double-headed eagle

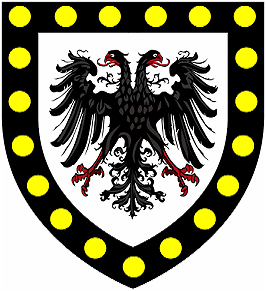
Arms of the Killigrew family, featuring both bezants and a double-headed eagle

- Double-headed eagle: eagles with two heads occur prominently in several Cornish arms, in contrast to the rest of Britain where they are rare. The popularity of this form of eagle is probably due to Richard, Earl of Cornwall, who bore such an eagle in his role as King of the Romans.
- Bezants: Lower describes how Cornish families took the bezant from the arms of the ancient earls of Cornwall, "this coat is pretended to from Cadock or Cradock earl of Cornwall in the fifth century". The bezant in fact derives from the arms of Richard, Earl of Cornwall.
- Rose: the rose is an extremely common charge in Cornish heraldry, thought by Lower to originate in the Wars of the Roses. William Smith Ellis thought it might have been derived from an unknown Anglo-Norman family in Cornwall using it as an emblem and passing it on to their supporters. It is more likely, however, to derive from the Cornish placename element ros meaning a promontory or heathland, or res, a ford, Cornish gentry often using the name of their major estate as a surname. It is used by the family of Boscawen originally from Boscawen Rose.

== Mottoes ==
Many Cornish families from ancient times bore mottoes in the Cornish language, many of which were recorded in the 17th century. The practice of using Cornish language mottoes continues to this day. Examples include:

=== Familial examples ===
- Michell - Deo Favente (Favoring God)
- Vaughan - Asgre lan dyogel ey pherchen (A good conscience is the best shield)
- Carminow - Cala rag whethlow (A straw for the talebearer)
- Glynn - Dre weres agan Dew ny (By the help of our God)
- Truscott and Gay - Gwir yn erbyn y byd (the truth against the world)
- Polwhele - Karenza wheelas Karenza (Love seeks out love)
- Tonkin - Kensol tra Tonkyn, ouna Dew mathern yn (Before all things Tonkin, fear God in the King)
- Williams - Meor vas tha dew (Gracious is thy God)
- Polkinghorne - Rag Matern a pow (For King and Country)
- Bolitho - Re deu (By God)
- Ruddle - Ruthek ha yagh (Ruddy and hearty)
- Tremenheere - Thrugscryssough ne Deu a nef (Do not disbelieve in God of Heaven)
- Tonkin - Yn ton kyn nyjyaf (In a wave I swim)
- Godolphin - Frank ha leal ettoga (Free and Loyal Forever) and Franc ha leal atho ve (Free and Loyal Am I)
- Boscawen -Bosco, Pasco, Karenza Venza (canting arms of unknown meaning, however Karensa a vynsa, covaytys ny vynsa (Love would, greed wouldn't) is a Cornish saying)
- Harris of Keneggy - Car Deu reyz pub tra (Love God above all)
- Noye of St Buryan - Teg yw hedhwch (Fair is peace)
- Gwavas - En Hav perkou Gwav (In summer remember winter)
- Sloggett of Tresloggett - Bethoh Dur (Be Bold)
- Harvey - Arva hep arveth (To arm without aggression)
- Tangye - Tangy an dorgallow
- Southcott - Nerth Dre Lelder (Strength Through Loyalty)
- Trenear-Harvey - "Harth mes Len" (Boldly but sincerely)
- Treen - A-barth an myghtern (For the King)

=== Corporate examples ===
The coat of arms of Cornwall Council

- Cornish Guild of Heralds - Tyr ha Tylu (Land and Family)
- Cornwall Council - Onen hag Oll (One and All)
- Old Cornwall societies - Myghtern Arthur nyns yu marrow (King Arthur is not dead)
- Federation of Old Cornwall Societies - Kyntelleugh an brewyon es gesys na vo kellys travyth (Gather ye the fragments that are left, that nothing be lost)
- Gorseth Kernow - An gwyr erbyn an bys (The truth against the world)

== List of Cornish Arms ==
=== A ===
Name	Escutcheon	Blazon	Seat or Residence
Arundell		Sable, six martlets argent	• Trerice

=== B ===
Name	Escutcheon	Blazon	Seat or Residence
Basset		Barry wavy of six or and gules	• Tehidy
Bond		Argent, a chevron sables with three bezants or	• Saltash
Bodrugan		Argent, three bendlets gules a bordure engrailed sable	
Boscawen		Ermine, a rose gules barbed and seeded proper	• Falmouth
Buller		Sable, on a cross argent quarter pierced of the field four eagles displayed of the first	• Trenant Park

=== C ===
Name	Escutcheon	Blazon	Seat or Residence
Calmady		Azure, a chevron between three pears or	• Stoke Climsland
Carew		Or, three lions passant in pale sable	• Torpoint
Carwythan		Argent, a fleur-de-lys gules a bordure engrailed	
Coryton		Argent, a saltire sable	• Pentillie • Newton Ferrers House
Curnow		Argent, lion rampant gules with a ducal crown or	
Cutts		Argent, a bend engrailed sables, three roundels argent.	• Calstock

=== E ===
Name	Escutcheon	Blazon	Seat or Residence
Edgcumbe		Gules, bend ermines cotised or three boar's heads couped argent	• Cotehele • Mount Edgcumbe, Maker
Elliot		Argent, a Fess Gules, between double-cotises wavy Azure	• Port Eliot

=== F ===
Name	Escutcheon	Blazon	Seat or Residence
Fortescue		Azure, a bend engrailed argent plain cotised or	• Boconnoc
Flamank		Argent, a cross between four mullets pierced gules	• Nanstallon • Bodmin
Fox		Ermine, on a chevron azure three fox's heads or, and on a canton azure a fleur-de-lis or	• Falmouth
Friend		Gules, chevron ermine, three deer argent	• Calstock

=== G ===
Name	Escutcheon	Blazon	Seat or Residence
Gifford		Azure, three fleurs-de-lis, two and one with a pellet on each fleur-de-lis.	
Gilbert		Argent, a chevron gules with three roses argent.	
Godolphin		Gules, an eagle with two heads, displayed between three fleurs-de-lys, two and one, argent	• Godolphin House
Goss		Argent, mullet gules, two, two, one, two, two	• Goss's boatyard, Calstock
Gough		Sable, a chevron between three mermaids argent hair glass case and comb or	• Aldercombe • Kilkhampton
Glencross	Size	Per saltire ermine and azure, a lion rampant or, holding in the dexter forepaw a cross patonce of the last, in chief three chaplets of oak proper, fructed gold.	Luxstowe House
Grenville		Gules, three clarions or	
Gross/Grosse		Quarterly argent and azure, on a bend sable three martlets or	

=== H ===
Name	Escutcheon	Blazon	Seat or Residence
Hender		Azure semée of escallops or, a lion rampant	
Hunkin		Argent, a mascle sable over all a fess	

=== K ===
Name	Escutcheon	Blazon	Seat or Residence
Killigrew		Argent, bordure sables, 15 bezants or, eagle sables	

=== M ===
Name	Escutcheon	Blazon	Seat or Residence
Michell		Sable, an escallop, between three falcons heads erased or	Truro
Molesworth-St Aubyn		Ermine, on a cross sable five bezants	• Pencarrow

=== P ===
Name	Escutcheon	Blazon	Seat or Residence
Pascoe		Argent, lion rampant sable	
Pawley		Argent, a lion rampant sable, on a chief dancetty of the second three mullets	
Pengelly			
Pennarth		Argent, a chevron between three bears' heads erased sables muzzled or	
Prideaux		Argent, a chevron sable in chief a label of three points gules	• Prideaux Place

=== R ===
Name	Escutcheon	Blazon	Seat or Residence
Rashleigh		Sable a cross Or between in the first quarter a argent beaked and legged gules, in the second quarter a text "T", in the third and fourth quarters a crescent, all argent	• Menabilly • Fowey
Robartes		Azure, three estoiles and a chief wavy or	• Lanhydrock

=== S ===
Name	Escutcheon	Blazon	Seat or Residence
Scoble		Argent, lapel azure and three Fleur-de-lis gules	• Calstock
Southcott		Argent, a chevron engrailed gules between three coots sable	• Calstock • Callington
Speccot		Or, on a bend gules three millrinds argent	• Penheale
St Aubyns		Ermine on a Cross Gules five Bezants all within a Bordure wavy of the second	• St Michael's Mount

=== T ===
Name	Escutcheon	Blazon	Seat or Residence
Thomas		Per pale nebuly argent and azure	• St Just in Penwith
Treen		Per chevron embattled Or and Vert, in chief two oak trees and in base a garb counterchanged.	Penwith
Treffry	Arms of Treffry	Sable, a Chevron between three Trees Argent	• Place, Fowey
Trefusis		Argent, a chevron between three spindles sable	
Trelawny		Argent, chevron sable	• Harewood House, Calstock • Trelawny, Pelynt
Tremayne		Gules, three dexter arms conjoined at the shoulders and flexed in triangle or the fists clenched argent	
Trethurffe		Azure, a buck's head cabossed argent attired or	• Ladock
Trevelyan		Gules, a demi-horse argent hoofed and maned or issuing out of water in base proper	• St Veep
Trewern	Trewern Family Shield - Azure field with OR chevron and fifteen Or bezant beneath it	Azure, a chevron Or, in base fifteen bezants 5,4,3,2,1.	Madron

=== V ===
Name	Escutcheon	Blazon	Seat or Residence
Vautort		Argent, three bends gules a bordure sable bezantee	• Trematon

=== W ===
Name	Escutcheon	Blazon	Seat or Residence
Westlake		Azure, three bars wavy argent	• Calstock • Gunnislake • Tavistock
Wilcox		Ermine, chief chequy or and sable	• Kelly House, Calstock
Williams		Vair, three crescents or	• Harewood House, Calstock • St Michael Caerhays • Scorrier House; Burncoose
Worth		Argent, eagle sable	• Calstock

== Canting arms ==
As in other heraldic traditions, canting, punning on the surname, is frequently used in Cornish heraldry. Often this uses the Cornish language, suggesting it was considered a high status language. These may not reflect the true origin of the name. Examples include:

- Rose. Use is made of the rose as a charge for surnames containing ros and in mottoes can be a cant in English (rose) or Cornish (rosen, Cornish for rose).
- Cleather (Cornish - kledha, a sword) - Vert, a chevron between three swords pointed downwards Or.
- Keigwyn (Cornish - ki gwynn, a white dog) - Vert, a chevron between three greyhounds courant Argent
- Trembleth (Cornish - blyth, a wolf) - Sable, a wolf passant Argent
- Gregor (Cornish - gruk yar, partridge, lit. heather-hen) - Argent, a chevron Gules between three partridges proper.
- Molenick (Cornish - melynek, a goldfinch or greenfinch) - Argent, a chevron Sable between three goldfinches proper.
- Treen - Per chevron embattled Or and Vert, in chief two oak trees and in base a garb counterchanged: the trees make an English pun on the name.
- Trenethyn (Cornish - edhen, a bird) - Argent, a Cornish Chough Sable
- Treweek (Cornish - whek, sweet) - Argent, a beehive surrounded with bees volant proper.
- Trevisa (Cornish - ys, corn) - Gules, a garb Or.
- Harvey (Cornish - havrek, arable land, harve, to harrow) - Argent, a chevron between three harrows Sable
- Whetter (Cornish - whether, blower) - Argent, a bellows between two garbs proper.
- Andean/Endean (Cornish - an den, the man) - Gules, a man statant naked proper holding in the dexter hand a cross fitchee Or, and in the sinister hand a sword Argent
- Penderill (Cornish - derow, oak trees) - Argent, on a mount an oak tree Vert, over all a fesse Purpure charged with three royal crowns Argent
- Penarth (Cornish - penn ors, bear head) - Argent, a chevron between three bears' heads erased Sable muzzled Or.
- Penwyn (Cornish - penn gwynn, white head) - Gules, three boars' heads erased in pale Argent
- Penberthy (Cornish - penn perthy, head bushes) - Argent, two choughs heads above a gorse bush proper.
- Gwyn (Cornish - gwynn, white) - Per pale Azure and Gules, three lions rampant Argent
- Pellavere/Pellover/Pellower/Pellor/Pellow (Cornish - pell owr, gold ball) - Sable, a chevron Or between three bezants.
- Trenear - Three Cornish Choughs near to each other: 'Three Near'

== Supporters and crests ==
Supporters are figures usually placed on either side of the escutcheon which hold it up-right. In British heraldry, the use of supporters is restricted to peers, royalty, Scottish barons and chiefs of clans. However a number of Cornish families, such as the Carminows and the Trevanions, do possess supporters, despite not being of noble rank as required in Scottish or English heraldry. The Carminows use: dexter, A pelican and sinister, A Cornish chough. The Trevanions: dexter, A stag, sinister A lion. The Trevelyan family had Two dolphins proper as their supporters. Treffry had A man and a woman as supporters The St Legers of Cornwall used A wingless griffin. The office of Lord Warden of the Stannaries gave entitlement to the use of supporters. Sir Walter Raleigh, Lord Warden of the Stannaries 1584-1603, used Two wolves as his supporters from 1584 onwards.

== Mythology ==
=== Attributed arms ===
Attributed arms of the Saint Piran family

- The heraldic achievements of the Vyvyan and Trevelyan families both reflect claims that they were descended from the only survivor of the destruction of Lyonesse who escaped on the back of a white horse. The Vyvyans having a horse for their crest and on their arms a lion rising out of the waves, whilst the Trevelyan's have a white horse rising out of the waves for their arms.
- Saint Piran, a 6th-century abbot who later became Cornwall's patron saint, is said to have borne sable, a cross argent. This design is very popular today as a symbol of Cornwall, and it is used as the Cornish flag.

== See also ==
There is another list of armorial blazons "from Late 16th/Early 17th C Cornwall" here

There is a compendium of West Country arms, including many Cornish arms, collated from numerous primary and secondary sources, here

- Cornish symbols
- Devon heraldry
- Dorset heraldry
- Great Cornish Families
- Cornish corporate heraldry
