= Sir John Molesworth, 2nd Baronet =

English Tory politician (1635–1716)

Sir John Molesworth, 2nd Baronet (May 1635 – October 1716) was an English Tory politician.

== Biography ==
Molesworth was the eldest son of Hender Molesworth of Pencarrow and Mary, née Sparke. He was educated at Balliol College, Oxford and the Inner Temple. He succeeded to his father's estate in 1647, while still a minor.

He was knighted on 18 June 1675 and by 1685 he had been appointed Vice-Admiral of North Cornwall. He balanced his loyalty to the Church of England and loyalty to the Crown in the years prior to the Glorious Revolution, but in 1688–9 he was quick to voice public support for the new Williamite regime. He was, nonetheless, included on a list of suspected Jacobites found by agents in 1694. Molesworth's younger brother, Hender Molesworth, was created a baronet on 19 July 1689; a week later, Molesworth succeeded to his brother's title by special remainder following his premature death. In 1690–1 he served a term as High Sheriff of Cornwall.

At the 1695 English general election, Molesworth was influential in the election of his distant cousin, Robert Molesworth, in the Cornish borough of Camelford. In the January 1701 English general election, Molesworth was himself elected as a member of parliament for Lostwithiel. In an analysis of the Commons conducted in 1701, he was listed as a supporter of Robert Harley's Tories. He was re-elected in Lostwithiel in the November 1701 and the 1702 general elections. He generally kept to the Tory line and was expected to vote in favour of the Tack, but abstained in the 28 November 1704 vote having been lobbied by Hugh Boscawen. He stood down at the 1705 English general election.

Parliament of England
Preceded by George Booth; Samuel Travers	Member of Parliament for Lostwithiel with John Buller (1701); George Booth (1701–1702); Russell Robartes (1702–1705); 1701–1705	Succeeded by Robert Molesworth; Russell Robartes
Honorary titles
Preceded by Sir Joseph Tredenham	Vice-Admiral of North Cornwall; 1686–1715	Succeeded by Sir John Trelawny
Preceded by John Morth	High Sheriff of Cornwall; 1690–1691	Succeeded by John Buller
Baronetage of England
Preceded by Hender Molesworth	Baronet (of Pencarrow); 1689–1716	Succeeded by John Molesworth
