= Lemon baronets =

Escutcheon of the Lemon baronets of Carclew

Carclew House, the seat of the Lemon family

The Lemon Baronetcy, of Carclew in the County of Cornwall, was a title in the Baronetage of Great Britain. It was created on 24 May 1774 for William Lemon, Member of Parliament for Penrhyn and Cornwall.

The 2nd Baronet also represented these constituencies as well as Cornwall West in the House of Commons. The title became extinct on his death in 1868.

The family seat was Carclew House, near Mylor, Cornwall.

== Lemon baronets, of Carclew (1774) ==
- Sir William Lemon, 1st Baronet (1748–1824)
- Sir Charles Lemon, 2nd Baronet (1784–1868)

Baronetage of Great Britain
Preceded by Symons baronets	Lemon baronets of Carclew; 24 May 1774	Succeeded by Blake baronets
