= Sir William Molesworth, 6th Baronet =

British aristocrat and MP for Cornwall 1784 - 1790

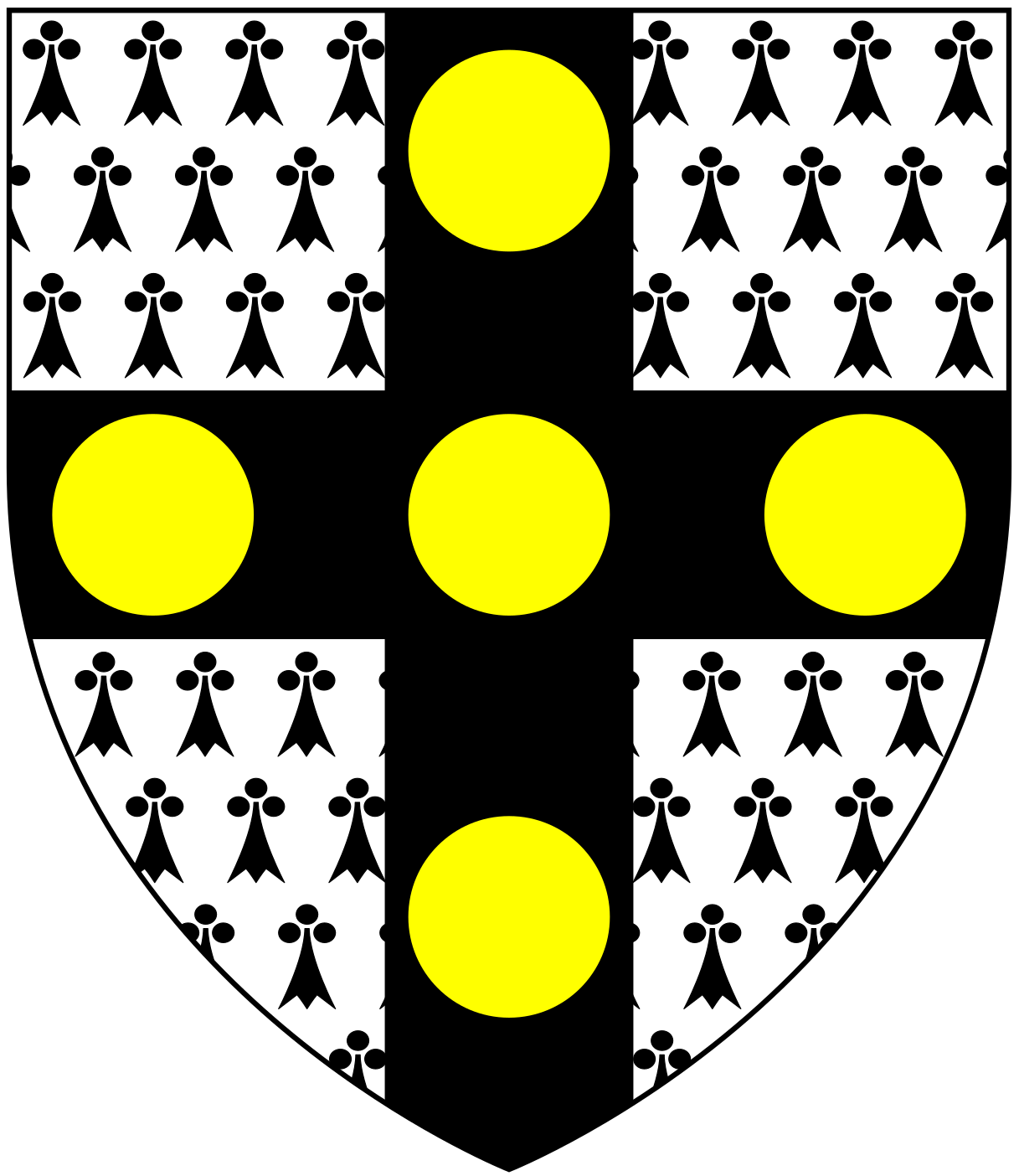
Arms of St Aubyn, as quartered by the Molesworth-St Aubyn Baronets of Pencarrow: Ermine, on a cross sable five bezants

Sir William Molesworth, 6th Baronet (30 June 1758 – 22 February 1798) was one of the Molesworth baronets of Pencarrow, Cornwall and a British politician who sat in the House of Commons from 1784 and 1790.

== Early life ==
Molesworth was the son of Sir John Molesworth, 5th Baronet who was previously MP for Cornwall. He was educated at Eton College from 1769 to 1774 and matriculated at St John's College, Cambridge in 1776. He succeeded his father in the Baronetcy as 6th Baronet on 20 October 1775. He married Caroline Treby, daughter of Paul Henry Ourry on 27 May 1786.

== Political career ==
Molesworth was returned unopposed as Member of Parliament for Cornwall in a by-election on 25 February 1784. He was returned again unopposed at the 1784 general election. He spoke progressively more frequently and pursued an independent line. In September 1789, Molesworth saw he would be opposed at the 1790 general election and decided not to stand. He said: "You called me unsolicited on my part to be your representative, and if you no longer wish for my services I am ready to return to the private situation from whence you took me."

== Later life ==
Molesworth died on 22 February 1798 and his son Arscott Ourry Molesworth (1789 – 26 December 1823) succeeded to the baronetcy. His youngest daughter Caroline Molesworth (1794–1872) was a botanist whose observations were published in 1880 as The Cobham Journals: abstracts and summaries of meteorological and phenological observations made by Miss Caroline Molesworth, at Cobham, Surrey, in the years 1825-1850.

Parliament of Great Britain
Preceded by Edward Eliot; Sir William Lemon, Bt	Member of Parliament for Cornwall; 1784–1790; With: Sir William Lemon, Bt	Succeeded by Francis Gregor; Sir William Lemon, Bt
Baronetage of England
Preceded by John Molesworth	Baronet of Pencarrow; 1775–1798	Succeeded by Arscott Molesworth
