= Allanson =

Allanson is a surname. Notable people with the surname include:

- Andy Allanson (born 1961), American baseball player
- Ashley Allanson (born 1986), English professional footballer
- Noel Allanson (1925–2022), Australian rules footballer
- Robert Allanson (1735–1846), British architect
- Rowland Allanson-Winn, 5th Baron Headley (1855–1935), Irish peer
- Susie Allanson (born 1952), American country music singer and actress

== See also ==
- Allanson, Western Australia
