= David Treffry =

British colonial servant and international financier

David Treffry, OBE, (7 October 1926 – 3 April 2000) was a British colonial servant, international financier and High Sheriff of Cornwall.

== Early life ==
David Treffry, a member of the old Cornish family of Treffry, was born at Porthpean in 1926. He was educated in Cornwall and at Marlborough College, and then served in the Duke of Cornwall's Light Infantry, transferring to the Indian Army, where he was a captain in the Frontier Force Regiment. In 1947 he returned to Britain and read history at Magdalen College, Oxford.

== Colonial servant ==
Treffry joined the Colonial Service in 1953, and served in Aden until independence in 1967. He achieved senior posts, and as Cabinet Secretary to the South Arabian Federation was involved in the independence negotiations.

While in Aden, Treffry supported the work of the Reilly Centre for the Blind, and for this work was appointed OBE in 1966.

== International financier ==
David Treffry moved to Washington D. C. in 1968 to work for the International Monetary Fund, remaining there for 21 years.

== Public servant and High Sheriff ==
Treffry retired to his ancestral home of Place in Fowey in 1987, where he played a conspicuous part in Cornish public life, becoming High Sheriff in 1991, president of the Royal Institution of Cornwall in 1993, and oversaw the inauguration in 1994 by the Queen and the Duke of Edinburgh of the Royal Cornwall Museum. He also worked for the Cornwall region of the National Trust, and other local organizations.

He was a friend of the Cornish historian and poet A. L. Rowse, and, on Rowse's death, became the legatee of a substantial sum – which he made over to the Royal Institution of Cornwall, the National Trust, and the Cornwall Heritage Trust.

In 1997 he was diagnosed with a terminal illness, but continued to play an active rôle in Cornish public and social life until his death at Truro in 2000.
