= Caroline Molesworth =

British botanist and meteorologist (1794–1872)

Caroline Molesworth (4 November 1794 - 29 December 1872) was a British botanist and meteorologist.

== Family ==
Caroline Molesworth was born in 1794. She was the daughter of Sir William Molesworth, 6th Baronet, of Pencarrow, Cornwall, and Caroline Treby Molesworth née Ourry. After her fathers death, the Baronetcy went to her brother Arscott Ourry Molesworth, then Caroline's nephew Hugh Molesworth inherited the title as 9th Baronet, and remained in Cornwall as a country parson. She sent him many gifts of flower and vegetable seed for the garden he planted at the Parsonage House, Little Petherick in 1857.

== Career ==
Molesworth moved from London to Cobham Lodge, Surrey, in 1823 after her widowed mother inherited the estate from General Felix Buckley. She immediately began a series of daily observations which continued until 1858 and in part until 1867. Each day she recorded data in 19 columns, including the date, hours of sunset and sunrise, several temperature readings, barometer pressure, observations on animals and on plants, and Tagliabue's storm glass reading. This storm glass has been described by Anderson as "a mixture of camphor, potassium nitrate and ammonium chloride in alcohol and water, in which particles apparently crystallized more or less strongly under different weather conditions". She also notes that "it was described by her biographer dismissively as 'scarcely more than a scientific toy'".

Molesworth's records covering 1825-1850 were published in 1880 as The Cobham Journals: abstracts and summaries of meteorological and phenological observations made by Miss Caroline Molesworth, at Cobham, Surrey, in the years 1825-1850, edited by Eleanor A. Ormerod (the first female fellow of the Meteorological Society), which was reviewed in The Spectator. This was republished in 2015 by Cambridge University Press.

Molesworth's letters and her herbarium are held at Kew Gardens, London. Her diaries of observations are held by the Met Office and are accessible online as .pdf files.
