= Civic heraldry =

Type of heraldry

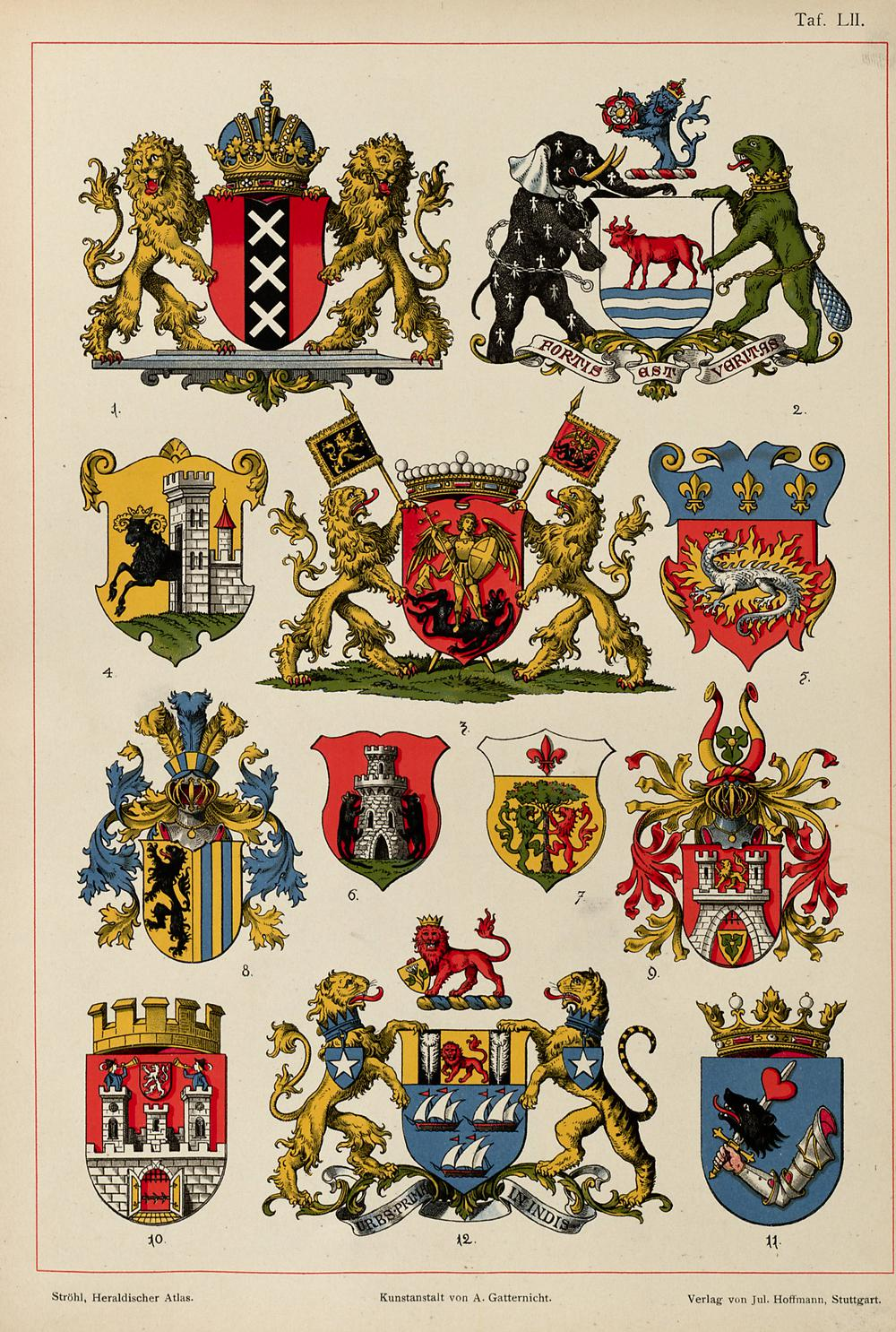
Examples of city arms in Heraldischer Atlas (1899) by Austrian heraldic artist Hugo Gerard Ströhl (note that some of these arms have been altered since): 1. Amsterdam, the Netherlands, 2. Oxford, England; 3. Brussels, Belgium, 4. Schaffhausen, Switzerland, 5. Le Havre, France; 6. Murlo, Italy, 7. Sorbano, Italy, 8. Leipzig, Germany, 9. Hannover, Germany; 10. Čáslav, Czech Republic, 11. Târgu Mureș, Romania, 12. Mumbai, India

Civic heraldry is heraldry used by municipalities.

Cities, towns, boroughs and other civic bodies often use heraldic arms as symbols for themselves and their authority. The traditions differ somewhat from one country to the other, but some similarities can be seen which distinguish all civic heraldry from state or personal heraldry. The most prominent common element is the mural crown, which is used as a sign for a city and its authority in many countries.

Coat of arms of the city of Mouscron, recognised in 1991 by the Council of Heraldry and Vexillology.

Coat of arms of Bratislava, Slovakia adopted in 1436.

The coat of arms of the municipality of Uccle.

== See also ==
- Cornish corporate heraldry
