= Hender Molesworth =

17th-century Governor of Jamaica

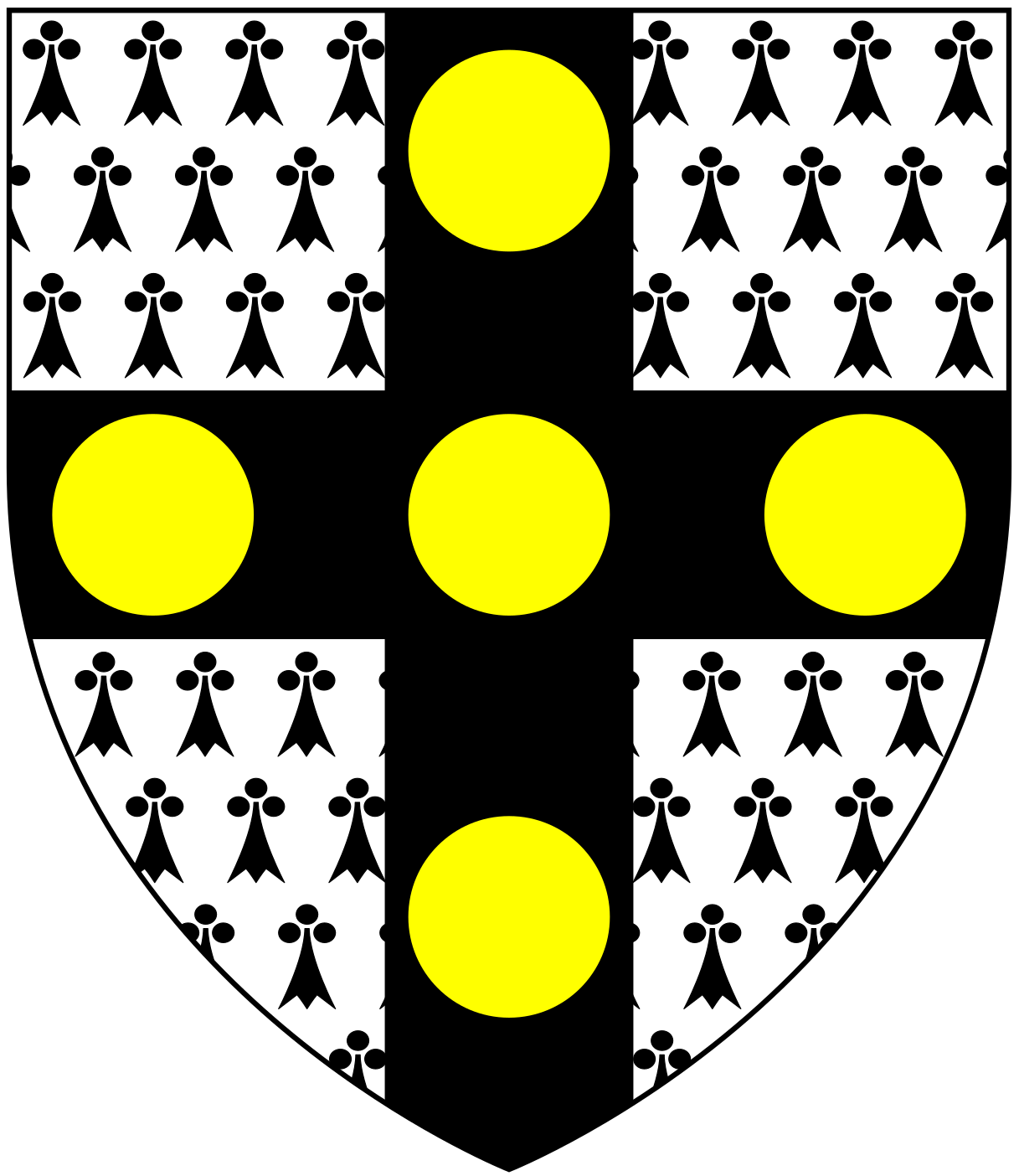
Arms of St Aubyn, as quartered by the Molesworth-St Aubyn Baronets of Pencarrow: Ermine, on a cross sable five bezants

Sir Hender Molesworth, 1st Baronet (ca. 1638 – 27 July 1689) was an English colonial administrator and plantation owner in the Colony of Jamaica. He was a prominent factor for the Royal African Company in Jamaica, in which capacity he was heavily engaged in the purchasing and selling of enslaved African people.

== Biography ==
Molesworth was the second son of Hender Molesworth of Pencarrow and Mary, née Sparke. He became a merchant and plantation owner operating out of Saint Catherine Parish, Jamaica, where he owned 2,480 acres of land. Through his role as a factor for the Royal African Company, he became an influential figure on the island and served as President of the Council and later deputy governor of the colony. As a factor, Molesworth managed the distribution of enslaved Africans imported to the English West Indies. He advocated vigorously for expanded shipments to address the chronic labor shortages that hindered plantation productivity. He also promoted the re-export of slaves from Jamaica to Spain's American colonies, leveraging England's rights under the Asiento de Negros contracts to supply slaves to Spain's territories.

In 1684, he became the acting governor, in which capacity he suppressed the July 1685 slave revolt at Grey’s estate; Molesworth informed James II of the rebellion via council letter and invoked martial law to restore order. He was appointed Governor of Jamaica in 1688. Molesworth was a supporter of the Glorious Revolution and on 19 July 1689 he was created a baronet, of Pencarrow in the Baronetage of England. He married twice, but had no surviving male heir; on his death soon after the creation of his baronetcy, he was succeeded by special remainder by his elder brother, John Molesworth.

Government offices
Preceded by Thomas Lynch	Lieutenant Governor of Jamaica acting 1684–1687	Succeeded by Duke of Albemarle
Preceded by Duke of Albemarle	Lieutenant Governor of Jamaica; 1688–1689	Succeeded by Francis Watson acting
Baronetage of England
New creation	Baronet (of Pencarrow); 1689	Succeeded by John Molesworth
