= Sir John Molesworth, 5th Baronet =

British politician

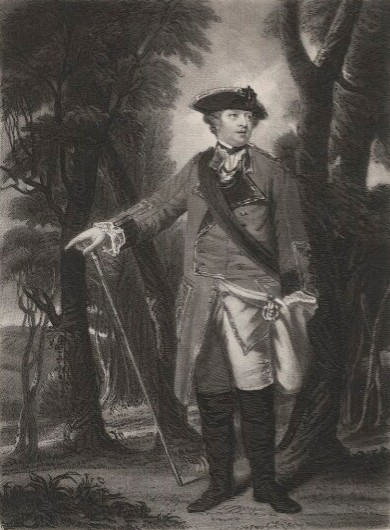
Sir John Molesworth, 5th Baronet, after Joshua Reynolds

Sir John Molesworth, 5th Baronet (1729–1775) was a British politician who sat in the House of Commons from 1765 to 1775.

Molesworth was the son of Sir John Molesworth, 4th Baronet and was born on 12 March 1729. He matriculated at Balliol College, Oxford on 14 March 1749 and was awarded MA on 17 May 1751. He married firstly Frances Smyth, daughter of James Smyth of St Audries, Somerset on 28 September 1755. After she died in 1758, he married Barbara St Aubyn, daughter of Sir John St Aubyn, 3rd Baronet on 2 September 1762.

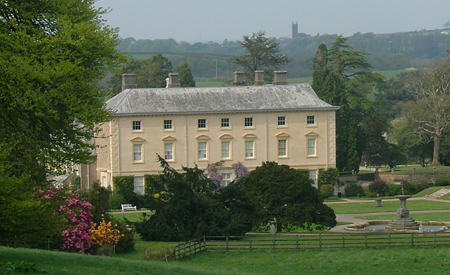
Pencarrow

Molesworth was returned unopposed as Member of Parliament for Cornwall in a by-election in 1765. He succeeded his father in the baronetcy on 4 April 1766 and completed the work on the rebuilding of Pencarrow. He was returned again for Cornwall in the 1768 general election. In 1771 Molesworth started the Truro Bank, together with Edward Eliot and Humphrey Mackworth Praed. In the 1774 general election Molesworth was returned for Cornwall again.

Molesworth died at Pencarrow, on 20 October 1775, and was buried at Egloshayle on 26 October. He was succeeded by his son William.

Parliament of Great Britain
Preceded by James Buller; Sir John St Aubyn, Bt	Member of Parliament for Cornwall; 1765–1775; With: Sir John St Aubyn, Bt 1765–1772; Humphrey Mackworth-Praed 1772–1774; Sir William Lemon, Bt 1774–1775	Succeeded by Edward Eliot; Sir William Lemon, Bt
Baronetage of England
Preceded by John Molesworth	Baronet (of Pencarrow); 1766–1775	Succeeded by William Molesworth
