= Boscawen =

Boscawen may refer to:

- Boscawen (surname)
- Boscawen, New Hampshire, a town in the United States
- Truro Boscawen (electoral division), an electoral division of Cornwall, United Kingdom
- Boscawen Park, a cricket ground in Truro, Cornwall
- Boscawen SSSI, a Site of Special Scientific Interest and a Geological Conservation Review site in Cornwall, United Kingdom.
- Boscawen-Un, a stone circle in Cornwall, United Kingdom
- HMS Boscawen, several ships and a shore establishment
- Boscawen, a British privateer, originally the French frigate Médée (1741), captured by Edward Boscawen in 1744
- Boscawen, pen name of Nathaniel Greene (journalist) (1797–1877)
