= Edward Wynne-Pendarves =

English politician

Edward William Wynne Pendarves
- Born: 6 April 1775; Pendarves, Cornwall, England
- Died: 26 June 1853 (aged 78)
- Education: All Souls College, Oxford
- Occupation: Politician
- Spouse: Tryphena Browne Trist
- Parent(s): John Stackhouse and Susanna Acton

Edward William Wynne Pendarves (6 April 1775 – 26 June 1853) was an English politician.

Born Edward William Stackhouse, he was son of John Stackhouse and his wife Susanna Acton. He served as Member of Parliament (MP) for West Cornwall from the creation of the Constituency on 19 December 1832 until the year of his death.

He was on the Committee of Management of the South Western Railway in 1836. He was one of the proprietors of the University of London, who requisitioned a special general meeting in 1831, to appoint a Select Committee to investigate the lack of progress with the project. He was appointed Deputy-Warden of the Stannaries in 1852.

His memorial is in St Martin and St Meriadoc’s Church, Camborne designed by Edward Hodges Baily.

Parliament of the United Kingdom
New constituency	Member of Parliament for West Cornwall; 1832–1853; With: Sir Charles Lemon, Bt to 1841; Lord Boscawen-Rose 1841–1842; Sir Charles Lemon, Bt 1842–1857	Succeeded by Sir Charles Lemon, Bt and Michael Williams
