= Michael Williams (MP) =

Michael Williams (3 June 1785 – 15 June 1858) was a mining entrepreneur and politician, the MP for West Cornwall from 19 July 1853 until his death in June 1858.

He was the second son of John Williams "the Third" (23 September 1753 – 17 April 1841), the Cornish industrialist, of the Williams family. He bought Caerhays Castle.

On 5 March 1813, he married Elizabeth Eales (d. 1852).

== Business interests ==
The Williams family bought the Morfa Copper Smelting Works in Swansea in 1831. Michael Williams was vested with the responsibility of the Welsh business and was appointed High Sheriff of Glamorgan for 1840.

He was a Director of the Cornwall Railway and chaired its Ordinary Meeting on 3 March 1854, whose proceedings were reported in The Times, in two advertisements on 10 March. He was still the chair of the Company in June 1857, when a Special General Meeting was announced. He was also a partner in the Cornish Bank, which was largely owned by his family.

== Politics ==
He was the only nomination as MP for West Cornwall, at a by-election, following the death of Edward Wynne-Pendarves, on 26 June 1853. Michael Williams and Richard Davey were returned unopposed as Liberals on 19 July 1857. He was re-elected, again without opposition, at the general election of 1857.

== Death ==
The Times received by electric telegraph and published on 16 June, news of his death "a little after 5 o'clock" on 15 June 1858 at Trevince. He was aged 74.

Parliament of the United Kingdom
Preceded by Edward William Wynne Pendarves and Charles Lemon	Member of Parliament for West Cornwall; 1853–1858; With: Charles Lemon to 1857; Richard Davey from 1857	Succeeded by John St Aubyn and Richard Davey
