= Dorset heraldry =

A map of municipal arms in use, or formerly in use, across Dorset.

The heraldry of Dorset concerns the coats of arms of armigerous families historically resident within the county of Dorset in England, and the coats of arms of municipalities and civic institutions within the county.

Municipal and institutional heraldry in Dorset often contains references to the county's coastal setting (through barry wavy, fish, or boats), and to former rulers of the area including Edward the Confessor's cross flory, the golden dragon for Wessex, and Saxon Crowns. Lions and fleur-de-lis are also common heraldic charges in Dorset, appearing on the County Council's arms, among others. It is reasonably common in Dorset for towns and even districts to use arms which have not been granted by the College of Arms. Dorset institutions often use local arms to identify themselves, for example Poole Grammar School and Bournemouth School use variations of the arms of Poole and Bournemouth, respectively.

== See also ==
- Cornish heraldry
- Devon heraldry

== Sources ==
- Monumental Heraldry in Dorset, in An Inventory of the Historical Monuments in Dorset, Volume 5, East, London, 1975, pp. 121–129
- Civic Heraldry of England, Wales, and Northern Ireland
