= Charles Lemon =

British politician

Sir Charles Lemon Bt
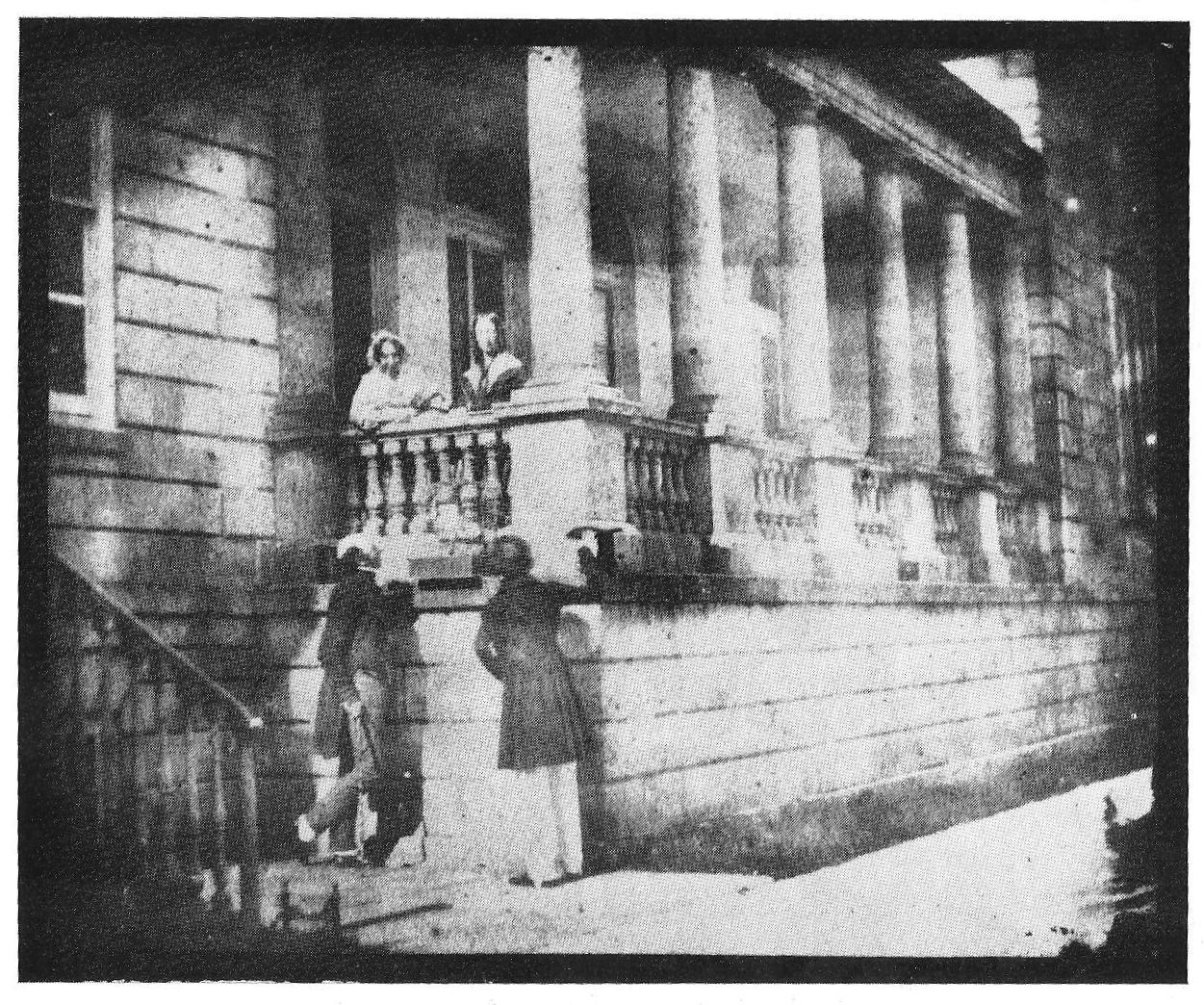
- Early photograph showing people, including Sir Charles Lemon, bottom left, at Carclew. Taken in August 1841 by Henry Fox Talbot, Charles' nephew
- Born: 3 September 1784
- Died: 13 February 1868 (aged 83)
- Occupation: Politician
- Spouse: Lady Charlotte Ann Foxstrangways
- Children: Charles William (died aged 13 months); Charles William (died aged 12); Charlotte Augusta Caroline (died aged 10)
- Parent(s): William Lemon; Jane Buller

Sir Charles Lemon, 2nd Baronet (3 September 1784 – 13 February 1868) was a British Member of Parliament for several constituencies and a baronet.

== Early life ==
He inherited his baronetcy in 1824 upon the death of his father Sir William Lemon, 1st Baronet and Carclew House. His mother was Lady Lemon, who had been the eldest daughter of James Buller MP for Cornwall and Jane, in turn eldest daughter of Allen Bathurst, 1st Earl Bathurst. He attended Harrow School.

== Career ==
Lemon served as Member of Parliament for Penryn in Cornwall from 1807 to 1812 and again from 1830 to 1831. In 1831, he became a Whig Member for Cornwall serving until the Reform Act 1832, whereafter he was Whig Member for West Cornwall until 1841. In 1842 he was again returned for West Cornwall, serving until 1857.

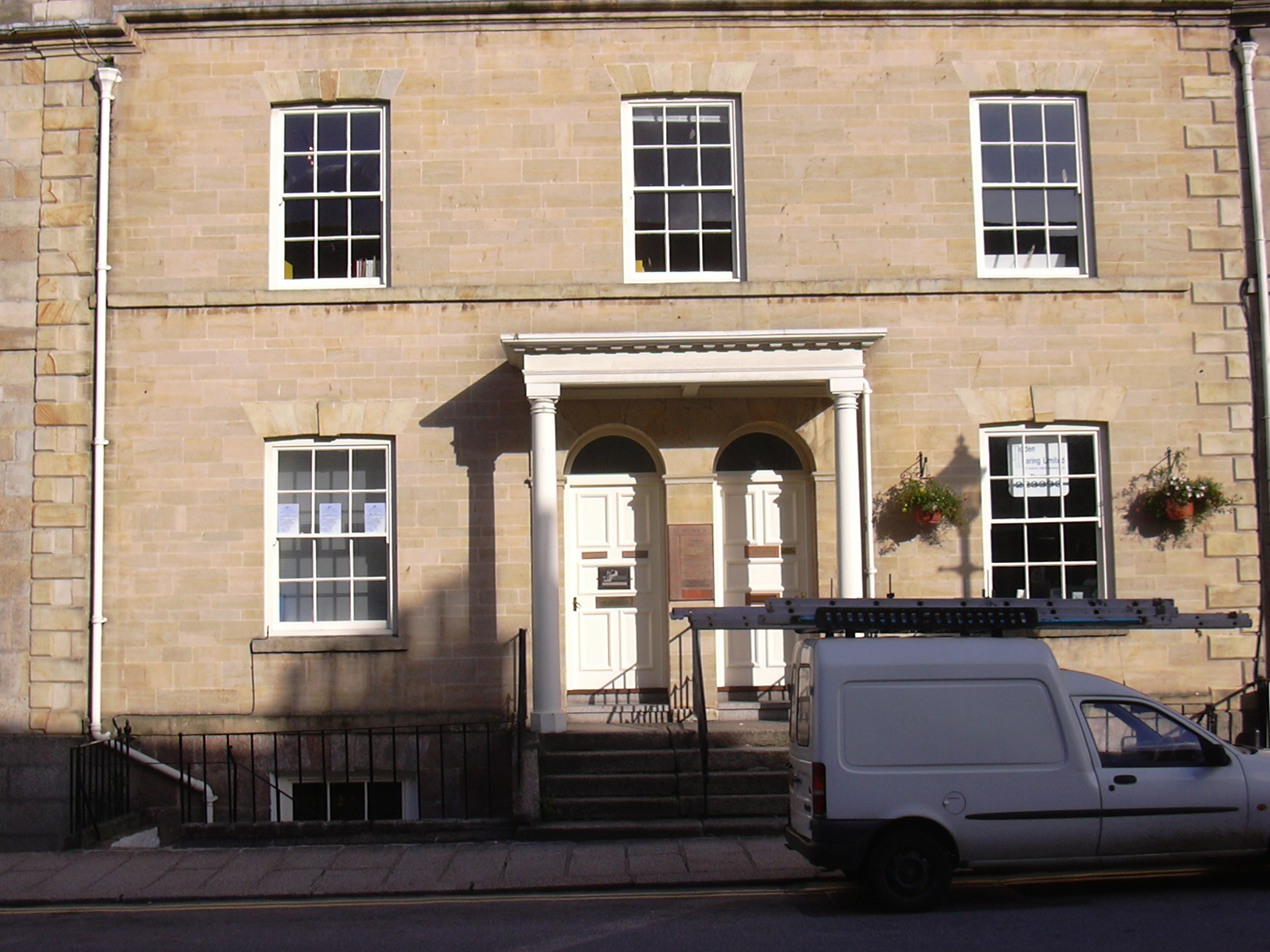
House in Lemon Street, Truro.

In 1827 he was appointed Sheriff of Cornwall. In 1836, he headed the petitioners from the town of Falmouth, Cornwall to the Admiralty, seeking to prevent the removal of the Packet Service.

In 1837, he was appointed to serve on the Transportation Committee of the House of Commons In 1852 he became deputy Warden of the Stannaries and funded the establishment of what is now the Camborne School of Mines. The name "Lemon" lives on in Truro as "Lemon Street" and "Lemon Quay", and a rhododendron Sir Charles Lemon was bred by him from seeds collected by Joseph Dalton Hooker.

He was elected as a Fellow of the Royal Society on 23 May 1822. He was the second president (1836–8) of what is now the Royal Statistical Society. He spoke at the Newcastle Meeting of the British Association in 1838, during a meeting of the Statistical Section. From 1840 to 1856 served as president of the Royal Geological Society of Cornwall. He was president of the Royal Cornwall Polytechnic Society from its foundation until his death. He was president of the Falmouth Board of Guardians from its foundation in 1837 until his death.

He was on the committee of management of the South Western Railway in 1836.

He was a notable Freemason in Cornwall, having been initiated into the Lodge of Love and Honour No. 75 in Falmouth in 1840, becoming its Worshipful Master in 1843, he was appointed the fifth Provincial Grand Master of the province of Cornwall in 1844, after an interregnum of five years, following the death of his predecessor, Sir John St Aubyn, 5th Baronet, in 1839. He held this position until he resigned in 1863.

== Marriage ==
He married on 5 December 1810 to Lady Charlotte Ann Fox-Strangways, 4th daughter of Henry Thomas Fox-Strangways, 2nd Earl of Ilchester. They had two sons, both of whom died young and were named Charles William. The first son died at the age of 13 months. The second was drowned at the age of twelve, at Harrow School. Their daughter, Charlotte Augusta Caroline died at the age of 10, in Aix-les-Bains in 1825.

== Death ==
The baronetcy became extinct on his death on 13 February 1868, as he had no surviving children. The majority of his estate was inherited by Colonel Arthur Tremayne, Sir Charles Lemon's nephew, the son of his sister, Caroline and her husband John Hearle Tremayne, of Heligan. Tremayne was a hero of the Crimean War and a survivor of the Charge of the Light Brigade.

Parliament of the United Kingdom
Preceded by John Bettesworth-Trevanion and Henry Swann	Member of Parliament for Penryn; 1807–1812; With: Henry Swann	Succeeded by Philip Gell and Henry Swann
Preceded by David Barclay and William Manning	Member of Parliament for Penryn; 1830–1831; With: James William Freshfield	Succeeded by James William Freshfield and Charles Stewart
Preceded by Edward William Wynne Pendarves and Sir Richard Rawlinson Vyvyan, Bt	Member of Parliament for Cornwall; 1831–1832; With: Edward William Wynne Pendarves	Constituency abolished
New constituency	Member of Parliament for West Cornwall; 1832–1841; With: Edward Pendarves	Succeeded by Edward Pendarves and Lord Boscawen-Rose
Preceded by Edward Pendarves and Lord Boscawen-Rose	Member of Parliament for West Cornwall; 1842–1857; With: Edward Pendarves to 1853; Michael Williams from 1853	Succeeded by Michael Williams and Richard Davey
Baronetage of Great Britain
Preceded by Sir William Lemon	Baronet (of Carclew, Cornwall); 1824–1868	Extinct
