= Richard Davey (MP) =

- Born: 12 April 1799
- Died: 24 June 1884 (aged 85)
- Education: University of Edinburgh
- Occupation: Politician
- Spouse: Unmarried
- Children: None
- Parent(s): William Davey; Elizabeth née Martyn

Richard Davey (12 April 1799 – 24 June 1884) was one of the two MPs for the West Cornwall constituency for eleven years. He was a Justice of the peace (JP) and a Deputy Lieutenant of the County of Cornwall.

== His family ==
He was a son of William Davey (d. 1827), a solicitor of Redruth and Elizabeth Martyn (born 1756), his wife. His older brother, Stephen (1785–1864) was also a JP and a Deputy Lieutenant of Cornwall. There was another brother, William (died 1849), who was a solicitor. Stephen, William and Richard were "adventurers" in the development of Cornish mines, during the boom period and invested their gains in land. Mines included Wheal Buller and East Wheal Rose. In 1880 Richard Davey, Esq was described as the "Lord of the Mine" of Penhalls.

The family acquired the ancient manor house and estate at Bochym in the parish of Cury.

== Education ==
He was educated at Blundell's School and at the University of Edinburgh.

== Parliamentary service ==
He was elected to the House of Commons for one of the two seats of West Cornwall at the General Election of 1857, as a Whig, following the retirement of Sir Charles Lemon.

Along with Michael Williams, also a Whig, they were elected without opposition on 2 April 1857; John Tremayne, the Conservative candidate, having stood down. In 1859, the Whigs joined the new Liberal Party. He was re-elected for this seat until 1868.

== Death ==
He died 1884, aged 85, unmarried. Despite living at Bochym for many years, he did not own it. It formerly belonged to his brother, Stephen who bequeathed it to his eldest son, Horton Davey who in turn left it to his brother Joshua Sidney Davey (1842–1909), who resided there with his uncle. Richard Davey owned land at St Agnes, Philleigh and other land in the neighbourhood of Truro.

He was buried in the new family vault at St Corentine's Church, Cury; the old one being unsuitable for use. The new vault adjoinined the old one, in an angle formed by the chancel and the Bochym aisle.

Parliament of the United Kingdom
| Preceded by Michael Williams (MP) and Charles Lemon | Member of Parliament for West Cornwall; 1857–1868; With: Michael Williams (MP) to 1858; John St Aubyn from 1858 | Succeeded by John St Aubyn and Arthur Vivian |
