= Cornish corporate heraldry =

Heraldry of the titular peerages of Cornwall

Coats of arms and seals of the County and Duchy of Cornwall, the Diocese of Truro, and of Cornish boroughs and towns.

== Duchy and County heraldry ==
The coat of arms of the Duchy of Cornwall

The coat of arms of Cornwall Council

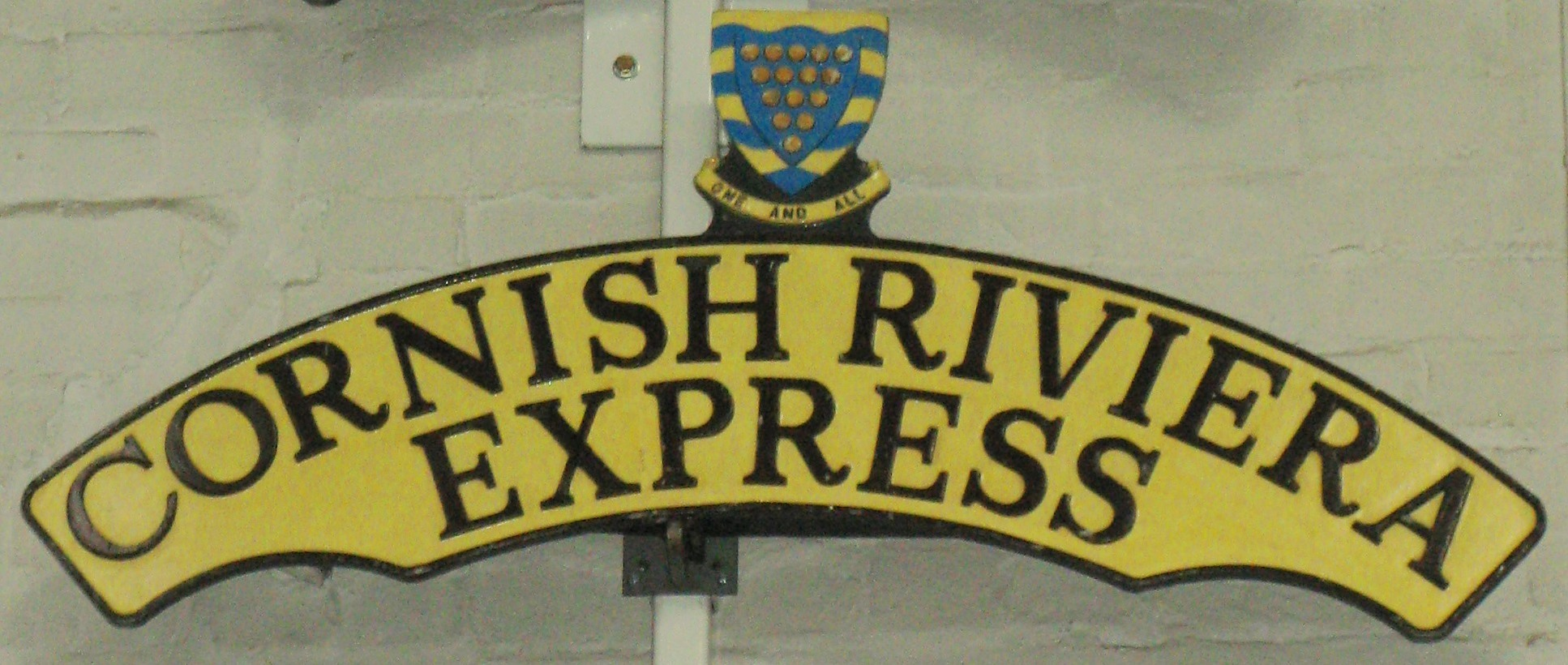
A Cornish Riviera Express headboard (including the shield and motto used in the Cornwall County Council coat of arms)

Duchy

The armorial bearings of the Duchy of Cornwall are:

Arms: Sable, fifteen bezants.

Supporters: On either side a Cornish chough proper [beaked and legged gules], supporting an ostrich feather Argent, penned Or.

Motto: Houmont (or Houmout).

The shield is ensigned with the Heir Apparent's coronet. The supporters were granted by Royal Warrant of 21 June 1968.

Council

The current logo of Cornwall Council features a Cornish chough and the 15 Cornish golden bezants on a black field as used in the arms of the Duchy of Cornwall.

The arms of Cornwall County Council were: Sable fifteen bezants in pile within a bordure barry wavy of eight Argent and Azure. The crest was: On a wreath Argent and Azure a chough proper resting the dexter claw upon a ducal coronet Or. The supporters were: On the dexter side a fisherman holding over the exterior shoulder a net and on the sinister side a miner resting the exterior hand on a sledge hammer all proper. The motto was "One and all".

Mark Antony Lower noted in 1845 that "In general the arms assigned to a county are those of one of its chief, or most antient, boroughs. Thus the arms of Sussex are identical with those of East Grinstead, once the county town; (although within the last 10 years, for some unexplained reason, the fictitious bearings ascribed to the South-Saxon kings have been employed as the official arms of the county.) But the arms of Cornwall are those of its antient feu, attached to the territory, and not to any particular family."

== Borough and town heraldry ==
Bodmin

The seal of the borough of Bodmin was A king enthroned, with the legend "Sigill comune burgensium bodmine".

Bossiney

See Tintagel

Bude-Stratton

The arms of the Bude-Stratton urban district council were: Arg. two bars wavy Az. within a bordure Sa. bezantee on a chief Gu. a cross formed of the field between two clarions Or.

Calstock

The arms of the Calstock parish council is:Sable, Cross Argent, Calstock Viaduct Argent, Two Strawberries Gules, Daffodil Or, Engine House Argent and Picaxe Argent

Camborne

Arms of Camborne

The seal of the Camborne local board was a mine shaft and engine house depicted with the date 1873 and the legend "The Local Board for the District of Camborne".

The arms used by the current Camborne town council employs a different design.

Camelford

The seal of the borough of Camelford was Arg. a camel passing through a ford of water all proper with the legend "Sigillum Vill de Camillford".

Falmouth

The seal of Falmouth was An eagle displayed with two heads and on each wing with a tower (based on the arms of Killigrew). The arms of the borough of Falmouth were Arg. a double-headed eagle displayed Sa. each wing charged with a tower Or. in base issuant from the water barry wavy a rock also Sa. thereon surmounting the tail of the eagle a staff also proper flying therefrom a pennant Gu.

Fowey

The seal of the town of Fowey was on a shield a ship of three masts on the sea her topsail furled with the legend "Sigillum oppidi de Fowy Anno Dom. 1702".

Grampound

The seal of the borough of Grampound was A bridge of two arches over a river, the dexter end in perspective showing the passage over at the sinister and a tree issuing from the base against the bridge on the centre an escutcheon of the arms of the family of Cornwall viz. Arg. a lion rampant Gu. within a bordure Sa.

Helston

The seal of the borough of Helston was St Michael his wings expanded standing on a gateway the two towers domed upon the upturned dragon impaling it with his spear and bearing upon his left arm an escutcheon of the arms of England viz. Gu. three lions passant guardant in pale Or. with the legend "Sigillum comunitatis helleston burg".

Launceston

The arms of the town of Launceston are Gu. a triple circular tower in a pyramidical form Or the first battlements mounted with cannon of the last, all within a bordure Az. charged with eight towers domed on the second. A badge was granted on 26 Mar 1906, being the first ever granted to a civic body: A keep or castle Gold.

Liskeard

The seal of the borough of Liskeard was Ar. a fleur-de-lis and perched thereon and respecting each other two birds in chief two annulets and in flank two feathers.

Looe

The seal of East Looe was An antique one-mast vessel in it a man and boy against the side of the hulk three escutcheons each charges with three bends, with the legend "Si: comunetatis de Loo".

The seal of West Looe was An armed man holding a bow in his right hand and an arrow in his left, with the legend "Por-tu-an other wys Westlo".

Lostwithiel

The seal of the borough of Lostwithiel was A shield charged with a castle rising from water between two thistles, in the water two fish, with the legend "Sigillum burgi de Lostwithyel et Penknight in Cornubia".

Marazion

The seal of the borough of Marazion was on a shield the arms three castles triple turreted, with the legend "Semper Eadem".

Millbrook

The seal of the borough of Millbrook was A mill with waterwheel in a stream of water amid trees and hounds, with the legend "Sigillum de Millbrookia".

Newquay

The arms of the urban district council of Newquay were Or on a saltire Az. four herrings respectant Arg.

Padstow

The seal of the borough of Padstow was A ship with three masts the sails furled and an anchor hanging from the bow, with the legend "Padstow".

Penryn

The arms of the borough of Penryn are Sa. a Saracen's head Or in a bordure of eight bezants.

Penzance

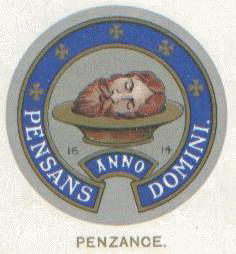
Common seal of the Borough of Penzance, used in lieu of a coat of arms 1614–1934 (now the Mayoral Seal)

The old arms of Penzance were the head of St John the Baptist on a charger, with the legend "Pensans anno Domini 1614".

The arms of the borough are Arg. a Paschal lamb proper in base a Maltese cross Az. on a chief embattled of the last between two keys in saltire wards upwards Or and a saltire couped Arg. a plate charged with a dagger point downwards Gu.

St Austell

Arms of St Austell

The arms of St Austell are Arg. a saltire raguly Gu.

St Germans

The seal of the borough of St Germans was St German seated on a throne, with the legend "S. Prepositure Sci Germani in laya".

St Ives

The seal of St Ives was Arg. an ivy branch overspreading the whole field Vert, with the legend "Sigillum Burgi St. Ives in Com. Cornub. 1690".

St Mawes

The seal of St Mawes was Az. a bend lozengy Or between a tower in the sinister chief Arg. and a ship with three masts the sail furled in the dexter base of the second, with the legend "Commune Sigillum Burgi de St. Mawes al Mauditt.

Saltash

The arms of Saltash are Az. the base water proper in pale an escutcheon Or thereon a lion rampant Gu. within a bordure Sa. bezantee ensigned with a prince's coronet of the third on either side of the escutcheon an ostrich feather Arg. labelled Or.

There are seals of Saltash: A three-masted ship with sails furled at anchor; and An escutcheon charges with a lion rampant within a bordure bezantee resting upon water surmounted by a coronet composed on crosses patee and fleurs-de-lis and either side an ostrich feather; with the legends "Sigillum aquate Saltash" and "Sigillum Saltashe" respectively.

Tintagel (or Bossiney)

Borough seal: A castle with two towers embattled and domed and joined to each other by a circular wall all on a mount, in the base water. Another description: King Arthur's castle twin-turreted with drawbridge lowered over the water, with the legend "Sigillum Maioris et Burgiensiu Burgi de Tintaioel".

Tregony

The arms of the borough of Tregony were A pomegranate Or slipped and leaved Vert.

Truro

The arms of the city of Truro are Gu. the base wavy of six Arg. and Az. thereon an ancient ship of three masts under sail on each topmast a banner of St George, on the waves in base two fishes of the second.

Tywardreath

The seal of the borough of Tywardreath was A shield of Arms a saltire between four fleurs-de-lis, with the legend "Tywardreath".

== Ecclesiastical heraldry ==
Bodmin

Bodmin Priory bore the arms Azure three salmon naiant in pale Argent; and the Monastery Or on a chevron Azure between three lion's heads Purpure three annulets Or.

Launceston

The arms of Launceston Priory were Arg. guttee de sang a cock Gu. on a chief of the last three roses Or.

Diocese of Truro

The coat of arms of the Diocese of Truro

The arms of the diocese include a saltire gules on which are a crossed sword and key: below this is a fleur de lys sable, all surrounded by a border sable charged with 15 bezants. The saltire is the cross of St Patrick, taken to be the emblem of the Celtic church; the sword and key are emblems of St Peter and Paul, the patrons of Exeter Cathedral, and the fleur de lys represents St Mary, patron of the cathedral. The border is derived from the arms of the Duchy of Cornwall. They were designed by the College of Heralds in 1877 and are blazoned thus:

"Argent, on a saltire gules, a key, ward upward, in bend, surmounted by a sword, hilt upward, in bend sinister, both or. In base, a fleur de lys sable. The whole within a bordure sable, fifteen bezants. Ensigned with a mitre."

== See also ==
- Cornish heraldry

== Bibliography ==
- Pascoe, W. H. (1979). A Cornish Armory. Padstow, Cornwall: Lodenek Press. ISBN 0-902899-76-7.; pp. 131–137 "Cornish corporate heraldry" (with illustrations for Helston, Bodmin, Tintagel, Penzance, Penryn, Camborne, Launceston, Tregony, see of Truro, and Duchy of Cornwall)
