= George Boscawen, 2nd Earl of Falmouth =

British peer and politician

The Right Honourable The Earl of Falmouth

Personal details
- Born: 8 July 1811
- Died: 29 August 1852 (aged 41)
- Parent(s): Edward Boscawen, 1st Earl of Falmouth and Anne Frances Bankes
- Occupation: Politician

George Henry Boscawen, 2nd Earl of Falmouth (8 July 1811 – 29 August 1852), styled Lord Boscawen-Rose between 1821 and 1841, was a British peer and politician.

Falmouth was the son of Edward Boscawen, 1st Earl of Falmouth and Anne Frances Bankes. He was returned to Parliament as one of two representatives for Cornwall West in July 1841, a seat he held until December of the same year, when he succeeded his father in the earldom and took his seat in the House of Lords.

Lord Falmouth died in August 1852, aged 41. On his death, the earldom became extinct, while he was succeeded in the viscountcy of Falmouth and barony of Boscawen-Rose by his first cousin, Evelyn Boscawen.

Parliament of the United Kingdom
Preceded by Edward Wynne-Pendarves; Sir Charles Lemon, Bt	Member of Parliament for Cornwall West; 1841 – 1842; With: Edward Wynne-Pendarves	Succeeded by Edward Wynne-Pendarves; Sir Charles Lemon, Bt
Peerage of the United Kingdom
Preceded by Edward Boscawen	Earl of Falmouth; 1841–1852	Extinct
Peerage of Great Britain
Preceded by Edward Boscawen	Viscount Falmouth; 1841–1852	Succeeded by Evelyn Boscawen
