= Place, Fowey =

Grade I listed building in Fowey, Cornwall, England

Place
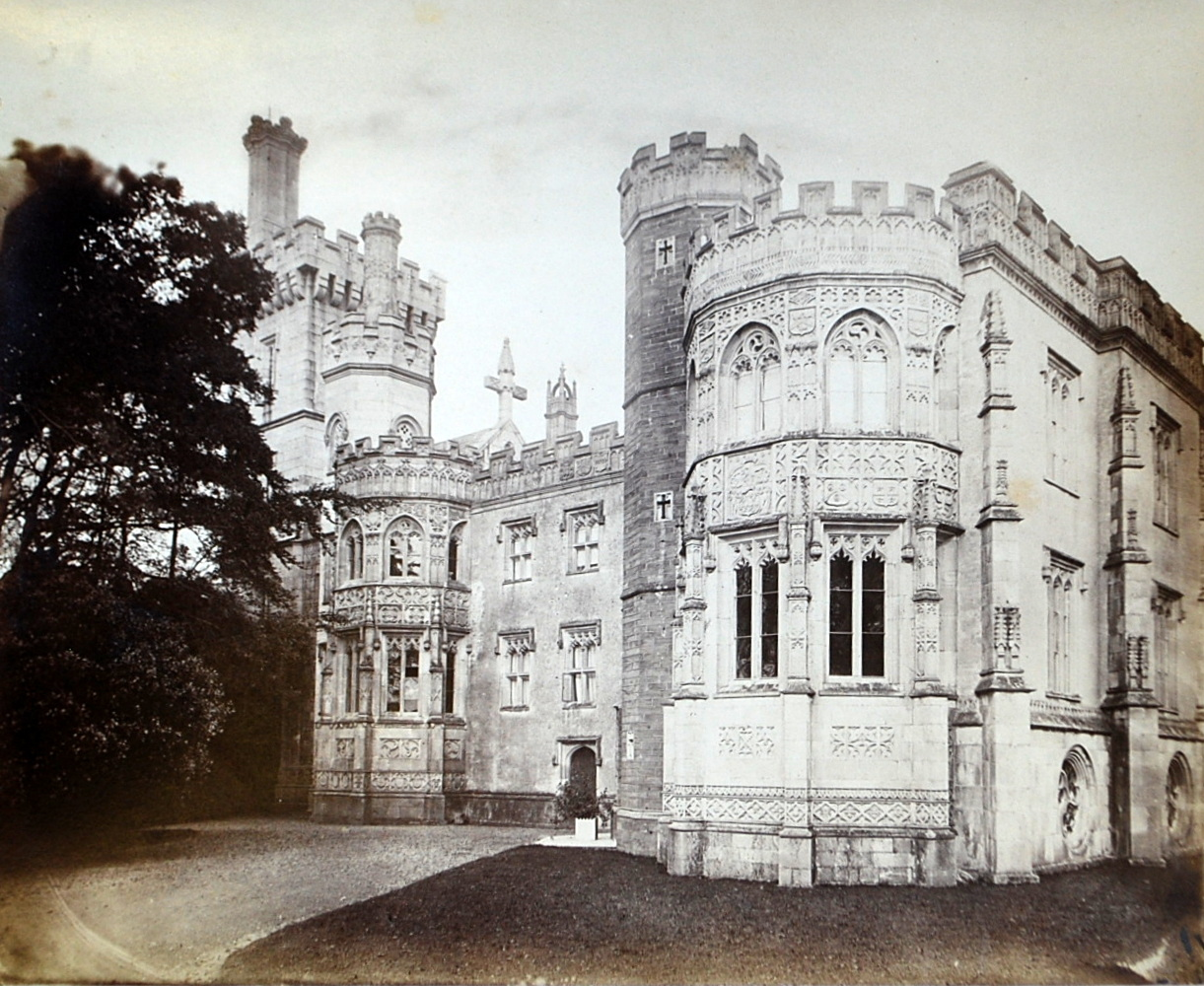
- South front, c. 1870

- Location within Cornwall
- 50.33587°N 4.63593°W
- Location: Fowey, Cornwall, England

Listed Building – Grade I
- Designated: 13 March 1951
- Reference no.: 1218869

Place is a fortified house and Grade I listed building located in Fowey, Cornwall, England. Home of the Treffry family since the thirteenth century, the original structure was a fifteenth-century tower, which was defended against the French in 1457 by Elizabeth Treffry. It was strengthened soon afterwards, largely rebuilt in the sixteenth century and remodelled in the nineteenth century, the east front dating mostly from 1817 to 1845. The house is not open to the public except on special occasions.

== History ==
Place is the seat of the Treffry family, and played an important role in defending the town against the marauding French. The original tower dated from the fifteenth century and it was here, in 1457, that Elizabeth Treffry led the defence. The tower was strengthened and largely rebuilt in the early sixteenth century.

Toller's Name Act 1734
- Act of Parliament
- Parliament of Great Britain
- Long title: An Act to enable William Toller, now called William Toller Treffry, Gentleman, and his Issue Male, to take and use the Surname of Treffry only, pursuant to the Deed of Settlement of John Treffry Esquire, deceased.
- Citation: 8 Geo. 2. c. 16 Pr.
- Territorial extent: Great Britain

Dates
- Royal assent: 15 May 1735
- Commencement: 14 January 1735 (Note: Start of session.)

Status: Current legislation

In 1731 John Treffry left the house, on his death, to his nephew William Toller, who took on the surname of Treffry – in addition to his own – by a private act of Parliament, Toller's Name Act 1734 (8 Geo. 2. c. 16 Pr.).

In 1779 it again came into the possession of two sisters who were not direct descendants of the family After the death in 1808 of William Esco Treffry, it was inherited together with the family estates by his nephew Joseph Thomas Austen, a bachelor, who lived there with his mother. He changed his name by deed poll to Joseph Treffry in 1836. The house at this time was in a state of disrepair. Starting in 1813, he undertook much rebuilding and renovation, the work continuing for about thirty years. In 1820 he demolished the remains of the high tower that Elizabeth Treffry had defended so staunchly and erected a new towerin granite. The house was inherited by the Rev Edward Treffry in the nineteenth century. He is said to have been preaching a sermon when a wrecked vessel was reported. Being keen to share in the spoils, he told his congregation to remain seated while he made his way to the porch. Then saying "Right, now we can all start fair", he joined his congregation in sprinting to the shore.

== The house ==
Place was designated as a Grade I listed building on 13 March 1951. It is a large house built of stone, dating from the fifteenth and sixteenth centuries. The south front has two storeys, each with five windows, and a pair of ornamented early sixteenth century bay windows. There are external turrets and a large square tower at the west end with a corbelled and battlemented parapet. The tower was built to replace an earlier tower which fell in the eighteenth century.

== The garden ==
Madeline Agar designed the garden at Place in the 1920s. The rose garden and the rockery are still in existence.

== In Literature ==
Elizabeth Treffry's defence is commemorated in Letitia Elizabeth Landon's poem 'Fowey Harbour, and Polruan Castle, &c.', published 1831.

== Bibliography ==
- Higham, Robert A., 1999, 'Castles, Fortified Houses and Fortified Towns in the Middle Ages' in Kain, R. and Ravenhill, W., Historical Atlas of South-West England (University of Exeter Press) pp. 136–43
- Salter, Mike, 1999, The Castles of Devon and Cornwall (Malvern) p. 20
- King, D. J. C., 1983, Castellarium Anglicanum (London: Kraus) Vol. 1, p. 78
- Pevsner, N. revised by Enid Radcliffe, 1970, The Buildings of England: Cornwall (Harmondsworth) pp. 58–9
- Turner, T. H. and Parker, J. H., 1859, Some Account of Domestic Architecture in England (Oxford) Vol. 3, pt. 2, p. 361
