= Smith-Dorrien =

== Surname ==
Smith-Dorrien is a surname. Notable people with the surname include:

- Horace Lockwood Smith-Dorrien (1858–1930), British Army General
- Olive Smith-Dorrien (1881–1951), philanthropist and wife of Horace Smith-Dorrien
- Thomas Smith-Dorrien-Smith (1846–1918), Lord Proprietor of the Isles of Scilly 1872–1918
- Arthur Dorrien-Smith (1876–1955), Lord Proprietor of the Isles of Scilly 1918–1920
- Robert Dorrien-Smith (born 1951), British businessman and politician

== Places ==
- Smith-Dorrien House, a building in Aldershot, Hampshire, UK
- Smith-Dorrien Trail, a road in Alberta, Canada
