= Ashley Allanson =

English footballer

Personal information
- Full name: Ashley Allanson
- Date of birth: 13 November 1986 (age 39)
- Place of birth: Hull, England
- Height: 5 ft 11 in (1.80 m)
- Position: Midfielder

Team information
- Current team: Bridlington Town

Senior career*
Years	Team	Apps	(Gls)
2004–2005	Hull City	0	(0)
2005–2007	Scunthorpe United	1	(0)
2007–2008	Farsley Celtic		
2008–2016	Bridlington Town		
2016–	Hall Road Rangers		
- * Club domestic league appearances and goals as of 17:44, 1 December 2009 (UTC)

Ashley Allanson (born 13 November 1986) is a footballer, who plays in midfield at Bridlington Town.

His previous clubs include Hull City, Scunthorpe United and Farsley Celtic. Allanson had two loan spells at Farsley before making the deal permanent before the 2007–08 season. After making 15 appearances during the 2007–08 season he was released and joined Bridlington Town. He played against Farsley in a pre-season friendly in which his new team lost 6–0. Ashley has played for the England Futsal team and the England Universities 11-a-side team. He is a coach at the Hull City Centre of Excellence and holds a UEFA B football coaching badge.
