= Robert Allanson =

British architect (1735–1773)

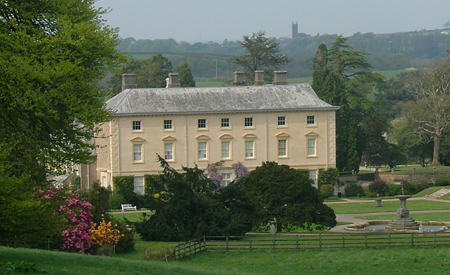
Pencarrow, designed by Robert Allanson

Robert Allanson (1735–1773) was a British architect from York. He designed Pencarrow house in Cornwall, a Palladian mansion built for the Molesworth family in 1765–75.
