= West Cornwall (constituency) =

Former parliamentary constituency in the United Kingdom

- Former county constituency for the House of Commons
- Context of 1832-1868. Extract from 1837 result: the western, peach area.
- County: Cornwall

1832–1885
- Seats: Two
- Created from: Cornwall, St Mawes
- Replaced by: Camborne, St Austell, St Ives and Truro

West Cornwall was a county constituency in the House of Commons of the Parliament of the United Kingdom. It elected two Members of Parliament (MPs) by the bloc vote system of election.

== Boundaries ==
In 1832 the county of Cornwall, in south west England, was split for parliamentary purposes into two county divisions. These were the West division (with a place of election at Truro) and East Cornwall (where voting took place at Bodmin). Each division returned two members to Parliament.

The parliamentary boroughs included in the West division, between 1832 and 1885, (whose non-resident 40 shilling freeholders were eligible to vote in the county constituency) were Helston, Penryn and Falmouth, St Ives and Truro. (Source: Stooks Smith).

1832–1885: The Hundreds of Kerrier, and Penwith, and in the hundred of Powder, the western division, i.e. the parishes of St Allen, St Anthony in Roseland, St Clement, Cornelly, Creed-with-Grampound, Cuby-with-Tregony, St Erme, Feock, Gerrans, St Just in Roseland (with St Mawes), Kea, Kenwyn, Lamorran, Merther, St Michael Penkevil, Philleigh, Probus, Ruan Lanihorne, Truro St Mary, Veryan, and in the hundred of Pydar, the parishes of St Agnes, Crantock, Cubert, Newlyn, St Enoder, and Perranzabuloe, and the Isles of Scilly.

== History ==
During the 53-year history of this division, there was never a contested election. Only once was a Conservative member returned, but he only represented the constituency for a few months before becoming the 2nd Earl of Falmouth.

In 1885 this division was abolished, when the East and West Cornwall county divisions were replaced by six new single-member county constituencies. These were Bodmin (the South-Eastern division), Camborne (North-Western division), Launceston (North-Eastern division), St Austell (Mid division), St Ives (the Western division) and Truro. In addition the last remaining Cornish borough constituency was Penryn and Falmouth.

== Members of Parliament ==
- Constituency created (1832)

Election	First member	First party	Second member	Second party
1832	Sir Charles Lemon, Bt	Whig	Edward Wynne-Pendarves	Whig
1841	Lord Boscawen-Rose	Conservative	Edward Wynne-Pendarves	Whig
1842 by-election	Sir Charles Lemon, Bt	Whig	Edward Wynne-Pendarves	Whig
1853 by-election	Sir Charles Lemon, Bt	Whig	Michael Williams	Whig
1857	Richard Davey	Whig	Michael Williams	Whig
1858 by-election	Richard Davey	Whig	Sir John St Aubyn, Bt	Radical
1859	Richard Davey	Liberal	Sir John St Aubyn, Bt	Liberal
1868	Arthur Vivian	Liberal	Sir John St Aubyn, Bt	Liberal
1885	Constituency abolished			

== Election results ==
=== Elections in the 1830s ===
General election 1832: Cornwall Western (2 seats)
Party	Candidate	Votes	%
Whig	Charles Lemon	Unopposed	
Whig	Edward Wynne-Pendarves	Unopposed	
Registered electors		3,353	
Whig win (new seat)			
Whig win (new seat)			

Charles Lemon had been Whig Member of Parliament for Cornwall prior to the 1832 election. Edward Wynne-Pendarves had also been a Member of Parliament in the previous parliament.

General election 1835: Cornwall Western (2 seats)
Party	Candidate	Votes	%
Whig	Charles Lemon	Unopposed	
Whig	Edward Wynne-Pendarves	Unopposed	
Registered electors		3,612	
Whig hold			
Whig hold			

General election 1837: Cornwall Western (2 seats)
Party	Candidate	Votes	%
Whig	Charles Lemon	Unopposed	
Whig	Edward Wynne-Pendarves	Unopposed	
Registered electors		4,928	
Whig hold			
Whig hold			

=== Elections in the 1840s ===
General election 1841: Cornwall Western (2 seats)
Party	Candidate	Votes	%	±%
Conservative	George Boscawen	Unopposed		
Whig	Edward Wynne-Pendarves	Unopposed		
Registered electors		5,040		
Conservative gain from Whig				
Whig hold				

Boscawen-Rose succeeded to the peerage, becoming 2nd Earl of Falmouth and causing a by-election.

By-election, 16 February 1842: Cornwall Western (1 seat)
Party	Candidate	Votes	%	±%
Whig	Charles Lemon	Unopposed		
Whig gain from Conservative				

General election 1847: Cornwall Western (2 seats)
Party	Candidate	Votes	%	±%
Whig	Charles Lemon	Unopposed		
Whig	Edward Wynne-Pendarves	Unopposed		
Registered electors		5,259		
Whig hold				
Whig gain from Conservative				

=== Elections in the 1850s ===
General election 1852: Cornwall Western (2 seats)
Party	Candidate	Votes	%	±%
Whig	Charles Lemon	Unopposed		
Whig	Edward Wynne-Pendarves	Unopposed		
Registered electors		4,649		
Whig hold				
Whig hold				

Wynne-Pendarves' death caused a by-election.

By-election, 18 July 1853: Cornwall Western (1 seat)
Party	Candidate	Votes	%	±%
Whig	Michael Williams	Unopposed		
Whig hold				

General election 1857: Cornwall Western (2 seats)
Party	Candidate	Votes	%	±%
Whig	Richard Davey	Unopposed		
Whig	Michael Williams	Unopposed		
Registered electors		4,542		
Whig hold				
Whig hold				

John Tremayne had planned to stand for election, but withdrew.

Williams' death caused a by-election.

By-election, 5 July 1858: Cornwall Western (1 seat)
Party	Candidate	Votes	%	±%
Radical	John St Aubyn	Unopposed		
Radical gain from Whig				

George Williams, younger son of Michael, had withdrawn to avoid "disturbing the County".

General election 1859: Cornwall Western (2 seats)
Party	Candidate	Votes	%	±%
Liberal	Richard Davey	Unopposed		
Liberal	John St Aubyn	Unopposed		
Registered electors		4,897		
Liberal hold				
Liberal hold				

=== Elections in the 1860s ===
General election 1865: Cornwall Western (2 seats)
Party	Candidate	Votes	%	±%
Liberal	Richard Davey	Unopposed		
Liberal	John St Aubyn	Unopposed		
Registered electors		4,615		
Liberal hold				
Liberal hold				

General election 1868: Cornwall Western (2 seats)
Party	Candidate	Votes	%	±%
Liberal	Arthur Vivian	Unopposed		
Liberal	John St Aubyn	Unopposed		
Registered electors		8,168		
Liberal hold				
Liberal hold				

=== Elections in the 1870s ===
General election 1874: Cornwall Western (2 seats)
Party	Candidate	Votes	%	±%
Liberal	Arthur Vivian	Unopposed		
Liberal	John St Aubyn	Unopposed		
Registered electors		7,494		
Liberal hold				
Liberal hold				

=== Elections in the 1880s ===
General election 1880: Cornwall Western (2 seats)
Party	Candidate	Votes	%	±%
Liberal	Arthur Vivian	Unopposed		
Liberal	John St Aubyn	Unopposed		
Registered electors		6,987		
Liberal hold				
Liberal hold				

== See also ==
- List of former United Kingdom Parliament constituencies
- Parliamentary representation from Cornwall

== Sources ==
- Boundaries of Parliamentary Constituencies 1885-1972, compiled and edited by F.W.S. Craig (Parliamentary Reference Publications 1972)
- British Parliamentary Election Results 1832-1885, compiled and edited by F.W.S. Craig (Macmillan Press 1977)
- The Parliaments of England by Henry Stooks Smith (1st edition published in three volumes 1844–50), second edition edited (in one volume) by F.W.S. Craig (Political Reference Publications 1973)
- Who's Who of British Members of Parliament: Volume I 1832-1885, edited by M. Stenton (The Harvester Press 1976)
- Who's Who of British Members of Parliament, Volume II 1886-1918, edited by M. Stenton and S. Lees (Harvester Press 1978)
- Leigh Rayment's Historical List of MPs – Constituencies beginning with "C" (part 6)
