= William Lemon =

British politician

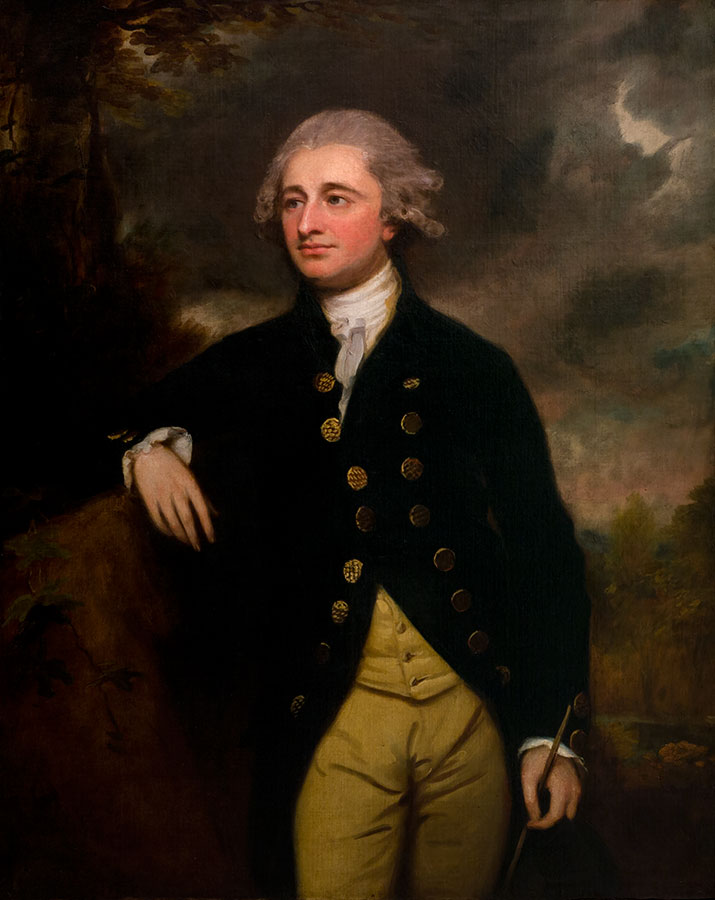
Sir William Lemon, 1st Baronet. Portrait by George Romney, 1788.

Sir William Lemon, 1st Baronet (11 October 1748 – 11 December 1824) was a Member of Parliament for Cornish constituencies from 1770 to 1824, a total of 54 years.

== Background ==
He was the son of William Lemon and Anne, the daughter of John Willyams of Carnanton House and the grandson of William Lemon (1696–1760), who acquired the family estate at Carclew in 1749.

Lemon's younger brother John (1754–1814) became a Member of Parliament for Saltash and Truro and was the owner of Pollevillan. John Lemon died on 5 April 1814.

His sister Anne married John Buller MP for Exeter and West Looe.

== Education ==
He was educated at Christ Church, Oxford and with a Grand Tour.

== Parliamentary service ==
He was Member of Parliament for Penryn 1770–1774 and Cornwall 1774–1824, a total of 54 years.

He was created Baronet Lemon of Carclew, Cornwall on 24 May 1774.

== Marriage ==
He married Jane, the eldest daughter of James Buller, MP for Cornwall and his wife Jane, who was eldest daughter of Allen Bathurst, 1st Earl Bathurst. Jane Lemon died 17 June 1823.

== Children ==
SOURCE: Debrett's Baronetage 1839.

- Anne, married Sir John Davie in 1796.
- Maria married Francis Jodrell in 1807.
- William born 1774 died 1799.
- Louisa, married Lt. Col. George Hart Dyke in 1802. She died in 1839.
- Harriet, married Francis Basset, 1st Baron de Dunstanville and Basset in 1824. She died 30 December 1864.
- John, born 1779 died young.
- Emma
- Frances
- Isabella Jane married her cousin Anthony Buller in 1805
- Charles, 2nd Baronet
- Tryphena-Octavia – died young
- Caroline Matilda married John Hearle Tremayne in 1818

== Death and succession ==
He died on 11 December 1824 and was succeeded in his baronetcy by his son Charles Lemon (1784–1868).

Parliament of Great Britain
Preceded by Francis Basset and Hugh Pigot	Member of Parliament for Penryn; 1770–1774; With: Hugh Pigot	Succeeded by Sir George Osborn and William Chaytor
Preceded by Sir John Molesworth and Humphrey Mackworth-Praed	Member of Parliament for Cornwall; 1774–1800; With: Sir John Molesworth to 1775; Edward Eliot 1775–1784; Sir John Molesworth 1784–1790; Francis Gregor from 1790	Succeeded by self (in Parliament of the United Kingdom)
Parliament of the United Kingdom
Preceded by self (in Parliament of Great Britain)	Member of Parliament for Cornwall; 1801–1824; With: Francis Gregor to 1806; John Hearle Tremayne from 1806	Succeeded by John Hearle Tremayne and Sir Richard Rawlinson Vyvyan, Bt
Baronetage of Great Britain
New creation	Baronet (of Carclew, Cornwall); 1774–1824	Succeeded by Sir Charles Lemon
