= Carclew House =

Coordinates: 50°12′N 05°06′W

Carclew House circa 1830

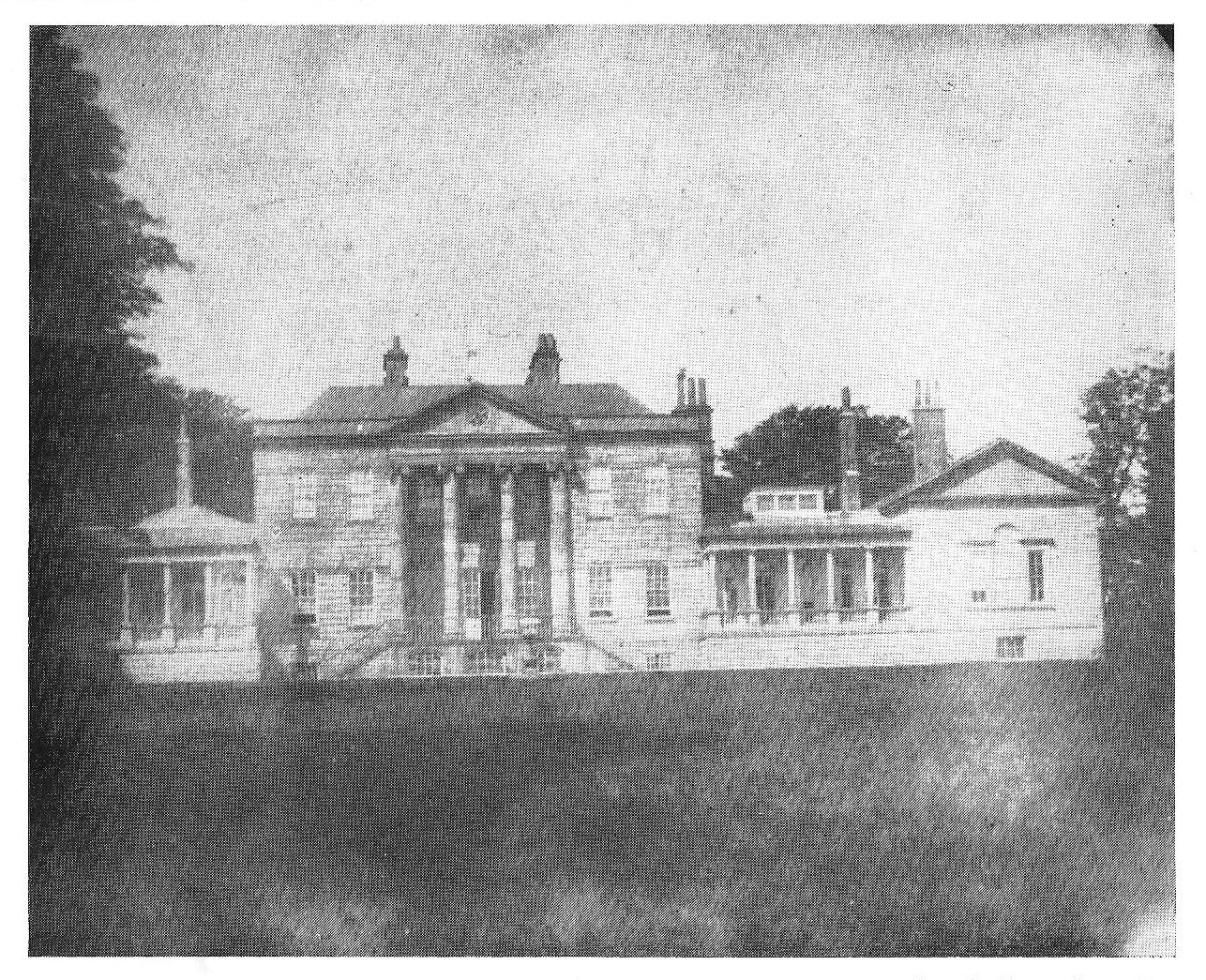
Early photograph of Carclew House, taken in August 1841 by Henry Fox Talbot

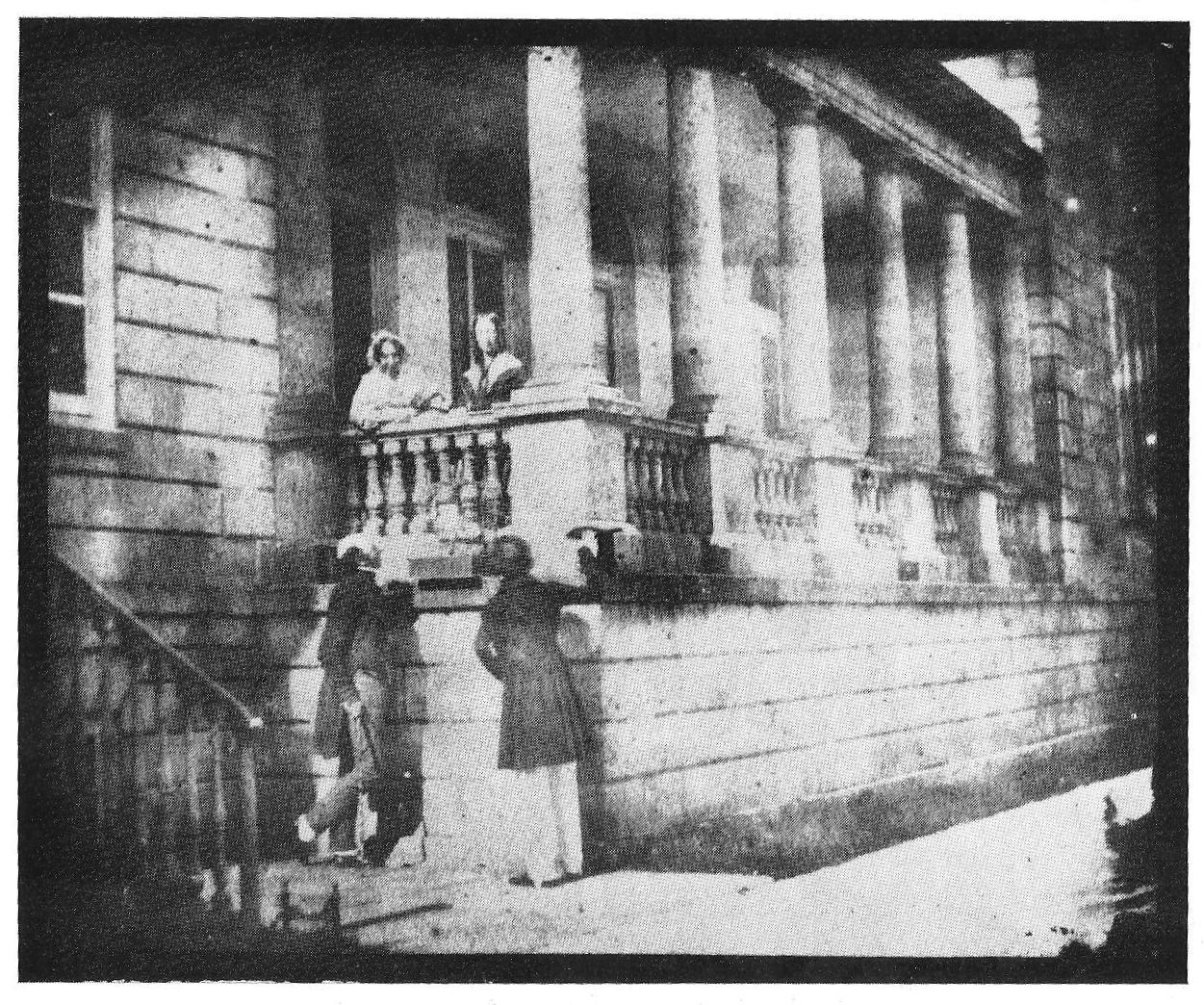
Early photograph showing people, including Sir Charles Lemon, left, at one of the colonnaded wings, taken in August 1841 by Henry Fox Talbot

Carclew House, one of Britain's lost houses, was a large Palladian country house near Mylor in Cornwall, England, United Kingdom. It was situated at grid reference SW 787 380 approximately three miles north of Falmouth.

Carclew House was for some generations owned by the Bonython family. It was rebuilt in the 18th century and again in the early 19th century but was destroyed by fire in 1934.

== Design and construction ==
The original house and estate were purchased by a wealthy merchant William Lemon (1696–1760) circa 1739. Lemon's townhouse in Truro had been designed by the architect Thomas Edwards, and it was again to Edwards that Lemon turned to substantially increase and modernise his new country house Carclew.

Work began in 1739, the enhancement to the mansion included flanking the main block with colonnades terminated by small pavilions in the fashionable Palladian manner, the design was similar in appearance to drawings of Palladio's planned Villa Ragona.

The house is now a ruin, and is home to many wildlife species. The original stone pillars are still there today.

== Enlargement ==
At the beginning of the 19th century, William Lemon's grandson Sir William Lemon (1748–1824) had the house expanded further. He employed the architect William Wood (1746–1818) to create new wings in the place of the pavilions designed by Edwards. Work began in 1799 with the east wing being built in 1800 and the west wing in 1802. The wings were linked to the corps de logis by raised colonnaded connecting wings on the site of Edwards's original colonnades.

Sir Charles Lemon was amongst the first people in England to receive and grow rhododendron seed from Sir Joseph Hooker, who had sent seed directly to Carclew House from his Himalayan expedition of 1848–1850. The Rhododendron arboretum specimen at Carclew, planted c. 1850 by Sir Charles became one of the most famous in Cornwall. By 1928 it was about 35 feet high.

== 1934 fire and after ==
In 1934 Carclew was destroyed by fire and has been derelict since. It was then owned by Captain Charles H. Tremayne, a descendant of Sir Charles Lemon. In the late 1930s though, one wing was ‘made habitable by hard work’ and brought into service as a reception centre for refugees coming from Europe. This was a project of the Society of Friends’ Peace Committee and was run by James T. Baily.

The terraced gardens complete with their water fountains and cascades remain and are privately owned and not open to the public. A new house was built by Mr Jack Silley on a new site at the top of the present garden. Mr Silley also developed the present garden on the site of the old mansion garden and his work was continued by Judge and Mrs Chope. One of the notable features of the garden is the large lily pond with swans.

It was added to Historic England's Heritage at Risk Register in 2018.
