= Treffry =

Cornish surname

Treffry is a Cornish surname. The first record of the name Treffry is found in Cornwall, where they lived at Treffry near Lanhydrock. A Roger Treffry was born about 1260 and his descendant John Treffry was living in 1658.

== History ==
In 1457 French marauders besieged the family's home at Place House in Fowey, to be repulsed by Elizabeth Treffry who gathered men together and allegedly poured melted lead, stripped from the roof, upon the invaders. Later, her husband Thomas Treffry is said to have built a tower to protect the building from further French attacks. A possible branch of the family lived at Rooke in the parish of St Kew.

== Joseph Austen Treffry ==
Joseph Thomas Austen's mother was born Susanna Ann Treffry and married Joseph Austen, hence Joseph Thomas Austen changed his name to Treffry when his father died. He became High Sheriff of Cornwall in 1838 and is known to have been one of the first mine owners to provide sick pay to his miners and medical attention to not only the miner but also his family. Their present family seat is still at Place. David Treffry of Place was High Sheriff of Cornwall in 1991.

== Variations ==
Many variations of the name Treffry are found in the archives: Trefry, Treffrey, Treffray, Trefrey, Trefry, Trefray, Trefary, Trevry, Trevney, Trevray, Trevers.

== Heraldry ==
The most ancient known grant of a coat of arms to this family was:

- Sable, a Chevron between three Trees Argent.

The crest was:

- A Cornish chough's head erased in the beak a sprig of laurel vert.

Other versions include:

- the tinctures "Tennée and Vert" for the trees
- sable a chevron between three trees erased (or "three hawthorns", or "three trefoils slipped") argent.
