= Boscawen (surname) =

Boscawen is a surname of Cornish origin, derived from Boscawen-Un. Notable people with the surname include:

- Arthur Boscawen (1862–1939), Cornish gardener, horticulturist and clergyman
- Charles Boscawen (1627–1689), English politician
- Edward Boscawen (1628–1685), English politician
- Edward Boscawen (1711–1761), British admiral, third son of Hugh Boscawen, 1st Viscount Falmouth
- Edward Boscawen, 1st Earl of Falmouth (1787–1841), British peer and politician
- Evelyn Boscawen, 6th Viscount Falmouth (1819–1889), horse breeder and classic race winner
- Evelyn Boscawen, 7th Viscount Falmouth (1847–1918), British army officer
- George Boscawen, 3rd Viscount Falmouth (1758–1808), British army officer and statesman
- George Boscawen, 2nd Earl of Falmouth (1811–1852), British peer and politician
- George Boscawen, 9th Viscount Falmouth (1919–2022), British peer
- Hugh Boscawen, 1st Viscount Falmouth (c. 1680–1734), British peer and politician
- Hugh Boscawen, 2nd Viscount Falmouth (1707–1782), British peer and politician
- Hugh Boscawen (1625–1701), British peer and politician
