= Molesworth-St Aubyn baronets =

Title in the Baronetage of England

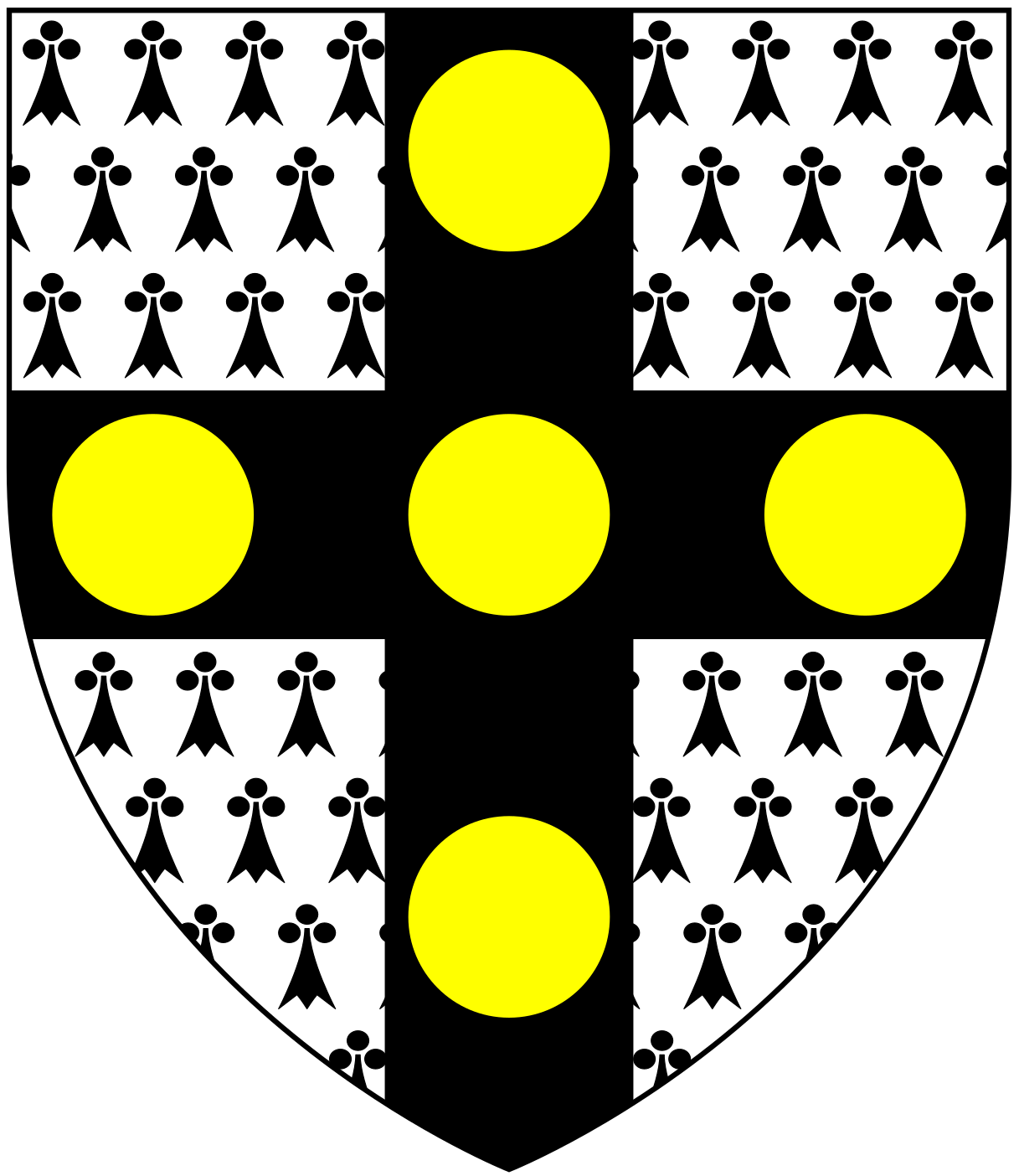
Arms of St Aubyn, as quartered by the Molesworth-St Aubyn Baronets of Pencarrow: Ermine, on a cross sable five bezants

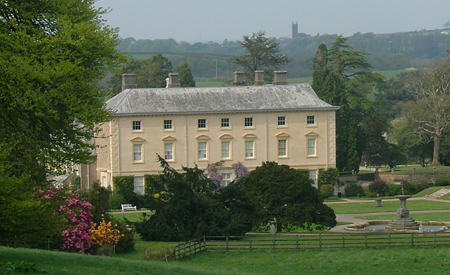
Pencarrow

The Molesworth, later Molesworth-St Aubyn Baronetcy, of Pencarrow near St Mabyn in Cornwall, is a title in the Baronetage of England. It was created on 19 July 1689 for Hender Molesworth, Governor of Jamaica. The second Baronet sat as Member of Parliament for Lostwithiel and Bossiney. The fourth Baronet represented Newport and Cornwall in the House of Commons. The fifth and sixth Baronets sat as Members of Parliament for Cornwall. The eighth Baronet was a prominent Radical politician and served as Secretary of State for the Colonies from July to October in 1855.

The eleventh Baronet, who had no children, represented Bodmin in Parliament as a Liberal Unionist. When he died, the baronetcy passed to his cousin, who was the son of the Reverend Hender Molesworth-St Aubyn. The twelfth Baronet was great-great-grandson of Sir John St Aubyn, 4th Baronet of the St Aubyn Baronetcy of Clowance, in the County of Cornwall; the Reverend Hender Molesworth had, in 1844, assumed by Royal licence the additional surname of St Aubyn, through his mother Catherine St Aubyn. Thus, Sir St Aubyn Hender Molesworth-St Aubyn, 12th Baronet, brought into being the adjusted name "Molesworth-St Aubyn" for the baronetcy, while also providing a link back to the extinct (since 1839) St Aubyn Baronetcy of Clowance. The fifteenth Baronet was High Sheriff of Cornwall from 1975 to 1976 and also served as a Deputy Lieutenant of the county.

== Molesworth, later Molesworth-St Aubyn baronets, of Pencarrow (1689) ==
- Sir Hender Molesworth, 1st Baronet (c. 1638–1689)
- Sir John Molesworth, 2nd Baronet (1635–1716)
- Sir John Molesworth, 3rd Baronet (1668–1723)
- Sir John Molesworth, 4th Baronet (1705–1766)
- Sir John Molesworth, 5th Baronet (1729–1775)
- Sir William Molesworth, 6th Baronet (1758–1798)
- Sir Arscott Ourry Molesworth, 7th Baronet (1789–1823)
- Sir William Molesworth, 8th Baronet (1810–1855)
- Sir Hugh Henry Molesworth, 9th Baronet (1818–1862)
- Sir Paul William Molesworth, 10th Baronet (1821–1889)
- Sir Lewis William Molesworth, 11th Baronet (1853–1912)
- Sir St Aubyn Hender Molesworth-St Aubyn, 12th Baronet (1833–1913)
- Sir Hugh Molesworth-St Aubyn, 13th Baronet (1865–1942)
- Sir John Molesworth-St Aubyn, 14th Baronet (1899–1985)
- Sir (John) Arscott Molesworth-St Aubyn, 15th Baronet (1926–1998)
- Sir William Molesworth-St Aubyn, 16th Baronet (born 1958)

The heir apparent to the baronetcy is Archie Hender Molesworth-St. Aubyn (born 1997), eldest son of the 16th Baronet.
