= Pencarrow =

Country house in Cornwall, England

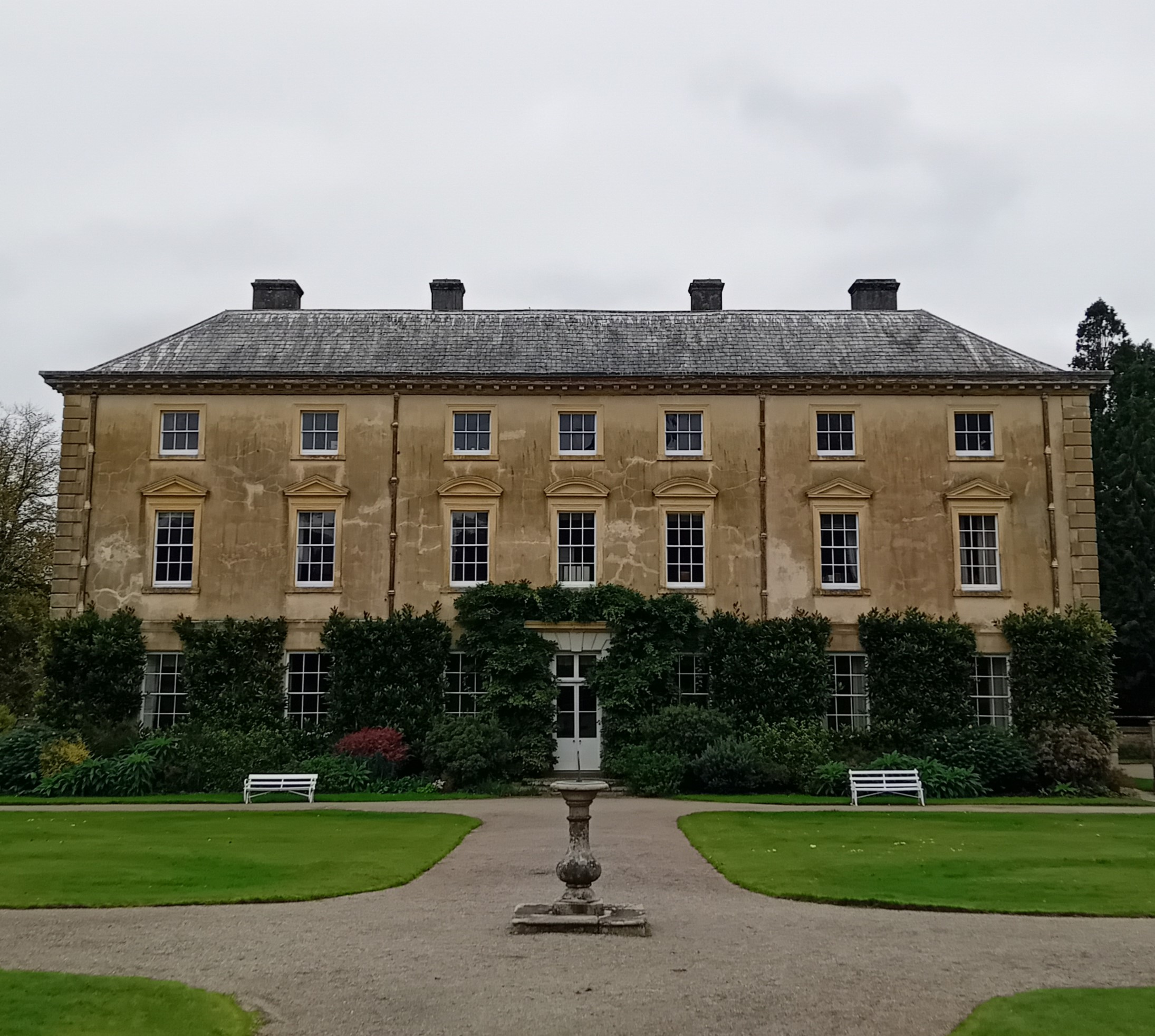
- Pencarrow House in 2024

- Location within Cornwall
- 50.505288°N 4.765751°W
- Location: Egloshayle, Cornwall, England

Listed Building – Grade II*
- Official name: Pencarrow House
- Designated: 4 November 1988
- Reference no.: 1311084

National Register of Historic Parks and Gardens
- Official name: Pencarrow
- Designated: 11 June 1987
- Reference no.: 1000652

Pencarrow is a Grade II*-listed country house in the civil parish of Egloshayle, in north Cornwall, England. It is situated three miles (5 km) east-southeast of Wadebridge and three miles (5 km) north-northwest of Bodmin.

== History ==
Sir John Molesworth, the fourth Molesworth baronet, started the construction of Pencarrow in the 1760s, extending a large older house on the site, and it was completed after his death in 1766, by his son, the fifth baronet, also Sir John Molesworth. The architect was probably Robert Allanson. The initial remodelling of the house may have begun around 1730, as the Palladian style of the house was somewhat out of fashion by the 1760s and 1770s when much of the work was done. Another clue is that the symmetry of the south and east façades is not matched by any symmetry in the interior plan, possibly because the layout of the building's rooms inhibited the axial symmetry associated with the Palladian style.

== Description ==
The oldest parts of the house probably date from the late 17th or early 18th century, although there was earlier building on the site. The south and east façades are stuccoed stone rubble and brick, while the north side is stone rubble. The west side is built of dressed slate stone with a moulded plinth. The roofs are slate with hipped ends on the south and east fronts.

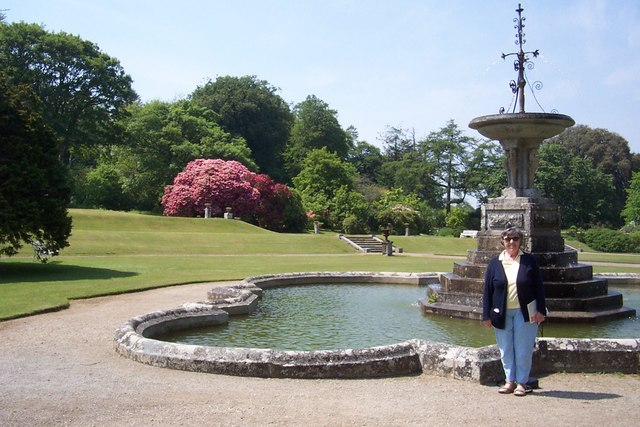
The gardens at Pencarrow

The surrounding woodlands and gardens, laid out by Sir William Molesworth, the 8th Baronet, between 1831 and 1835, now contain 160 species of specimen conifers, 700 species of rhododendrons and 60 species of camellias, and an Italian garden, a granite rockery and lake. Araucaria araucana derives its popular name of "monkey puzzle tree" from what happened when a young specimen of it at Pencarrow was shown to a group of friends of the owner; one of them made the remark "It would puzzle a monkey to climb that"; as the species had no existing popular name, first 'monkey puzzler', then 'monkey puzzle' stuck.

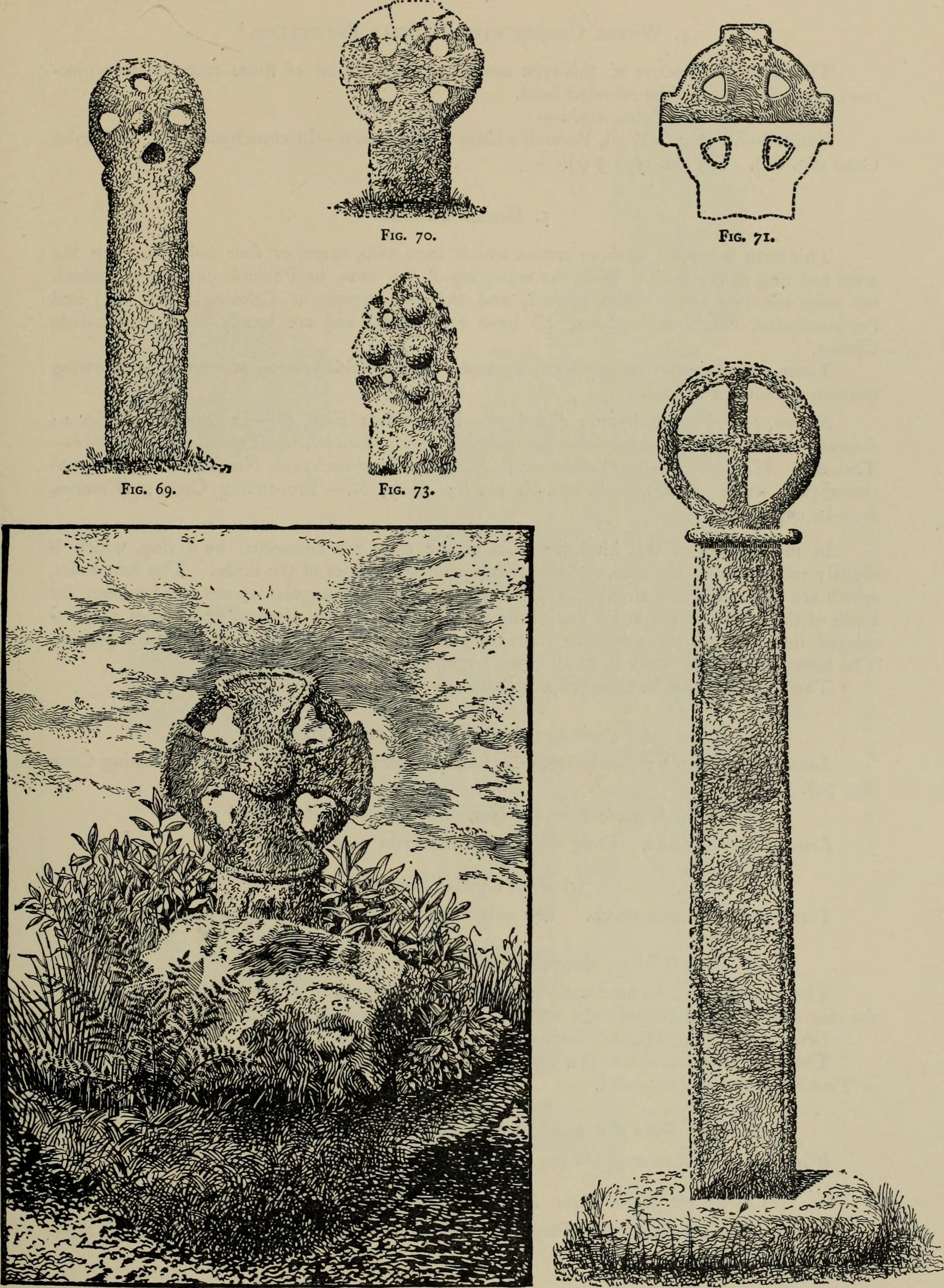
Some crosses in the Victoria History of the County of Cornwall; the one at bottom left is the Pencarrow cross head

== Stone cross head ==
A stone cross head at Pencarrow was described by Arthur Langdon (1896). It was found c. 1870 on the estate and afterwards set up in the grounds.

== Cornish wrestling ==
Cornish wrestling tournaments, for prizes, were held at Pencarrow in the 1800s.
