= McGill (surname) =

McGill, MacGill, Macgill and Magill are surnames of Irish and Scottish origin, an Anglicisation of Gaelic Mac an Ghoill meaning "son of the foreigner". In the 2000 United States census the surname was ranked the 1,218th most common.

== People ==
- Alexander McGill (disambiguation)
- Andrew Ryan McGill (1840–1905), American politician
- Anthony McGill (born 1991), Scottish professional snooker player
- Anthony McGill (musician) (born 1979), American clarinettist
- Arnold Robert McGill (1905–1988), Australian ornithologist
- Bill McGill (1939–2014), American basketball player
- Bob McGill (born 1962), Canadian ice hockey player
- Brendan McGill (born 1981), Irish footballer
- Bruce McGill (born 1950), American actor
- Charlie MacGill (1916–1999), Australian cricketer
- Charles McGill (1964–2017), American sculptor
- Charlie McGill (1903–1988), Scottish footballer
- Claire McGill, Irish politician
- David McGill (disambiguation)
- Demarre McGill (born 1975), American flutist
- Donald McGill (1875–1962), British author and postcard artist
- Eddie McGill (born 1960), American football player
- Elsie MacGill (1905–1980), Canadian aeronautical engineer and aircraft designer
- Eric McGill (born 1987), Irish footballer
- Eric McGill (basketball) (born 1996), American basketball player
- Everett McGill (born 1945), American actor
- Frances Gertrude McGill (1882–1959), pioneering Canadian forensic pathologist and criminologist
- George McGill (Kansas politician) (1879–1963), American politician
- George McGill (Arkansas politician), American politician
- George McGill (RCAF officer) (1918–1944), Royal Canadian Air Force officer
- Gillis MacGill (1928–2013), American fashion model and agent
- Helen Gregory MacGill (1864–1947), Canadian judge
- James MacGill (died 1579), Scottish politician
- James McGill (1744–1813), Scottish-born Canadian businessman and philanthropist
- Jill McGill (born 1972), American golfer
- Jimmy McGill (disambiguation)
- Jason McGill (born 1966), English football chairman
- John McGill (disambiguation)
- Josephine McGill (1877–1919), American composer and music historian
- Jubilee McGill, American politician from Vermont
- Karmeeleyah McGill (born 1971), American football player
- Laura McGill, American weapons engineer
- Liv McGill (born 2006), American basketball player
- Mike McGill (born 1964), American skateboarder
- Moyna Macgill (1895–1975), Irish actor
- Ollie McGill (born 1981), member of Australian band The Cat Empire
- Ormond McGill (1913–2005), American stage hypnotist, magician and instructor
- Patrick MacGill (1889–1963), Irish writer known as "The Navvy Poet"
- Paddy McGill (1913–1977), Irish politician and journalist
- Peter MacGill, American gallerist and curator
- Peter McGill (1789–1860), mayor of Montreal
- ((paul McGill)). Scottish doctor and author
- Ralph McGill (1898–1969), American journalist
- Rickey McGill (born 1997), American basketball player
- Roderick McGill (1888–1968), member of the Mississippi House of Representatives
- Rollee McGill (1931–2000), American R&B musician
- Ryan McGill (born 1969), Canadian ice hockey player
- Samuel Ford McGill (1815–1871), Liberian politician and physician
- Scott McGill (footballer) (born 2002), Scottish footballer
- Stuart MacGill (born 1971), Australian cricketer
- Tom McGill (born 2000), English footballer
- Terry MacGill (born 1945), Australian cricketer
- Urias McGill (c. 1823–1866), Liberian businessman
- William McGill (disambiguation)

== Fictional characters ==
- Chuck McGill, older brother of Jimmy McGill in Better Call Saul
- Lynn McGill, fictional character played by Sean Astin in the 5th season of the television drama series 24
- McGill, anti-hero of the 1960s series Man in a Suitcase, whose first name is never disclosed
- Stacey McGill, a character from The Baby-sitters Club book series
- Jimmy McGill, a character from series Breaking Bad and main protagonist in Better Call Saul
- Maggie M'Gill, a song by The Doors
- Tess McGill, lead character played by Melanie Griffith in the 1988 movie Working Girl
- Charles McGill Sr., father of Chuck McGill and Jimmy McGill, Better Call Saul
- Ruth McGill, mother of Chuck McGill and Jimmy McGill, Better Call Saul

== See also ==
- Magill (disambiguation)
- Magill (surname)
- MacGillivray
- McGillivray (disambiguation)
- MacGill-Eain (disambiguation)
