= McGillivray =

McGillivray may refer to:

== People ==
- McGillivray (surname)

== Places ==
- McGillivray Creek (British Columbia), a creek in the Lillooet Country of British Columbia
  - McGillivray, British Columbia (formerly McGillivray Falls) in the Lillooet Country of British Columbia
  - McGillivray Falls, a waterfall in the Lillooet Country of British Columbia
  - McGillivray Pass, a mountain pass in the Lillooet Country of British Columbia
- McGillivray Ridge, a ridge in the East Kootenay region of British Columbia
- Mount McGillivray, Alberta, a mountain in the Canadian Rockies

== Other ==
- MacGillivray
- McGill (disambiguation)
