= Charles Reed (British politician) =

British politician

Sir Charles Reed
- Sir Charles Reed MP
- Born: 19 June 1819
- Died: 25 March 1881 (aged 61)
- Occupation: Politician
- Spouse: Margaret Baines
- Children: 3

Sir Charles Reed FSA (19 June 1819 – 25 March 1881) was a British politician who served as Member of Parliament for Hackney and for St Ives, Chairman of the London School Board, Director and Trustee of the original Abney Park Cemetery Joint Stock Company, Chairman of the Bunhill Fields Preservation Committee, associate of George Peabody, lay Congregationalist, and owner of a successful commercial type-founding business in London. He was elected a Fellow of the Society of Antiquaries, and was knighted by the Queen at Windsor Castle in 1874. As a pastime he collected autograph letters and keys.

== Family ==
Charles Reed was the eldest son of the well-known Hackney philanthropist and Congregational Minister Dr Andrew Reed, founder of the London Orphan Asylum at Clapton and other notable charitable institutions, who had studied theology under the Rev. George Collison. He is commemorated at Abney Park Cemetery with a tall obelisk of polished red granite. His mother was Eliza, daughter of Jasper Holme of Castle Hall, Reading.

Charles Reed married Margaret Baines (youngest daughter of Edward Baines MP from Leeds, and sister to Sir Edward Baines the nonconformist politician and newspaper editor). They had four sons and four daughters.

1. Charles Edward Baines Reed (24 July 1845 – 29 July 1884) entered the Congregational ministry and served as secretary of the British and Foreign Bible Society. He met with an accidental death in the Engadine, Switzerland and was buried at Pontresina.
2. Andrew Holmes Reed (1848–1892) is commemorated with his brother Talbot at Abney Park Cemetery by an eye-catching Celtic cross executed by O'Shea in Kilkenny using sparkling grey Irish granite.
3. Talbot Baines Reed (3 April 1852 – 1893), was the author of highly rated story books for boys.
4. Kenneth Reed (died 8 July 1879), the youngest son drowned in a canoeing accident on Lake Allen, Ireland before the age of twenty.

== Schooling ==
Charles Reed was educated at Madras House, Mare Street, Hackney, which is said to have been the most distinguished 19th-century school in the enlightened tradition of Ainsworth. The school's name was the idea of religious writer John Allen (died 1839), who adopted the Madras system of schooling under which older pupils are appointed as "monitors" and take partial responsibility for supervising the younger boys. Allen began the school in 1817, moving to larger premises at 208 Mare Street in 1821.

== Business career ==
Reed's Business Premises at No 33 Aldersgate Street, London

Reed began the business side of his career in 1836 as an apprentice to a firm of woolen manufacturers at Leeds. In 1839, with his friend Thomas Edward Plint, he started and edited a magazine called The Leeds Repository, and on returning to London he co-founded the firm of Tyler & Reed, printers and typefounders in 1842. Reed changed business partners several times, becoming a partner in the famous Fann Street Foundry in Fann Street off Aldersgate Street in 1866 (which thereby became 'Reed & Fox'). The Fann Street business formed the basis for his own type-founding business Sir Charles Reed & Sons, whose office at 33 Aldersgate Street is illustrated.

The 'Reed' company name continued into the twentieth century long after Charles Reed's death, though under the proprietorship of Stephenson Blake & Co. who had bought Reed's business interests. At one time Reed's had been the larger of the two firms but it had difficulties in financing a modernisation programme as typography changed, and its once valuable equipment became out of date. Indeed, Stephenson Blake's acquisition was thought at the time to be very generous as it looked to be buying little other than the Reed's name and reputation. Not long after, however, thorough cataloguing of Reed's typefaces proved to be a treasure trove. Designs such as the Clarendon typeface, which Charles Reed had originally acquired from Robert Besley & Sons of the Fann Street foundry, became very marketable once re-cast using new technology. Several of Reed's typefaces are now available for use in font collections on our computers, such as Clarendon, which is now owned by a German company (as a trademark of Heidelberger Druckmaschinen AG licensed through Linotype Library GmbH, a wholly owned subsidiary of Heidelberger Druckmaschinen AG).

Charles' son Talbot Baines Reed (1852–1893), an author of books for boys, wrote the standard reference work on the history of typefounders in England, which went through may editions. It was said to be the most complete historical study in existence in any country before its editions were supplemented by new research in the 1950s.

== Lifeboat fund ==
There is a fund associated with the Broadstairs lifeboat and Sir Charles Reed. Founded in 1867, the Fund was originally established to help support seamen who risked their own lives to save others off the coast near Broadstairs. The following account is attributed by R. M. Ballantyne to Sir Charles Reed himself:

"Eight boatmen of Broadstairs [and their lugger—the Dreadnought] had for years done good service on the Goodwins. One night they went off in a tremendous sea to save a French barque; but though they secured the crew, a steam-tug claimed the prize and towed her into Ramsgate Harbour. The Broadstairs men instituted proceedings to secure the salvage, but they were beaten in a London law court, where they were overpowered by the advocacy of a powerful company. In the meantime they lost their lugger off the coast of Normandy, and in this emergency the lawyers they had employed demanded their costs. The poor men had no means, and not being able to pay they were taken from their homes and lodged in Maidstone Gaol. He (Sir Charles) was then staying in Broadstairs, and an appeal being made to him, he wrote to The Times, and in one week received nearly twice the amount required. The bill was paid, the men were liberated and brought home to their families, and the considerable balance... of the amount was invested, the interest to be applied to rewarding boatmen who, by personal bravery, had... saved life on the coast."

== London School Board ==
One of the early London School Board schools: Stoke Newington High Street 1877

In 1870 Reed was elected to the newly founded London School Board that was created following William Forster's Elementary Education Act of the same year which led to end of Ragged schools and other ad hoc charitable provision for the poor. The London School Board was the first directly elected body covering the whole of London, and a pioneer for its time in other respects too - women were entitled to vote for its board members and also to stand for election as politicians. Reed subsequently became vice-chairman and chairman. He died in office in 1881.

== Hackney's first MP ==
Two parliamentary seats were allotted to Hackney by the Representation of the People Act, 1867 and Charles Reed became, in 1868, the first MP to be elected to represent Hackney, along with John Holms. As a member of Britain's first Liberal government, he faced a vigorous opponent at the next election in April 1874, when Gladstone was defeated. The explorer Lieutenant William Gill stood against him for the Conservatives with support from the Independent newspaper, which dubbed the constituency notorious hitherto as a hotbed of Radicalism. The vigorous Conservative campaign increased its poll share from 10 per cent to 31 per cent, but Gill still came bottom of the poll. However, the ballot was called into question on procedural grounds, with the result that a new election had to be called three months later. Charles Reed's place was taken by Professor Fawcett for the Liberals. He chose Holms again as his running mate in the two-seat constituency and this time Gill lost by only a small margin. However, Liberals were always returned until the constituencies of North, Central, and South Hackney were created in 1885.

== Abney Park Cemetery ==
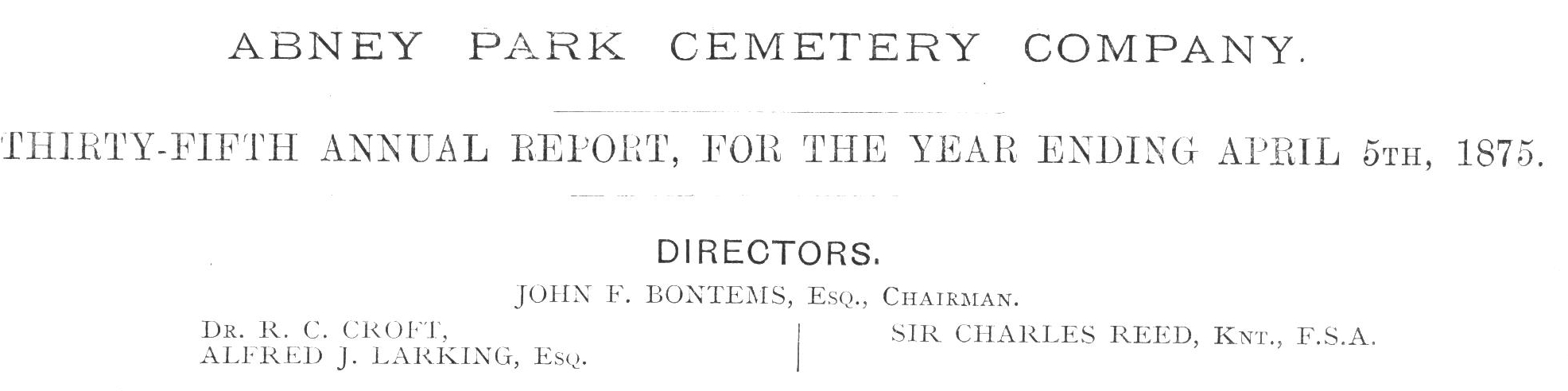
Abney Park Cemetery Company Annual Report for the year ending 5 April 1875

Reed had an interest in London's open spaces and their educational benefits, and became a subscriber to the Abney Park Cemetery, a joint stock company in whose trust lay parkland once owned by Lady Mary Abney, in which Dr Isaac Watts had written hymns. The associated members sought to maintain the site for its religious associations and for its value as open space. It was the only surviving example of a landscape designed by the nurseryman George Loddiges and boasted an arboretum of 2500 trees and shrubs. As the only New World cemetery design in Europe it had commissioned an entrance in an Egyptian revival style, to reflect its non-denominational character. The originality of the design and the motive force for acquiring and preserving the site had been George Collison, its first secretary, whose father had tutored Reed's father.

Reed, with a firm understanding of the historical importance of the landscape and its educational value, won election as a director of the company for 16 years between 1866 and 1881 and became a principal influence during its last decades as a joint stock company. Reed himself is buried there. Soon after Reed died, the cemetery was made over on 11 April 1882 to a new company run on commercial lines. This laid out a new cemetery, Chingford Mount Cemetery in 1883–1884. Others at Hendon Park and Greenford followed.

== Bunhill Fields ==
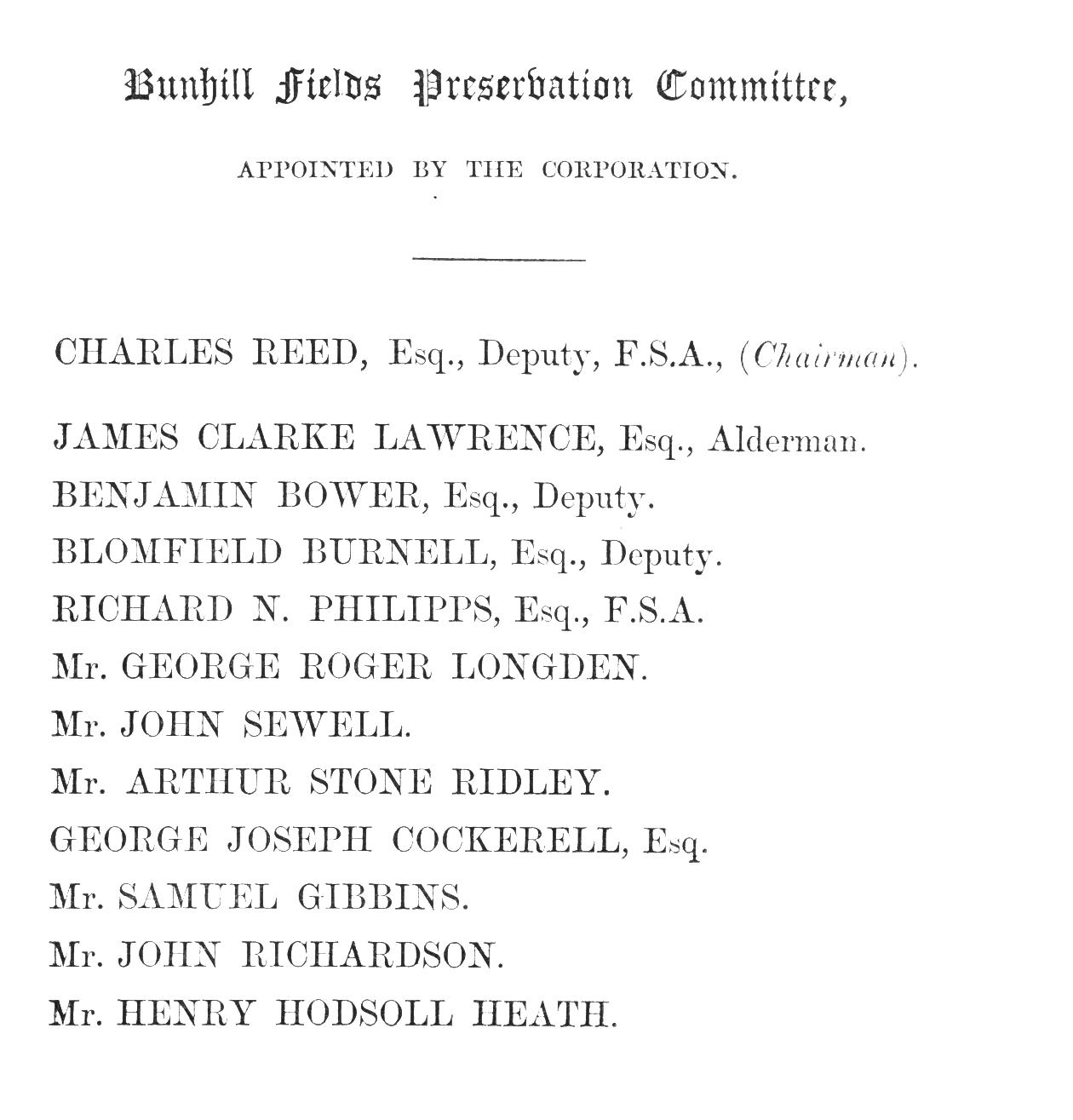
List of members of the Bunhill Fields Preservation Committee

The Bunhill Fields burial ground is an ancient open space. Until its closure in the mid–19th century, many historically important people (particularly those whose religious beliefs dissented from the Established Church), chose this as their place of quiet interment on the edge of the city.

The poet Robert Southey gave Bunhill Fields the memorable appellation the Campo Santo of the Dissenters; a phrase that also came to be applied to its "daughter" cemetery at Abney Park. This was a reference to its historical importance as a burial place for religious figures such as John Bunyan and Dr Isaac Watts.

Monument to John Bunyan paid for by public subscription on the preservation of Bunhill Fields Burial Ground as a public park

In a move to prevent the land from being built upon on expiry of a longstanding lease, the Corporation of the City of London formed a special Bunhill Fields Burial Ground Committee in 1865, which became formally known as the Bunhill Fields Preservation Committee. The committee, appointed by the corporation, consisted of twelve advisors under Reed's chairmanship. Following the work of the committee, the City of London Corporation obtained an Act of Parliament in 1867 for the Preservation of Bunhill Fields Burial Ground as a public open space with seating, gardens, and for the restoration of some of its worthiest monuments, including one to Daniel Defoe funded by The Christian World and unveiled by Reed. The new park was opened by the Lord Mayor on 14 October 1869.

== Other public activity ==
Reed was widely involved in other philanthropic circles. He was an associate of George Peabody, for whom Reed moved the motion of 10 July 1862 granting Freedom of the City of London. He also developed the Guildhall Library of the City of London, while he was a councillor. His longstanding interest in social and educational improvement in The City of London was also reflected in membership of the Court of Common Council and in membership of the board of the City of London School.

In the religious field he was active in the London Missionary Society, the British and Foreign Bible Society, the London Sunday School Union, and the Religious Tract Society. Returned to Parliament again in 1880 for St Ives in Cornwall, he voted against his party in the Bradlaugh debates, deploring Charles Bradlaugh's atheism.

== Death ==
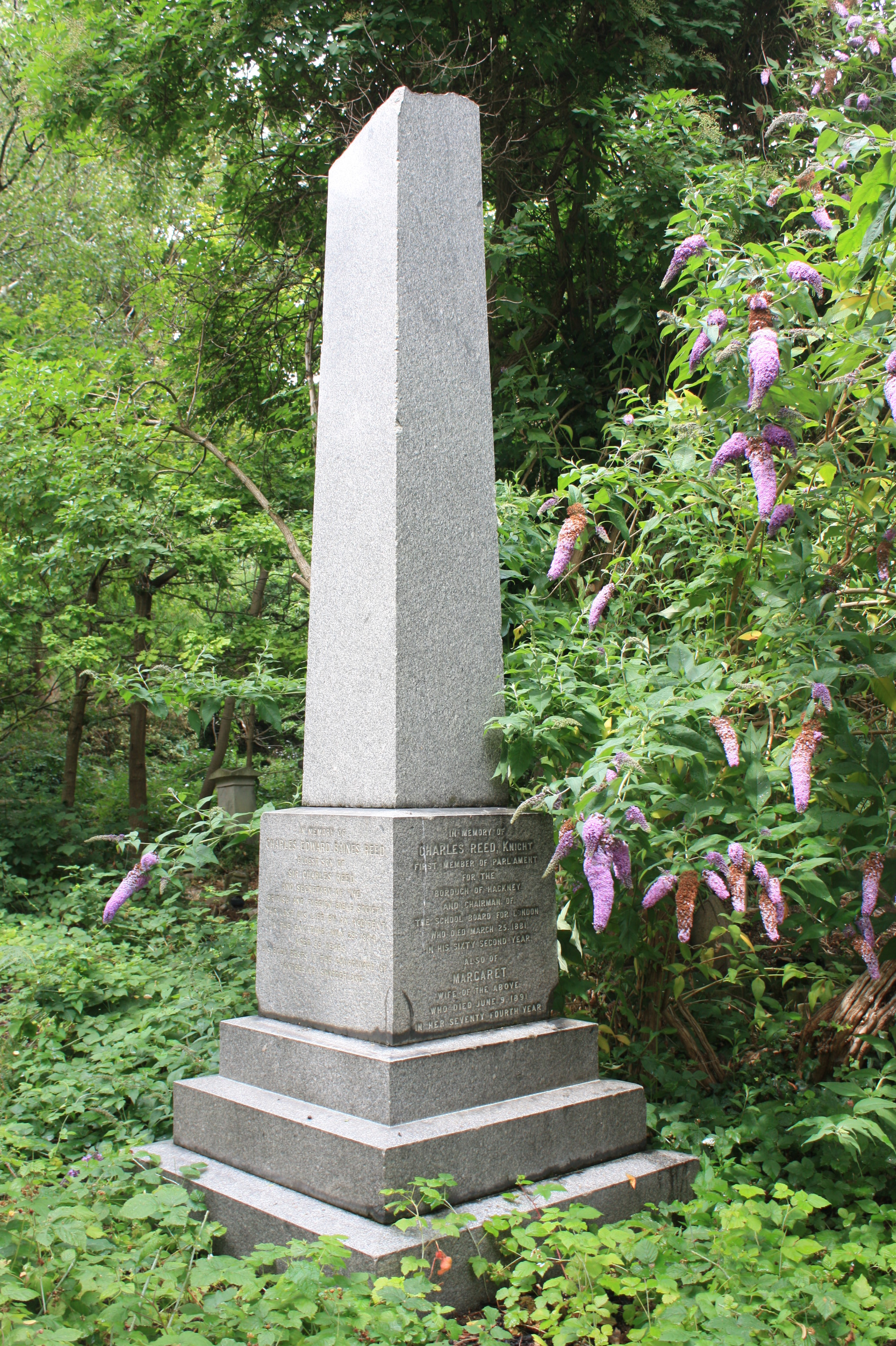
The grave of Charles Reed, Abney Park Cemetery, London

Reed died at Earlsmead, Page Green, Tottenham High Road, in London on 25 March 1881.

He is buried at Abney Park Cemetery near the Church Street (southern) entrance, in a grave marked by a grey granite obelisk. The top is missing from the obelisk. His wife, Margaret (1817–1891), and eldest son, Charles Edward Baines Reed (killed accidentally in 1884), lie with him. His second son, Andrew Holmes Reed, lies nearby to the south, beneath a large grey granite Celtic cross.

Parliament of the United Kingdom
New constituency	Member of Parliament for Hackney; 1868 – 1874; With: John Holms	Succeeded by John Holms; Henry Fawcett
Preceded by Charles Praed	Member of Parliament for St Ives; 1880 – 1881	Succeeded by Charles Campbell Ross
Government offices
Preceded by Lord Lawrence	Chairman of the London School Board; 1873–1881	Succeeded by Edward Buxton
