= Hackney by-election =

Hackney by-election may refer to:

- 1874 Hackney by-election
- 1880 Hackney by-election
- 1884 Hackney by-election
