= Member for India =

The Honourable Member for India was an informal title popularly applied to a Member of Parliament (MP) in the British House of Commons who were known for taking a particular personal interest in social or political conditions in British India or for personal sympathy towards the Indian independence movement. The historian Nicholas Owen describes it as a "tradition" for those who "wished to take the moral lead in demolishing or transforming empire".

The term implies that the MP considered India to be their constituency even though, as a colonial territory, it was not in fact represented in Parliament.

Members of Parliament popularly known as the "Member for India" included John Bright, Henry Fawcett, Charles Bradlaugh, Josiah Wedgwood, and Fenner Brockway. It was generally considered to be a compliment by those it was applied to.
