= Jack McGill =

Jack McGill may refer to:

- Jack McGill (ice hockey b. 1909) (1909–1988), ice hockey player
- Jack McGill (ice hockey b. 1921) (1921–1994), ice hockey player
- Jack McGill (Canadian football) (born c. 1927), Canadian football player

== See also ==
- John McGill (disambiguation)
