= Magrill =

Magrill is a surname. Notable people with the surname include:

- George Magrill (1900–1952), American actor
- Rose Marie Magrill (1924–2016), American model

== See also ==
- Magill (surname)
