= Norman S. Millar =

Australian Presbyterian minister

Norman Stuart Millar (22 December 1887 – 24 October 1938) was a Presbyterian minister in Brisbane, Australia. He was known as a brilliant speaker, courageous and forceful defender in argument, a thoughtful problem solver, and a ready wit.

== History ==
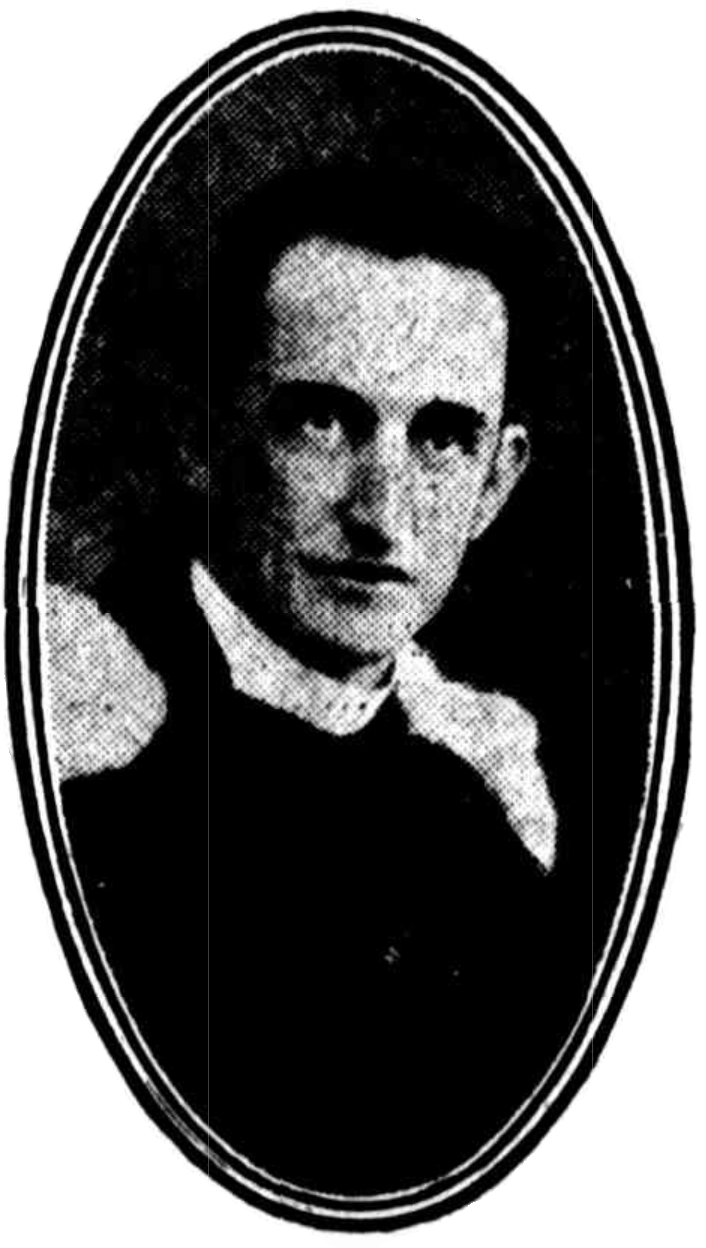
Millar in 1926

Millar was born in Patterson, near Newcastle, New South Wales, a son of Isabella Ann Millar, née McPherson, and James Cameron Millar (c. 1842 – 20 October 1904), who moved with his family to Clarence Town, and became well known as captain of the vessels Favourite and Edith on the Williams River, and where Millar attended the local schools. Coerwull Academy, in the Blue Mountains, and where A. D. McGill was once a teacher, has also been mentioned.

Millar once considered following his father as a shipowner and captain, but chose religion instead. He took the Master of Arts degree at St Andrew's College, University of Sydney and its associated Hall of Theology, which was interrupted by war service. He was ordained after a year at the Presbyterian church at Ryde and inducted into the Presbyterian church at Harden-Murrumburrah, became clerk of the church at Young, then chairman of the Presbyterian Ladies' College, Goulburn. He was convener of the Theological Hall Committee and the Public Morals Committee.

He was inducted to St Andrew's Presbyterian Church, Brisbane on 25 September 1924.

On 22 June 1933 he was appointed chaplain, 4th class, with the Australian Army. (During the First World War he served for three years with the YMCA in Egypt, Palestine and France.)

He was 14 years as minister of St Andrew's Church, and for much of that time an active member of the Council of Churches in Queensland, seven as president. He was elected Moderator in 1936, but the illness that took his life prevented him taking office.

He died aged 50 after two years of debilitating illness, but continued working to the end. A marble plaque on the church building, corner Creek and Ann streets, Brisbane, is a tribute to his ministry.

A memoir, published by his wife, sold out immediately.

== Family ==
He married Mary Wallace BA (died 18 May 1979), of Haberfield, New South Wales on 1 May 1920. Mary was a fellow-student at the University, and for a time History mistress at North Sydney Girls' High School; they had several children.
