= Magill (disambiguation) =

Magill was an Irish politics and current affairs magazine.

It may also refer to:

- Magill (surname) (including a list of people with the name)
- Magill, South Australia, suburb of Adelaide, South Australia
- Magill Cottage, historic cure cottage in Franklin County, New York, US
- Magill House, historic house in DeWitt County, Illinois, US

== See also ==
- Magill forceps, intubation forceps
- Magill's History of Europe, a 1993 book
- Porter v Magill [2001], a UK administrative law case
- McGill (disambiguation)
