= C. H. Moore House =

Historic house in Illinois, United States

- CH Moore Homestead DeWitt County Museum
- U.S. National Register of Historic Places
- Location within Illinois Location within the United States
- Location: 219 E. Woodlawn St., Clinton, Illinois
- Coordinates: 40°9′8″N 88°57′33″W
- Area: 10 acres (4.0 ha)
- Architectural style: Second Empire, Italianate
- NRHP reference No.: 79003112
- Added to NRHP: March 23, 1979

The C. H. Moore Homestead, in Clinton, Illinois, is one of two Registered Historic Places in DeWitt County. The other, the Magill House, was added to the Register in 2003. CH Moore Homestead DeWitt County Museum was added in 1979.

== History ==
The house now known as the "C.H. Moore Homestead DeWitt County Museum" was originally owned and occupied by John Bishop and his wife, Minerva, who was a sister of C.H. Moore. Construction was started on the house in the 1870's. Mr. Bishop was a prosperous grain and lumber dealer in Clinton. Soon after Minerva Bishop's death in 1880, Mr. Bishop sold the house to his brother-in-law, Clifton H. Moore.

Moore, an educated man, was the first resident attorney to commence practice in Clinton, having hung out his shingle in 1841. He served as co-counsel with Abraham Lincoln on several cases heard in the DeWitt County circuit court, of which future United States Supreme Court justice David Davis was the presiding judge.

The west wing of the home was added in 1887 to house Mr. Moore's vast collection of books. At the time of his death in 1901, he owned approximately 5,000 volumes. At one point in time, it was reported that Moore had the largest private library in the state of Illinois with the exclusion of Chicago. The two-story high library has a vaulted ceiling and stenciled walls. There are four-season windows on the upper level, and an iron railing around the suspended upper gallery. The furniture and paintings include many of the original Moore furnishings. Moore's book collection was left to the city of Clinton upon his death and is now housed at the Vespasian Warner Public Library. The C.H. Moore Homestead DeWitt County Museum is situated on 10 acres and the house, grounds, covered bridge, and outbuildings (including the 1860's carriage barn, springhouse, and three large structures which house farm implements, railroad items, a telephone exhibit, carriages, buggies, antique cars, and more) are open for tours April through December, Tuesdays-Sundays.

    The house sat in disrepair for several decades until 1967 when it was purchased and restored by the newly formed DeWitt County Museum Association.
     The Apple 'N Pork festival, held annually the last full weekend in September and established by the DeWitt County Museum Association, was first held in 1967 to help raise funds to restore and maintain the mansion.

== C.H. Moore Homestead Dewitt County Museum ==
The C. H. Moore Homestead DeWitt County Museum is the centerpiece of the Apple 'n Pork Festival. This festival is held annually on the last weekend of September and has become one of central Illinois' largest festivals. The C.H. Moore Homestead DeWitt County Museum includes the restored Victorian mansion, special exhibits, the Kent Collection, original carriage barn, gardens, replica of an Indiana-style covered bridge, operable blacksmith shop, three barns filled with antique farm equipment, tools, buggies, sleighs, autos, railroad items, and working telephone display.
