= Magill (surname) =

Magill (Irish: Mag an Ghaill) is an Irish surname. Notable people with the name include:

- Alan Magill (1953–2015), Director of Malaria Programs at the Bill & Melinda Gates Foundation
- Alfred Magill Randolph (1836–1918), U.S. Episcopal bishop
- Anne Magill, British artist and illustrator
- Archibald Magill Fauntleroy (1837–1886), U.S. physician
- Charles Magill (1816–1898), member of the first Canadian Parliament and mayor of Hamilton
- Charles Magill Conrad (1804–1878), U.S. politician
- Charles Magill (Virginia judge) (1759–1827), U.S. lawyer, politician, and judge
- Dan Magill (1921–2014), sports director at the University of Georgia, U.S.
- Eddie Magill (born 1939), Northern Irish footballer
- Elizabeth Magill (born 1959), Irish painter
- Frank Magill (footballer) (1896–1969), Australian rules footballer
- Frank J. Magill (1927–2013), U.S. judge
- Franz Magill (1900–1972), SS war criminal
- Helen Magill White (1853–1944), first woman in the U.S. to earn a Ph.D.
- Ivan Magill (1888–1986), Irish-born anaesthetist
- Jimmy Magill (boxer) (1894–1942), Northern Irish amateur boxer
- Juliette Augusta Magill Kinzie (1806–1870), U.S. historian, writer and pioneer
- Juliette Magill Kinzie Low (1860–1927), U.S. founder of Girl Scouts of the USA
- Liz Magill, American university administrator
- Louis J. Magill (1871–1921), U.S. Marines officer during the Spanish–American War
- Luke Magill (born 1987), English footballer
- Margaret Magill (1888–1962), New Zealand educator
- Matt Magill (born 1989), U.S. professional baseball player
- Mike Magill (1920–2006), U.S. racecar driver
- Ron Magill (born 1960), U.S. photographer and wildlife expert
- Ronald Magill (1920–2007), English actor
- Ronan Magill (born 1954), British concert pianist and composer
- Roswell Magill (1895–1963), U.S. tax lawyer and official of the Department of Treasury
- Sam Magill (born 1945), Australian rules footballer
- Samuel Magill, mayor of Cumberland, Maryland, from 1823 to 1824
- Santiago Magill (born 1977), Peruvian actor
- Shawn Magill, member of the Canadian band Grade
- Simone Magill (born 1994), Northern Irish football player
- Theodosia Hawkins-Magill (1743–1817), Irish heiress and landowner

== See also ==
- Magill (disambiguation)
- McGill (disambiguation)
- Magill baronets
