= William McGill =

William McGill is the name of:

- William McGill (politician) (1814–1883), Scottish member of the Ontario Provincial Parliament
- William J. McGill (1922–1997), American psychologist and university administrator
- Willie McGill (1873–1944), American major league baseball pitcher
- Bill McGill (1939–2014), basketball player
- Bill McGill (baseball) (1880–1959), American baseball pitcher in Major League Baseball

== See also ==
- William Gill (disambiguation)
- McGill (surname)
