= Alexander McGill =

Alexander McGill may refer to:

- Alexander Douglas McGill (1886–1952), lawyer in Brisbane, Australia
- Alexander McGill (architect) (died 1734), Scottish mason and architect
- Alexander T. McGill (1843–1900), New Jersey jurist and politician
- Alex McGill from AFL Queensland
- Brigadier General Edward McGill Alexander, South African Military Officer
