= List of heads of London government =

This is a list of the various heads of local government organisations that have served London, England.

== Summary of London-wide heads of government ==
The Metropolitan Board of Works, created in 1855, was the first elected authority covering the whole metropolis of London, including the suburbs outside the ancient boundaries of the City of London. The area of the Metropolitan Board of Works became the County of London in 1889, which was enlarged to become the county of Greater London in 1965. The leaders of these bodies were:

| From | To | Name | Party | Role |
|---|---|---|---|---|
| 22 Dec 1855 | 8 Aug 1870 | John Thwaites | | Chairman of Metropolitan Board of Works |
| 18 Nov 1870 | 20 Mar 1889 | James McGarel-Hogg | | Chairman of Metropolitan Board of Works |
| 21 Mar 1889 | 27 Mar 1890 | Thomas Farrer | Progressive | Leader of London County Council |
| 27 Mar 1890 | 9 Mar 1892 | James Stuart | Progressive | Leader of London County Council |
| 9 Mar 1892 | 10 Mar 1898 | Charles Harrison | Progressive | Leader of London County Council |
| 10 Mar 1898 | 8 Mar 1907 | Thomas McKinnon Wood | Progressive | Leader of London County Council |
| 8 Mar 1907 | 11 Mar 1908 | Richard Robinson | Municipal Reform | Leader of London County Council |
| 11 Mar 1908 | 8 Mar 1910 | William Wellesley Peel | Municipal Reform | Leader of London County Council |
| 8 Mar 1910 | 19 Dec 1911 | William Hayes Fisher | Municipal Reform | Leader of London County Council |
| 19 Dec 1911 | 16 Mar 1915 | Cyril Jackson | Municipal Reform | Leader of London County Council |
| 16 Mar 1915 | 1 Mar 1918 | Ronald Collet Norman | Municipal Reform | Leader of London County Council |
| 1 Mar 1918 | 11 Mar 1925 | George Hume | Municipal Reform | Leader of London County Council |
| 11 Mar 1925 | 9 Mar 1934 | William Ray | Municipal Reform | Leader of London County Council |
| 9 Mar 1934 | 27 May 1940 | Herbert Morrison | Labour | Leader of London County Council |
| 27 May 1940 | 29 Jul 1947 | Charles Latham | Labour | Leader of London County Council |
| 29 Jul 1947 | 31 Mar 1965 | Isaac Hayward | Labour | Leader of London County Council |
| 1 Apr 1965 | 14 Apr 1967 | Bill Fiske | Labour | Leader of Greater London Council |
| 14 Apr 1967 | 13 Apr 1973 | Desmond Plummer | Conservative | Leader of Greater London Council |
| 13 Apr 1973 | 6 May 1977 | Reg Goodwin | Labour | Leader of Greater London Council |
| 6 May 1977 | 8 May 1981 | Horace Cutler | Conservative | Leader of Greater London Council |
| 8 May 1981 | 2 Aug 1984 | Ken Livingstone | Labour | Leader of Greater London Council |
| 2 Aug 1984 | 21 Sep 1984 | John Wilson | Labour | Leader of Greater London Council |
| 21 Sep 1984 | 31 Mar 1986 | Ken Livingstone | Labour | Leader of Greater London Council |
| 1 Apr 1986 | 3 May 2000 | No London-wide elected authority | | |
| 4 May 2000 | Dec 2003 | Ken Livingstone | Independent | Mayor of London |
| Dec 2003 | 3 May 2008 | Ken Livingstone | Labour | Mayor of London |
| 4 May 2008 | 8 May 2016 | Boris Johnson | Conservative | Mayor of London |
| 9 May 2016 | Incumbent | Sadiq Khan | Labour | Mayor of London |

== City of London ==
=== Lord Mayor of London ===
The Lord Mayor of the City of London is an ancient office and is the chief position of the Corporation of London.

- List of Lord Mayors of London

== The Metropolis ==
=== Chairmen of the Metropolitan Commission of Sewers ===
The Metropolitan Commission of Sewers was an ad hoc body formed in 1849 to bring London's sewerage and drainage under the control of a single public body. In 1856 it was abolished with its powers passing to the Metropolitan Board of Works.

- Viscount Ebrington (1 January 1849 – 6 October 1851)
- Edward Lawes (6 October 1851 – 24 July 1852)
- Richard Jebb (24 July 1852 – 1 January 1856)

=== Chairmen of the Metropolitan Board of works ===
The Metropolitan Board of Works was a general purpose authority for the metropolitan area of London from 1855 to 1889.

- Sir John Thwaites (22 December 1855 – 8 August 1870) (died in office)
- James Macnaghten Hogg (18 November 1870 – 21 March 1889)

=== Chairmen of the London School Board ===
The London School Board was an ad hoc authority. The functions were eventually absorbed by the London County Council.

- Lord Lawrence (15 December 1870 – 10 December 1873)
- Sir Charles Reed (10 December 1873 – 25 March 1881) (Died in office)
- Edward North Buxton (5 April 1881 – 3 December 1885)
- Rev. Joseph Diggle (3 December 1885 – 6 December 1894)
- Lord George Hamilton (6 December 1894 – 3 October 1895)
- Marquess of Londonderry (31 October 1895 – 2 December 1897)
- Lord Reay (2 December 1897 – 30 April 1904)

=== Chairmen of the Metropolitan Asylums Board ===
The Metropolitan Asylums Board was an ad hoc authority. The functions were eventually absorbed by the London County Council.

- Dr. William Brewer (22 June 1867 – 3 November 1881) (died in office)
- Sir Edwin Galsworthy (26 November 1881 – 18 May 1901)
- Sir Robert Hensley (18 May 1901 – 19 May 1904)
- Sir Augustus Scovell (19 May 1904 – 25 May 1907)
- J. T. Helby (25 May 1907 – 28 May 1910)
- Walter Dennis (28 May 1910 – 31 May 1913)
- Sir Robert Woolley Walden (31 May 1913 – 24 May 1919)
- Very Rev. Canon Norman Sprankling (24 May 1919 – 20 May 1922)
- Walter Eickhoff (20 May 1922 – 24 July 1924) (died in office)
- Sir Francis Morris (31 July 1924 – 19 May 1928)
- Viscount Doneraile (19 May 1928 – 1 April 1930)

== County of London ==
The London County Council was a county council covering the County of London.

=== Chairmen of the London County Council ===
The chairmanship and vice chairmanship of the London County Council were statutory offices created in 1889 and abolished in 1965. The positions were largely ceremonial, similar to the office of mayor in a borough. The council's standing orders also provided for the post of deputy chairman. Each of these offices were held for a one-year term of office.

=== Leaders of the London County Council ===
The post of Leader was only officially recognised in 1933. This table gives the Leaders of the majority parties on the council before this time, although in the first term this had little relevance in terms of the leadership of the council.

- Sir Thomas Farrer (21 March 1889 – 27 March 1890)
- James Stuart (27 March 1890 – 9 March 1892)
- Charles Harrison (9 March 1892 – 10 March 1898)
- Thomas McKinnon Wood (10 March 1898 – 8 March 1907)
- Richard Robinson (8 March 1907 – 11 March 1908)
- Hon. William Wellesley Peel (11 March 1908 – 8 March 1910)
- William Hayes Fisher (8 March 1910 – 19 December 1911)
- Cyril Jackson (19 December 1911 – 16 March 1915)
- Ronald Collet Norman (16 March 1915 – 1 March 1918)
- Sir George Hume (1 March 1918 – 11 March 1925)
- Sir William Ray (11 March 1925 – 9 March 1934)
- Herbert Morrison (9 March 1934 – 27 May 1940)
- Lord Latham (27 May 1940 – 29 July 1947)
- Sir Isaac Hayward (29 July 1947 – 31 March 1965)

== Greater London ==
=== Leaders of the Greater London Council ===
The Greater London Council was the county council for Greater London from 1965 to 1986.

- Bill Fiske (11 April 1964 – 14 April 1967)
- Desmond Plummer (14 April 1967 – 13 April 1973)
- Sir Reg Goodwin (13 April 1973 – 6 May 1977)
- Sir Horace Cutler (6 May 1977 – 8 May 1981)
- Ken Livingstone (8 May 1981 – 2 August 1984)
- John Wilson (2 August 1984 – 21 September 1984)
- Ken Livingstone (21 September 1984 – 31 March 1986)

=== Leaders of the Inner London Education Authority ===
Although Inner London Education Authority was created in 1964 and came into its powers in 1965, the post of Leader did not exist until April 1967. For the period 1964–67 the de facto Leadership was shared between the Chairman of the Education Committee, James Young, and the Chairmen of the Authority, Harold Shearman (from 1964 to 1965) and Ashley Bramall (1965–1967).

- Christopher Chataway (19 April 1967 – 20 March 1969)
- Lena Townsend (20 March 1969 – 10 April 1970)
- Ashley Bramall (10 April 1970 – 8 May 1981)
- Bryn Davies (8 May 1981 – 19 April 1983)
- Frances Morrell (19 April 1983 – 5 May 1987)
- Neil Fletcher (5 May 1987 – 31 March 1990)

=== Chairman of the London Residuary Body ===
The London Residuary Body was responsible for disposing of the assets of the Greater London Council.

- Sir Godfrey 'Tag' Taylor (26 July 1985 – 30 June 1996)

=== Mayor of London ===
The Mayor of London is the executive of the Greater London Authority. The role has existed since 2000.

- Ken Livingstone (4 May 2000 – 3 May 2008)
- Boris Johnson (4 May 2008 – 8 May 2016)
- Sadiq Khan (9 May 2016 –)

=== Timeline for leaders of London-wide government ===
Timeline
