= Hackney (constituency) =

Parliamentary constituency in the United Kingdom, 1868–1885

- Former borough constituency for the House of Commons

1868–1885
- Seats: two
- Created from: Tower Hamlets (former north part of)
- Replaced by: Bethnal Green North East, Bethnal Green South West, Hackney North, Hackney Central, Hackney South, Hoxton and Shoreditch Haggerston

Hackney was a two-seat constituency in the House of Commons of the UK Parliament created under the Representation of the People Act 1867 (often termed Second Reform Act) from the former northern parishes of the Tower Hamlets constituency and abolished under the Redistribution of Seats Act 1885 (often termed a twin Third Reform Act, with its enabling Reform Act 1884).

The constituency existed in its two-seat form for three general elections and returned two Liberal Party Members at each election until its abolition. At abolition it was noted intense house- and apartment (tenement block-) building had occurred within its boundaries and it was divided into seven single seats.

== Boundaries ==
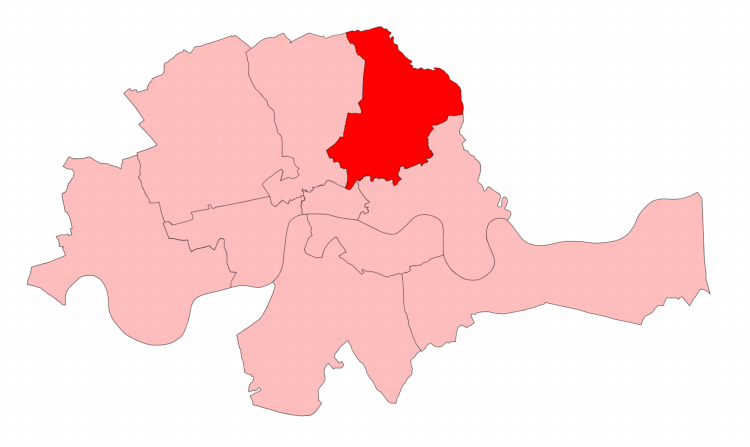
Hackney in the Metropolitan area from 1868 to 1885.

The vestry of the civil parish of Hackney became a local government authority in 1855.

The parliamentary borough of Hackney was established in 1868 and its area formed part of the east of the historic county of Middlesex. It comprised:

Parishes included	Population in 1871	Population in 1881	Total electorate 7 Dec 1868	Total electorate of 20 Nov 1884
The Parish of St Leonard, Shoreditch	not known	not known	40,613	48,076
The Parish of St Matthew, Bethnal Green	non known	not known	40,613	48,076
The Parish of St John, Hackney	115,110	163,681	40,613	48,076

The area thus formed the northern rump of Shoreditch and rest of the north of the former parliamentary borough of Tower Hamlets (Hackney accounted for the northernmost of the Hamlets in the nineteenth century, see Tower Division). The area was to the east of Islington and Hornsey, south of Tottenham in its county and west of Walthamstow in Essex.

In 1885 the two-member constituency was abolished. In 1889 the former area, for administrative purposes, became part of the London County Council local authority. In 1900 the main civil vestry was dissolved and the Metropolitan Borough of Hackney was created (with the same boundaries as the Parliamentary Borough). Since 1965 it has been part of Greater London.

== Members of Parliament ==
Sir Charles Reed MP

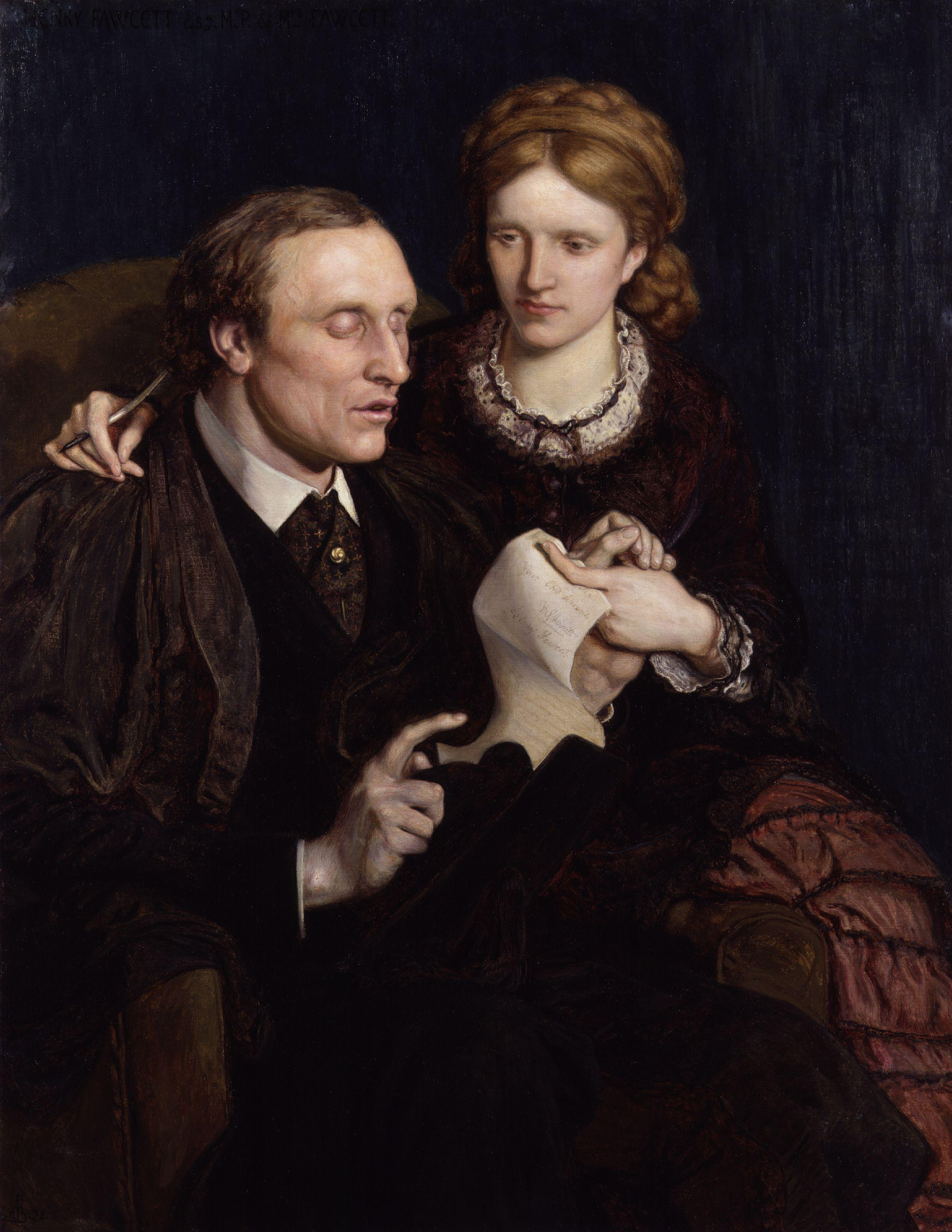
Henry Fawcett and Millicent Garrett Fawcett by Ford Madox Brown, 1872, National Portrait Gallery, London

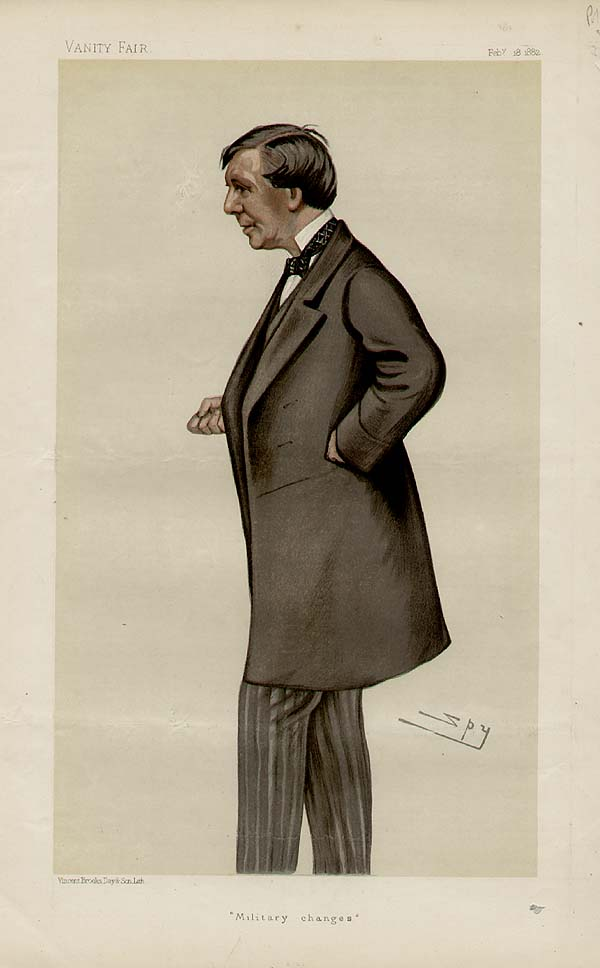
"Military changes" Holms as caricatured by Spy (Leslie Ward) in Vanity Fair, February 1882

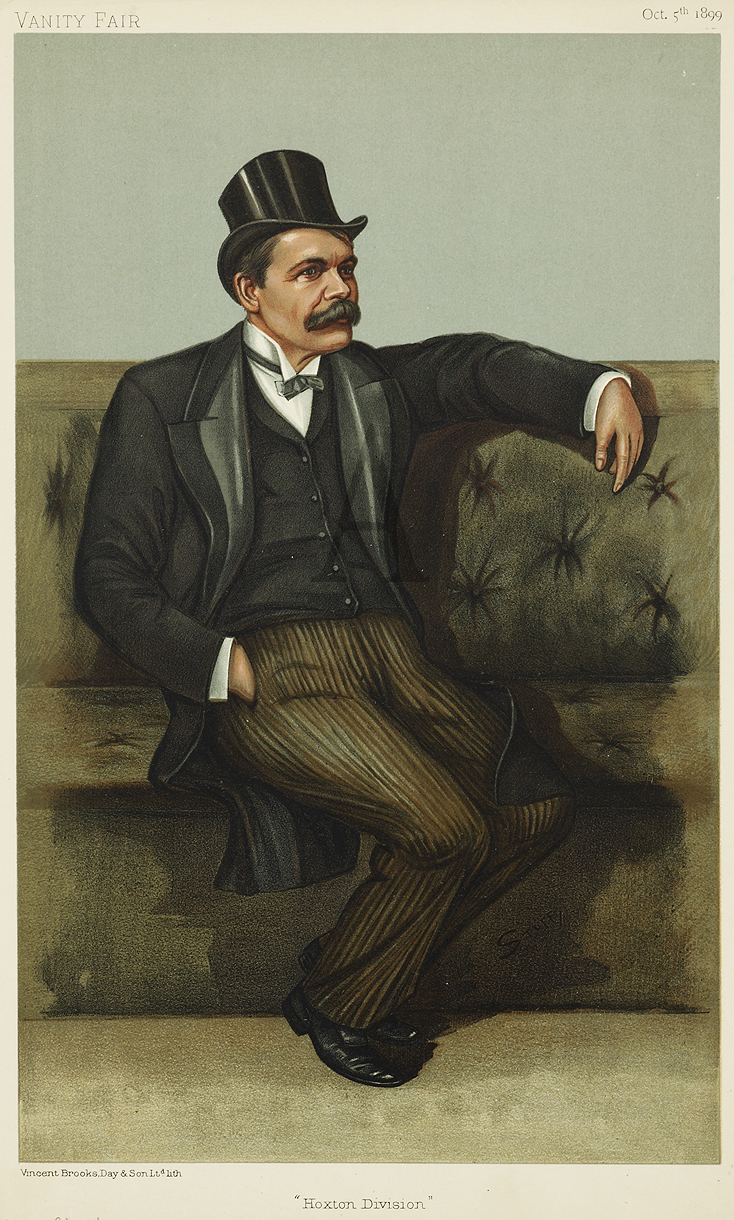
"Hoxton Division" Stuart as caricatured by "Stuff" in Vanity Fair, October 1899

Election	First member	First party	Second member	Second party
1868	Sir Charles Reed	Liberal	John Holms	Liberal
1874 by-election	Henry Fawcett	Liberal	John Holms	
1884 by-election	James Stuart	Liberal	John Holms	
1885	Constituency abolished. See Hackney North, Hackney Central and Hackney South			

== Elections ==
Turnout, in multi-member elections, is estimated by dividing the number of votes by two. To the extent that electors did not use both their votes, the figure given will be an underestimate.

Change is calculated for individual candidates, when a party had more than one candidate in an election or the previous one. When a party had only one candidate in an election and the previous one change is calculated for the party vote.

=== Elections in the 1860s ===
General election 1868: Hackney (2 seats)
Party	Candidate	Votes	%
Liberal	Charles Reed	14,785	36.0
Liberal	John Holms	12,243	29.8
Liberal	Charles Salisbury Butler	6,825	16.6
Conservative	Charles Locock Webb	2,633	6.4
Liberal	Lothian Sheffield Dickson	2,575	6.3
Liberal	John James Homer	2,021	4.9
Majority		5,418	13.2
Turnout		21,858 (est)	53.8 (est)
Registered electors		40,613	
Liberal win (new seat)			
Liberal win (new seat)			

=== Elections in the 1870s ===
General election 1874: Hackney (2 seats)
Party	Candidate	Votes	%	±%
Liberal	John Holms	6,968	34.5	+4.7
Liberal	Charles Reed	6,893	34.2	−1.8
Conservative	William Gill	6,310	31.3	+24.9
Majority		583	2.9	−10.3
Turnout		13,241 (est)	32.4 (est)	−21.4
Registered electors		40,870		
Liberal hold		Swing	−3.9	
Liberal hold		Swing	−8.1	

- Election declared void on petition

By-election, 25 April 1874: Hackney (2 seats)
Party	Candidate	Votes	%	±%
Liberal	John Holms	10,905	35.9	+1.4
Liberal	Henry Fawcett	10,476	34.5	+0.3
Conservative	William Gill	8,994	29.6	−1.7
Majority		1,482	4.9	+2.0
Turnout		19,685 (est)	48.2 (est)	+15.8
Registered electors		40,870		
Liberal hold		Swing	+1.1	
Liberal hold		Swing	+0.6	

=== Elections in the 1880s ===
General election 1880: Hackney (2 seats)
Party	Candidate	Votes	%	±%
Liberal	Henry Fawcett	18,366	40.2	+6.0
Liberal	John Holms	16,997	37.2	+2.7
Conservative	George Trout Bartley	10,332	22.6	−8.7
Majority		6,675	14.6	+11.7
Turnout		28,688 (est)	65.5 (est)	+33.1
Registered electors		43,773		
Liberal hold		Swing	+5.2	
Liberal hold		Swing	+3.5	

The appointment of Fawcett as Postmaster General and Holms as a Lord Commissioner of the Treasury caused a by-election for both seats.

By-election, 7 May 1880: Hackney (2 seats)
Party	Candidate	Votes	%	±%
Liberal	Henry Fawcett	Unopposed		
Liberal	John Holms	Unopposed		
Liberal hold				
Liberal hold				

The death of Fawcett caused a by-election.

By-election, 20 Nov 1884: Hackney
Party	Candidate	Votes	%	±%
Liberal	James Stuart	14,540	63.0	−14.4
Conservative	Alexander MacAlister	8,543	37.0	+14.4
Majority		5,997	26.0	+11.4
Turnout		23,083	48.0	−17.5 (est)
Registered electors		48,076		
Liberal hold		Swing	−14.4	

== Sources ==
- Boundaries of Parliamentary Constituencies 1885-1972, compiled and edited by F.W.S. Craig (Parliamentary Reference Publications 1972)
- British Parliamentary Election Results 1832-1885, compiled and edited by F.W.S. Craig (Macmillan Press 1977)
- Social Geography of British Elections 1885-1910. by Henry Pelling (Macmillan 1967)
- Who's Who of British Members of Parliament: Volume I 1832-1885, edited by M. Stenton (The Harvester Press 1976)
- Who's Who of British Members of Parliament, Volume II 1886-1918, edited by M. Stenton and S. Lees (Harvester Press 1978)
