= McGillivray (surname) =

McGillivray is a surname. Notable people with the surname include:

- Alexander McGillivray, also known as Hoboi-Hili-Miko (1750–1793), leader of the Creek Indians during and after the American Revolution and principal chief of the Upper Creek (Muscogee) towns
- Alexander McGillivray (politician), Canadian lawyer and politician from Alberta, Canada
- Andy McGillivray (born 1954), Australian rules footballer
- Angus McGillivray (1842–??), Canadian lawyer and political figure from Nova Scotia, Canada
- C. R. McGillivray, or Calvin Ray McGillivray, American football coach
- Charlie McGillivray, Scottish footballer and manager
- David McGillivray (producer/screenwriter) (born 1947)
- David McGillivray (figure skater) (born 1949), Canadian figure skater
- Dave McGillivray, American race director; current director of the Boston Marathon
- Donald McGillivray (botanist), Australian botanical taxonomist
- Donald McGillivray (politician), a politician in British Columbia
- Duncan McGillivray, explorer and fur trader who accompanied David Thompson on explorations of the North-West Territory
- Edward McGillivray, the second mayor of Ottawa from 1858 to 1859
- Florence Helena McGillivray, Canadian painter
- James J. McGillivray, American politician, member of the Wisconsin State Assembly and the Wisconsin State Senate
- John McGillivray (fur trader) (c. 1770 – 1855), Canadian fur trader and political figure in Upper Canada
- John McGillivray (footballer) (1886–??), English footballer
- John Alexander McGillivray (1853–1911), Canadian lawyer and politician
- Lachlan McGillivray, Scottish-American Indian trader, store keeper, and plantation owner
- Lauchlan McGillivray (died 1880), 19th-century New Zealand politician and Member of Parliament from Southland, New Zealand
- Mal McGillivray (1929–1984), Australian rules footballer
- Perry McGillivray (1893–1944), American competition swimmer and water polo player, Olympian
- Scott McGillivray (born 1978), Canadian real estate investor, television host, financial expert, contractor, writer, public speaker and educator
- William McGillivray (1764–1825), Scottish-born Canadian fur trader
- William McGillivray, native name Coahoma, Chickasaw chief in northwest Mississippi
- William A. McGillivray (1918–1984), Canadian lawyer, jurist, and a Chief Justice of Alberta, Canada

Middle name

- Farquhar McGillivray Knowles (1859–1932), American painter
