= William Gill =

William, Will, Bill, or Billy Gill may refer to:

== Arts and entertainment ==
- William Ward Gill (1823–1894), English painter, brother of Edmund Marriner Gill
- William Henry Gill (composer) (1839–1923), Manx composer
- William Gill (dramatist) (1842–1919), American actor and playwright; author of Broadway's first hit musical, Adonis
- William Gill (photographer) (1854–1912), British photographer
- W. Walter Gill (William Walter Gill, 1876–1963), Manx scholar, folklorist and poet
- Will Gill (born 1968), Canadian artist

== Sports ==
- Billy Gill (1876–1930), Australian rules footballer
- Bill Gill (soccer) (1919–?), Canadian soccer goalkeeper
- William Gill (boxer) (fl. 2007–2009), American boxer

== Others ==
- William Gill (sea captain) (1795–1858), Manx master mariner
- William Wyatt Gill (1828–1896), English missionary
- William Gill (explorer) (1843–1882), British explorer and intelligence gatherer, companion of William Mesny
- William H. Gill (1886–1976), U.S. Army general
- William Henry Gill (ethnographer) (1861–1944), Australian ethnographer
- William Smith Gill (1865–1957), Scottish Volunteer Force officer and paint manufacturer
- William R. Gill, American diplomat

== See also ==
- William McGill (disambiguation)
- William Gillies (disambiguation)
