= Jimmy McGill (disambiguation) =

Jimmy McGill is the original name of Saul Goodman, a fictional character in the Breaking Bad franchise.

Jimmy McGill or James McGill may also refer to:

- James McGill (1744–1813), Scottish-Canadian businessman and founder of McGill University
- Jimmy McGill (footballer, born 1926) (1926–2013), Scottish footballer with Bury, Derby County, Kilmarnock, Berwick Rangers, Queen of the South and Cowdenbeath
- Jimmy McGill (footballer, born 1939) (1939–2006), footballer with Oldham Athletic, Crewe Alexandra, Chester City and Wrexham
- Jimmy McGill (footballer, born 1946) (1946–2015), Scottish footballer with Arsenal, Huddersfield Town, Hull City and Halifax Town
