= Magill House =

- U.S. National Register of Historic Places
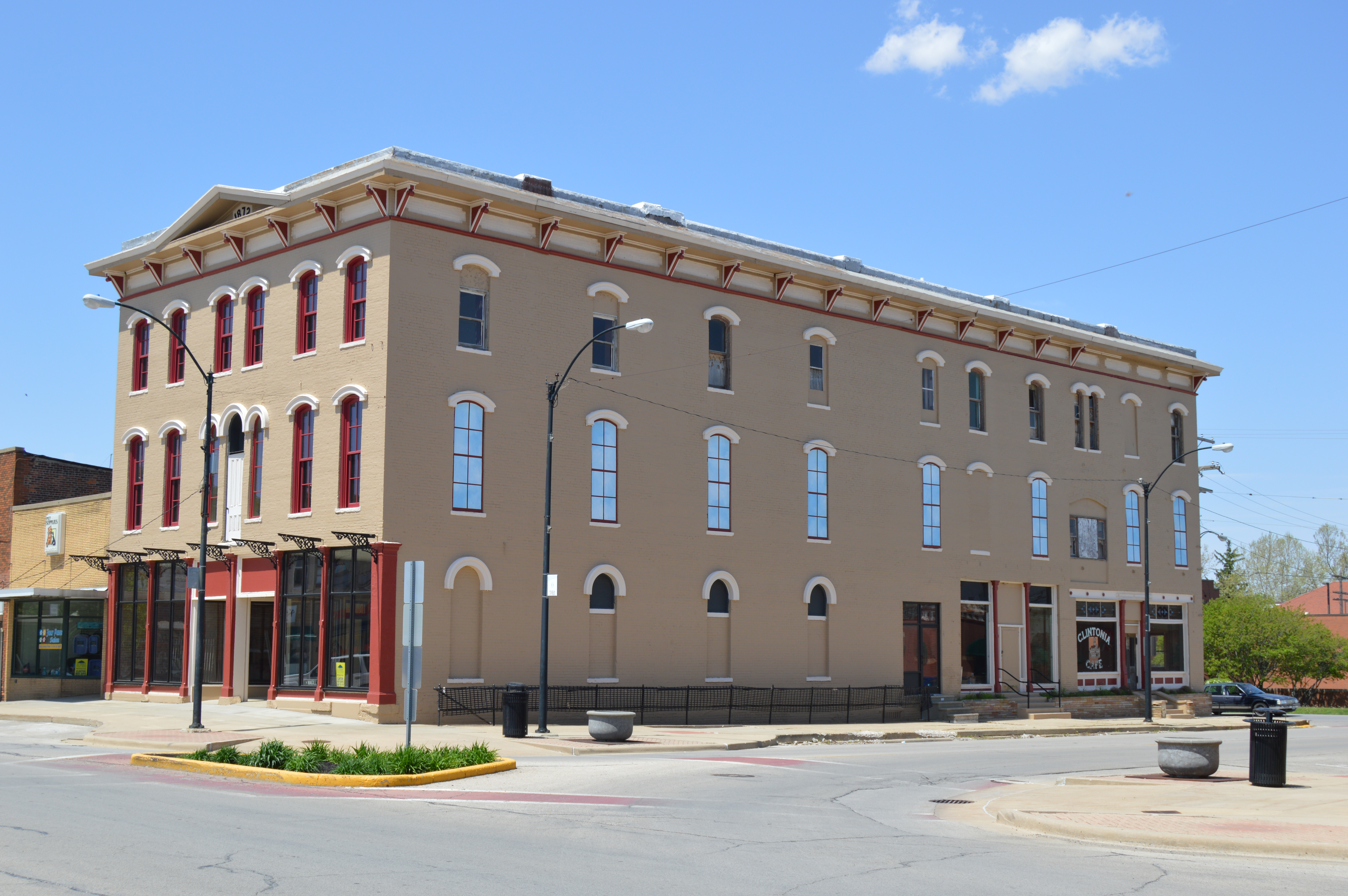
- Eastern side and front

- Location within Illinois Location within the United States
- Location: 100 N. Center St., Clinton, Illinois
- Coordinates: 40°9′8″N 88°57′33″W
- Area: less than one acre
- Built: 1872-73
- Built by: Magill Brothers
- Architectural style: Italianate
- NRHP reference No.: 03001202
- Added to NRHP: November 28, 2003

The Magill House is a historic hotel located at 100 N. Center St. in Clinton, Illinois. Construction on the building began in 1872 and was completed in 1873. The hotel was built in order to entice the Illinois Central Railroad to move the headquarters of its Springfield Division to Clinton; the effort was successful, as the railroad moved to Clinton in the late 1870s. From its construction through the mid-20th century, the hotel was considered the finest in Clinton, and housed both Illinois Central employees and travelers on the railroad. The hotel transitioned to an apartment hotel in the 1970s, and after the late 1980s it declined and ultimately closed.

The hotel was added to the National Register of Historic Places on November 28, 2003. It is one of two properties on the National Register in DeWitt County, along with the C. H. Moore House.
