= John McGill =

John McGill may refer to:

- Biraban (died 1846), indigenous Australian leader known to Europeans as John McGill
- Jack McGill (ice hockey, born 1921) (1921–1994), ice hockey player
- Jack McGill (ice hockey, born 1909) (1909–1988), ice hockey player
- J. Yancey McGill (born 1952), South Carolina senator
- John McGill (bishop) (1809–1872), American prelate of the Roman Catholic Church
- John Jones McGill (1860–1918), industrialist and philanthropist from Montreal, Québec
- John McGill (politician) (1752–1834), Upper Canada politician (Auditor General of Land Patents 1813-1818) and army officer

== See also ==
- Jack McGill (disambiguation)
