= 1874 Hackney by-election =

UK Parliamentary by-election

The 1874 Hackney by-election was held on 25 April 1874. The by-election was held due to the void election of the incumbent Liberal MP, John Holms. It was retained by the incumbent Holms along with Henry Fawcett.
