= Charles Robert Macgillivray =

Scottish physician and Gaelic scholar

- Born: 1804?
- Died: 1867; Glasgow
- Occupations: Physician and Gaelic scholar

Charles Robert Macgillivray (1804?–1867) was a Scottish physician and Gaelic scholar.

== Biography ==
Macgillivray was the son of a small farmer. He was born in Kilfinichen, Mull, about 1804. He received his elementary education at the school of his native parish, and when about twenty went to Glasgow, where he found employment in a druggist's shop. In 1849 he commenced business as a druggist, and in 1853 graduated M.D. In 1869 he was appointed lecturer in Gaelic at the Glasgow Institution. He died in Glasgow in 1867.

MacGillivray was an enthusiastic Gaelic scholar, and assisted Dr. Norman Macleod with his publications. In 1868 he published a Gaelic grammar, but his best-known work is a translation of John Bunyan's 'Pilgrim's Progress' (1869), in which he was helped by Archibald Macfadyen the hymn-writer. He also translated parts of John Howie's 'Scotch Biography' into Gaelic, published in London in 1870–3.
