= Ronan Magill =

British concert pianist and composer (born 1954)

Ronan Magill (born 1954, Sheffield, Yorkshire, England) is a British concert pianist and composer.

Born to Irish parents in Sheffield, Ronan Magill was a pupil at Ampleforth College, the prominent Catholic boarding school in North Yorkshire. Having begun to study with Fanny Waterman, he met Benjamin Britten, who, impressed by his abilities, became the young Magill's mentor ("I was amazed at his general musicality and intelligence and his is a remarkable gift"). This relationship lasted until Britten's death in 1976.

Magill was among the first intake of students at the Yehudi Menuhin School, where he was taught by Marcel Gazelle.

As a student at the Royal College of Music, Magill studied with David Parkhouse and John Barstow (piano) and Philip Cannon (composition). While at the college, he was awarded all the major prizes for both disciplines, finally graduating with the Hopkinson Gold Medal for piano and the Cobbett Prize for composition.

After his Wigmore Hall and South Bank debuts in 1974, Magill moved to Paris to study with Yvonne Lefebure at the Conservatoire; while there, he won the Premier Prix for piano, and in the years that followed made a number of appearances on French radio and television. His later teachers include Arturo Benedetti Michelangeli, Pierre Sancan and Nikita Magaloff.

In 1985 Magill was the winner of the First Milosz Magin International Piano Competition for Polish Music (this led to a well-received tour of Poland); in 1990 he was chosen to assist Mstislav Rostropovich in the preparations for his Jubilee concert.

Magill's second international competition victory was in 1994, when he won the Third British Contemporary Piano Competition. This led to appearances throughout the UK, including one at the 1995 Huddersfield International Contemporary Music Festival, where he performed with the English Northern Philharmonia conducted by Paul Daniel.

Since then he has given recitals at the South Bank, and concerto performances with the Royal Philharmonic and Philharmonia Orchestras, recitals at the South Bank, concertos with the Royal Philharmonic and Philharmonia Orchestras, and recitals at the Lichfield and Abbotsbury Festivals and the AL Bustan Festival in Beirut. In 1999 Magill performed Mozart's Piano Concerto K595 with the Belmont Ensemble at the Queen Elizabeth Hall.

In recent years, Ronan Magill has visited the Canterbury and Deal Festivals (2004), and made his first appearance in Japan (2005). He returned to Japan in 2006 and 2007, and was due to play there again in May 2009.

== Compositions ==
Magill remains active as composer, and has performed many of his own compositions at prominent venues, including the Wigmore Hall and the South Bank. In 1988 he performed the premiere of his work "Titanic 10th–15th April 1912" at the Salle Gaveau in Paris. This work (described as 'An atmospheric Poem in Five Pictures for Solo Piano'), has been recorded and is available on CD.

Having performed 'Titanic' at the Abbotsbury Music Festival, Magill was commissioned by the Festival to write a work for actors and singers and small orchestra to be called 'The Legend of St Catherine of Alexandria' (taken from the play 'Tyrannick Love' by John Dryden). This commission was supported by Millennium funding, the D'Oyly Carte Charitable Trust, and a grant from South West Arts. The piece was premiered in Abbotsbury in May 2000.
