= Andy McGillivray =

Australian rules footballer

Personal information
- Full name: Andrew McGillivray
- Born: 19 February 1954 (age 72)
- Original team: Gunbower
- Height: 188 cm (6 ft 2 in)
- Weight: 86 kg (190 lb)

Playing career^{1}
| Years | Club | Games (Goals) |
| 1977 | Geelong | 6 (4) |
- ^{1} Playing statistics correct to the end of 1977.

Andrew McGillivray (born 19 February 1954) is a former Australian rules footballer who played for the Geelong Football Club in the Victorian Football League (VFL).
