= McGill (disambiguation) =

McGill University is an English-language public research university in Montreal, Quebec, Canada.

McGill may also refer to:

== People ==
- McGill (surname) (including a list of individuals with the surname)
- McGill family (Monrovia), a prominent early Americo-Liberian family
- Anglicized variant for Clan Makgill, a Lowland Scottish clan
- Donald McGillivray (botanist), botanical taxonomist whose standard author abbreviation is “McGill”.

== Organizations ==
- McGill-Toolen Catholic High School, a private coeducational high school in Mobile, Alabama, United States
- McGill Executive Institute, a business school within McGill University located in Montreal, Quebec, Canada
- McGill Drug Store, a historical museum in McGill, Nevada
- McGill's Bus Services, bus operating firm based in Greenock, Inverclyde, Scotland
- McGill Motorsports, a NASCAR Busch Series team

== Places ==
=== Montreal ===
- McGill station
- McGill Street (Montreal)
- McGill College Avenue

=== Other places ===
- McGill, Nevada, a United States census-designated place in White Pine County, Nevada
- McGill Street (Vancouver), an east–west street in Vancouver, British Columbia
- Brandon Municipal Airport, also known as McGill Field, an airport near Brandon, Manitoba

== See also ==
- McGill Pain Questionnaire
- Magill (disambiguation)
