= Jack McGill (Canadian football) =

Canadian football player

Profile
- Position: T

Personal information
- Born: c. 1927
- Listed height: 5 ft 11 in (1.80 m)
- Listed weight: 208 lb (94 kg)

Career history
- 1945: Winnipeg Blue Bombers
- 1946–1948: Calgary Stampeders

Awards and highlights
- Grey Cup champion (1948)

Jack "Jim" McGill (born c. 1927) was a Canadian football player who played for the Calgary Stampeders. He won the Grey Cup with them in 1948. He previously played junior football in Calgary with the East End Golden Arrows.
