= Terry MacGill =

Australian cricketer

Personal information
- Full name: Terry Mornington David MacGill
- Born: 22 December 1945 (age 80); Brunswick, Victoria, Australia
- Batting: Right-handed
- Bowling: Right-arm leg spin
- Role: Bowler
- Relatives: Charlie MacGill (father); Stuart MacGill (son)

Domestic team information
- Years: Team
- 1968/69–1972/73: Western Australia
- FC debut: 27 December 1968 Western Australia v South Australia
- Last FC: 1 December 1972 Western Australia v New South Wales

Career statistics
Competition	First-class	List A
Matches	12	1
Runs scored	210	13
Batting average	15.00	13.00
100s/50s	0/0	0/0
Top score	34	13
Balls bowled	2,104	–
Wickets	23	–
Bowling average	40.04	–
5 wickets in innings	0	–
10 wickets in match	0	–
Best bowling	4/94	–
Catches/stumpings	7/–	0/–
- Source: cricinfo.com, 16 December 2011

Terry Mornington David MacGill (born 22 December 1945) is an Australian former cricketer. He played twelve first-class matches for Western Australia between 1968 and 1972. His father, Charlie MacGill, and his son, Stuart MacGill also played first-class cricket for Western Australia, with Stuart also playing 44 Tests for Australia. MacGill was also a professional at the Todmorden Cricket Club in the Lancashire League in 1970.
