= William Gill (photographer) =

English photographer

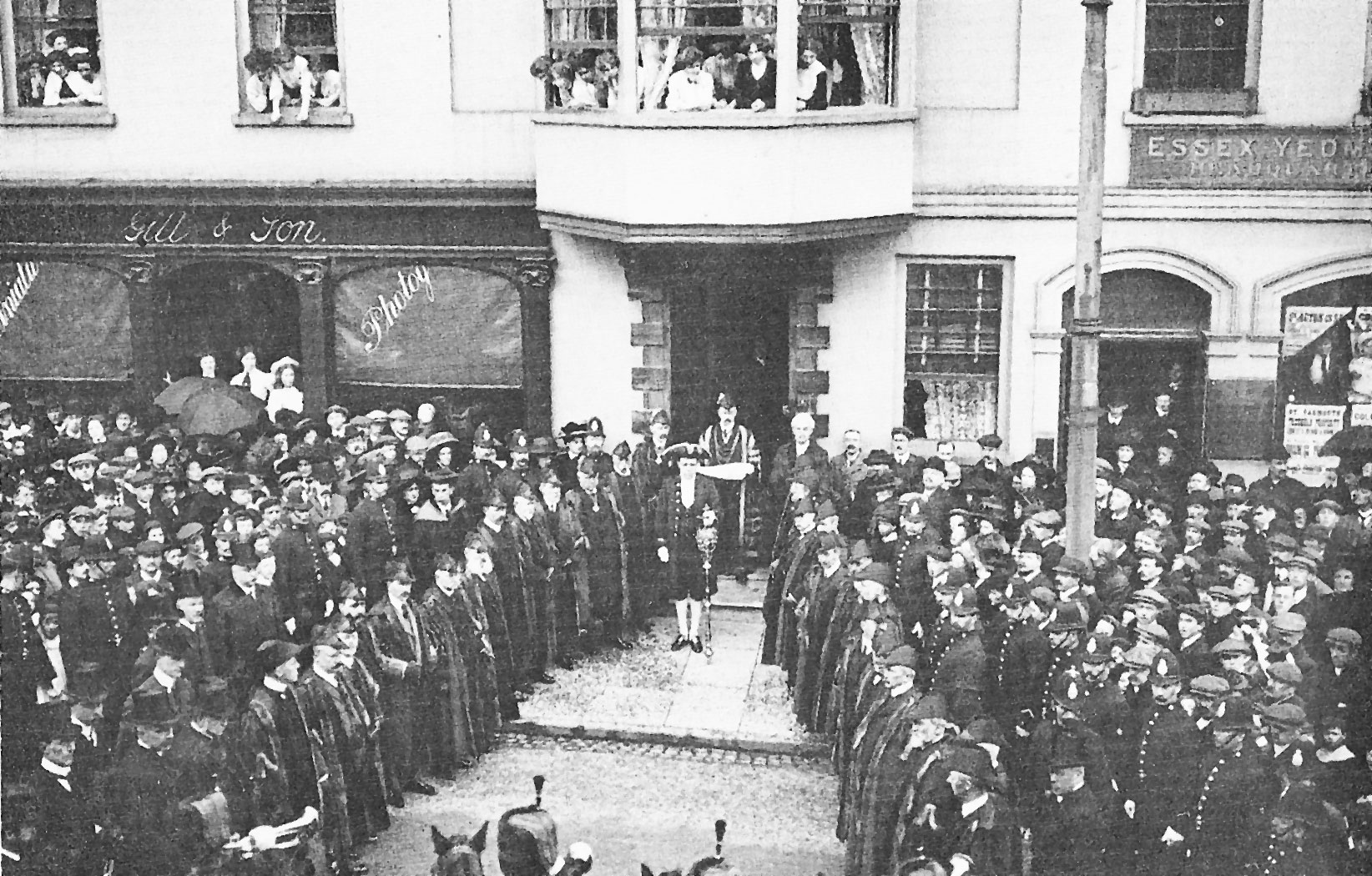
Gill & Son, Gill's Colchester premises, 1911

William Gill, FRPS, (1854, Islington - 23 February 1912, London) was an English photographer. Based in Colchester (a town recorded in a vast number of his photographs), but born in Islington, London, "he was an advocate of the real as against the sham studio accessory." At the time of his death, Gill was President of the Professional Photographers' Association. A contributor to a number of magazines, his death was widely reported in photographic circles, such as by Wilson's Photographic Magazine:

Mr. Gill's work will be remembered for its good qualities and home portrait effects secured by the use of window effects.
