= MacGill-Eain =

MacGill-Eain is a surname in Scottish Gaelic. The name corresponds to the surname MacLean, McLean in English.

== People with the surname ==
- Tormod MacGill-Eain, known in English as Norman Maclean (1936–2017), a Scottish Gaelic comedian, novelist, poet, musician and broadcaster.
- Somhairle MacGill-Eain, known in English as Sorley MacLean (1911–1996), a significant Scottish poet of the 20th century
