= Henry Fawcett =

British academic, statesman and economist (1833–1884)

The Right Honourable Henry Fawcett
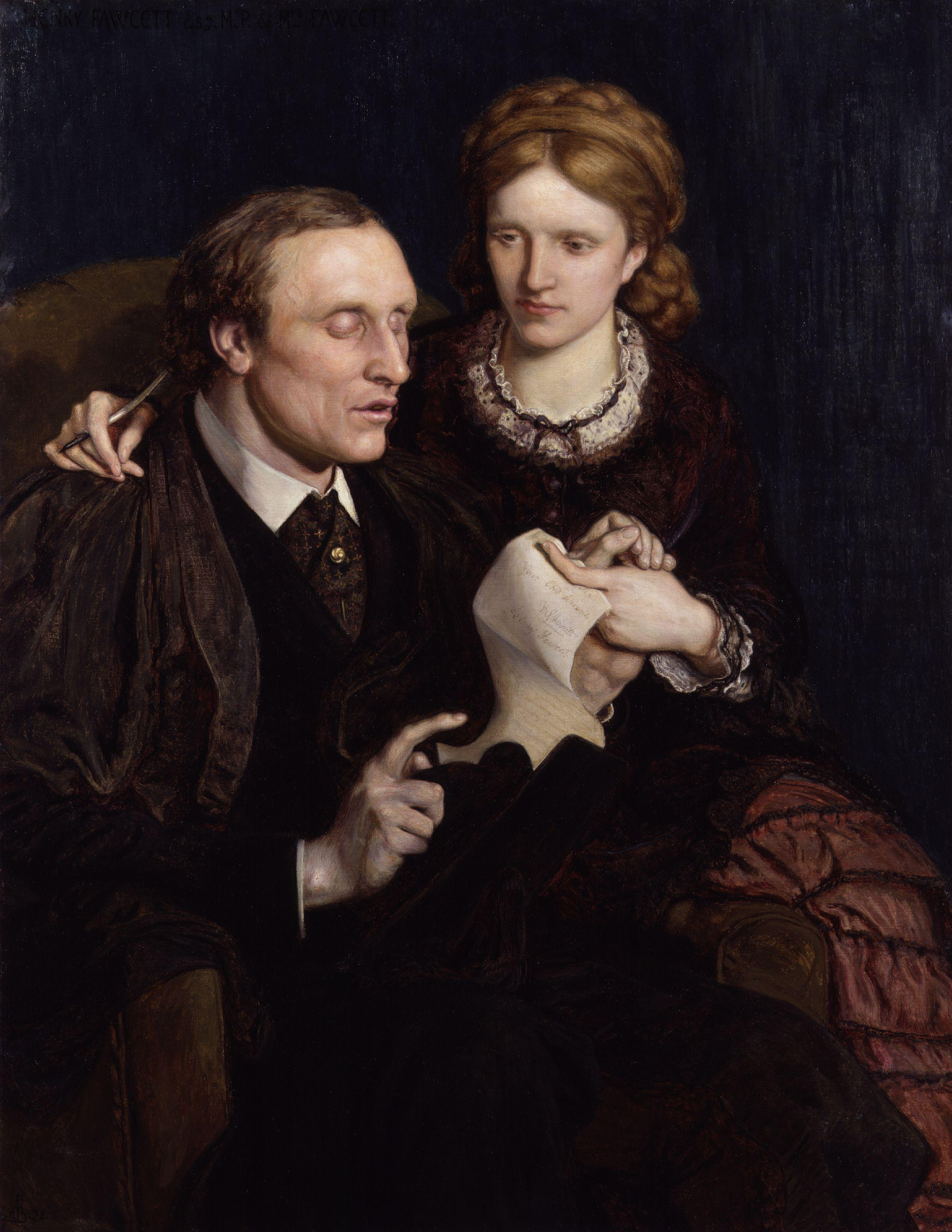
- Henry Fawcett and Millicent Garrett Fawcett by Ford Madox Brown, 1872, National Portrait Gallery, London.

Postmaster General
- In office 3 May 1880 – 6 November 1884
- Monarch: Queen Victoria
- Prime Minister: William Ewart Gladstone
- Preceded by: Lord John Manners
- Succeeded by: George Shaw-Lefevre

Personal details
- Born: 26 August 1833 Salisbury, England
- Died: 6 November 1884 (aged 51) Cambridge, England
- Party: Liberal
- Spouse(s): Millicent Garrett (1847–1929)
- Children: Philippa Fawcett
- Education: University of Cambridge

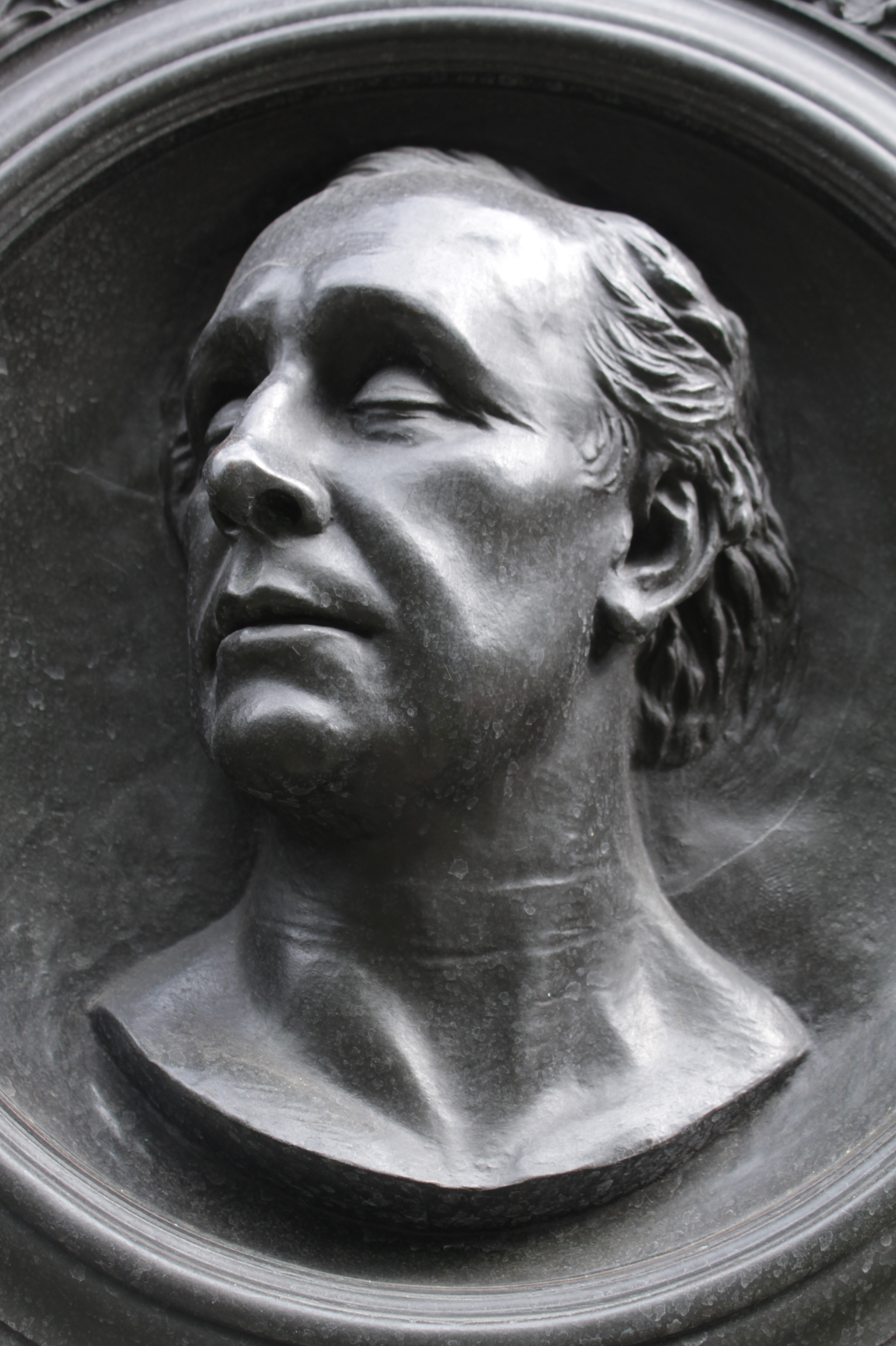
Henry Fawcett, close up of Fawcett Memorial in Victoria Embankment Gardens, London

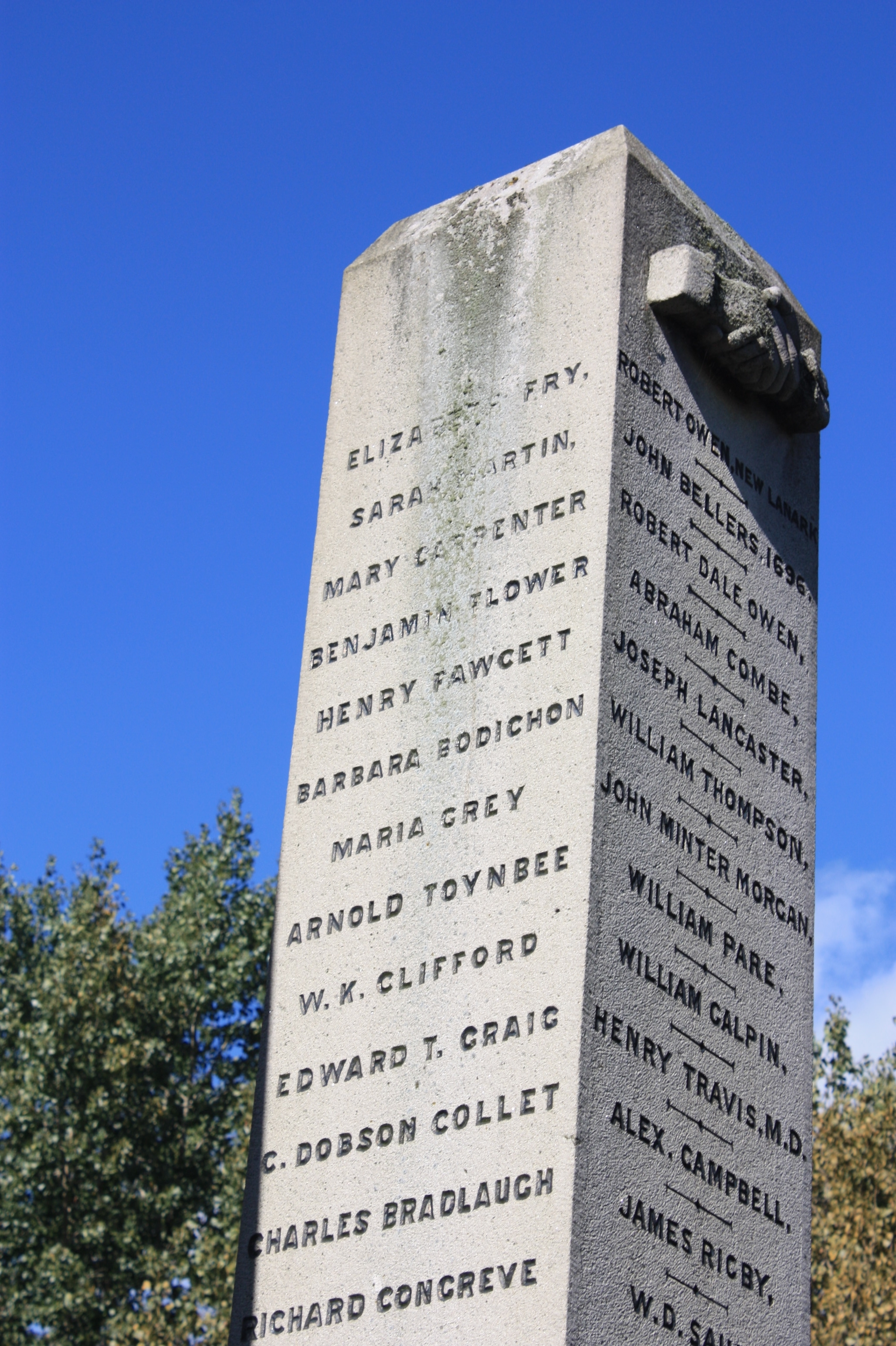
Fawcett's name on the Reformers Monument, Kensal Green Cemetery

Henry Fawcett (26 August 1833 – 6 November 1884) was a British academic, statesman and economist.

== Background and education ==
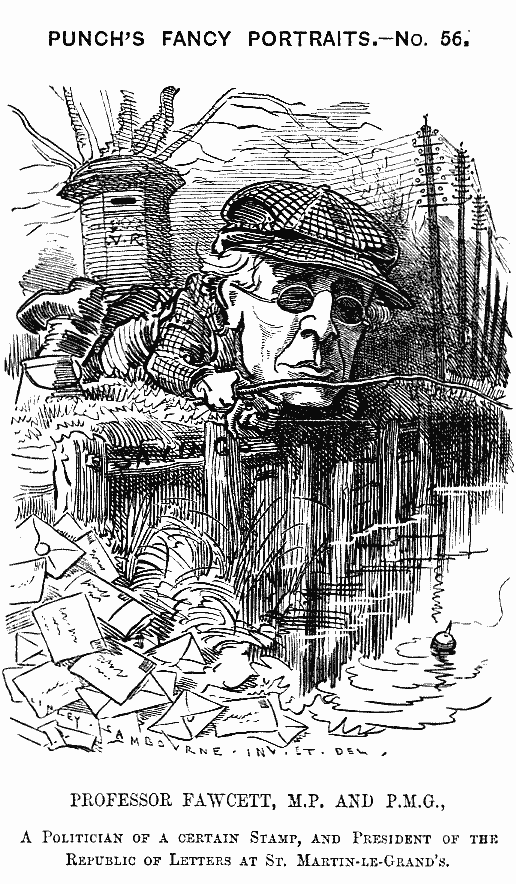
1881 Cartoon from Punch: "PROFESSOR FAWCETT, M.P and P.M.G., A Politician of a certain stamp, and President of the Republic of Letters at St. Martin-le-Grand's"

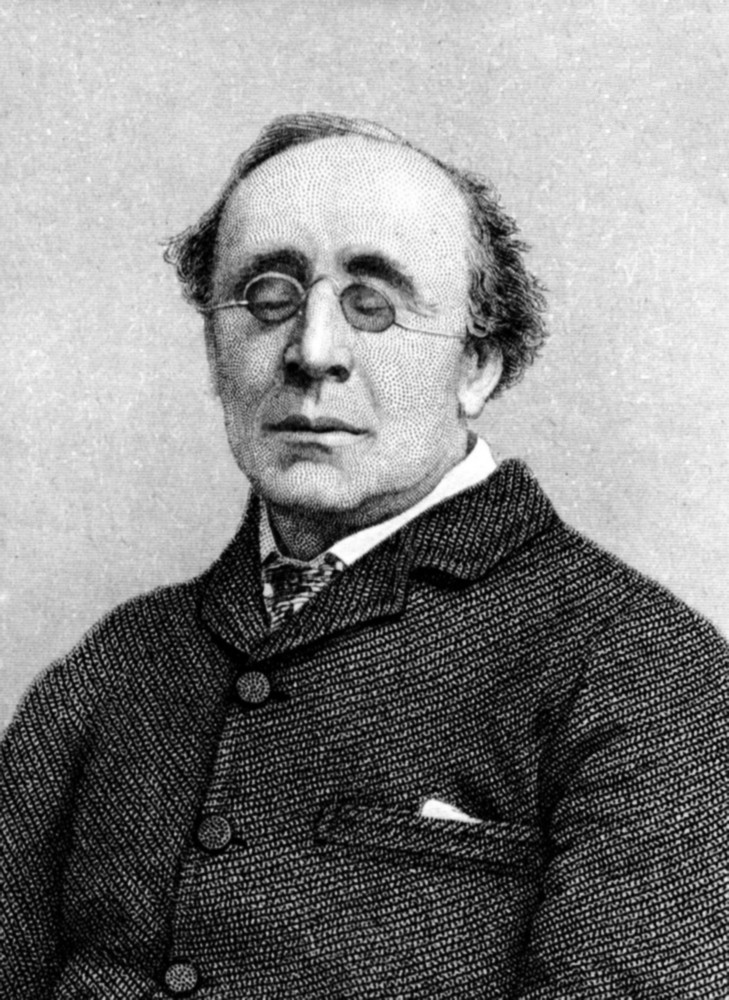
Henry Fawcett

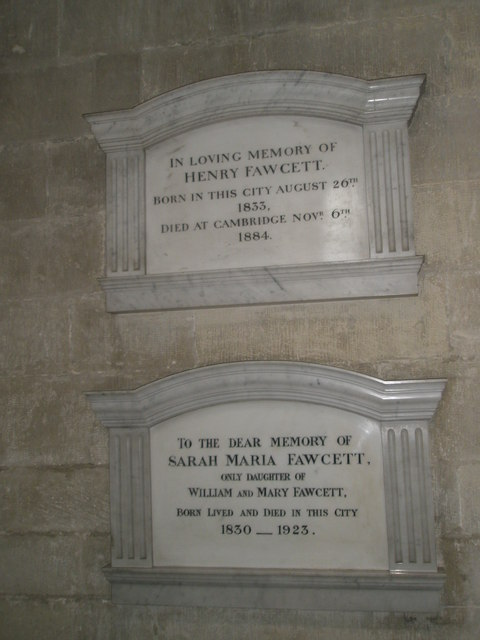
Monument to Henry Fawcett in Salisbury Cathedral

Henry Fawcett was born in Salisbury where his father was a gentleman farmer. He was educated at the Agricultural College, Queenwood, at King's College School and the University of Cambridge: entering Peterhouse in 1852, he migrated to Trinity Hall the following year, and became a fellow there in 1856, the year he graduated BA as 7th Wrangler.

In September 1858, when he was 25, he was blinded in a shooting accident. Despite his blindness, he continued with his studies, especially in economics. He was able to enter Lincoln's Inn, but decided against a career as a barrister and took his name off their books in 1860. He became a student of John Stuart Mill and wrote a Manual of Political Economy in 1863.

== Academic career ==
Two years later, Henry Fawcett reportedly attended the 1860 Oxford evolution debate, during which he was asked whether he thought Bishop Samuel Wilberforce had actually read the Origin of Species. Reportedly, Henry Fawcett replied loudly, "Oh no, I would swear he has never read a word of it". Ready to recriminate, Wilberforce swung round to him scowling, but stepped back and bit his tongue on noting that the speaker was the blind economist.

At the next meeting (in September 1861) of the British Association in Manchester, Henry Fawcett defended the logic behind Charles Darwin's theories. This significantly affected its acceptance.

In 1863, Henry Fawcett published his Manual of Political Economy and became Professor of Political Economy at Cambridge. He made himself a recognised authority on economics, his works on which include The Economic Position of the British Labourer (1865) and Labour and Wages.

In 1883, he was elected Rector of Glasgow University.

== Political career ==
After repeated defeats as a Liberal Party candidate, Henry Fawcett was elected Member of Parliament for Brighton in 1865. He held this seat until 1874, and thereafter represented Hackney between 1874 and 1884. He campaigned for women's suffrage. In 1880, he was appointed Postmaster General by William Ewart Gladstone and sworn of the Privy Council.

He had a particular interest in encouraging saving through the Post Office Savings Bank. He introduced the savings stamp which allowed people to save pennies at a time to build up the minimum account limit of a shilling. He pushed through parliament an act to allow savers to convert their post office savings to government stock and he developed the post office's life insurance and annuities schemes. He introduced many other innovations, including parcel post, postal orders, and licensing changes to permit payphones and trunk lines.

== Family ==
Through his campaigning for women's suffrage, Henry Fawcett met Elizabeth Garrett, to whom he proposed in 1865. She rejected the proposal to concentrate on becoming a doctor at a time when female doctors were extremely rare.

In 1867, Fawcett married Elizabeth's younger sister Millicent Garrett. They had one child, Philippa Fawcett.

Henry Fawcett's career was cut short by his premature death from pleurisy in November 1884, aged 51. He is buried in Trumpington Extension Cemetery, Cambridge where several members of the family of Charles Darwin are also buried, including Sir George Darwin, Lady Maud Darwin, and Gwen Raverat.

== Legacy ==
There are statues of him in Salisbury Market Square and in Victoria Embankment Gardens (Henry Fawcett Memorial) near Charing Cross in central London. The latter is by the eminent sculptor Mary Grant. A fine statue with an angel standing over a seated Henry Fawcett (by the sculptor George Tinworth) was erected in 1893 in Vauxhall Park (opened in 1890 on this site of Fawcett's house, The Lawns) but was removed by Lambeth Council in 1959. Alfred Gilbert was commissioned to make a memorial which stands in Westminster Abbey.

Sir Leslie Stephen wrote a biography of him, Life of Henry Fawcett, in 1885. He is listed amongst the important British Reformers on the "Reformers Memorial" in the centre of the eastmost oval section in Kensal Green Cemetery.

Fawcett Primary School in Trumpington, Cambridge, was opened in 1949 and named after Henry Fawcett who lived nearby. There is also a Henry Fawcett primary school in London, which opened in 1937.

Fawcett's time as Postmaster General was fondly remembered by many postal workers, and when London sorting clerks formed a union in 1890, they named it the Fawcett Association.

Parliament of the United Kingdom
Preceded by Henry Moor; James White	Member of Parliament for Brighton; 1865–1874; With: James White	Succeeded by James Lloyd Ashbury; Charles Cameron Shute
Preceded by John Holms; Sir Charles Reed	Member of Parliament for Hackney; 1874–1884; With: John Holms	Succeeded by James Stuart; John Holms
Political offices
Preceded by Lord John Manners	Postmaster General; 1880–1884	Succeeded by George Shaw-Lefevre
Academic offices
Preceded by John Bright	Rector of the University of Glasgow; 1883–1884	Succeeded by Edmund Law Lushington
