= Stuart MacGill =

Australian cricketer (born 1971)

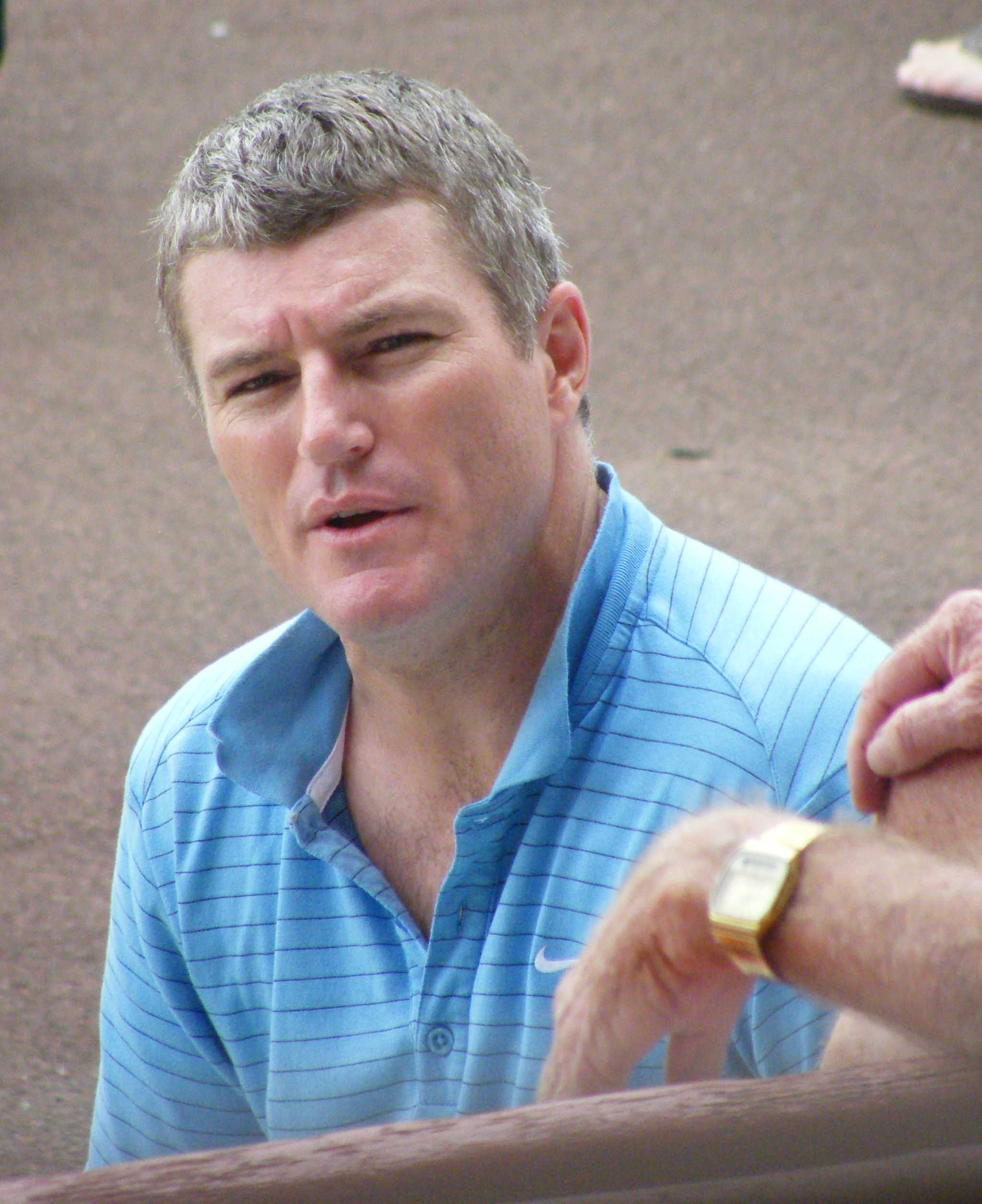
- MacGill in 2009

Personal information
- Full name: Stuart Charles Glyndwr MacGill
- Born: 25 February 1971 (age 55); Mount Lawley, Western Australia
- Nickname: Sweet Prince, Magilla Gorilla, SCG
- Batting: Right-handed
- Bowling: Right-arm leg spin
- Role: Bowler
- Relatives: Terry MacGill (father); Charlie MacGill (grandfather)

International information
- National side: Australia (1998–2008)
- Test debut (cap 374): 30 January 1998 v South Africa
- Last Test: 30 May 2008 v West Indies
- ODI debut (cap 141): 19 January 2000 v Pakistan
- Last ODI: 26 January 2000 v India

Domestic team information
- Years: Team
- 1993/94: Western Australia
- 1996/97–2007/08: New South Wales
- 1997: Somerset
- 1997–1998: Devon
- 2002–2004: Nottinghamshire
- 2011/12: Sydney Sixers

Career statistics
Competition	Test	ODI	FC	LA
Matches	44	3	184	107
Runs scored	349	1	1,536	171
Batting average	9.69	1.00	9.90	7.77
100s/50s	0/0	0/0	0/2	0/0
Top score	43	1	56*	26
Balls bowled	11,237	180	41,418	5,228
Wickets	208	6	774	193
Bowling average	29.02	17.50	30.48	22.52
5 wickets in innings	12	0	43	4
10 wickets in match	2	0	6	0
Best bowling	8/108	4/19	8/108	5/40
Catches/stumpings	16/–	2/–	76/–	22/–
- Source: ESPN Cricinfo, 20 September 2008

Stuart Charles Glyndwr MacGill (born 25 February 1971) is an Australian former cricketer who played 44 Test matches and three One Day Internationals for the Australian national cricket team. He is a right-arm leg spin bowler, who has been credited with having the best strike rate of any modern leg-spin bowler, but he did not have a regular place in the Australian Test team due to the dominance of Shane Warne in the position of sole spinner.

In domestic cricket, he played for Western Australia, New South Wales, Nottinghamshire, Devon and Somerset.

He was brought back in 2007 after the retirement of Warne, as spinner for the first Test against the Sri Lankan cricket team. He announced his retirement from international cricket during the second Test of Australia's 2008 tour of the West Indies. Moving into commentary, MacGill co-hosted the 2009 Ashes series on SBS with Damien Martyn and Greg Matthews. MacGill was a radio co-host on the Triple M Sydney breakfast program "The Grill Team", 2009–2010.

In 2021, MacGill was the victim of an alleged kidnapping in the Sydney suburb of Cremorne. In 2023, he was charged with conspiracy to supply cocaine. In March 2025, a jury found MacGill guilty of knowingly taking part in the supply of a prohibited drug.

== Early years ==
MacGill was born in the Perth suburb of Mount Lawley and began his first-class career in the 1993/94 season playing for Western Australia. Both his father, Terry MacGill, and his grandfather, Charlie MacGill, had previously played cricket for Western Australia. He was an AIS Australian Cricket Academy scholarship holder in 1990–1991. He managed just one game, against New South Wales at the SCG but did not take a wicket and did not play again for over two years. When he returned in 1996/97 it was for New South Wales and he took 6 wickets in the match, the first being Darren Berry. He finished the season with 16 wickets at 37.00.

He spent the English summer playing club cricket for Heathcoat CC in Tiverton, Devon, and played a game for Somerset against the touring Pakistan A side.

The 1997/98 season was a breakthrough for MacGill, he made his Test debut and finished with 35 wickets at 28.14 in the Sheffield Shield.

== International career ==
=== Test career ===
In the 3rd Test against South Africa at Adelaide in January 1998, MacGill was selected as Australia's second spinner and helped them to draw the match with 3 for 22 in the second innings. He next appeared in October of that year for a tour of Pakistan, finishing the series as Australia's top wicket taker with 15 wickets at 27.46.

MacGill kept his spot in the side when they returned home for an Ashes series, again finishing as Australia's most successful bowler with 27 wickets at 17.70. His tally included his then career best innings figures of 7 for 50, made in the 5th Test at Sydney. He took a total of 12 wickets in that match and had done enough to convince the selectors to use two spinners for their tour of the West Indies. The leg-spin duo of Warne and MacGill had limited success: Warne, who was returning from injury, took 2 wickets in three tests, while MacGill took 12 wickets in four tests, as Australia drew the series 2–2.

The following summer, with Warne back to full fitness, MacGill was dropped from the side, only returning when Warne was again injured in the summer of 2000–2001, when Australia hosted the West Indies. In a series whitewash, all the Australian bowlers bar MacGill, who took 16 wickets at 31.31, managed to average under 20 with the ball.

He played his next Test in January 2002 against South Africa, taking 7 wickets. With Warne unavailable for the 4th and 5th Tests of the 2002/03 Ashes series, MacGill came in and despite taking 12 wickets he averaged over 40.

With Shane Warne serving a drugs ban, MacGill returned to the Caribbean in 2003 and for the next year acted as Australia's sole spinner. In the 11 Tests that he played, including the Caribbean tour, he took 53 wickets. He played series against Bangladesh, Zimbabwe and India.

Sri Lanka toured Australia in 2004 and despite Warne returning to the side MacGill kept his spot. He struggled throughout the Test series and took just 5 wickets at 46.40. He lost his spot in the side and over the next year and a half played just two Tests, both on the spin friendly SCG wicket. The first was against Pakistan and his 8 wickets earned him the Man of the Match award. The second was against the ICC World XI and he managed 9 wickets. He was called up as part of Australia's 2005 Ashes squad but was not used throughout the series.

A graph showing MacGill's Test career bowling statistics and how they have varied over time.

MacGill partnered Warne when Australia hosted the West Indies for a Test series in 2005/06. He took 5 wickets at Hobart and just 2 in Adelaide. He played again in the Tests that followed, against South Africa, and won a place in Australia's squad for their inaugural tour of Bangladesh. At Fatullah he took 8 for 108 in the first innings, his career best figures. Warne retired from Test cricket at the end of the 2006–07 Ashes series, although MacGill faced competition for a place in the side from several younger players. MacGill is the quickest spinner to 150 Test wickets in terms of deliveries, when he reached 150 wickets by 8312 deliveries.

MacGill played 3 ODIs taking 6 wickets in three games at an economy of 3.50.

=== Retirement ===
MacGill announced that he would retire after the 2nd Test against the West Indies, due to recurring injuries to his knee and nerves in the arm leading to the fingers. Over his career, he has scored more 5-wicket innings than Shane Warne at Sydney Cricket Ground (SCG). Both Warne and MacGill's records were etched on the home (international) team dressing room's honours board in SCG.

MacGill returned to cricket in the 2011–12 season, signing to play for the Sydney Sixers in Australia's inaugural Big Bash League at the age of 40. He was a key member of the side's Premiership triumph against the Perth Scorchers at the WACA, despite being one of the least-fancied sides.

== Personal life ==
MacGill's father, Terry MacGill, and grandfather, Charlie MacGill, both played first-class cricket for Western Australia.

MacGill married actress and journalist Rachel Friend, in 2000. The couple separated in late 2013.

MacGill is noted for his fondness for wine, holding a degree in viticulture, and books, once reading 21 novels during a tour of Pakistan. In retirement he appeared as a guest in the Australian wine comedy show Plonk. Known for his individuality, he was the only Australian cricketer to declare himself unavailable to tour Zimbabwe in 2004 on moral grounds. He also refused to appear in an advertisement for Cricket Australia sponsor KFC, saying: "The problem for me is that KFC and Cricket Australia are hitting parents where they’re vulnerable. Parents are already under a lot of pressure from kids to buy this stuff and when you get the Australian cricket team endorsing it you just increase that pressure. It’s just wrong in so many ways."

In 2015, MacGill sued Cricket Australia for A$2.6 million for not making injury payments following his retirement in 2008. The matter was settled out of court in 2017.

=== Cocaine supplying, alleged kidnapping and trial ===
MacGill was the victim of an alleged targeted kidnapping in the Sydney suburb of Cremorne on 14 April 2021. MacGill was allegedly dragged into a car at around 8pm local time and driven to a property in Bringelly in Sydney's west where he was assaulted by four men, who were arrested over the incident a month later. The police later stated that the kidnappers' "motive was purely financial". Marino Sotiropoulos, the brother of Stuart MacGill's partner Maria O'Meagher was also among those who were arrested by the police in connection with the alleged kidnapping, allegedly linked to a cocaine supply deal involving MacGill that had gone wrong. In September 2023, MacGill was charged with taking part in the supply of a large commercial quantity of cocaine. In March 2025, a jury found MacGill guilty of the charge of knowingly taking part in the supply of a prohibited drug and not guilty of the charge of knowingly taking part in the supply of a large commercial quantity of a prohibited drug. In May 2025, he was sentenced to a 22-month intensive corrections order and ordered to perform 495 hours of community service.
