= MacGillivray =

MacGillivray is a surname and given name derived from the Gaelic language. The name can be written in modern Scottish Gaelic as Bràigheach, MacGille, MacGilleBhràth, and MacIlleBhràth. MacGillivray may refer to:

== People ==
Given name:

- MacGillivray Milne (1882–1959), 27th Governor of American Samoa

Surname:

- Carolina Henriette MacGillavry(1904–1993), Dutch chemist
- Charles Robert Macgillivray (1804?–1867), Scottish physician and Gaelic scholar
- Charles Andrew MacGillivary (1917–2000), Canadian-born American soldier
- Donald MacGillivray (1906–1966), Scottish colonial administrator, last British high commissioner in Malaya
- Helen MacGillivray, Australian statistician
- James Pittendrigh MacGillivray (1856–1938), Scottish sculptor and poet
- John MacGillivray (1821–1867), Scottish naturalist active in Australia
- Ivor MacGillivray (1840–1939), Australian politician
- Paul MacGillivray (1834–1895), Scottish surgeon and naturalist, active in Australia
- William MacGillivray (1796–1852), Scottish naturalist
- William D. MacGillivray (born 1946), Canadian film director and screenwriter
- Allister MacGillivray (born 1948), Canadian composer, guitarist, author

== Places ==
- MacGillivray, South Australia, a locality on Kangaroo Island, Australia
- McGillivray, British Columbia, an unincorporated community in Canada

== Other ==
- MacGillivray Freeman Films, a film studio based in Laguna Beach, CA

== Other uses ==
- MacGillivray's warbler (Oporornis tolmiei), a bird species
- Clan Macgillivray, a Scottish clan
