= Charlie MacGill =

Australian cricketer

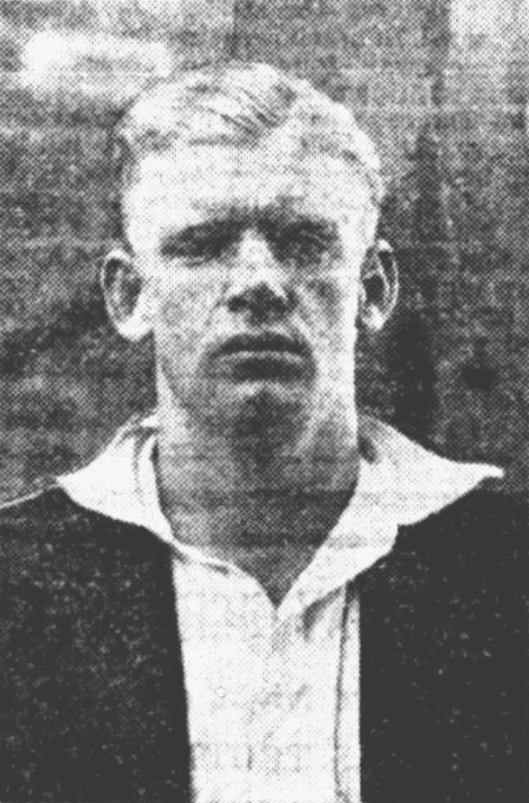

Personal information
- Full name: Charles William Terry MacGill
- Born: 16 June 1916; Perth, Western Australia
- Died: 31 October 1999 (aged 83); Perth, Western Australia
- Batting: Right-handed
- Bowling: Right-arm fast-medium
- Role: All-rounder
- Relatives: Terry MacGill (son); Stuart MacGill (grandson)

Domestic team information
- Years: Team
- 1938/39–1950/51: Western Australia
- First-class debut: 4 March 1939 Western Australia v Victoria
- Last First-class: 23 February 1951 Western Australia v South Australia

Career statistics
Competition	First-class
Matches	6
Runs scored	250
Batting average	25.00
100s/50s	0/1
Top score	78
Balls bowled	1,220
Wickets	19
Bowling average	29.42
5 wickets in innings	0
10 wickets in match	0
Best bowling	4/42
Catches/stumpings	5/–
- Source: CricketArchive, 14 November 2011

Charles William Terry MacGill (16 June 1916 – 31 October 1999) was an Australian cricketer. He played six first-class cricket matches for Western Australia between 1939 and 1951. MacGill also served with the Royal Australian Air Force during World War II. He played the first four of his six first-class matches in 1939/1940, before World War II intervened. MacGill played another two first-class matches a full decade later, in 1950/1951. His son, Terry MacGill, and grandson, Stuart MacGill, both played first-class cricket for Western Australia, with Stuart also playing 44 Tests for Australia.
