= 1884 Hackney by-election =

UK by-election

The 1884 Hackney by-election was fought on 20 November 1884. It was triggered by the death of Liberal MP Henry Fawcett. The seat was subsequently held by the Liberal Party.

== Result ==
By-election, 20 Nov 1884: Hackney
Party	Candidate	Votes	%	±%
Liberal	James Stuart	14,540	63.0	−14.4
Conservative	Alexander MacAlister	8,543	37.0	+14.4
Majority		5,997	26.0	+11.4
Turnout		23,083	48.0	−17.5 (est)
Registered electors		48,076		
Liberal hold		Swing	−14.4	
