= John Holms =

Scottish businessman and politician

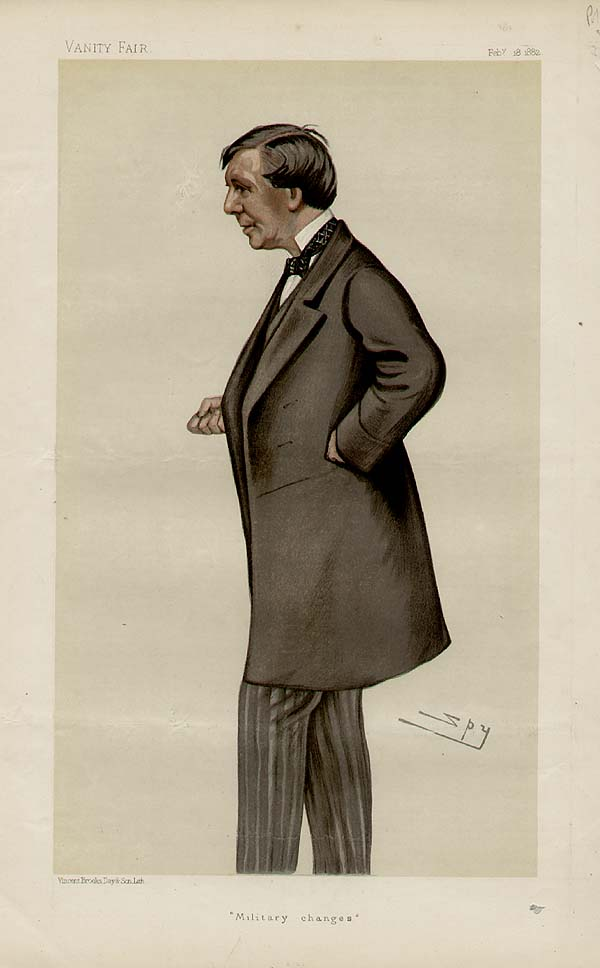
"Military changes" Holms as caricatured by Spy (Leslie Ward) in Vanity Fair, February 1882

John Holms JP, DL (21 September 1830 – 31 March 1891), was a Scottish businessman and Liberal politician.

== Background ==
Holms was the son of James Holms of Sancel Bank, Paisley, and his wife Janet Love, daughter of James Love, of Paisley. His brother William Holms was MP for Paisley.

== Career ==
Holms was a partner in W. Holms Bros, spinners, of Glasgow.

He was elected member of parliament for Hackney in 1860, and served in the second Liberal administration of William Ewart Gladstone as a Junior Lord of the Treasury from 1880 to 1882 and as Parliamentary Secretary to the Board of Trade from 1882 to 1885. When Hackney was divided into single-member constituencies in 1885 John stood for the Central division. He was defeated by his Conservative opponent by 193 votes. Just a few days later he was seriously injured in an accident on the London Underground and rendered an invalid for the remainder of his life.

He was also a justice of the peace for Lanarkshire, Middlesex and Westminster and a deputy lieutenant for Tower Hamlets. He was the author of military books including The British Army in 1875 and Our Military Difficulty.

== Personal life ==
Holms married Elizabeth Lyon, daughter of Edward Lyon of Kennington in 1856. He died in March 1891, aged 60.

Parliament of the United Kingdom
New constituency	Member of Parliament for Hackney; 1868 – 1885; With: Sir Charles Reed 1868–74; Henry Fawcett 1874–84; James Stuart 1884–85	Constituency abolished
Political offices
Preceded by Rowland Winn; Sir James Dalrymple-Horn-Elphinstone, Bt; Viscount Crichton	Junior Lord of the Treasury; 1880–1882; With: Sir Arthur Hayter, Bt 1880–82; Charles Cecil Cotes 1880–82; Herbert Gladstone 1881–82	Succeeded by Charles Cecil Cotes; Herbert Gladstone; Robert Duff
Preceded by Evelyn Ashley	Parliamentary Secretary to the Board of Trade; 1882–1885	Succeeded by Baron Henry de Worms
