= A. D. McGill =

Australian barrister (1886–1952)

Alexander (or Alec) Douglas McGill KC (2 January 1886 – 6 July 1952) was a lawyer in Brisbane, Australia.

== History ==
McGill was born in Newtown, Ipswich, Queensland, a son of James McGill, Thorn-street, Ipswich. He attended Newtown School, winning a scholarship to the Ipswich Grammar School. He then won a Lewis Thomas Exhibition, which took him to Sydney University, where he studied Law. He was called to the Queensland Bar in June 1911 and in 1934 was appointed a King's Counsel.

McGill appeared in many of Queensland's biggest court cases.

== Family ==
McGill married Eva Minnie Grace Hardwicke, of Graceville, Brisbane, on 26 September 1914. Their children included

- John Alexander D. McGill (c. 1918 – 10 June 1944) was killed with RAAF during WWII
- Helen Mary McGill married Robert E. Wigginton in October 1943 and lived in USA
- Jean Louise McGill married Francis Needham Bell sometime around 1948

They had a home "Rankeillour" on Feez Street, Yeronga, Queensland.
