= Henry Lacy =

British politician (1799–1869)

Member of Parliament for Bodmin
- In office 29 July 1847 – 8 July 1852 Serving with James Wyld
- Preceded by: Samuel Thomas Spry; John Dunn Gardner
- Succeeded by: William Michell; Charles Graves-Sawle

Personal details
- Born: 1799
- Died: 1869 (aged 69–70)
- Party: Whig

Henry Charles Lacy (1799 – 1869) was a British Whig politician.

Lacy became a Whig Member of Parliament (MP) for Bodmin at the 1847 general election, but stood down at the next election in 1852.

Parliament of the United Kingdom
Preceded by Samuel Thomas Spry; John Dunn Gardner	Member of Parliament for Bodmin; 1847–1852; With: James Wyld	Succeeded by William Michell; Charles Graves-Sawle
