= Humphrey Smith (MP) =

16th-century English politician

Humphrey Smith (c. 1542 – 15 September 1589), from London and Cullompton, Devon, was an English politician.

== Family and education ==
Smith was educated at the Inner Temple in 1556. Later in the year 1586, he married Ursula, who was probably the daughter of Thomas Leveson, probably one of the Leveson of Hornes Place, Kent. They had one son, Walter.

== Career ==
Smith was a justice of the peace for Devon c. 1573–1587 and for Middlesex from c. 1579, probably until his death. He was a bencher in the Inner Temple in 1574, an Autumn reader 1576 or 1577 and a Lent reader in 1587. Smith's patron was probably Francis Russell, 2nd Earl of Bedford. His legal role means he must have been in London the majority of the time, rather than his constituency.

He was a member (MP) of the Parliament of England for Bodmin in 1571.

== Death ==
Smith died on 15 September 1589. His will was made the same day, with his wife, Ursula, as the executrix, and their son, Walter, was left in her care aged eighteen months.

Parliament of England
Preceded by John Mallett; Francis Browne	Member of Parliament for Bodmin; 1571; With: John Kestall	Succeeded by Thomas Cromwell; Edmund Pooley
