= Chamond =

Chamond is a surname. Notable people with the surname include:

- Digory Chamond (died 1611), MP Parliament of England
- Emmanuel Chamond (c. 1553–1611), MP Parliament of England
- John Chamond (fl. 1529–1540), MP Parliament of England
- Richard Chamond, MP for Cornwall

== See also ==
- St Chamond (disambiguation)
