= John Breton =

John Breton may refer to:

- John de Breton (died 1275), bishop
- John le Breton, MP for Essex in 1290
- John Breton (fl. 1328), MP for Wallingford
- John Breton I, MP for Bodmin 1380–1384, 1388–1397, Lostwithiel 1384 and 1386
- John Breton II, MP for Bodmin in 1386
- John Breton (academic) (died 1676), master of Emmanuel College, Cambridge
- John Breton (died 1587), MP for Tamworth
