= Tregonan =

Tregonan may refer to:

- Tregonan Grange
- Otto Tregonan
