= John Drewe (disambiguation) =

John Drewe (born 1948) is a British forger.

John Drewe may also refer to:

- John Drewe (MP) (fl. 1393), English politician

== See also ==
- John Drew (disambiguation)
