= John Breton II =

English politician

John Breton (fl. 1386) was an English politician.

He was a member (MP) of the parliament of England for Bodmin in 1386.

Parliament of England
Preceded by ? ?	Member of Parliament for Bodmin; 1386; With: Henry Baudyn	Succeeded by Stephen Bant; John Syreston
