= Charles Vivian, 2nd Baron Vivian =

British peer and Whig politician

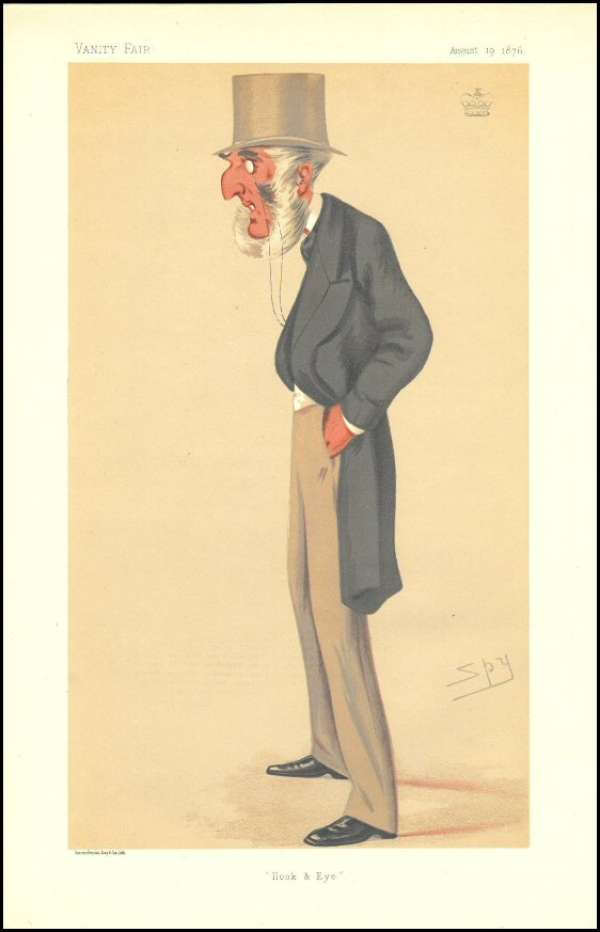
"Hook & eye". Caricature by Spy published in Vanity Fair in 1876.

Charles Crespigny Vivian, 2nd Baron Vivian (24 December 1808 – 24 April 1886), was a British peer and Whig politician from the Vivian family.

== Background ==
Vivian was the eldest legitimate son of Hussey Vivian, 1st Baron Vivian (1775–1842), and Eliza (1784–1831), daughter of Philip Champion de Crespigny (1738–1803).

== Political career ==
Vivian sat as a Member of Parliament for Bodmin between 1835 and 1842. The latter year he succeeded his father in the barony and entered the House of Lords. He also served as Lord Lieutenant of Cornwall from 1856 to 1877.

== Family ==
Vivian married Arabella, daughter of Rev. John Middleton Scott, in 1833. She died in January 1837, having borne two children:

- Hussey Crespigny Vivian, 3rd Baron Vivian (19 June 1834 - 21 October 1893)
- John Brabazon Vivian (20 October 1836 – 12 February 1874)

He remarried in 1841, to Mary Elizabeth Panton, with whom he had seven further children:

- Edith Vivian (died 15 July 1926)
- Mary Charlotte Martha Vivian (13 October 1842 – 30 October 1917)
- Maud Frances Vivian (22 November 1845 – 16 June 1893)
- Charles Hussey Panton Vivian (26 June 1847 – 12 March 1892)
- Robert Champion Vivian (April 1854 – 29 August 1876)
- Walter Warrick Vivian (18 May 1856 – 13 September 1943), head agent of the Dinorwic Quarry

== Death ==
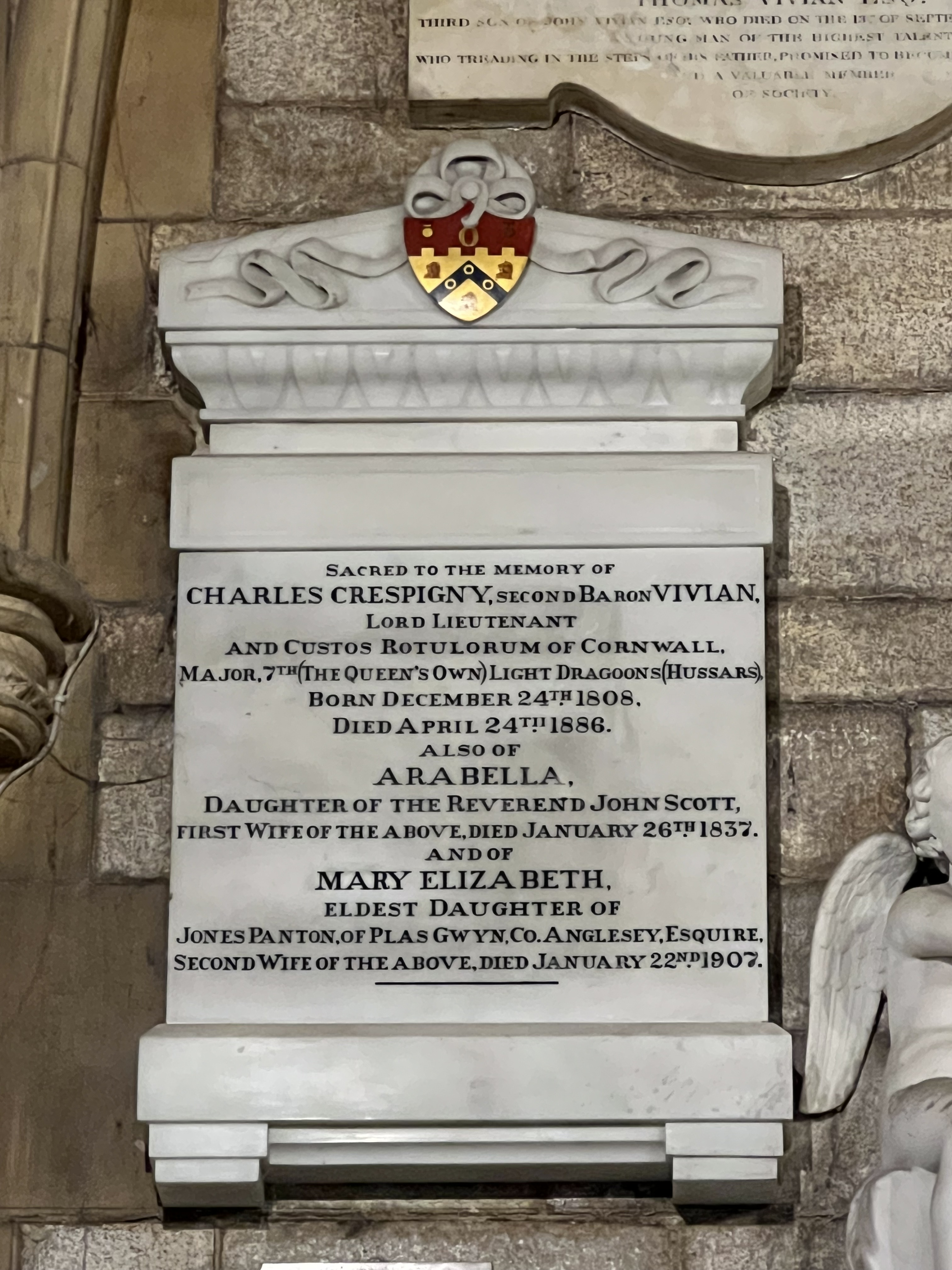
Memorial in Truro Cathedral

Vivian died in April 1886, aged 77, and was succeeded in the barony by his son, Hussey, who became a prominent diplomat.

Parliament of the United Kingdom
Preceded by William Peter; Samuel Thomas Spry	Member of Parliament for Bodmin; 1835–1842; With: Samuel Thomas Spry 1835–1841; John Dunn-Gardner 1841–1843	Succeeded by John Dunn-Gardner; Sir Samuel Thomas Spry
Honorary titles
Preceded by Sir William Salusbury-Trelawny, Bt	Lord Lieutenant of Cornwall; 1856–1877	Succeeded by The Earl of Mount Edgcumbe
Peerage of the United Kingdom
Preceded by Richard Hussey Vivian	Baron Vivian; 1842–1886	Succeeded by Hussey Vivian
