= Ruth Dillon =

American Standardbred racehorse

- Breed: Standardbred
- Sire: Sidney Dillon
- Dam: Russie Russell
- Sex: Mare
- Breeder: Santa Rosa Stockfarm
- Record: Trotting, 2:04

Ruth Dillon was a Standardbred who set a harness racing world record for trotting 3-year-old fillies at 2:15 1/4 and then as a 4-year old set the record of 2:06 1/2.

Driven by Millard Sanders, she won a $10,000 purse racing at Columbus.

Her gait was upright and toe-weights were added to the fronts of her shoes to counter her tendency towards pacing rather than trotting.

She was bred in the Santa Rosa Stockfarm before being sold to Sterling R Holt of Indianapolis. She was sired by Sidney Dillon and was the half sister of Lou Dillon, who was the first horse to break the 2 minute mile. Her dam was Russie Russell, who gave birth to two other trotters (Guy Boy and Red Star) who were recorded as running the mile in under 2 minutes and 10 seconds.
