= Thomas Treffry =

Thomas Treffry may refer to:

- Thomas Treffry (died 1564), MP for Bodmin
- Thomas Treffry II, MP for Bodmin in 1545
