= Thomas Poley =

16th-century English politician

Thomas Poley (by 1523 – 1563 or 1564), of London and Ware, Hertfordshire was an English politician. He was a Member of Parliament (MP) for Melcombe Regis in 1545, Ipswich in April 1554 and Ripon in 1555.

Thomas was the son of Edmund Poley and Mirabel Garneys. His brother, John Poley, married Anne, daughter of Thomas Wentworth, 1st Baron Wentworth. Their son, Edmund Poley was also an MP.

On 11 July 1553 Thomas Cornwallis had declared Lady Jane Grey as Queen of England succeeding Edward VI at the Cornhill, Ipswich. However, later that day, Poley declared Mary Tudor to be the rightful Queen.
