= John Drewe (MP) =

14th-century English politician

John Drewe (fl. 1393) was an English politician.

Drewe was a member of parliament for Bodmin, Cornwall in 1393. Little more is known of him.

Parliament of England
Preceded by John Breton I with Thomas Bere	Member of Parliament for Bodmin; 1393; With: John Breton I	Unknown
