= Anna Gelderd =

British politician

Anna Gelderd MP
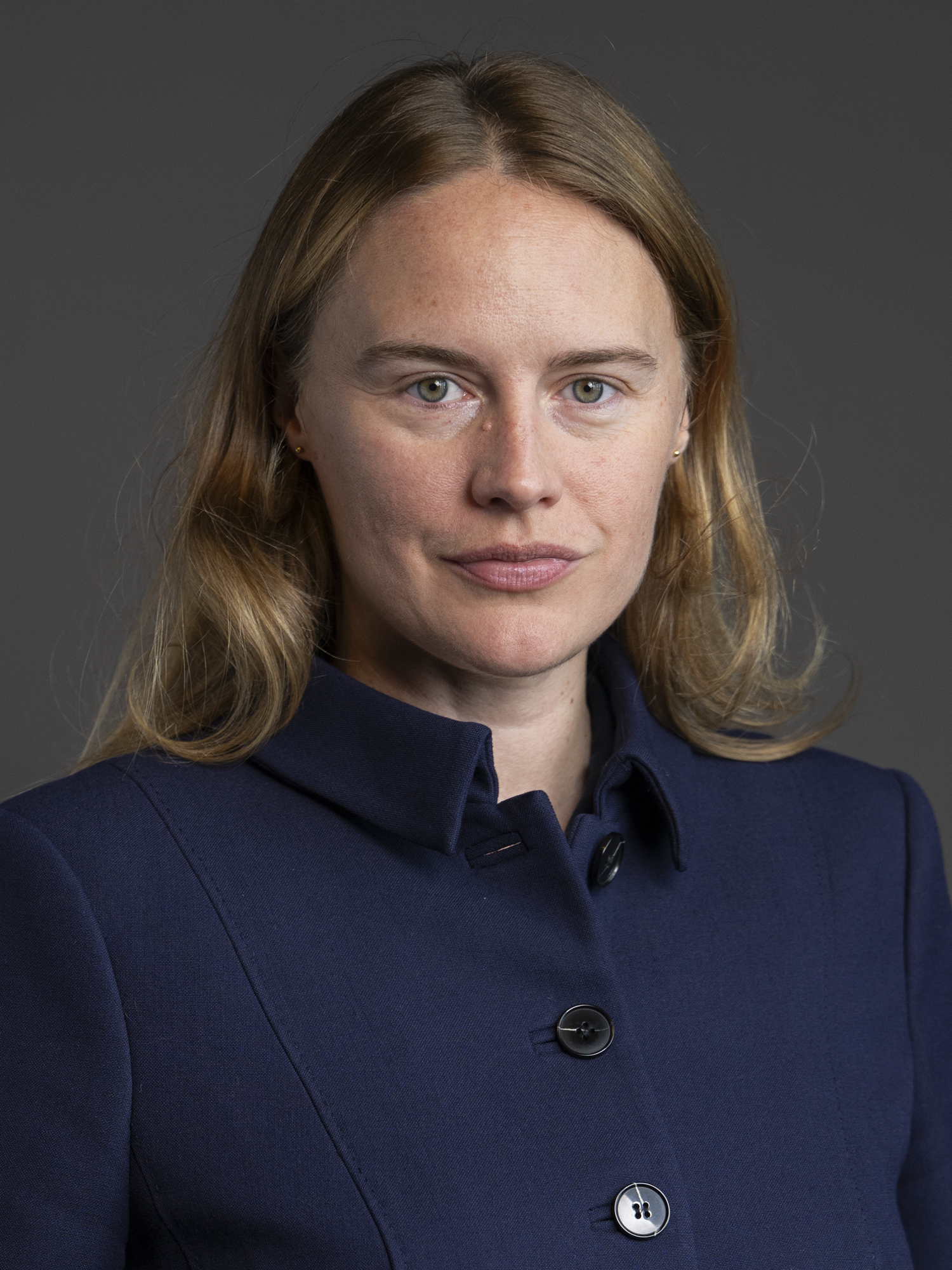
- Official portrait, 2024

Member of Parliament for South East Cornwall
- Incumbent
- Assumed office 4 July 2024
- Preceded by: Sheryll Murray
- Majority: 1,911 (3.9%)

Personal details
- Born: Anna Preston Gelderd; 3 July 1986 (age 39) Leeds, UK
- Party: Labour

Anna Preston Gelderd (born 3 July 1986) is a British Labour Party politician who has been the Member of Parliament for South East Cornwall since 2024.

== Early life and career ==
Gelderd was educated at the University of Bristol and a masters degree from Murray Edwards College, Cambridge. Following graduation she worked as a parliamentary assistant to the Labour MP Tony Cunningham, and then as an advisor and advocacy professional for Oxfam, the Royal National Lifeboat Institution (RNLI) and the Marine Conservation Society. Prior to being elected to Parliament, she was employed as a senior advisor to the non-profit ocean conservation group Oceana.

== Political career ==
Gelderd was elected as the Member of Parliament for South East Cornwall in July 2024, being the first Labour MP for this constituency.

Parliament of the United Kingdom
Preceded by Sheryll Murray	Member of Parliament for South East Cornwall; 2024–present	Incumbent
