= South East Cornwall =

UK Parliament constituency (since 1983)

Coordinates: 50.414°N 4.520°W

- County constituency for the House of Commons
- Interactive map of boundaries since 2024
- Boundary of South East Cornwall in Cornwall

- Location of Cornwall within England
- County: Cornwall
- Electorate: 72,654 (2024)
- Major settlements: Liskeard, Saltash, Lostwithiel and Callington

Current constituency
- Created: 1983
- Member of Parliament: Anna Gelderd (Labour)
- Seats: One
- Created from: Bodmin, Cornwall North and Truro

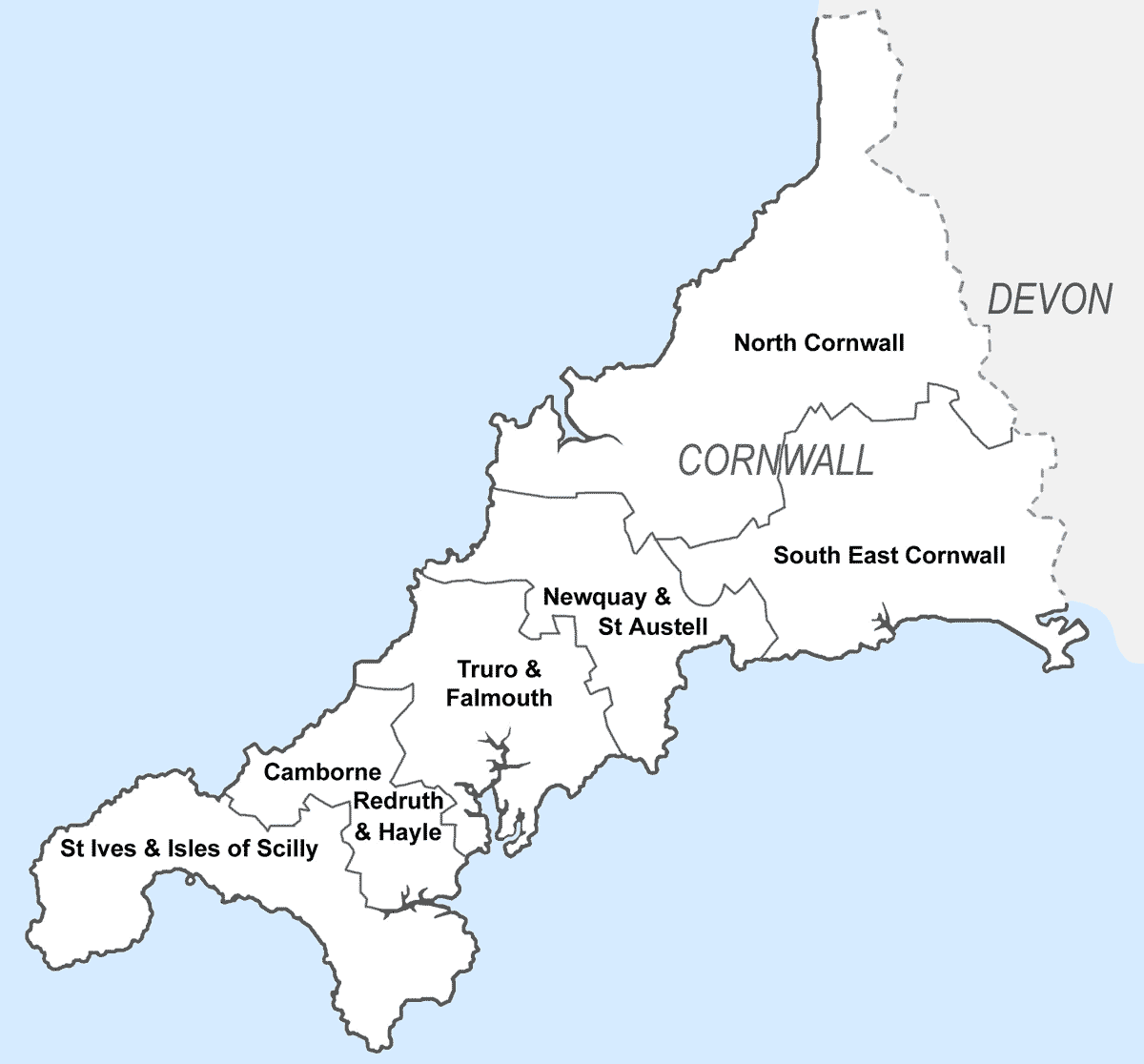
Sketchmap of 2010 parliamentary constituencies in Cornwall - click to enlarge

South East Cornwall is a constituency (Note: A county constituency (for the purposes of election expenses and type of returning officer)) represented in the House of Commons of the UK Parliament since 2024 by Anna Gelderd, a Labour politician. (Note: As with all constituencies, the constituency elects one Member of Parliament (MP) by the first past the post system of election at least every five years.)

== Constituency profile ==
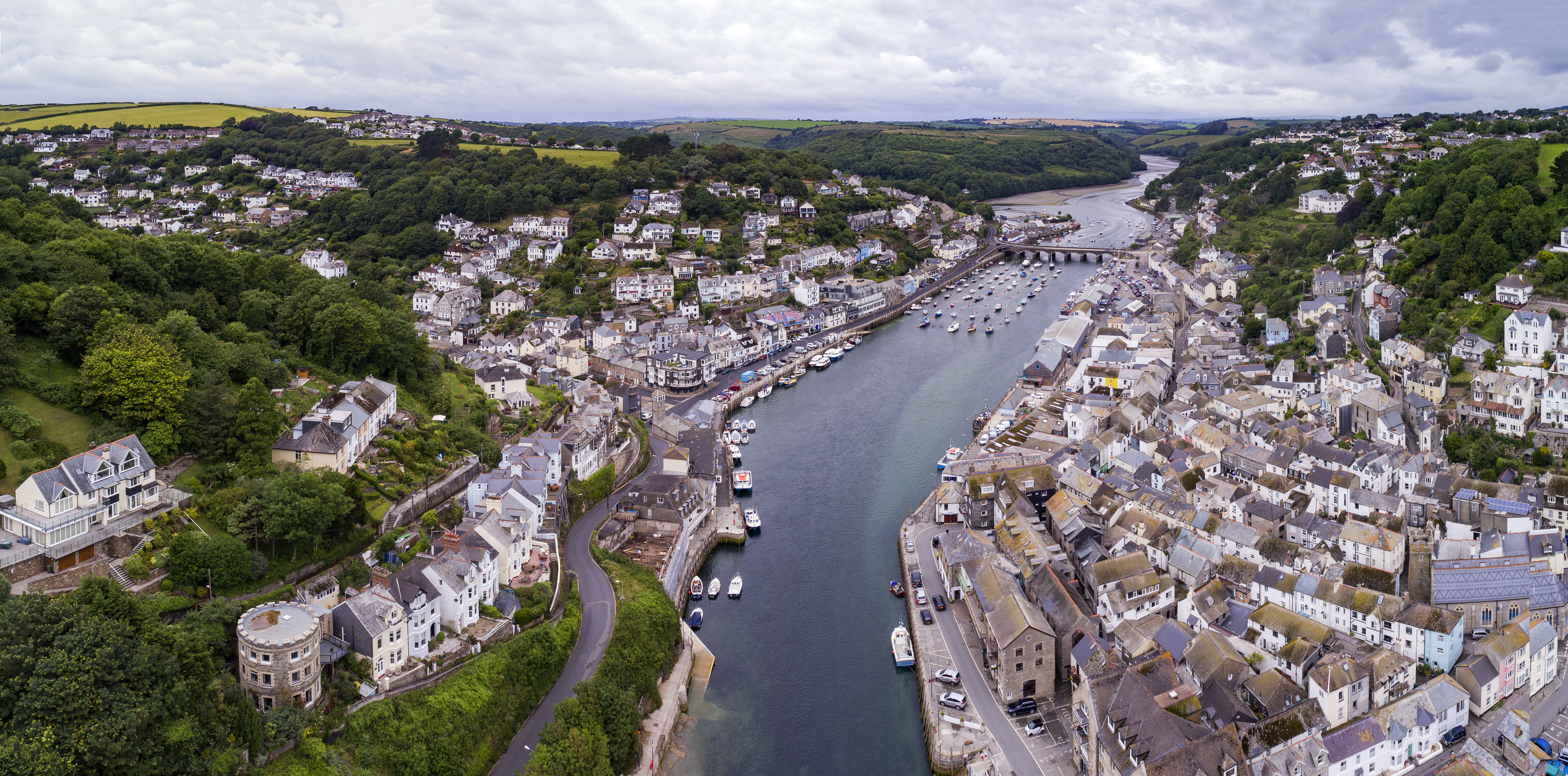
Looe

South East Cornwall is a constituency in Cornwall in South West England. Its largest town is Saltash, which has a population of around 15,000. Other settlements include the towns of Liskeard, Lostwithiel, Looe, Callington and Torpoint and the village of Gunnislake.

This is a large, rural constituency with many small towns and villages. The coastal settlements like Looe, Polperro and Downderry are traditionally fishing villages that have grown popular as tourist destinations. Liskeard, Lostwithiel and Callington are historic, small market towns. Saltash and Torpoint lie across the River Tamar from the city of Plymouth; Saltash largely functions as a suburb of Plymouth despite being the older of the two settlements. Most of the towns and villages in this constituency have below-average levels of wealth whilst Saltash is more affluent. House prices here are generally lower than the regional and UK averages.

South East Cornwall has a large retired population and low proportions of young and middle-aged adults. Residents have below-average levels of income but high rates of homeownership. The child poverty rate is above average. They have average levels of education and a high proportion work in the agriculture, retail and tourism sectors. The percentage of residents claiming unemployment benefits is low. White people made up 98% of the population at the 2021 census and around 10% of residents expressed a Cornish national identity.

At the local council, Looe and Lostwithiel in the west are represented by Liberal Democrats whilst the rest of the constituency elected mostly Reform UK councillors. An estimated 57% of voters in South East Cornwall supported leaving the European Union in the 2016 referendum, higher than the UK-wide figure of 52%.

== Boundaries ==
Map of boundaries between 2010 and 2024

1983–2010: The District of Caradon, the Borough of Restormel wards of Fowey, Lostwithiel, St Blaise, and Tywardreath, and the District of North Cornwall ward of Stoke Climsland.

2010–2024: The District of Caradon, and the Borough of Restormel ward of Lostwithiel.

2024–present: Further to the 2023 Periodic Review of Westminster constituencies which became effective for the 2024 general election, the constituency is composed of the following electoral divisions of Cornwall (as they existed on 4 May 2021):

- Callington & St Dominic; Calstock; Liskeard Central; Liskeard South & Dobwalls; Looe East & Deviock; Looe West, Pelynt, Lansallos & Lanteglos; Lostwithiel & Lanreath; Lynher; Rame Peninsula & St Germans; St Cleer & Menheniot; Saltash Essa; Saltash Tamar; Saltash Trematon & Landrake; Torpoint.

Very small change to align with revised electoral division boundaries.

The current constituency territory contains the location of several former borough constituencies which were abolished as 'rotten boroughs' by the Reform Act 1832:

- Callington
- East Looe
- Fowey
- Lostwithiel
- Saltash
- St Germans
- West Looe and Polperro

== History ==
The predecessor county division, Bodmin, serving the area from 1885 until 1983 had (during those 98 years) 15 members (two of whom had broken terms of office serving the area), seeing twelve shifts of preference between the Liberal, Liberal Unionist and Conservative parties, spread quite broadly throughout that period. Consistent with this, since 1983 the preference for an MP has alternated between Liberal Democrats and Conservatives. The Labour Party moved into second place in 2017 for the first time in the history of both constituencies, and captured the seat at the 2024 general election.

== Members of Parliament ==
Election	Member	Party
1983	Robert Hicks	Conservative
1997	Colin Breed	Liberal Democrat
2010	Sheryll Murray	Conservative
2024	Anna Gelderd	Labour

== Elections ==
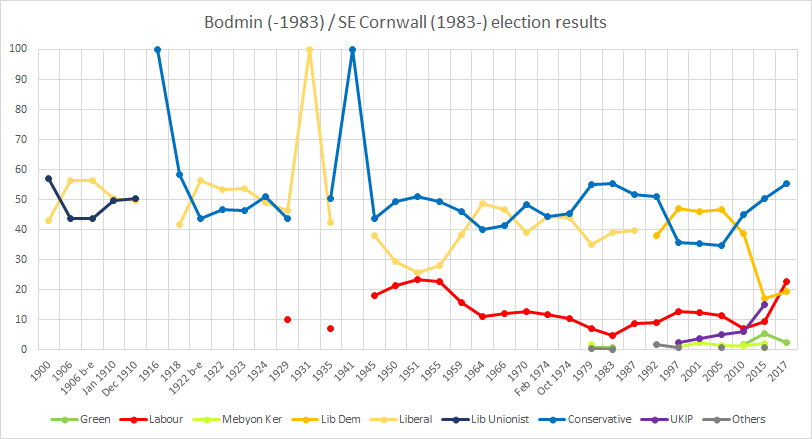
Bodmin // South East Cornwall election results

=== Elections in the 2020s ===
General election 2024: South East Cornwall
Party	Candidate	Votes	%	±%
Labour	Anna Gelderd	15,670	31.8	+11.5
Conservative	Sheryll Murray	13,759	27.9	–31.1
Reform	Paul Wadley	9,311	18.9	N/A
Liberal Democrats	Colin Martin	8,284	16.8	+0.5
Green	Martin Corney	1,999	4.1	+1.4
Heritage	Graham Cowdry	263	0.5	N/A
Majority		1,911	3.9	N/A
Turnout		49,286	67.8	–5.0
Registered electors		72,728		
Labour gain from Conservative		Swing	▲21.3	

=== Elections in the 2010s ===
2019 notional result
Party	Vote	%
Conservative	30,839	59.0
Labour	10,614	20.3
Liberal Democrats	8,520	16.3
Green	1,405	2.7
Others	869	1.7
Turnout	52,247	72.8
Electorate	71,734	

General election 2019: South East Cornwall
Party	Candidate	Votes	%	±%
Conservative	Sheryll Murray	31,807	59.3	+3.9
Labour	Gareth Derrick	10,836	20.2	−2.4
Liberal Democrats	Colin Martin	8,650	16.1	−3.3
Green	Martha Green	1,493	2.8	+0.3
Liberal	Jay Latham	869	1.6	N/A
Majority		20,971	39.1	+6.3
Turnout		53,655	74.7	+0.7
Conservative hold		Swing	+3.2	

General election 2017: South East Cornwall
Party	Candidate	Votes	%	±%
Conservative	Sheryll Murray	29,493	55.4	+4.9
Labour	Gareth Derrick	12,050	22.6	+13.3
Liberal Democrats	Phil Hutty	10,346	19.4	+2.5
Green	Martin Corney	1,335	2.5	−2.9
Majority		17,443	32.8	−0.8
Turnout		53,224	74.0	+2.9
Conservative hold		Swing	-4.2	

General election 2015: South East Cornwall
Party	Candidate	Votes	%	±%
Conservative	Sheryll Murray	25,516	50.5	+5.4
Liberal Democrats	Phil Hutty	8,521	16.9	−21.7
UKIP	Bradley Monk	7,698	15.2	+9.0
Labour	Declan Lloyd	4,692	9.3	+2.2
Green	Martin Corney	2,718	5.4	+3.7
Mebyon Kernow	Andrew Long	1,003	2.0	+0.7
Independent	George Trubody	350	0.7	N/A
Majority		16,995	33.6	+28.1
Turnout		50,498	71.1	+2.4
Conservative hold		Swing	+13.6	

General election 2010: South East Cornwall
Party	Candidate	Votes	%	±%
Conservative	Sheryll Murray	22,390	45.1	+10.1
Liberal Democrats	Karen Gillard	19,170	38.6	−8.1
Labour	Michael Sparling	3,507	7.1	−3.4
UKIP	Stephanie McWilliam	3,083	6.2	+1.1
Green	Roger Creagh-Osborne	826	1.7	N/A
Mebyon Kernow	Roger Holmes	641	1.3	−0.4
Majority		3,220	6.5	N/A
Turnout		49,617	68.7	+1.0
Conservative gain from Liberal Democrats		Swing	+9.1	

=== Elections in the 2000s ===
General election 2005: South East Cornwall
Party	Candidate	Votes	%	±%
Liberal Democrats	Colin Breed	24,986	46.7	+0.8
Conservative	Ashley Gray	18,479	34.6	−0.9
Labour	Colin Binley	6,069	11.4	−1.0
UKIP	David Lucas	2,693	5.0	+1.2
Mebyon Kernow	Graham Sandercock	769	1.4	−0.9
Veritas	Anne Assheton-Salton	459	0.9	N/A
Majority		6,507	12.1	+1.7
Turnout		53,455	66.2	+0.8
Liberal Democrats hold		Swing	+0.9	

General election 2001: South East Cornwall
Party	Candidate	Votes	%	±%
Liberal Democrats	Colin Breed	23,756	45.9	−1.2
Conservative	Ashley Gray	18,381	35.5	−0.3
Labour	William Stevens	6,429	12.4	−0.4
UKIP	Graham Palmer	1,978	3.8	+1.3
Mebyon Kernow	Kenneth George	1,209	2.3	+1.3
Majority		5,375	10.4	−0.9
Turnout		51,753	65.4	−10.3
Liberal Democrats hold		Swing	−0.5	

=== Elections in the 1990s ===
General election 1997: South East Cornwall
Party	Candidate	Votes	%	±%
Liberal Democrats	Colin Breed	27,044	47.1	+9.0
Conservative	Warwick Lightfoot	20,564	35.8	−15.1
Labour	Dorothy M. Kirk	7,358	12.8	+3.6
UKIP	James Wonnacott	1,428	2.5	N/A
Mebyon Kernow	Paul Dunbar	573	1.0	N/A
Liberal	Bill Weights	268	0.5	−0.6
Natural Law	Margot Hartley	197	0.3	0.0
Majority		6,480	11.3	N/A
Turnout		57,432	75.7	−6.4
Liberal Democrats gain from Conservative		Swing	+12.0	

General election 1992: South East Cornwall
Party	Candidate	Votes	%	±%
Conservative	Robert Hicks	30,565	51.0	−0.6
Liberal Democrats	Robin Teverson	22,861	38.1	−1.6
Labour Co-op	Linda Gilroy	5,536	9.2	+0.5
Liberal	Maureen Cook	644	1.1	N/A
Anti-Federalist League	Anthony Quick	227	0.4	N/A
Natural Law	Rosaleen Allen	155	0.3	N/A
Majority		7,704	12.9	+1.0
Turnout		59,988	82.1	+2.6
Conservative hold		Swing	+0.5	

=== Elections in the 1980s ===
General election 1987: South East Cornwall
Party	Candidate	Votes	%	±%
Conservative	Robert Hicks	28,818	51.6	−3.7
Liberal	Ian Tunbridge	22,211	39.7	+0.8
Labour	Paul Clark	4,847	8.7	+3.8
Majority		6,607	11.9	−4.5
Turnout		55.876	79.5	+0.9
Conservative hold		Swing	−2.3	

General election 1983: South East Cornwall
Party	Candidate	Votes	%	±%
Conservative	Robert Hicks	28,326	55.3	
Liberal	David Blunt	19,972	38.9	
Labour	Andrew Bebb	2,507	4.9	
Ecology	John Chadwick	337	0.7	
Independent	Joy Dent	94	0.2	
Majority		8,354	16.4	
Turnout		51,236	78.6	
Conservative win (new seat)				

== See also ==
- List of parliamentary constituencies in Cornwall
- Forgotten Corner of Cornwall
- Wivelshire
