= Gilbert Michell =

16th-century English politician

Gilbert Michell (c. 1557 – 28 March 1614), of Bodmin, Cornwall, was an English politician.

He was a member (MP) of the parliament of England for Bodmin in 1584–85.
