= Richard Allet =

English politician

Richard Allet (fl. 1387–1423) was an English politician. He sat as MP for Bodmin in 1406 and Launceston in 1423.
