= Trott =

Trott is a surname. Notable people with the name include:

- Abby Trott, American voice actress
- Albert Trott (1873–1914), Australian-born Test cricketer for both Australia and England
- Benjamin Trott (born 1977), American blogger and businessman
- Christopher Trott (born 1988), English YouTuber and musician
- Dave Trott (advertising executive), British copywriter and author
- Dave Trott (politician) (born 1960), American attorney and politician
- Emma Trott (born 1989), British road and track cyclist
- Harry Trott (1866–1917), Australian Test cricketer
- Jonathan Trott (born 1981), English cricketer
- Josephine Trott (1874–1950), American author and composer
- Laura Trott (born 1992), British track cyclist
- Mena Grabowski Trott (born 1977), American blogger and businesswoman
- Novella Jewell Trott (1846–1929), American author and editor
- Stephen S. Trott (born 1939), American judge
- Stuart Trott (born 1948), Australian rules footballer
- Thomas Trott (1483–1524?), English politician
