= Samuel Thomas Spry =

English Whig politician

Samuel Thomas Spry (25 July 1804 – 29 June 1868) was an English Whig politician who sat in the House of Commons from 1832 to 1841 and who changed party and sat for four years again as a Conservative from 1843.

Spry was the son of Admiral Thomas Davy, who changed his name to Spry, and his wife Anna-Maria Thomas. He was a member of the Spry family of Place and Tregolls Cornwall.

At the 1832 general election Spry was elected Member of Parliament (MP) for Bodmin. He held the seat until 1841. He was sworn in again in 1843 when, as reported in Hansard, alongside 8 other parliamentarians he presented a petition for reducing the number of pubs.

Spry was a J.P., Deputy Lieutenant and Deputy Warden of the Stannaries, and was High Sheriff of Cornwall in 1849.

Spry died at the age of 63.

Parliament of the United Kingdom
Preceded by Davies Giddy; Horace Seymour	Member of Parliament for Bodmin; 1832–1841; With: William Peter 1832–35; Charles Vivian from 1835	Succeeded by Charles Vivian; John Dunn-Gardner
Preceded by Charles Vivian; John Dunn-Gardner	Member of Parliament for Bodmin; 1843–1847; With: John Dunn-Gardner	Succeeded by James Wyld; Henry Charles Lacy
