= John But =

15th-century English politician

John But or Butte (fl. 1402–1425), of St Gennys, Cornwall was an English politician.

He was a Member (MP) of the Parliament of England for Barnstaple in 1402, for Bodmin in May 1413 and November 1414, for Liskeard in 1417 and for Truro 1422 and 1425.
