= Paul Tyler =

British politician

The Right Honourable The Lord Tyler CBE PC DL
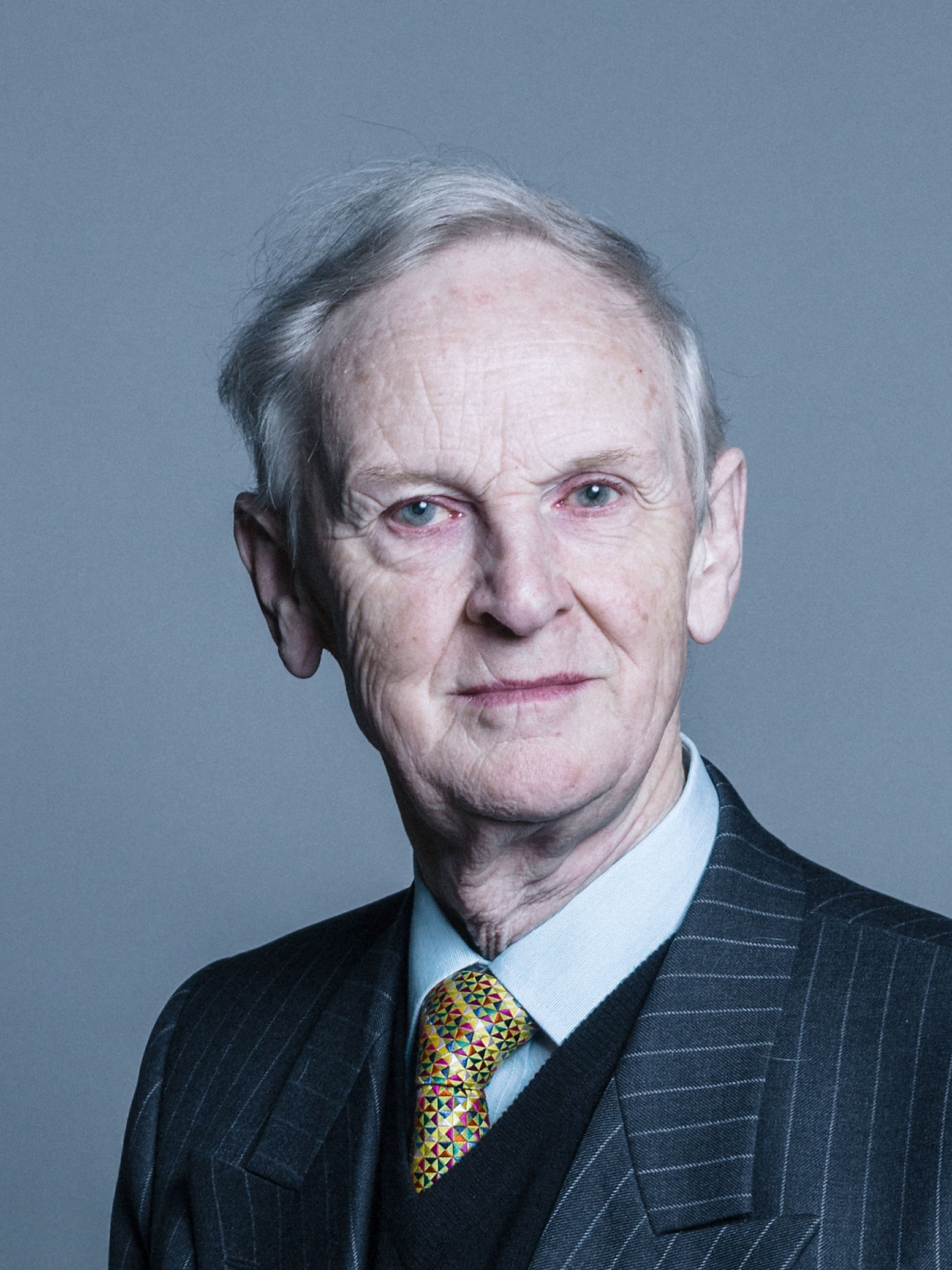

Member of the House of Lords
- Lord Temporal
- Life peerage 15 June 2005 – 28 October 2021

Chief Whip of the Liberal Democrats
- In office 1 May 1997 – 7 June 2001
- Leader: Paddy Ashdown; Charles Kennedy
- Preceded by: Archy Kirkwood
- Succeeded by: Andrew Stunell

Chairman of the Liberal Party
- In office 1983–1986
- Leader: David Steel
- Preceded by: Geoff Tordoff
- Succeeded by: Timothy Clement-Jones

Member of Parliament
- In office 9 April 1992 – 11 April 2005
- Preceded by: Gerry Neale
- Succeeded by: Dan Rogerson
- Constituency: North Cornwall
- In office 28 February 1974 – 20 September 1974
- Preceded by: Robert Hicks
- Succeeded by: Robert Hicks
- Constituency: Bodmin

Personal details
- Born: 29 October 1941 (age 84) South Devon, England
- Party: Liberal Democrat
- Other political affiliations: Liberal
- Education: Exeter College, Oxford
- Occupation: Politician
- Website: http://www.paultyler.libdems.org

Paul Archer Tyler, Baron Tyler (born 29 October 1941) is a Liberal Democrat politician in the United Kingdom. He was the Member of Parliament (MP) for Bodmin from February to October 1974 and for North Cornwall from 1992 to 2005, and sat in the House of Lords as a life peer until October 2021.

== Education ==
Tyler was privately educated at the independent Sherborne School and Exeter College, Oxford.

== Elections ==
In 1964 Tyler was elected Britain's youngest County Councillor, and re-elected in 1967. He was vice-chairman of the Dartmoor National Park Committee and a member of the Devon & Cornwall Police Authority.

His first Parliamentary candidacy was for Totnes at the 1966 general election, when he came third.

At the 1970 general election, Tyler stood as the Liberal candidate in the Bodmin constituency, defending the seat held by the outgoing Liberal MP Peter Bessell. However, he lost to the Conservative candidate Robert Hicks.

At the February 1974 general election, Tyler defeated Hicks by a majority of only nine votes. At the October election that year, Tyler increased his vote, but not sufficiently to withstand the swing, and Hicks regained the seat with a majority of 665. Tyler stood again at the 1979 general election, but Hicks was re-elected with a large majority, in line with the national swing away from the Liberals and Labour to the Conservatives.

He contested the 1982 Beaconsfield by-election, increasing the Alliance vote and pushing the Labour candidate (Tony Blair) into third place. Tyler did not contest the general elections in 1983 and 1987, but was David Steel's campaign organiser in 1983, and was subsequently elected Chairman of the Liberal Party 1983–6; he was appointed a Commander of the Order of the British Empire (CBE) in the 1985 Birthday Honours. In addition to his role as Campaign Adviser to Steel, he was a member of the Alliance Planning Group 1986–87, and the Campaign Team led by John Pardoe in the 1987 general election.

He was the Liberal Democrat candidate for Cornwall and Plymouth in the 1989 European Parliament election. He reduced the Conservative majority to 8.7%, cut the Labour share of the vote and gained 68,559 votes – the highest ever Liberal or Liberal Democrat vote at the time and the best result in the whole UK.

After an 18-year absence, he returned to Parliament at the 1992 general election, when he was elected as Liberal Democrat Member for North Cornwall, defeating the Conservative incumbent Gerry Neale, who had defeated John Pardoe in 1979. He was a member of the Liberal Democrats' shadow cabinet until he retired from the House of Commons at the May 2005 general election. Dan Rogerson was selected by the local Liberal Democrats to succeed him, and held the seat by a majority of 3,176.

== Commons career ==
Tyler was appointed Liberal Democrat Spokesman on Rural Affairs, Agriculture and Transport following his election 1992. In 1994/95 he also piloted a review of Transport policy. He gained the Country Life Parliamentarian of the Year Award for his persistent and effective challenging of Agriculture Ministers during the BSE Beef crisis.

Following the 1997 election he was elected Chief Whip by the newly enlarged Liberal Democrat Parliamentary Party. He served on the Modernisation Select Committee, and led Liberal Democrat efforts to make the Commons more effective. As the Foot and Mouth epidemic devastated livestock areas, Party Leader Charles Kennedy appointed Tyler to co-ordinate the response, and work with farming and other organisations, to seek more effective Government action.

Following the 2001 election he was appointed to shadow Robin Cook, Leader of the House of Commons, with particular responsibility for the reform of Parliament. He led for the party on both the modernisation of the Commons and the reform of the Lords to create a democratic and representative Second Chamber. In 2003 he convened a cross-party group (with Ken Clarke, Robin Cook, Tony Wright and Sir George Young) to examine proposals for Lords reform and publish a draft Bill ("Reforming the House of Lords - Breaking the Deadlock")

== Peerage ==
On 13 May 2005 it was announced that Tyler would be created a life peer, and on 15 June 2005 he was created Baron Tyler, of Linkinhorne, in the County of Cornwall. He was appointed a Deputy Lieutenant of Cornwall in February 2006. In March 2014, he was sworn of the Privy Council.

== Role in the House of Lords ==
Tyler chaired the Liberal Democrats' "Better Governance" policy group 2006–07 and piloted its report, "For the people, by the people", through the Liberal Democrat Conference of September 2007. His Constitutional Renewal Bill was introduced in the House of Lords in 2009.

He was co-chair of the Liberal Democrat Parliamentary Party Committee on Political & Constitutional Reform 2005–21. He has worked with allies in all Parties, and in both Houses, to advance the cause of constitutional reform. He convened a cross-party group from within the Joint Committee on the Draft House of Lords Reform Bill to secure majority support for positive recommendations in favour of progress with reform. . With colleagues from other parties, Tyler has contributed extensively to media coverage of this issue. He co-authored a pamphlet "Lords Reform – A Guide for MPs" with other pro-reform parliamentarians, before the Bill received a large majority at second reading in the House of Commons in July 2012.

Following the Committee on Standards in Public Life report on "Political Party Finance" in 2011 he led a cross-party group to prepare a draft Bill to follow up its recommendations ("Funding Democracy" - 2013).

He retired from the House of Lords in October 2021, a week before his 80th birthday, making a widely acclaimed "valedictory speech", fully assessing the constitutional challenges presented by the Johnson Government.

== Campaigns ==
In 2006 Lord Tyler called on Planning Minister, Yvette Cooper to honour the pledges and position of her predecessor, Keith Hill, to keep the Cornish Saint Piran's Flag flying across the Cornwall When he was MP for North Cornwall, Tyler led a successful campaign, backed by the local media, to gain reassurances from the Planning Minister that rules which prevent the St Piran's flag flying without permission could be ignored by local Councils.

In 2007 Lord Tyler confirmed his support for a Cornish Assembly when he was interviewed by the BBC regarding proposals for a Constitutional Convention.

Between 1992 and 2005, he was Chair of the All-Party Parliamentary Group on Organophosphates (OPs), and campaigned about their adverse effects on farmers (through sheep dip), pilots and cabin crew (through contaminated cabin air) and Gulf War veterans (through pesticides used to repel insects). He also led a campaign to uncover the truth behind the Lowermoor Water Poisoning incident, and the ensuing cover-up, which occurred shortly before the Conservative Party privatised the water industry.

In 2004, Tyler started a campaign to stop government departments and agencies making citizens access their services via high-rate “0870” phone numbers. He exposed the Driver & Vehicle Licensing Agency for raking in over £1m a year in “revenue sharing” arrangements with telephone companies, where callers paid over the odds while waiting to book driving tests and sort out tax discs. The campaign culminated in the creation of “03” low-rate numbers, especially for public services.

For a comprehensive analysis of current challenges to Britain's constitutional conventions see Lord Tyler's article for the Financial Times dated 16 January 2021 at ft.com/3qoFr0k.

With his wife Nicky (whose original idea inspired the initiative) and colleague Lord Oates he worked with the Global Alliance for Vaccination and Immunisation (GAVI) to provide Covid vaccines to lower income countries. The resulting donations from UK residents to the GAVI/COVAX programme totalled more than £450,000 in the spring of 2021.

Following the publication of "Can Parliament Take Back Control?" with Sir Nick Harvey in 2023 he worked with Unlock Democracy to incorporate its recommendations, together with others, in a draft consultative paper ("Democratic Integrity White Paper" - 2024).

Experience working the Royal Institute of British Architects (1966–73) and Shelter (1975–76) has given Tyler a special interest in housing and planning policy. He was managing director of the Cornwall Courier local newspaper group, 1976–81, a frequent contributor to a wide range of media, and presenter of BBC South West TV Discovery series in 1978. He was a Senior Consultant responsible for political and public issue assignments at Good Relations 1982–92 (for, amongst others, the Countryside Commission, European Year of the Environment and Rural Development Commission).

== Publications ==
In 2014, Lord Tyler published Who Decides? Combining insightful analysis with a series of stories about his time representing Cornwall, the book draws on the work of former Government Chief Psychologist Edgar Anstey and on the illustrations by Norman Thelwell to his 1962 publication Committees: How they work and how to work them. In 2023 He published - with Nick Harvey, former North Devon MP and Coalition Government Minister - "Can Parliament Take Back Control? - Britain's Elective Dictatorship in the Johnson Aftermath".

Parliament of the United Kingdom
Preceded by Robert Hicks	Member of Parliament for Bodmin; February 1974–October 1974	Succeeded by Robert Hicks
Preceded by Gerry Neale	Member of Parliament for North Cornwall; 1992–2005	Succeeded by Dan Rogerson
Party political offices
Preceded by Joyce Rose	Chairman of the Liberal Party; 1984–1986	Succeeded by Timothy Clement-Jones
Preceded by Archy Kirkwood	Chief Whip of the Liberal Democrats; 1997–2001	Succeeded by Andrew Stunell
Orders of precedence in the United Kingdom
Preceded by The Lord Kirkwood of Kirkhope	Gentlemen; Baron Tyler	Followed by The Lord Foulkes of Cumnock
