= John Dunn-Gardner =

British politician

Arms of Gardener of Chatteris House, Isle of Ely, Cambridgeshire: Argent, on a saltire between three griffin's heads erased one in chief two in fess sable and a woolpack in base azure another saltire or

Coat of arms of John Dunn-Gardner on tiled floor the choir of Ely Cathedral, Cambridgeshire, as one of the benefactors to the restoration of the Cathedral. Gardener quartering Dunn impaling Lawson

John Dunn-Gardner (20 July 1811 – 11 January 1903), of Soham Mere and of Chatteris House, Isle of Ely, in Cambridgeshire (born as John Margetts, known as John Townshend from 1823 to 1843 and styled by the courtesy title Earl of Leicester from 1823 to 1843, known as John Dunn-Gardner from 1843 to death), was a British politician and landowner. From his birth until his de-legitimization in 1843, he was the eldest legal son and heir apparent of George Townshend, 3rd Marquess Townshend (1778-1855), who was not, however, his biological father. He is otherwise notable in relation to the tangled marital history of his mother, the Marchioness Townshend.

== Origins ==
He was born on 20 July 1811 as "John Margetts", the eldest surviving natural son of John Margetts, a brewer from St Ives, by his mistress (or bigamous wife) Sarah Dunn-Gardner (d. 1858), (Marchioness Townshend), wife of George Townshend, 3rd Marquess Townshend (1778-1855), and only surviving daughter and heiress of William Dunn-Gardner (d. 1831) of Chatteris House, Isle of Ely, Cambridgeshire. By law, until his de-legitimization in 1843, he was deemed the eldest son and heir of 3rd Marquess Townshend, as his mother's marriage was never annulled. On 26 December 1823, when aged 12, his mother had him baptised with the name "John Townshend" at St. George's, Bloomsbury, and he adopted the use of the courtesy title Earl of Leicester, his legal father's subsidiary title. However, all the children borne to his mother during her marriage were declared illegitimate by a private act of Parliament, the Townshend Peerage Act 1843 (6 & 7 Vict. c. 35 Pr.), whereupon John assumed as his surname his mother's maiden name of Dunn-Gardner.

== Career ==
He was a Conservative member of parliament for Bodmin from 1841 to 1847, and served as a Justice of the Peace, a deputy lieutenant, and as High Sheriff of Cambridgeshire and Huntingdonshire in 1859. In 1872, having inherited his maternal estates, John Dunn-Gardner was the sixth largest landowner in Cambridgeshire, ranking after the Earl of Hardwicke, the Duke of Bedford, John Walbanke Childers MP, the Duke of Rutland and William Hall. He was the second largest landowner to be resident principally in Cambridgeshire, and owned 3,676 acres (14.88 km^{2}), or about 0.7% of all land in that county.

== Sarah, Marchioness Townshend ==
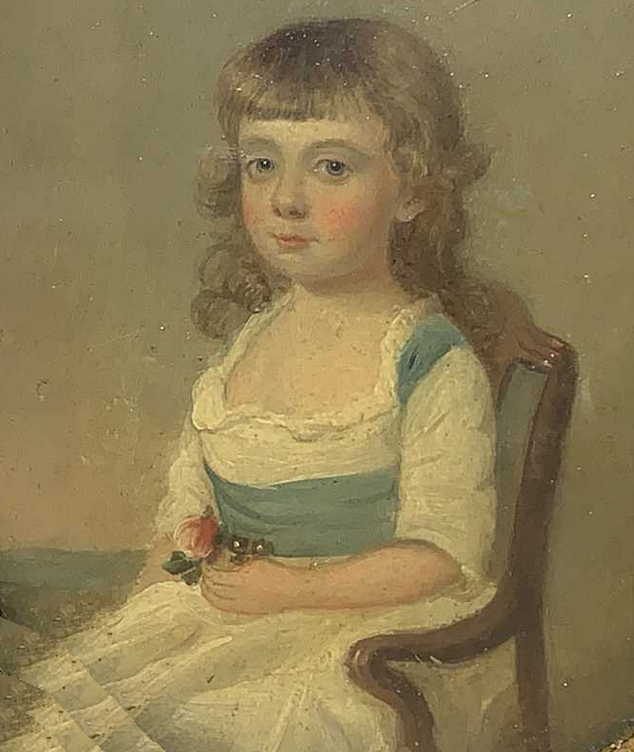
Sarah Dunn-Gardner (MarchionessTownshend), as a child

Sarah and her husband married on 12 May 1807, and were known as Lord and Lady Chartley, a courtesy title from his grandfather, the 1st Marquess Townshend. In September 1807, on the death of the 1st Marquess, the couple became the Earl and Countess of Leicester, also a courtesy title. They separated a few months later, in May 1808, without having produced an issue, and she filed an ecclesiastical suit for annulment, alleging non-consummation of the marriage, i.e. that the couple had never had sex. While the suit was still pending, Lady Leicester eloped with John Margetts, a brewer, and married him in a bigamous ceremony at Gretna Green in October 1809. They had several children. Her first marriage was never dissolved, which became a legal problem for the succession of the Townshend peerages. In 1811 her legal husband became the 3rd Marquess Townshend, but after leaving him, she did not use his name for over a decade, calling herself Mrs. Margetts; and Margetts gave his surname to their children. Sarah survived both men: Margetts died in 1842, and Marquess Townshend died abroad in December 1855. She remarried a few weeks after her legal widowhood, to James Laidler on 10 January 1856, and died on 11 September 1858.

=== Settling of Dunn-Gardner estate in 1831 ===
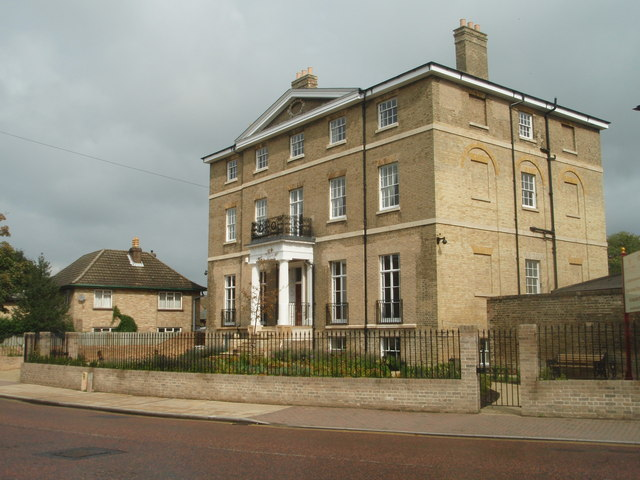
Chatteris House, Isle of Ely, Cambridgeshire

In August 1831 (three months before his death) Sarah's father William Dunn-Gardner (formerly "William Dunn") of Chatteris House, Isle of Ely, Cambridgeshire, bequeathed the estate of Soham Mere, bought with the funds he had settled on his daughter and her husband, to his eldest natural grandson then known as "John Townshend" (later John Dunn-Gardner), described in 1863 as a stranger in blood under the law. However, at the time (1831), John was his legitimate grandson, as he was born to his daughter within wedlock (albeit not fathered by her husband). William Dunn-Gardner apparently bequeathed the estate by name to ensure that his grandson would not be disinherited by any future legal steps taken by the Townshend family, which in fact happened in 1842.

Soham Mere was given to John's younger brother William Dunn-Gardner, of Fordham Abbey (purchased by William Dunn-Gardner in 1808), and descended in the family until 1974 when it was sold to the present owner.

=== De-legitimization in 1843 ===
Sarah, Lady Townshend, and John Margetts had several children besides John who bore the surname "Margetts" until 26 December 1823, when there was a wholesale christening under the surname "Townshend", but they were all declared illegitimate by a private act of Parliament, the Townshend Peerage Act 1843 (6 & 7 Vict. c. 35 Pr.), passed at the request of the Townsend family. (One child, being a minor and having no legal guardian, was exempted from the act's provisions, but was similarly excluded from succession to the peerage by a second private bill as soon as he came of age.) John himself was at the time a member of parliament, and after the passing of the Act he assumed his mother's surname of Dunn-Gardner.

== Dunn-Gardner family ==
The Dunn-Gardner family was descended from William Dunn-Gardner (d.1831) (born "William Dunn") and his wife the heiress Jane Gardner (d.1839), who married in 1783 and had only one surviving daughter and heiress, Sarah Dunn-Gardner (Marchioness Townshend). Jane Gardner was herself the only surviving child and heir of John Gardner (d. 1804) of Chatteris House who married his cousin, the daughter and heiress of John Marriott of Chatteris House by his wife, Barbara Johnstone, sister of his mother. When John Gardner died in 1804, his son-in-law William Dunn was obliged under the will to change his name to Dunn-Gardner to inherit Chatteris House and the other Gardner estates. Burke's Peerage states that the grandson "John Townshend" / John Dunn-Gardner inherited Chatteris in 1839, after his maternal grandmother Jane Gardner had died in that year.

Although A Genealogical and Heraldic Dictionary of the Landed Gentry of Great Britain (1862) fails to mention Mr Dunn-Gardner's parentage (as the eldest natural son of the brewer John Margetts and his bigamous spouse Sarah Dunn-Gardner (Marchioness Townshend), it mentions that he had two surviving brothers (William and Cecil) and two sisters. The "Townshend Peerage Case" gives details of all the children fathered by John Margetts:

1. a son (b. January 1810, died shortly afterwards)
2. John Margetts, later John Dunn Gardner, above (b. July 1811), born and known as John Margetts and so enrolled in school although styling himself Earl of Leicester, but christened December 1823 (with his other siblings) with the surname of Townshends, and then assumed the style of Earl of Leicester until 1843.
3. William Dunn-Gardner, of Fordham Abbey, near Newmarket, Cambridgeshire, JP (23 June 1812 – 1879), known as Lord William Townshend from 26 December 1823 until 1843 (as the alleged second surviving son of the 3rd Marquess Townshend), when he and his siblings were declared illegitimate by a private act of Parliament, the Townshend Peerage Act 1843 (6 & 7 Vict. c. 35 Pr.). He inherited the Fordham Abbey estate from his maternal grandfather, but came into possession only in 1839 when his maternal grandmother died, and was at first an unpopular landlord. He married Angelina Wainwright (d. 1923), by whom he had one surviving son and heir Cyril.
  3.1. Cyril Dunn-Gardner, of Fordham Abbey (d. 1911). Cyril was of age in 1895, and owned about 1,570 acres (6.4 km^{2}) in Fordham in 1910. He died without issue in 1911, leaving a life interest in the Abbey estate to his mother and former guardian, who died 1923, as above. The Fordham Abbey estate then passed in 1923 to Algernon Charles Wyndham Dunn Gardner (d. 1929), apparently by then the next heir male. (The estate fell to about 1,140 acres (4.6 km^{2}) by his death).
4. Rosa-Jane Dunn-Gardner (born 2 January 1814, or June 1815 per Townshend Peerage Case), used the name of Lady Rosa Jane Townshend December 1823 – 1843, wife of Charles Mottram by 1842.
5. Frederick Thomas Margetts (born 3 July 1816) who died in infancy according to the Townshend Peerage Case.
6. Lavinia-Charlotte-Sarah Dunn-Gardner (b. 5 June 1820), known as Lady Lavinia Charlotte Sarah Townshend from December 1823 to 1843.
7. Cecil Mina Bolivar Dunn-Gardner (born 1825, d.1903), formerly of the 13th Light Dragoons, known as Lord Cecil Townshend from birth to age 21 (a second private act of Parliament forbidding him to use that name and style, the Townshend Peerage Act 1847 (10 & 11 Vict. c. 37 Pr.), was then passed). His death is recorded, 7 September 1903. This Cecil Dunn-Gardner was the father of two sons, Robert Cecil, born 18 Sep. 1868, Francis Cyril, bapt. 2 Aug. 1872 (both unmarried) and four daughters – (Lucy) Cecilia or Cissie, Maude, Violet, and Flora:
  6.1. Robert Cecil Dunn-Gardner (b. 18 Sep 1868) unmarried
  6.2. Francis Cyril Dunn-Gardner (bapt. 2 August 1872)
  7.3. (Lucy) Cecilia Dunn-Gardner, or Cissie (d. 24 November 1931), who married 1stly in 1887 Col. Robert Ashton (1848–1898) by whom she had one son and one daughter (Dorothy, later Duchess of Wellington), and 2ndly in 1899 the 10th Earl of Scarbrough (16 November 1857 – 4 March 1945), by whom she had an only daughter. According to her daughter's obituary (2000), the Countess was not a devoted mother because she ignored her daughters, but she was also known for her work in the hospital of the Order of St John (as a Dame of Grace of the Order)
  7.4. Violet Dunn Gardner, the artist.
  7.5. Maude Dunn Gardner, aged 15 in 1881 (born circa 1865)
  7.6. Flora Dunn Gardner, who had issue.

== Marriages and children ==
John Dunn-Gardner married twice:

- Firstly, in 1847, to Mary Lawson (d. 13 April 1851), elder daughter of Andrew Lawson, of Boro Bridge, Boroughbridge, Yorkshire, MP for Knaresborough, and granddaughter on her maternal side of Sir Thomas Gooch, 4th Baronet, of Benacre in Suffolk. By her, he had issue, one son and one daughter:
  - Arthur Andrew Cecil Dunn-Gardner, J.P. (8 January 1851 – 28 July 1902), who was educated at Eton and Balliol College, Oxford, and was called to the Bar. His obituary states that he 'devoted his life to the interest of others', and he was involved with the Society for the Relief of Distress and the Charity Organization Society. He was apparently also a notable book collector like his father. He married 1890 Rose Lawrie, daughter of Andrew Lawrie. She was apparently the Rose Dunn-Gardner, who was active in 1895 in the Society for Organising Charitable Relief and Repressing Mendicity (formed 1869), known later as Charity Organisation Society (COS).
  - Mary Marianne Mariana, later Mrs William Robinson (b. 1848–1850) md 1870 her stepmother's brother (Christopher) William Robinson (23 January 1830 – 23 June 1889), of Dullingham House, Newmarket, co Cambridge (the house formerly owned or rented by her stepmother's father) and Denston Hall, co. Suffolk; he was son of William Pigott, Esq., of Dullingham House, Newmarket, co Cambridge (see above) by his wife Harriet Jeaffreson. He changed his name twice from Pigott to Jeaffreson to inherit Dullingham House under the terms of his grandfather's will, and then again to Robinson to inherit Denston Hall, Suffolk, from another relative. He died 23 June 1889, apparently leaving no issue.
- Secondly, in 1853, he married Ada Piggott, daughter of William Pigott of Dullingham House, Newmarket, Cambridgeshire, son of Sir George Pigott, Baronet, of Knapton, Queen's County. By his second wife, he had further issue, a son and a daughter:
  - Algernon Charles Wyndham Dunn-Gardner, of Denston Hall, co Suffolk, and Chatteris (b. 12 December 1853; d. 1929); he married Harriet Compton of the Minstead family of that name, itself a branch of the Marquesses of Northampton. They had issue, one daughter
    - Miriam Dunn-Gardner (1905–1989), married by 1934 to Harvey Cliff Leader (1893–1972), a racehorse trainer at Newmarket. She sold her manorial rights in Fordham Abbey in 1972. The Abbey itself with about 245 acres (0.99 km^{2}) remaining mostly parkland, was sold between 1933 and 1937.
  - Ada Marietta Dunn-Gardner (1856–1918).

== Death ==
Dunn-Gardner died on 11 January 1903, when resident at 37 Grosvenor Place, London.

== Sources ==
- Burke, Bernard. A Genealogical and Heraldic Dictionary of the Landed Gentry of Great Britain (1862). See pp. 531–532 for "Dunn-Gardner of Chatteris House".
- Cokayne, George Edward, ed. (1896). "Marquess Townshend". Complete Peerage. 7: 148.
- Lee, Sidney, ed. (1899). "Townshend, George (1755-1811)" . Dictionary of National Biography. Vol. 57. London: Smith, Elder & Co.
- 'Soham: Manors', A History of the County of Cambridge and the Isle of Ely: Volume 10: Cheveley, Flendish, Staine and Staploe Hundreds (north-eastern Cambridgeshire) (2002), pp. 500–507. URL: http://www.british-history.ac.uk/report.aspx?compid=18960. Date accessed: 28 December 2007.
- Obituary: Lady Serena James The Telegraph 23 August 2001.
- "Minutes of Evidence Taken upon the Second Reading of the Bill, Intituled 'An Act to declare the Illegitimacy of certain Persons alleged or claiming to be Children of The Most Honorable George Ferrars Marquis Townshend.'". Sessional Papers of the House of Lords in the Session 1843: Evidence Before Lords Committees for Privileges, Before the House and Open Committees on Bills, &c. XIX: 307, 1–194 (cases paginated individually). 3 May 1843.
- Clark, C.; W. Finnelly (1845). "The Townshend Peerage". Reports of Cases Decided in the House of Lords on Appeals and Writs of Error, and Claims of Peerage, During the Sessions 1843 & 1844. X: 289–318.
- Rayment, Leigh. Leigh Rayment's Peerage Page

Parliament of the United Kingdom
Preceded by Samuel Thomas Spry; Charles Vivian	Member of Parliament for Bodmin; 1841–1847; With: Charles Vivian 1841–1843; Sir Samuel Thomas Spry 1843–1847	Succeeded by James Wyld; Henry Charles Lacy
