= Peter Bessell =

British Liberal Party politician

Member of Parliament for Bodmin
- In office 15 October 1964 – 18 June 1970
- Preceded by: Douglas Marshall
- Succeeded by: Robert Hicks

Personal details
- Born: Peter Joseph Bessell; 24 August 1921 Bath, Somerset, U.K.
- Died: 27 November 1985 (aged 64) Oceanside, California, U.S.
- Party: Liberal
- Other political affiliations: Mebyon Kernow
- Spouses: Joyce Margaret Thomas; Pauline Colledge; Diane Miller
- Education: Lynwyd School

Peter Joseph Bessell (24 August 1921 – 27 November 1985) was a British Liberal Party politician, and Member of Parliament for Bodmin in Cornwall from 1964 to 1970.

== Early life ==
Peter Bessell was born at a nursing home in Bath, son of tailor Joseph Edgar Bessell and Olive Simons, née Hawkins. His parents divorced in 1926 and Bessell lived with his father. He was educated at Lynwyd School, Bath, and when his father died in 1940, Bessell took over the business. Bessell became a Congregational lay preacher in 1939, remaining so until 1970; on this basis he registered as a conscientious objector during the Second World War.

== Career ==
He first stood for parliament as a Liberal in Torquay in both the 1955 general election, and the by-election there later that year.

In the 1960s Peter Bessell was a member of Mebyon Kernow as well as the Liberal Party. At the 1959 general election, he was the Liberal candidate in the Bodmin constituency, but lost to the sitting Conservative MP Sir Douglas Marshall. He stood again at the 1964 general election, defeating Marshall with a majority of more than 3,000. He held the seat at the 1966 general election, despite a strong challenge from the Conservative John Gorst.

Bessell played a key role in the passage of the 1968 Transport Act that aimed to coordinate road, rail and waterway services.

Bessell did not contest the 1970 general election, when the Liberal candidate Paul Tyler lost Bodmin to the Conservative Robert Hicks.

In 1970, he opened a finance brokerage on Fifth Avenue in New York and continued this business, both in London and New York, until early 1974 when the businesses collapsed and, after briefly fleeing to Mexico to avoid his creditors, he moved to California. For most of the 1970s, Bessell was under threat of prosecution for fraud allegations relating to several of these companies, although he was subsequently successful in reaching agreement with all his creditors.

In order to appear at the 1979 Jeremy Thorpe trial in London, Bessell was offered and acquired immunity from prosecution for previous debts, although he offered to waive this.

He later lived in Oceanside, California with his wife, where he was involved in local politics.

== Thorpe affair ==
He was a prosecution witness at the trial of Liberal Party leader Jeremy Thorpe for the attempted murder of Norman Scott in 1979, the Thorpe affair, when he returned to Britain to testify in exchange for immunity from prosecution. His evidence was controversially referred to by the judge Mr Justice Cantley, in his summing up, as "a tissue of lies"; as a key meeting concerning the conspiracy to murder occurred in varied locations in his statements.

Bessell revealed under questioning that he had signed a contract with The Sunday Telegraph for the serialisation rights of his memoirs, and that his fee (£25,000) would double were Thorpe to be convicted. Before the trial he had been paid a third of the £50,000 full fee, and stood to gain only another £8,000 if Thorpe were to be acquitted. George Carman, Thorpe's lawyer, made much of this, and asked Bessell if he had ever used any medication; Bessell admitted to regular use of sleeping pills. Bessell admitted to his having "a credibility problem" and being a compulsive liar.

The judge's summing-up to the jury just before their deliberations emphasised Thorpe's distinguished public record, but he was scathing about all the principal prosecution witnesses: Bessell was a "humbug", Scott a fraud, a sponger, a whiner, a parasite—"but of course he could still be telling the truth". Newton was "determined to milk the case as hard as he can". This rather unusual summing-up was almost immediately heavily lampooned for what some perceived as a marked bias in Peter Cook's 1979 spoken-word comedy LP "Here Comes the Judge", as it was viewed as part of an establishment conspiracy. On 20 June the jury retired; they returned two days later and acquitted the four defendants on all charges. In a televised statement and celebration of the outcome, Thorpe said that he considered the verdict "a complete vindication". Scott said he was "unsurprised" by the outcome, but was upset by the aspersions on his character made by the judge from the safety of the bench.

After the trial, Bessell published Cover-Up: The Jeremy Thorpe Affair (1981), a 574-page book which described his involvement in the case.

== Personal life ==
He married three times: Joyce Margaret Thomas (1943–49), who died prematurely from tuberculosis; and Pauline Colledge, whom he divorced in 1978 to marry Diane Miller, his long-term mistress.

A lifelong chain smoker, he died in 1985 from emphysema.

== In popular culture ==
Bessell was portrayed by Alex Jennings in the 2018 BBC One miniseries A Very English Scandal.

== Bibliography ==
- Bloch, Michael (2014). Jeremy Thorpe. London: Little Brown. ISBN 9780316856850.
- Chester, Lewis; Linklater, Magnus; May, David (1979). Jeremy Thorpe: A Secret Life. London: Fontana Books. ISBN 978-0-00-635733-9.
- Waugh, Auberon (1980). The Last Word. London: Michael Joseph. ISBN 978-0-7181-1799-3.

Parliament of the United Kingdom
Preceded by Sir Douglas Marshall	Member of Parliament for Bodmin; 1964–1970	Succeeded by Robert Hicks
