= Colin Breed =

British Liberal Democrat politician (1947–2024)

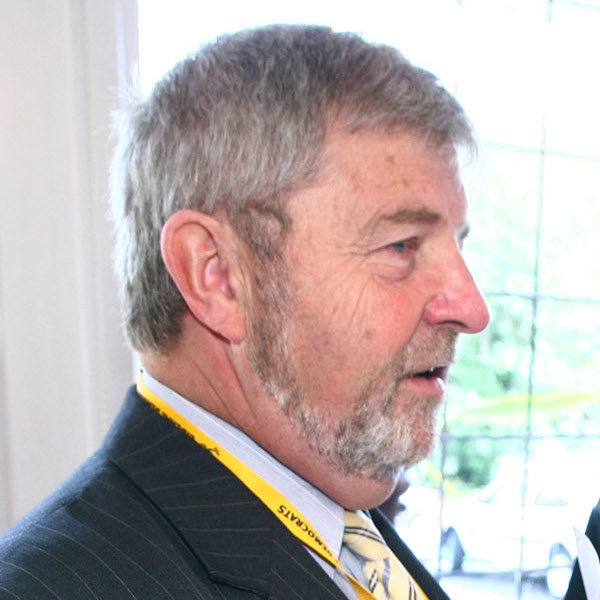
- Breed in 2009

Member of Parliament for South East Cornwall
- In office 1 May 1997 – 12 April 2010
- Preceded by: Robert Hicks
- Succeeded by: Sheryll Murray

Personal details
- Born: 4 May 1947 Surrey, England
- Died: 9 May 2024 (aged 77)
- Party: Liberal Democrat
- Spouse: Janet Courtiour

Colin Edward Breed (4 May 1947 – 9 May 2024) was a British Liberal Democrat politician. He was the Member of Parliament (MP) for South East Cornwall from 1997 until he stood down at the 2010 general election. He was also member of the parliamentary party's Treasury team.

== Early life ==
Breed was born in north-east Surrey on 4 May 1947, the son of a chef. He was educated at Torquay Boys' Grammar School.

Breed was appointed an area manager with the Midland Bank in 1964. After 17 years with the bank, he became the managing director of Rowan Dartington & Co Ltd in 1981, before becoming a director with Gemini Abrasives in 1992 until his election to Westminster.

== Political career ==
Breed was elected as a councillor to both the Caradon District Council and to the Saltash Town Council in 1982. He was twice selected as the Mayor of Saltash. He was selected to contest the constituency of Cornwall South East at the 1997 general election, when the sitting Conservative MP Robert Hicks was retiring. The 1997 general election saw losses for the Conservatives across the UK and Breed was comfortably elected as the new Liberal Democrat MP for Cornwall South East with a majority of 6,480. He made his maiden speech on 24 June 1997 on the preservation of plant varieties.

In Parliament, Breed was appointed a Liberal Democrat spokesman on Trade and Industry by Paddy Ashdown in 1997. When Charles Kennedy was elected as the Leader of the Liberal Democrats in 1999, Breed was promoted to the Liberal Democrat Shadow Cabinet as the Shadow Agriculture minister. In the same year he became a member of the General Medical Council.

Breed was dropped from the Liberal Democrat Shadow Cabinet following the 2001 general election, but was appointed a spokesman on the Environment, Food and Rural Affairs, before moving to speak on Defence in 2002. He returned to be a spokesman on the Environment, Food and Rural Affairs following the 2005 General Election.

Breed stood down from Parliament in April 2010, aged 62, and did not seek re-election. His seat was lost to the Conservative Sheryll Murray who won with a 9.1% swing.

== Personal life and death ==
Breed was a Methodist lay preacher and voted conservatively on issues such as homosexuality. He married Janet Courtier in 1968 in Torbay and they had a son and a daughter.

Breed died on 9 May 2024, at the age of 77.

Parliament of the United Kingdom
Preceded by Robert Hicks	Member of Parliament for South East Cornwall; 1997–2010	Succeeded by Sheryll Murray
