= Anthony Bennett (MP) =

16th-century English politician

Anthony Bennet was an English politician.

He was a member (MP) of the parliament of England for Bodmin in 1593.
