= Robert Hicks (British politician) =

British politician

Sir Robert Hicks MP

Member of Parliament
- In office 10 October 1974 – 8 April 1997
- Preceded by: Paul Tyler
- Succeeded by: Colin Breed
- Constituency: Bodmin (1974–1983); South East Cornwall (1983–1997)
- In office 18 June 1970 – 8 February 1974
- Preceded by: Peter Bessell
- Succeeded by: Paul Tyler
- Constituency: Bodmin

Personal details
- Born: Robert Adrian Hicks; 18 January 1938 (age 88)
- Party: Conservative

Sir Robert Adrian Hicks (born 18 January 1938) is a former Conservative Party politician in the United Kingdom.

Hicks unsuccessfully contested Aberavon in 1966. He was member of parliament for Bodmin from 1970 to February 1974 (when the seat was temporarily gained by the Liberals) and from October 1974 to 1983. Following boundary changes, he was MP for South East Cornwall from 1983 until he stood down in 1997.

In 1999, he announced his support for the Pro Euro Conservative Party.

Parliament of the United Kingdom
Preceded by Peter Bessell	Member of Parliament for Bodmin; 1970–Feb 1974	Succeeded by Paul Tyler
Preceded by Paul Tyler	Member of Parliament for Bodmin; Oct 1974–1983	constituency abolished
New constituency	Member of Parliament for South East Cornwall; 1983–1997	Succeeded by Colin Breed
