= Brutus Browne =

English politician and naval officer

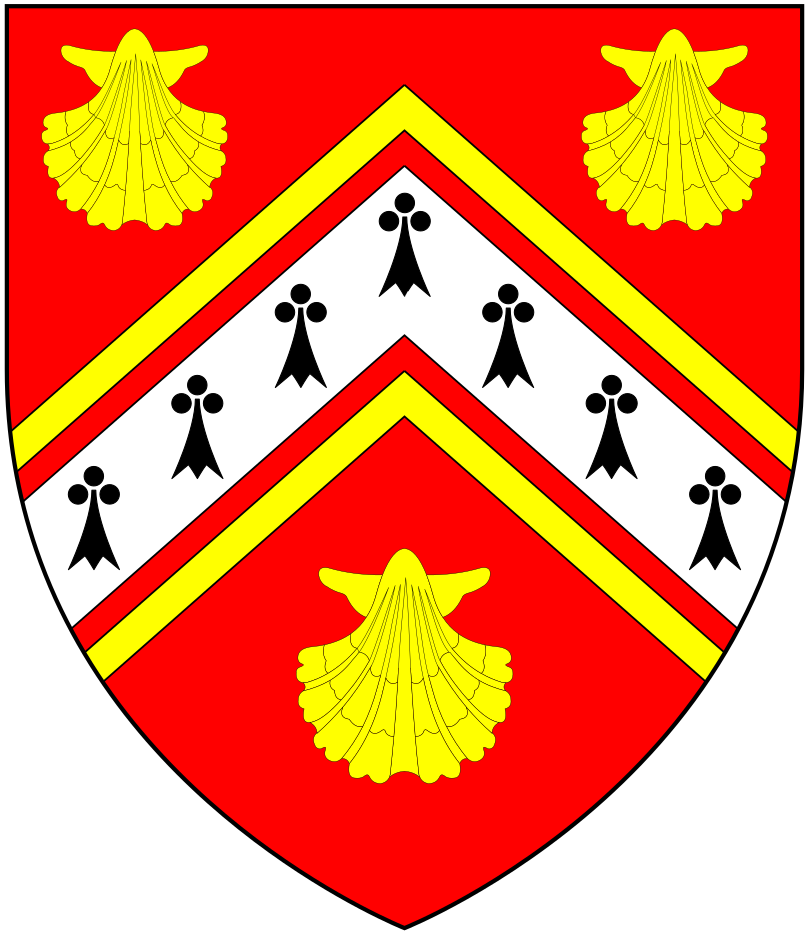
Arms of Browne of Langtree: Gules, a chevron ermine between two chevronells and three escallops or

Brutus Browne (by 1564-1595), of Brown's Hillash, in the parish of Langtree, Devon, was an English naval officer who fought against the Spanish Armada of 1588 and was a Member of Parliament for Bodmin, Cornwall, in 1586-7.

== Origins ==
He was the second son and heir of Thomas Browne (d.1596) (alias Bevill) of Brown's Ilash, a feodary (an official of the Court of Wards and Liveries) of the Duchy of Cornwall, by his wife Joane Lene, daughter and heiress of John Lene of Cornwall. His younger brother was Sir Thomas Browne (d.1614) of Langtree, who was knighted at Windsor Castle on 9 July 1603 and who built at Brown's Ilash "a dwelling house with a park thereunto" (Risdon). Sir Thomas Browne died without progeny, after which the family estates were "divided among distaffs"(Risdon).

== Career ==
=== Member of Parliament ===
His parliamentary seat for Bodmin in Cornwall was probably due to his father's influence as a feodary of the Duchy of Cornwall.

=== Naval officer ===
He fought against the Spanish Armada of 1588, aboard the galleon Rainbow under the command of Lord Henry Seymour, a younger son of Edward Seymour, 1st Duke of Somerset by his second wife Anne Stanhope. In 1595 he took part in and invested 1,000 marks in (what proved to be) the last expedition of Drake and Hawkins, which sought to capture a Spanish treasure ship, believed to be waiting at Puerto Rico. The Spanish learned of the plan and were well-prepared when the Rainbow reached Puerto Rico in November 1595.

The Spanish shore batteries fired on the English fleet at anchor and a cannonball penetrated the great cabin of the Defiance, where Sir Francis Drake and his officers, including Browne, were at table. Drake's stool was knocked from under him, and although he was uninjured, Browne Sir Nicholas Clifford were mortally wounded. Browne wrote his will on board the Defiance on 19 November 1595 and commended his body to the earth or to the sea "whereof I am indifferent". He bequeathed a diamond ring to Drake, whom he described as his "honourable and most kind good friend", as "a testimony of the honest love he owed him, and with many hearty wishes for his happy success in his voyage". He appears to have died unmarried.

== Sources ==
- Vivian, Lt.Col. J.L., (Ed.) The Visitations of the County of Devon: Comprising the Heralds' Visitations of 1531, 1564 & 1620, Exeter, 1895, p. 112, pedigree of Browne of Browne
- "N.M.S.", biography of Browne, Brutus (by 1564-95), of Langtree, Devon, published in History of Parliament: House of Commons 1558-1603, ed. P.W. Hasler, 1981
