= John Drew =

John Drew may refer to:

== Government ==
- John Drew (American politician) (1945–1997), American politician and businessman
- John Drew (Australian politician) (1865–1947), Australian politician

== Sports ==
- John Drew (baseball) (1883–1977), African-American sports executive
- John Drew (basketball) (1954–2022), American basketball player
- John Drew-Bear (born 1955), Venezuelan sailor

== Others ==
- John Drew (banker) (1734–1808), English banker
- John Drew (Cherokee) (1796–1865), Confederate army officer during the American Civil War
- John Drew Sr. (1827–1862), Irish-American stage actor and theatre manager
- John Drew Jr. (1853–1927), American stage actor
- John Drew (trader), 19th century trader in the Mackinac area
- John Drew (astronomer) (1809–1857), English astronomer
- John M. L. Drew (born 1966), British literary scholar

== See also ==
- Jon Drew, Canadian record producer and recording engineer
- John Drewe (disambiguation)
