= Douglas Marshall =

British businessman and politician (1906–1976)

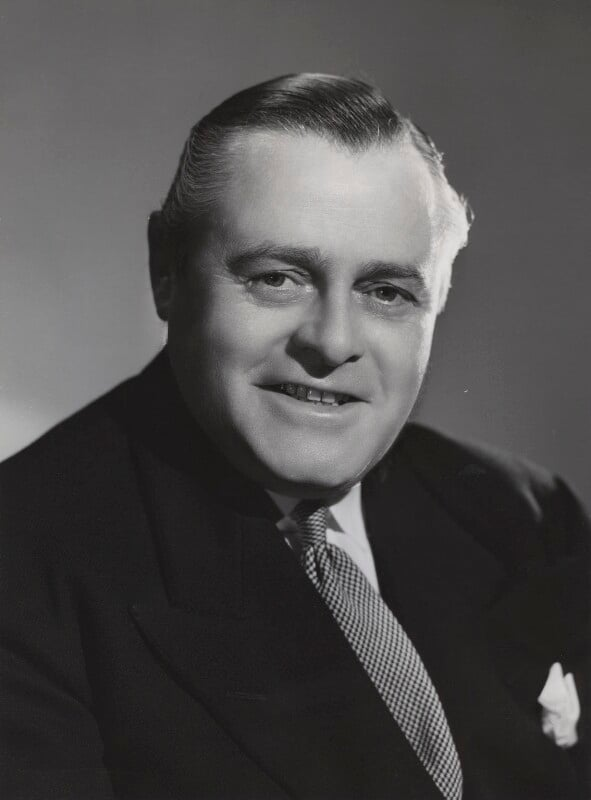
Marshall in 1950

Commander Sir Douglas Marshall (2 October 1906 – 24 August 1976) was a British businessman in insurance and banking and a Conservative Party politician, and Member of Parliament for Bodmin from 1945 to 1964.

Marshall was born on 2 October 1906 and he became a businessman in insurance and banking. In 1939, Marshall joined the Trade Division of the Admiralty and was commissioned in the Royal Naval Volunteer Reserve.

In the 1945 General Election, he was elected as a Member of Parliament for Bodmin. In the 1964 general election, he lost his seat to the Liberal Party candidate Peter Bessell.

Marshall married Joan Annette Sherry in 1929 and they had one daughter. Joan died in 1952. He married Symons in 1953 and they had a daughter as well as four step-children.

Parliament of the United Kingdom
Preceded by Beatrice Rathbone	Member of Parliament for Bodmin; 1945–1964	Succeeded by Peter Bessell
