= Sheryll Murray =

British Conservative politician

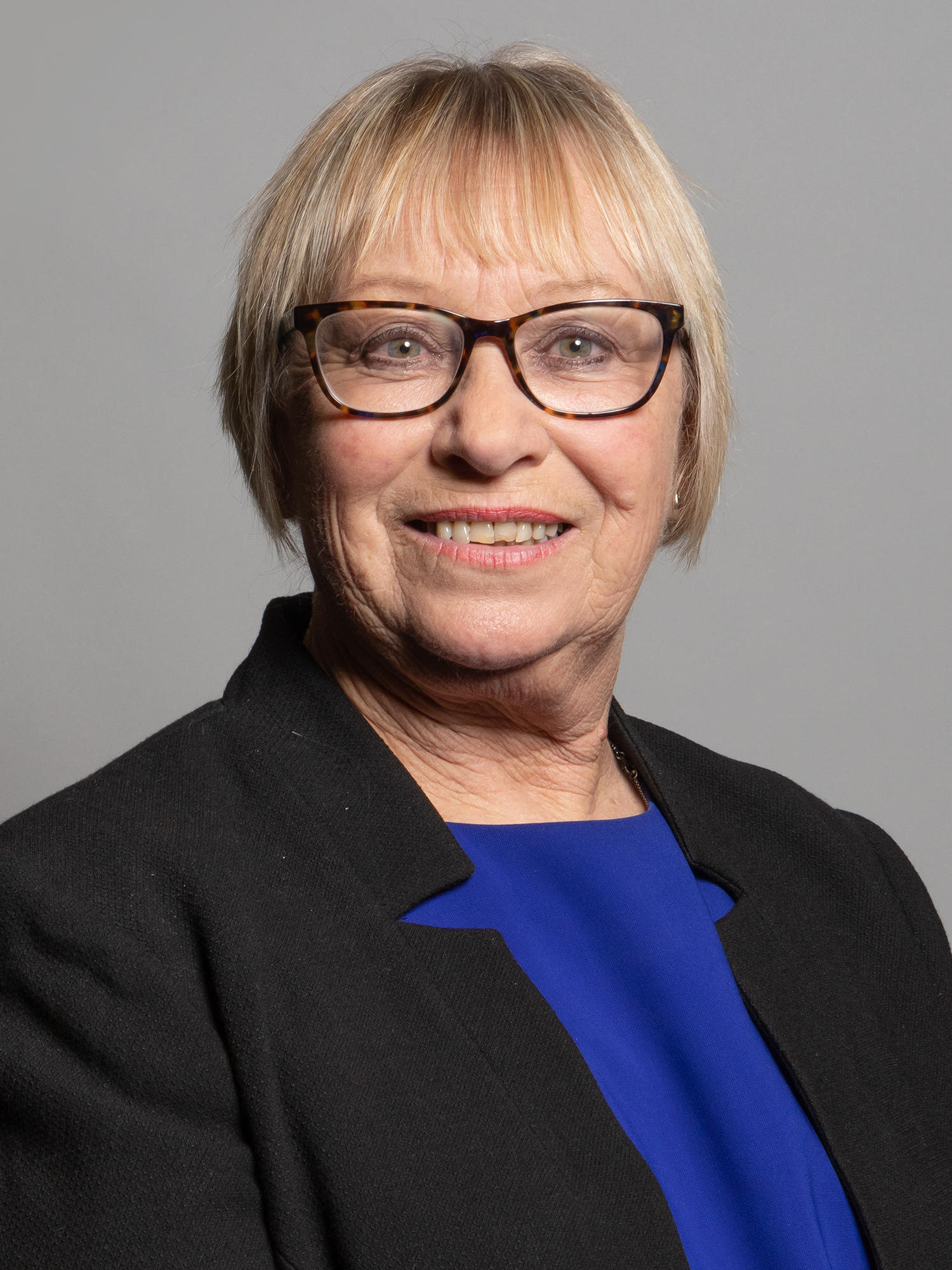
- Official portrait, 2020

Member of Parliament for South East Cornwall
- In office 6 May 2010 – 30 May 2024
- Preceded by: Colin Breed
- Succeeded by: Anna Gelderd

Personal details
- Born: 4 February 1956 (age 70) Millbrook, Cornwall, England
- Party: Conservative
- Spouse(s): Jon Whitehall (divorced); Neil Murray (deceased); Robert Davidson (2019–present)
- Children: 2
- Website: Official website

Sheryll Murray (née Hickman; 4 February 1956) is a British Conservative Party politician. She was the Member of Parliament (MP) for South East Cornwall from 2010 to 2024.

== Early life and career ==
Sheryll Hickman was born in Millbrook, Cornwall, on 4 February 1956. Her mother's family had lived in Millbrook for generations, and her father's family was from Calstock, a nearby village. She was state educated at Millbrook Primary and Torpoint Community College, leaving the latter at the age of 16 with 5 O-Levels. She then worked for the South Western Electricity Board, and as an insurance underwriter, and later as a medical receptionist at a GP surgery. She served as a Governor of Torpoint School for nine years until 2008, before standing down to concentrate on campaigning for the forthcoming general election.

Prior to her parliamentary career, Murray represented Rame as a Cornwall County Councillor before losing her seat in 2005, and served as Leader of the Conservative Group on Caradon District Council, when a councillor for Millbrook, prior to its abolition in 2009.

== Parliamentary career ==
At the 2010 general election, Murray was elected as MP for South East Cornwall with 45.1% of the vote and a majority of 3,220.

The Conservative whips' office apologised for Murray's behaviour after she was reportedly drunk and disorderly in the House of Commons bar in 2010. Murray was later heavily criticised for signing a letter calling for tougher regulation of the press on the basis of her experience of press criticism following her behaviour.

In May 2012, she was elected to the 1922 Committee by her Conservative Parliamentary colleagues.

Having come 12th in the private member's bill ballot in May 2012, Murray's Bill, the Marine Navigation (No.2) Bill, received royal assent as the Marine Navigation Act 2013 in April 2013. In May 2013, she came 4th in the ballot, and introduced a Bill which received royal assent as the Deep Sea Mining Act 2014 in May 2014.

Murray was re-elected as MP for South East Cornwall at the 2015 general election with an increased vote share of 50.5% and an increased majority of 16,995.

Murray supported Brexit in the 2016 European Union Referendum.

In 2016, the Labour Party unsuccessfully proposed an amendment in Parliament that would have required private landlords to make their homes "fit for human habitation". According to Parliament's register of interests, Murray was one of 72 Conservative MPs who voted against the amendment who personally derived an income from renting out property. The Conservative Government had responded to the amendment that they believed homes should be fit for human habitation but did not want to pass the new law that would explicitly require it.

During the 2017 general election campaign in early June, Murray said at a hustings meeting: "If for instance somebody had moved house, or if their financial situation had changed while they're going through the reassessment and their benefits are delayed, then sometimes they need to call upon the food banks. But I am really pleased we have food banks in south east Cornwall". These comments sparked widespread anger. Audience members at the event booed Murray, to whom Murray responded with a gesture with her hand towards the group booing her and commented to the rest of the audience, "... and let's ignore these people". One woman heckled her, who Murray threatened with the threat of calling the police to remove the woman from the hustings after she refused to leave the event. Later, she clarified her comments: "Nobody is saying a person going hungry is a good thing and everything must be done to stop this. Whilst we work to eradicate hunger however the food banks themselves do provide a good service".

At the snap 2017 general election, Murray was again re-elected with an increased vote share of 55.4% and an increased majority of 17,443. After her re-election, Murray called for greater regulation of social media content and protection of MPs from intimidation after stating that during the campaign she was personally subjected to sustained abuse from users on social media.

On 15 November 2018, Murray submitted a letter of no confidence in Theresa May's leadership. The next month, Murray said she would vote against the Prime Minister in the Conservative no confidence vote.

In the House of Commons she sits on the Environment, Food and Rural Affairs Select Committee. She has previously sat on the Environmental Audit Committee. Her main policy interests are the environment and tourism; she has campaigned on fisheries issues as a spokesperson for Save Britain's Fish and is a member of the Fishermen's Association.

At the 2019 general election, Murray was again re-elected with an increased vote share of 59.3% and an increased majority of 20,971.

On 10 March 2021, she took the opportunity of a Prime Minister's Question to suggest that British people should take advantage of Brexit to eat more British-caught fish.

In March 2022, Murray called for the creation of a national 'Margaret Thatcher Day', which was endorsed by minister Kemi Badenoch.

On 11 July 2022, Murray lost her position as executive member of the Conservatives’ 1922 Committee. She had held the position for 10 years.

Murray publicly called for the resignation of Prime Minister Liz Truss on 20 October 2022. She also said she had submitted a letter of no confidence in Truss's leadership.

In February 2024, Murray was re-selected as the Conservative candidate for South East Cornwall at the 2024 general election.

At the 2024 General Election she lost her seat to the Labour Candidate.

== Personal life ==
Sheryll Murray's first marriage was to Jon Whitehall, a geologist, but the marriage ended after seven years. Murray then married trawlerman Neil Murray, who died in a fishing accident on 24 March 2011. A search by local fishermen and the emergency services discovered his body on board his boat Our Boy Andrew. Murray has one daughter and one son. Her daughter Sally from her first marriage is an officer in the Royal Navy. Her son Andrew from her second marriage works in marine electronics. Her long-term partner since 2013 was her campaign manager and office manager Robert Davidson. They were married in March 2019 in the House of Commons.

Murray employs her husband as her Office Manager on a salary up to £40,000. Although MPs who were first elected in 2017 have been banned from employing family members, the restriction is not retrospective – meaning that Murray's employment of her husband is lawful.

Parliament of the United Kingdom
Preceded by Colin Breed	Member of Parliament for South East Cornwall; 2010–2024	Succeeded by Anna Gelderd
