= John Silly =

English politician

John Silly (c 1621–1672) was an English politician who sat in the House of Commons in 1659 and 1660.

Silly was the second son of John Silly (died 1646) of Trevelver, Cornwall, and his first wife Elizabeth Marke, daughter of John Marke of St Wenn. His father, an attorney, had altered his name and arms from Ceely to Silly.

In 1659, Silly was elected Member of Parliament for Bodmin in the Third Protectorate Parliament. In 1660, he was re-elected MP for Bodmin in the Convention Parliament. Silly inherited the St Wenn estates of his grandfather. In 1667, on the death of his nephew, he also inherited the Silly estates at Trevelver to which he promptly moved.

Silly married Jane Cotton, daughter of William Cotton, precentor of Exeter Cathedral.

Parliament of England
Preceded by Not represented in Second Protectorate Parliament	Member of Parliament for Bodmin; 1659; With: William Turner	Succeeded by Not represented in restored Rump
