= Stephen Bant =

English politician

Stephen Bant (fl. 1377–1419) was an English politician. He sat as MP for Liskeard in January 1377, Bodmin in 1378, Liskeard in 1381, October 1382, Lostwithiel in October 1382, Liskeard in November 1384, 1385, Bodmin in 1385, Lostwithiel in 1385, Liskeard in 1386 and Bodmin in February 1388.

He married Sarah.

== Political career ==
He sat as Under Sheriff of Cornwall from 1395 till 1396; commissioner of inquiry concerning concealments in Devon and Cornwall in October 1397, concerning the Manor of Trelaske in Cornwall in March 1401, concerning the liberties of the burgesses of Liskeard in February 1417; and justice of assize in Cornwall in July 1410.
