= John Kestell =

16th-century English politician

John Kestell (fl. 1571) was an English politician.

He was a member (MP) of the parliament of England for Bodmin in 1571.
