= Edmund Poley (1544–1613) =

16th-century English politician

Member of Parliament for Clitheroe
- In office 1586

Member of Parliament for Knaresborough
- In office 1584

Member of Parliament for Bodmin
- In office 1572-1581

Personal details
- Born: 1544
- Died: 1613 (aged 68–69)
- Spouse: Catherine Seckford
- Relatives: Thomas Wentworth (grandfather); Thomas Poley (uncle)

Edmund Poley (1544–1613), of Badley, Suffolk was an English politician. He was a Member of the Parliament of England for Bodmin in 1572–1581, for Knaresborough in 1584 and for Clitheroe in 1586.

Edmund was the son of John Poley and Anne, daughter of Thomas Wentworth. Thomas Poley, MP, was his uncle. He married Catherine Seckford, sister of Charles Seckford, MP.
