= Henry Baudyn =

English politician

Henry Baudyn (fl. 1386–1406) was an English politician. He sat as MP for Bodmin in 1386, September 1388 and January 1390.

He married Alice.
