= James Wyld =

British geographer and map-seller

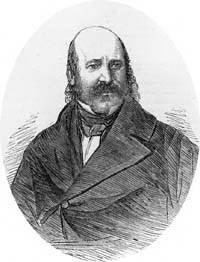
- Born: 1812
- Died: 1887 (aged 74–75)
- Political party: Liberal Party (UK)
- Spouse: Anne Hester
- Children: 2
- Parent(s): James Wyld the Elder; Eliza Legg

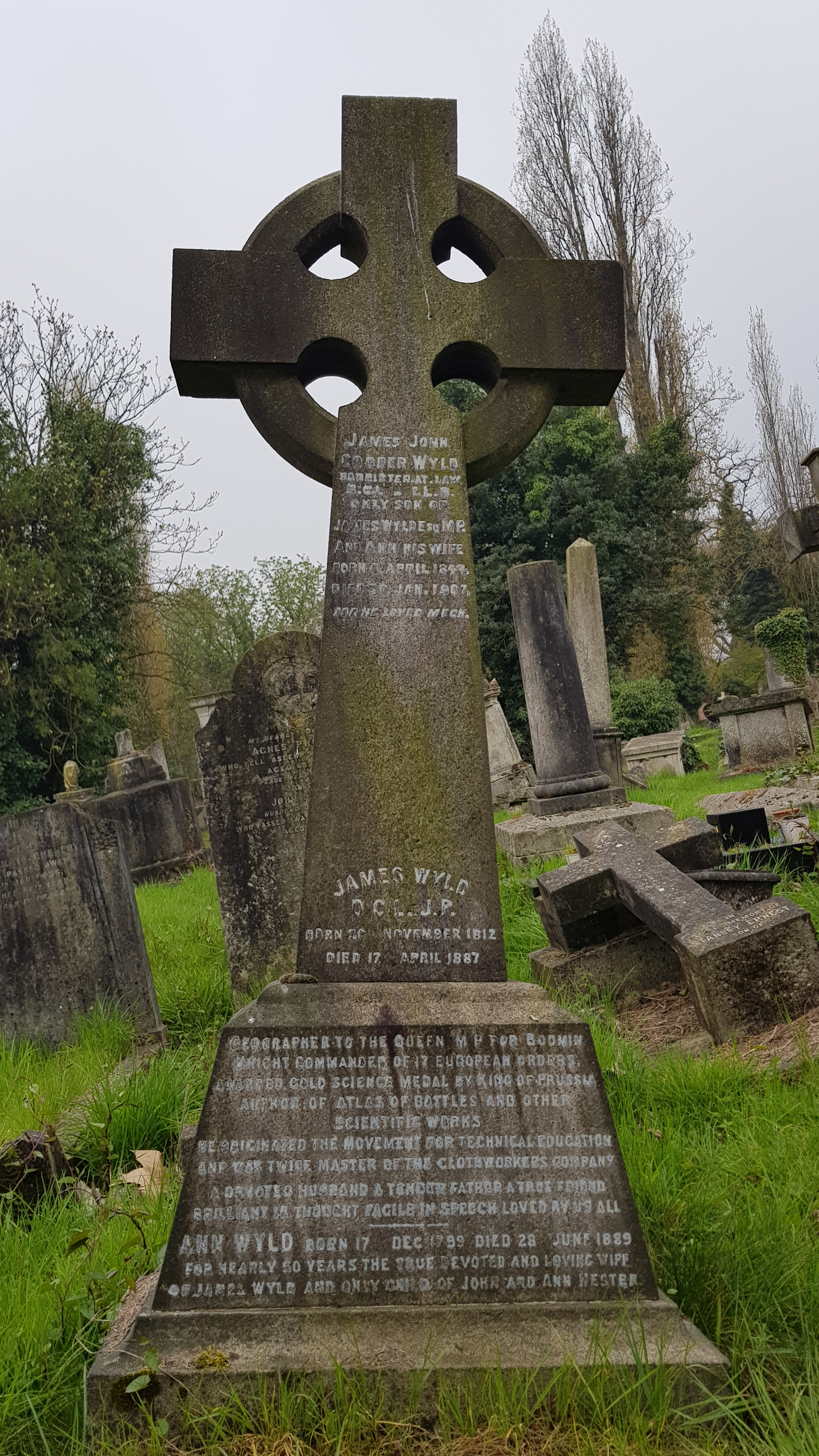
Wyld's grave at Kensal Green Cemetery

James Wyld (1812–1887) was a British geographer and map-seller, best known for Wyld's Great Globe.

He was the eldest son of James Wyld the Elder (1790–1836) and Eliza (née Legg). In 1838, he married Anne, the daughter of John Hester, and had two children, one of whom, James John Cooper Wyld also became a map publisher.

On his father's death in 1836, Wyld became the sole owner of the thriving family mapmaking business based in Charing Cross. His maps, which covered regions as diverse as London and the gold fields of California, were regarded highly, and Wyld himself had an excellent reputation as a mapmaker; he was elected as a fellow of the Royal Geographical Society in 1839, and he was appointed Geographer to Queen Victoria and Prince Albert (as had been his father before him).

He had an opportunistic approach to the business and was a prolific publisher of maps and guides (so much so that Punch claimed that if a country were discovered in the interior of the Earth Wyld would produce a map of it "as soon as it is discovered, if not before"), but his projects were not always successful; although he profited from the "Railway Mania" of the later 1830s, he became entangled in a number of court cases with unsuccessful railway companies as a result, and he overreached himself by printing maps and guides of the London rail network which included stations and connections that were planned but subsequently not built. He helped start both the Association of Surveyors and the Surveyors' Institution to lobby against the Ordnance Survey, as he felt its activities threatened his business, but when these associations failed, he pragmatically got his company appointed as one of the six official outlets for the new OS maps. He had an account at the Royal British Bank, which collapsed in 1856, wiping out the savings of many of the depositors, but the extent of his losses is not recorded. Wyld was the chairman of the depositors committee which managed to negotiate a favourable return of 15 shillings in the pound from the shareholders.

He was also the Liberal MP for Bodmin, though his political career was on hiatus for much of the time that he managed the Great Globe. On his first election in 1848 there were charges of bribery at the polling stations, although it was decided that these accusations could not be substantiated, and he was allowed to take up his seat. His idea for the Great Globe had been many years in the formulation: a correspondent of Notes and Queries mentioned that as early as 1839, Wyld had broached the subject of a concave globe at a meeting to discuss an earlier giant globe project. This plan by William Vialls for a georama in London never progressed past the planning stage

Parliament of the United Kingdom
Preceded by Samuel Thomas Spry; John Dunn Gardner	Member of Parliament for Bodmin; 1847–1852; Served alongside: Henry Charles Lacy	Succeeded by William Michell; Charles Graves-Sawle
Preceded by William Michell; Charles Graves-Sawle	Member of Parliament for Bodmin; 1857 – April 1859; Served alongside: John Vivian	Succeeded by Frederick Leveson-Gower; William Michell
Preceded by Frederick Leveson-Gower; William Michell	Member of Parliament for Bodmin; August 1859 – 1868; Served alongside: Frederick Leveson-Gower	Succeeded by Frederick Leveson-Gower
