= Thomas Bere (Bodmin MP) =

English politician

Thomas Bere or Bera (fl. 1391–1397) of Bodmin, Cornwall, was an English politician.

He was a member (MP) of the parliament of England for Bodmin in 1391, 1395 and January 1397.
