= Bodmin (constituency) =

Former parliamentary constituency in the United Kingdom

- Former borough constituency for the House of Commons

1295–1885
- Seats: 1295–1868: two 1868–1885: one
- Replaced by: Bodmin

Bodmin division of Cornwall
- Former county constituency for the House of Commons
- Bodmin in Cornwall 1974-83

1885–1983
- Seats: One
- Created from: Bodmin, East Cornwall and Liskeard
- Replaced by: North Cornwall and South East Cornwall

Bodmin was the name of a parliamentary constituency in Cornwall from 1295 until 1983. Initially, it was a parliamentary borough, which returned two Members of Parliament to the House of Commons of England, House of Commons of Great Britain and later the House of Commons of the Parliament of the United Kingdom until the 1868 general election, when its representation was reduced to one member.

The old borough was abolished with effect from the 1885 general election, but the name was transferred to a county constituency, which elected a single member until the constituency was abolished with effect from the 1983 general election, when it was largely replaced by the new South East Cornwall, though some areas, including the town of Bodmin itself, were transferred to the existing North Cornwall.

== Boundaries ==
1885–1918: The Boroughs of Bodmin and Liskeard, the Sessional Division of East, South, and West Hundred, part of the Sessional Division of Powder Tywardreath, and the parishes of Bodmin, Helland, and Lanivet.

1918–1950: The Boroughs of Bodmin, Fowey, Liskeard, Lostwithiel, and Saltash, the Urban Districts of Callington, Looe, and Torpoint, the Rural Districts of Liskeard and St Germans, in the Rural District of St Austell the parishes of St Sampson and Tywardreath, and part of the Rural District of Bodmin.

1950–1974: The Boroughs of Bodmin, Fowey, Liskeard, Lostwithiel, and Saltash, the Urban Districts of Looe and Torpoint, the Rural Districts of Liskeard and St Germans, in the Rural District of St Austell the parishes of Lanlivery, Luxulyan, and St Sampson, and in the Rural District of Wadebridge the parishes of Blisland, Cardinham, Helland, Lanhydrock, Lanivet, and Withiel.

1974–1983: The Boroughs of Bodmin, Liskeard, and Saltash, the Urban Districts of Looe and Torpoint, the Rural Districts of Liskeard and St Germans, the Rural Borough of Lostwithiel, in the Rural District of St Austell the parishes of Lanlivery, Luxulyan, and St Sampson, and in the Rural District of Wadebridge and Padstow the parishes of Blisland, Cardinham, Helland, Lanhydrock, Lanivet, and Withiel.

== History ==
=== Borough constituency (1295–1885) ===
The borough which was represented from the time of the Model Parliament consisted of the town of Bodmin though not the whole of the parish. Unlike many of the boroughs in Cornwall which were represented in the Unreformed House of Commons, Bodmin was a town of reasonable size and retained some importance; for most purposes, indeed, it was considered the county town of Cornwall. In 1831, the population of the borough was 3,375, and contained 596 houses.

The right to vote, however, was held not by the residents at large but by the town's corporation, consisting of a Mayor, 11 aldermen and 24 common councilmen. Contested elections were quite unknown before the Reform Act, the choice of the two MPs being left entirely to the "patron". However, this power did not arise, as in many rotten boroughs, from the patron being able to coerce the voters; in Bodmin, the patron was expected to meet the public and private expenses of the corporation and its members in return for their acquiescence at election time.

Early in the 18th century, the Robartes family (Earls of Radnor) were the accepted patrons. Their interest was inherited by George Hunt, whose mother was the Robartes heiress, but he ran into difficulties and could not afford to retain complete control. By the 1760s another local magnate, Sir William Irby, secured enough of the town's goodwill to have a say in the choice of one member, while Hunt continued to select the other. In 1816, the patron was Lord de Dunstanville, nominating both MPs, but he found himself so overburdened with debts that he was forced to give it up, and The Marquess of Hertford was induced to take over the patronage, and the corporation's debts.

While the MP was not expected to assume the same financial obligations as the patron, nor to attend to the needs of his constituents in the manner of a modern MP, they were expected to attend the election ball, a high point in the social calendar for the wives and daughters of the otherwise undistinguished corporation members. John Wilson Croker, elected in 1820, described the Bodmin ball as "tumultuous and merry " but "at once tiresome and foolish".

Bodmin retained both its MPs under the Reform Act, but its boundaries were extended to bring in more of Bodmin parish and the whole of the neighbouring parishes of Lanivet, Lanhydrock and Helland. This increased the population to 5,258, although only 252 were qualified to vote.

By the time of the second Reform Act in 1867, Bodmin's electorate was still below 400, and consequently its representation was halved with effect from the 1868 general election. The extension of the franchise more than doubled the electorate, but Bodmin was still far too small to survive as a borough, and was abolished in 1885.

=== County constituency (1885–1983) ===
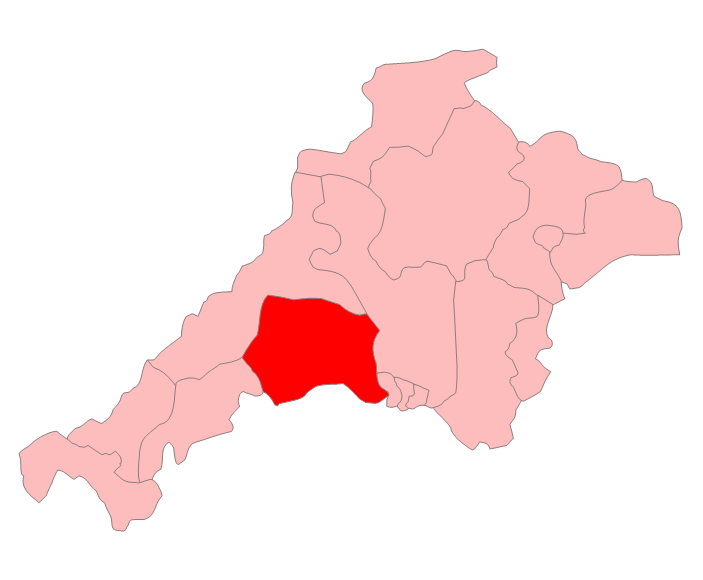
Bodmin in Cornwall & Devon 1918–1945

The Bodmin constituency from 1885 until 1918, strictly called the South-Eastern or Bodmin Division of Cornwall, covered the whole of the south-east corner of the county, including as well as Bodmin itself the towns of Liskeard, Fowey, Lostwithiel and Saltash. Although predominantly rural, the string of small ports along its coast gave it a maritime as well as agricultural character. Through most of this period the constituency was marginal, the Unionists being helped by the popularity of their candidate Leonard Courtney, who had been Liberal MP for Liskeard when it was still a separate borough before joining the Liberal Unionists when the party split in 1886. Looe and the other fishing ports were predominantly Liberal and Fowey a Unionist stronghold, while the areas within the ambit of Plymouth's dockyards tended to vote against whichever was the sitting government. Another factor was the strength of non-conformist religion, as elsewhere in Cornwall, and this was thought to be the explanation for the Liberal gain in 1906, when agricultural seats elsewhere mostly remained with the Tories.

The boundary changes at the 1918 general election, which established what was now called Cornwall, Bodmin Division, and later Bodmin County Constituency, extended the constituency somewhat towards the centre of the county, taking in Callington and the surrounding district. These boundaries remained essentially unchanged for the remainder of the constituency's existence, except that Fowey was moved into the Truro constituency in 1974. As elsewhere in Cornwall, Labour never established a foothold in Bodmin, and the Liberals remained the main challengers to the Conservatives. The Conservatives held it continuously from 1945 to 1964, and at one point might have considered it a safe seat, but by the mid-1960s the Liberal revival had established it as a Liberal-Conservative marginal, which it remained until its abolition.

The Bodmin constituency ceased to exist as a result of the boundary changes implemented in 1983. Although the bulk of the constituency survived, Bodmin itself had been moved, enforcing a change of name: Bodmin joined North Cornwall, while the rest of the constituency was reunited with Fowey to become South East Cornwall. Bodmin's last Member, Robert Hicks, stood and was elected for the latter constituency.

== Members of Parliament ==
=== MPs 1295–1640 ===
Parliament	First member	Second member
1351–52	Johannes De Tremayn (Note: Also member for Helston.)	
Parliament of 1386	John Breton II	Henry Baudyn
First Parliament of 1388 (Feb)	Stephen Bant	John Syreston
Second Parliament of 1388 (Sep)	John Breton I	Henry Baudyn
First Parliament of 1390 (Jan)	John Breton I	Henry Baudyn
Second Parliament of 1390 (Nov)	?	?
Parliament of 1391	John Breton I	Thomas Bere
Parliament of 1393	John Breton I	John Drewe
Parliament of 1394	?	?
Parliament of 1395	John Tregoose	Thomas Bere
First Parliament of 1397 (Jan)	Stephen Trenewith	Thomas Bere
Second Parliament of 1397 (Sep)	John Trelawny I	John Breton I
Parliament of 1399	John Burgh I	James Halappe
Parliament of 1401	?	?
Parliament of 1402	John Nicoll	William Slingsby
First Parliament of 1404 (Jan)		
Second Parliament of 1404 (Oct)		
Parliament of 1406	Richard Allet	Benedict Burgess
Parliament of 1407	Michael Froden	Michael Hoge
Parliament of 1410	Otto Tregonan	William Moyle
Parliament of 1411	Otto Tregonan	John Wyse
First Parliament of 1413 (Feb)		
Second Parliament of 1413 (May)	John But	Robert Treage
First Parliament of 1414 (Apr)	John But	Otto Tregonan
Second Parliament of 1414 (Nov)	John Clink	John But
Parliament of 1415 or 1416 (Mar)	Nicholas Jop	Otto Tregonan
Parliament of 1416 (Oct)		
Parliament of 1417	Otto Tregonan	John Trewoofe
Parliament of 1419	Nicholas Bouy	John Trewoofe
Parliament of 1420	John Lawhire	Robert Treage
First Parliament of 1421 (May)	Otto Tregonan	David Urban
Second Parliament of 1421 (Dec)	William Chentleyn	Philip Motty
Parliament of 1437	James Flamank	Thomas Lanhergy
Parliament of 1515	John Flamank	Thomas Trott
Parliament of 1529	Thomas Treffry I	Gilbert Flamank
Parliament of 1545	Thomas Treffry II	Henry Chiverton
Parliament of 1547	Henry Chiverton	John Caplyn
First Parliament of 1553 (Mar)	John Caplyn	Ralph Cholmley
Second Parliament of 1553	Henry Chiverton	Thomas Mildmay
First Parliament of 1554 (Apr)	Henry Chiverton	John Sulyard
Second Parliament of 1554 (Nov)	John Courtney	Ralph Michell
Parliament of 1555	Thomas Williams	Humphrey Cavell
Parliament of 1558	Walter Hungerford	John Norris
Parliament of 1558–9	Nicholas Carminowe	Digory Chamond
Parliament of 1562	John Mallett	Francis Browne
Parliament of 1563–1567	John Mallett	Francis Browne
Parliament of 1571	Humphrey Smith	John Kestell
Parliament of 1572–1581	Thomas Cromwell	Edmund Poley
Parliament of 1584–1585	John Audley	Gilbert Michell
Parliament of 1586–1587	Emmanuel Chamond	Brutus Browne
Parliament of 1588–1589	Emmanuel Chamond	Hugh Beeston
Parliament of 1593	Anthony Bennet	Richard Connock
Parliament of 1597–1598	Sir Bernard Grenville	John Herbert
Parliament of 1601	William Lower	John Pigott
Parliament of 1604–1611	John Stone	Richard Spray
Addled Parliament (1614)	Christopher Spray	Richard Edgecumbe
Parliament of 1621–1622	Sir John Trevor	James Bagge, junior
Happy Parliament (1624–1625)	Sir Thomas Stafford	Charles Berkeley
Useless Parliament (1625)	Henry Jermyn	Robert Caesar
Parliament of 1625–1626	Henry Jermyn	Sir Richard Weston
Parliament of 1628–1629	Sir Robert Killigrew	Humphrey Nicholls
No Parliament summoned 1629–1640

Back to Members of Parliament

=== MPs 1640–1868 ===
Year	1st member	1st party	2nd member	2nd party
April 1640	Richard Prideaux		Sir Richard Wynn	
November 1640	John Arundell	Royalist	Anthony Nicholl	Parliamentarian
January 1644	Arundel disabled from sitting - seat vacant		Anthony Nicholl	Parliamentarian
1648	Thomas Waller		Anthony Nicholl	Parliamentarian
December 1648	Waller excluded in Pride's Purge - seat vacant		Nichols not known to have sat after Pride's Purge	
1653	Bodmin was unrepresented in the Barebones Parliament and the First and Second Parliaments of the Protectorate			
January 1659	John Silly		William Turner	
May 1659	Not represented in the restored Rump			
April 1660	Hender Robartes		John Silly	
1661	Hender Robartes		Sir John Carew	
1679	Hender Robartes		Nicholas Glynn	Tory
1689	Sir John Cutler Bt		Nicholas Glynn	Tory
1693	Russell Robartes		Nicholas Glynn	Tory
1695	Russell Robartes		John Hoblyn	Tory
July 1702	John Grobham Howe	Tory	John Hoblyn	Tory
December 1702	Francis Robartes		John Hoblyn	Tory
1706	Francis Robartes		Thomas Herne	Tory
1708	John Trevanion	Tory	Russell Robartes	
1710	Francis Robartes		Russell Robartes	
1713	Francis Robartes		Thomas Sclater	Tory
1715	Francis Robartes		John Legh	
1718	Charles Beauclerk	Whig	John Legh	
1722	Isaac le Heup		Richard West	
January 1727	Isaac le Heup		John LaRoche	Whig
August 1727	Robert Booth		John LaRoche	Whig
1733	Sir John Heathcote		John LaRoche	Whig
1741	Thomas Bludworth		John LaRoche	Whig
1747	Sir William Irby		John LaRoche	Whig
1753	Sir William Irby		George Hunt	
1761	John Parker		George Hunt	
1762	Sir Christopher Treise	Tory	George Hunt	
1768	James La Roche		George Hunt	
1780	William Masterman		George Hunt	
1784	Sir John Morshead		Thomas Hunt	
1789	Sir John Morshead		George Wilbraham	
1790	Sir John Morshead		Roger Wilbraham	
1796	Sir John Morshead		John Nesbitt	
July 1802	Sir John Morshead		Charles Shaw-Lefevre, sat for Reading	Whig
December 1802	Josias Porcher		John Sargent	
August 1806	Josias Porcher		James Topping	
November 1806	William Wingfield	Tory	Davies Giddy, later Gilbert	Tory
1807	Sir William Oglander	Tory	Davies Giddy, later Gilbert	Tory
1812	Charles Bathurst	Tory	Davies Giddy, later Gilbert	Tory
1818	Thomas Bradyll	Tory	Davies Giddy, later Gilbert	Tory
1820	John Wilson Croker	Tory	Davies Giddy, later Gilbert	Tory
1826	Horace Seymour	Tory	Davies Giddy, later Gilbert	Tory
1832	William Peter	Whig	Samuel Thomas Spry	Whig
1835	Charles Vivian	Whig	Samuel Thomas Spry	Whig
1837	Charles Vivian	Whig	Samuel Thomas Spry	Conservative
1841	Charles Vivian	Whig	John Dunn Gardner	Conservative
1843	Sir Samuel Thomas Spry	Conservative	John Dunn Gardner	Conservative
1847	James Wyld	Radical	Henry Lacy	Whig
1852	William Michell	Conservative	Charles Graves-Sawle	Whig
1857	Hon. John Vivian	Whig	James Wyld	Radical
April 1859	Hon. Frederick Leveson-Gower	Liberal	William Michell	Conservative
August 1859	Hon. Frederick Leveson-Gower	Liberal	James Wyld	Liberal
1868	Representation reduced to one member			

Back to Members of Parliament

=== MPs 1868–1983 ===
Election	Member	Party
1868	Representation reduced to one member	
1868	Hon. Frederick Leveson-Gower	Liberal
1885	Leonard Courtney	Liberal
1886	Leonard Courtney	Liberal Unionist
1900	Sir Lewis Molesworth	Liberal Unionist
1906	Thomas Agar-Robartes	Liberal
1906 by-election	Freeman Freeman-Thomas	Liberal
1910	Cecil Grenfell	Liberal
1910	Sir Reginald Pole-Carew	Liberal Unionist
1916 by-election	Charles Hanson	Coalition Conservative
1922 by-election	Isaac Foot	Liberal
1924	Gerald Harrison	Conservative
1929	Isaac Foot	Liberal
1935	John Rathbone	Conservative
1941 by-election	Beatrice Rathbone (later Wright)	Conservative
1945	Sir Douglas Marshall	Conservative
1964	Peter Bessell	Liberal
1970	Robert Hicks	Conservative
Feb 1974	Paul Tyler	Liberal
Oct 1974	Robert Hicks	Conservative
1983	constituency abolished	

Back to Members of Parliament

== Elections ==
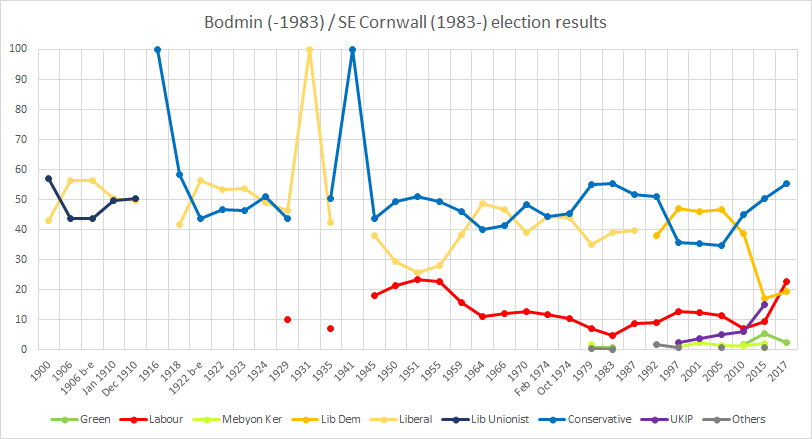
Bodmin // South East Cornwall election results

=== Elections in the 1830s ===
General election 1830: Bodmin (2 seats)
Party	Candidate	Votes	%	±%
Tory	Davies Gilbert	Unopposed		
Tory	Horace Seymour	Unopposed		
Tory hold				
Tory hold				

General election 1831: Bodmin (2 seats)
Party	Candidate	Votes	%	±%
Tory	Davies Gilbert	Unopposed		
Tory	Horace Seymour	Unopposed		
Tory hold				
Tory hold				

General election 1832: Bodmin (2 seats)
Party	Candidate	Votes	%	±%
Whig	William Peter	171	43.7	New
Whig	Samuel Thomas Spry	114	29.2	New
Whig	Charles Vivian	106	27.1	New
Majority		8	1.9	N/A
Turnout		222	88.1	N/A
Registered electors		252		
Whig gain from Tory		Swing	N/A	
Whig gain from Tory		Swing	N/A	

General election 1835: Bodmin (2 seats)
Party	Candidate	Votes	%	±%
Whig	Charles Vivian	170	39.9	+12.8
Whig	Samuel Thomas Spry	138	32.4	+3.2
Conservative	Edward Eliot	118	27.7	New
Majority		20	4.7	+2.8
Turnout		234	74.8	−13.3
Registered electors		313		
Whig hold		Swing	N/A	
Whig hold		Swing	N/A	

General election 1837: Bodmin (2 seats)
Party	Candidate	Votes	%	±%
Whig	Charles Vivian	200	46.7	+6.8
Conservative	Samuel Thomas Spry	130	30.4	+2.7
Whig	Carteret John William Ellis	98	22.9	−9.5
Turnout		250	75.1	+0.3
Registered electors		333		
Majority		70	16.3	+11.6
Whig hold		Swing	+2.7	
Majority		32	7.5	N/A
Conservative gain from Whig		Swing	+2.7	

=== Elections in the 1840s ===
General election 1841: Bodmin (2 seats)
Party	Candidate	Votes	%	±%
Whig	Charles Vivian	224	44.7	−24.9
Conservative	John Townshend	142	28.3	+13.1
Conservative	Samuel Thomas Spry	135	26.9	+11.7
Majority		82	16.4	±0.0
Turnout		227	61.7	−13.4
Registered electors		368		
Whig hold		Swing	−24.9	
Conservative hold		Swing	+12.8	

Vivian succeeded to the peerage, becoming 2nd Baron Vivian and causing a by-election.

By-election, 9 February 1843: Bodmin
Party	Candidate	Votes	%	±%
Conservative	Samuel Thomas Spry	165	50.6	−4.6
Whig	Charles Graves-Sawle	161	49.4	+4.7
Majority		4	1.2	N/A
Turnout		326	80.5	+18.8
Registered electors		405		
Conservative gain from Whig		Swing	−4.7	

General election 1847: Bodmin (2 seats)
Party	Candidate	Votes	%	±%
Radical	James Wyld	297	44.1	N/A
Whig	Henry Lacy	259	38.5	−6.2
Conservative	Samuel Thomas Spry	117	17.4	−37.8
Turnout		337 (est)	83.9 (est)	+22.2
Registered electors		401		
Majority		180	26.7	N/A
Radical gain from Conservative		Swing	N/A	
Majority		142	21.1	+4.7
Whig hold		Swing	+6.4	

Back to elections

=== Elections in the 1850s ===
General election 1852: Bodmin (2 seats)
Party	Candidate	Votes	%	±%
Conservative	William Michell	273	38.2	+29.5
Whig	Charles Graves-Sawle	157	22.0	−16.5
Conservative	William Henderson	149	20.8	+12.1
Radical	Edward Capel Whitehurst	82	11.5	−32.6
Peelite	Henry Carr	54	7.6	N/A
Turnout		358 (est)	97.4 (est)	+13.5
Registered electors		367		
Majority		291	26.7	N/A
Conservative gain from Radical		Swing	+22.9	
Majority		8	1.2	−19.9
Whig hold		Swing	−18.7	

General election 1857: Bodmin (2 seats)
Party	Candidate	Votes	%	±%
Whig	John Vivian	244	38.5	'+16.5
Radical	James Wyld	190	30.0	+18.5
Conservative	William Michell	169	26.7	−11.5
Whig	Harvey Lewis	31	4.9	N/A
Turnout		317 (est)	81.3 (est)	−16.1
Registered electors		390		
Majority		54	8.5	+7.3
Whig hold		Swing	N/A	
Majority		21	3.3	N/A
Radical gain from Conservative		Swing	+15.0	

General election 1859: Bodmin (2 seats)
Party	Candidate	Votes	%	±%
Liberal	Frederick Leveson-Gower	215	37.1	N/A
Conservative	William Michell	198	34.1	+7.4
Liberal	James Wyld	167	28.8	−1.2
Turnout		290 (est)	74.4 (est)	−6.9
Registered electors		390		
Majority		17	3.0	−0.3
Liberal hold		Swing	N/A	
Majority		31	5.3	N/A
Conservative gain from Liberal		Swing	+4.3	

Michell resigned by accepting the office of Steward of the Manor of Northstead, causing a by-election.

By-election, 13 August 1859: Bodmin
Party	Candidate	Votes	%	±%
Liberal	James Wyld	Unopposed		
Liberal gain from Conservative				

Back to elections

=== Elections in the 1860s ===
General election 1865: Bodmin (2 seats)
Party	Candidate	Votes	%	±%
Liberal	Frederick Leveson-Gower	263	42.8	+5.7
Liberal	James Wyld	238	38.7	+9.9
Conservative	Charles Locock Webb	114	18.5	−15.6
Majority		124	20.2	N/A
Turnout		365 (est)	91.8 (est)	+17.4
Registered electors		397		
Liberal hold		Swing	+6.8	
Liberal gain from Conservative		Swing	+8.9	

The seat was reduced to one member for the 1868 election.

General election 1868: Bodmin
Party	Candidate	Votes	%	±%
Liberal	Frederick Leveson-Gower	424	55.9	+13.1
Liberal	James Wyld	334	44.1	+5.4
Majority		90	11.8	−8.4
Turnout		758	85.6	−6.2
Registered electors		886		
Liberal hold		Swing	N/A	

Back to elections

=== Elections in the 1870s ===
General election 1874: Bodmin
Party	Candidate	Votes	%	±%
Liberal	Frederick Leveson-Gower	464	57.5	+1.6
Liberal	Charles Eldon Sargeant	230	28.5	−15.6
Conservative	Charles Locock Webb	113	14.0	New
Majority		234	29.0	+17.2
Turnout		807	84.2	−1.4
Registered electors		959		
Liberal hold		Swing	N/A	

Back to elections

=== Elections in the 1880s ===
General election 1880: Bodmin
Party	Candidate	Votes	%	±%
Liberal	Frederick Leveson-Gower	418	52.7	−4.8
Liberal	James Ross Farquharson	375	47.3	+18.8
Majority		43	5.4	−23.6
Turnout		793	87.8	+3.6
Registered electors		903		
Liberal hold		Swing	−11.8	

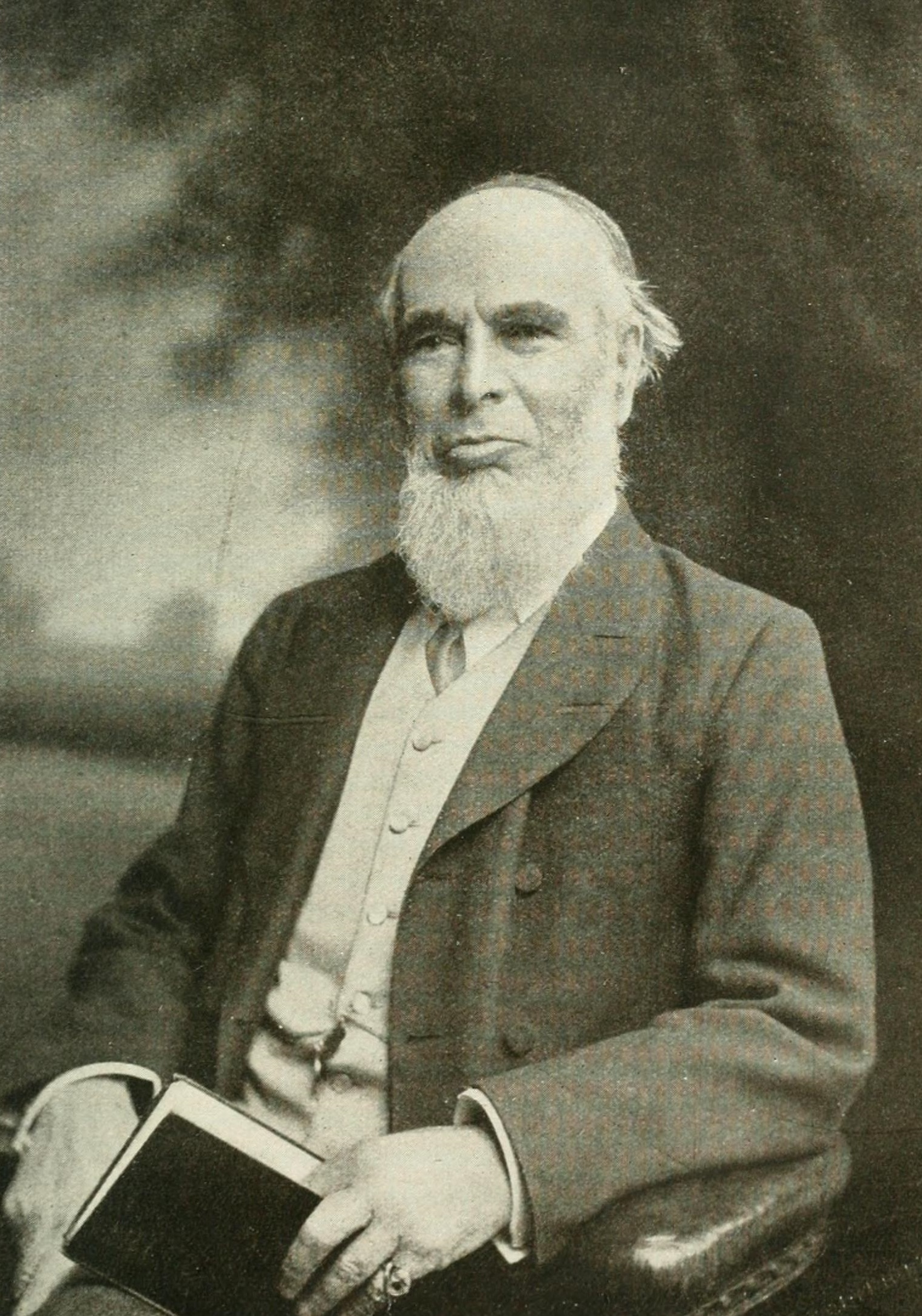
Courtney

General election 1885: Bodmin
Party	Candidate	Votes	%	±%
Liberal	Leonard Courtney	4,254	57.8	+5.1
Conservative	Charles Ernest Edgcumbe	3,101	42.2	New
Majority		1,153	15.6	+10.2
Turnout		7,355	80.3	−7.5
Registered electors		9,158		
Liberal hold		Swing	N/A	

General election 1886: Bodmin
Party	Candidate	Votes	%	±%
Liberal Unionist	Leonard Courtney	3,763	64.2	+22.0
Liberal	John Abraham	2,101	35.8	−22.0
Majority		1,662	28.4	N/A
Turnout		5,864	64.0	−16.3
Registered electors		9,158		
Liberal Unionist gain from Liberal		Swing	+22.0	

Back to elections

=== Elections in the 1890s ===
General election 1892: Bodmin
Party	Candidate	Votes	%	±%
Liberal Unionist	Leonard Courtney	3,809	51.6	−12.6
Liberal	John McDougall	3,578	48.4	+12.6
Majority		231	3.2	−25.2
Turnout		7,387	79.7	+15.7
Registered electors		9,263		
Liberal Unionist hold		Swing	−12.6	

General election 1895: Bodmin
Party	Candidate	Votes	%	±%
Liberal Unionist	Leonard Courtney	4,035	53.6	+2.0
Liberal	John McDougall	3,492	46.4	−2.0
Majority		543	7.2	+4.0
Turnout		7,527	78.3	−1.4
Registered electors		9,607		
Liberal Unionist hold		Swing	+2.0	

Back to elections

=== Elections in the 1900s ===
General election 1900: Bodmin
Party	Candidate	Votes	%	±%
Liberal Unionist	Lewis Molesworth	4,280	56.9	+3.3
Liberal	Thomas Snape	3,248	43.1	−3.3
Majority		1,032	13.8	+6.6
Turnout		7,528	75.1	−3.2
Registered electors		10,026		
Liberal Unionist hold		Swing	+3.3	

Agar-Robartes

General election 1906: Bodmin
Party	Candidate	Votes	%	±%
Liberal	Thomas Agar-Robartes	5,201	56.3	+13.2
Liberal Unionist	H. B. Grylls	4,029	43.7	−13.2
Majority		1,172	12.6	N/A
Turnout		9,230	86.0	+10.9
Registered electors		10,731		
Liberal gain from Liberal Unionist		Swing	+13.2	

1906 Bodmin by-election
Party	Candidate	Votes	%	±%
Liberal	Freeman Freeman-Thomas	4,969	56.2	−0.1
Liberal Unionist	George Sandys	3,876	43.8	+0.1
Majority		1,093	12.4	−0.2
Turnout		8,845	82.4	−3.6
Registered electors		10,731		
Liberal hold		Swing	−0.1	

Back to elections

=== Elections in the 1910s ===
Cecil Grenfell

General election January 1910: Bodmin
Party	Candidate	Votes	%	±%
Liberal	Cecil Grenfell	5,133	50.2	−6.1
Liberal Unionist	Reginald Pole-Carew	5,083	49.8	+6.1
Majority		50	0.4	−12.2
Turnout		10,216	88.4	+2.4
Registered electors		11,553		
Liberal hold		Swing	−6.1	

Isaac Foot

General election December 1910: Bodmin
Party	Candidate	Votes	%	±%
Liberal Unionist	Reginald Pole-Carew	5,021	50.2	+0.4
Liberal	Isaac Foot	4,980	49.8	−0.4
Majority		41	0.4	N/A
Turnout		10,001	86.6	−1.8
Registered electors		11,553		
Liberal Unionist gain from Liberal		Swing	+0.4	

General election 1914–15:

Another general election was required to take place before the end of 1915. The political parties had been making preparations for an election to take place and by July 1914, the following candidates had been selected;

- Unionist: Charles Hanson
- Liberal: Isaac Foot

1916 Bodmin by-election
Party	Candidate	Votes	%	±%
Unionist	Charles Hanson	Unopposed		
Unionist hold				

General election 1918: Bodmin
Party		Candidate	Votes	%	±%
C	Unionist	Charles Hanson	12,228	58.4	+8.2
	Liberal	Isaac Foot	8,705	41.6	−8.2
Majority			3,523	16.8	+16.4
Turnout			20,933	69.1	−17.5
	Unionist hold		Swing	+8.2	
C indicates candidate endorsed by the coalition government.

Back to elections

=== Elections in the 1920s ===
1922 Bodmin by-election: Bodmin
Party		Candidate	Votes	%	±%
	Liberal	Isaac Foot	13,751	56.4	+14.8
C	Unionist	Frederick Poole	10,610	43.6	−14.8
Majority			3.141	12.8	N/A
Turnout			24,361	74.8	+5.7
	Liberal gain from Unionist		Swing	+14.8	
C indicates candidate endorsed by the coalition government.

General election 1922: Bodmin
Party	Candidate	Votes	%	±%
Liberal	Isaac Foot	14,292	53.4	−3.0
Unionist	Frederick Poole	12,467	46.6	+3.0
Majority		1,825	6.8	−6.0
Turnout		26,759	80.4	+5.6
Liberal hold		Swing	−3.0	

General election 1923: Bodmin
Party	Candidate	Votes	%	±%
Liberal	Isaac Foot	14,536	53.6	+0.2
Unionist	Frederick Poole	12,574	46.4	−0.2
Majority		1,962	7.2	+0.4
Turnout		27,110	82.0	+1.6
Liberal hold		Swing	+0.2	

General election 1924: Bodmin
Party	Candidate	Votes	%	±%
Unionist	Gerald Harrison	14,163	51.1	+4.7
Liberal	Isaac Foot	13,548	48.9	−4.7
Majority		615	2.2	N/A
Turnout		27,711	82.4	+0.4
Unionist gain from Liberal		Swing	+4.7	

General election 1929: Bodmin
Party	Candidate	Votes	%	±%
Liberal	Isaac Foot	16,002	46.3	−2.6
Unionist	Gerald Harrison	15,088	43.7	−7.4
Labour	Paul Reed	3,437	10.0	New
Majority		914	2.6	N/A
Turnout		34,527	84.9	+2.5
Liberal gain from Unionist		Swing	+2.4	

Back to elections

=== Elections in the 1930s ===
General election 1931: Bodmin
Party	Candidate	Votes	%	±%
Liberal	Isaac Foot	Unopposed	N/A	N/A
Liberal hold				

General election 1935: Bodmin
Party	Candidate	Votes	%	±%
Conservative	John Rathbone	17,485	50.4	New
Liberal	Isaac Foot	14,732	42.4	N/A
Labour	Harold E. J. Falconer	2,496	7.2	New
Majority		2,753	8.0	N/A
Turnout		34,713	82.3	N/A
Conservative gain from Liberal		Swing	N/A	

General election 1939–40: Another general election was required to take place before the end of 1940. The political parties had been making preparations for an election to take place from 1939 and by the end of this year, the following candidates had been selected;

- Conservative: John Rathbone
- Liberal: John Foot
- Labour: R. H. Baker (withdrew)

Back to elections

=== Elections in the 1940s ===
1941 Bodmin by-election
Party	Candidate	Votes	%	±%
Conservative	Beatrice Rathbone	Unopposed	N/A	N/A
Conservative hold				

General election 1945: Bodmin
Party	Candidate	Votes	%	±%
Conservative	Douglas Marshall	15,396	43.8	−6.6
Liberal	John Foot	13,349	38.0	−4.4
Labour	Jack Hubert Pitts	6,401	18.2	+11.0
Majority		2,047	5.8	−2.2
Turnout		35,146	76.1	−6.2
Conservative hold		Swing		

Back to elections

=== Elections in the 1950s ===
General election 1950: Bodmin
Party	Candidate	Votes	%	±%
Conservative	Douglas Marshall	19,441	49.2	+5.4
Liberal	John Foot	11,649	29.5	–8.5
Labour	William Royle	8,434	21.3	+3.1
Majority		7,792	19.7	+13.9
Turnout		39,524	84.3	+8.2
Conservative hold		Swing		

General election 1951: Bodmin
Party	Candidate	Votes	%	±%
Conservative	Douglas Marshall	20,086	50.9	+1.7
Liberal	T. Stuart Roseveare	10,088	25.6	−3.9
Labour	William Royle	9,244	23.5	+2.2
Majority		9,998	25.3	+5.6
Turnout		39,418	84.6	+0.3
Conservative hold		Swing		

General election 1955: Bodmin
Party	Candidate	Votes	%	±%
Conservative	Douglas Marshall	17,858	49.2	−1.7
Liberal	T. Stuart Roseveare	10,199	28.0	+2.4
Labour	E. Fraser Wilde	8,304	22.8	−0.7
Majority		7,659	21.2	−4.1
Turnout		36,361	79.5	−5.1
Conservative hold		Swing		

General election 1959: Bodmin
Party	Candidate	Votes	%	±%
Conservative	Douglas Marshall	16,853	46.0	−3.2
Liberal	Peter Bessell	14,052	38.3	+10.3
Labour	Thomas F. Mitchell	5,769	15.7	−7.1
Majority		2,801	7.7	−13.5
Turnout		36,674	81.5	+2.0
Conservative hold		Swing		

Back to elections

=== Elections in the 1960s ===
General election 1964: Bodmin
Party	Candidate	Votes	%	±%
Liberal	Peter Bessell	18,046	48.6	+10.3
Conservative	Douglas Marshall	14,910	40.2	−5.8
Labour	Thomas F. Mitchell	4,172	11.2	−4.5
Majority		3,136	8.45	N/A
Turnout		37,128	82.7	+1.2
Liberal gain from Conservative		Swing		

General election 1966: Bodmin
Party	Candidate	Votes	%	±%
Liberal	Peter Bessell	18,144	46.6	−2.0
Conservative	John Gorst	16,121	41.4	+1.2
Labour	Robert Blank	4,674	12.0	+0.8
Majority		2,023	5.2	−3.2
Turnout		38,939	84.4	+1.7
Liberal hold		Swing		

Back to elections

=== Elections in the 1970s ===
General election 1970: Bodmin
Party	Candidate	Votes	%	±%
Conservative	Robert Hicks	20,187	48.3	+6.9
Liberal	Paul Tyler	16,267	38.9	−7.7
Labour	Alfred F. Long	5,350	12.8	+0.8
Majority		3,920	9.4	N/A
Turnout		41,804	80.6	−3.8
Conservative gain from Liberal		Swing		

General election February 1974: Bodmin
Party	Candidate	Votes	%	±%
Liberal	Paul Tyler	20,283	44.2	+5.3
Conservative	Robert Hicks	20,274	44.2	−4.1
Labour	G. Lonsdale	5,328	11.61	−1.2
Majority		9	0.0	N/A
Turnout		45,885	83.3	+2.7
Liberal gain from Conservative		Swing		

General election October 1974: Bodmin
Party	Candidate	Votes	%	±%
Conservative	Robert Hicks	20,756	45.5	+1.3
Liberal	Paul Tyler	20,091	44.0	−0.2
Labour	P. C. Knight	4,814	10.5	−1.1
Majority		665	1.5	N/A
Turnout		45,661	82.3	−1.0
Conservative gain from Liberal		Swing		

General election 1979: Bodmin
Party	Candidate	Votes	%	±%
Conservative	Robert Hicks	27,922	54.9	+9.4
Liberal	Paul Tyler	17,893	35.2	−8.8
Labour	Nigel Knowles	3,508	6.9	−3.6
Mebyon Kernow	Roger Holmes	865	1.7	New
Ecology	C. Retallack	465	0.9	New
National Front	M. Carter	235	0.5	New
Majority		10,029	19.7	+18.2
Turnout		50,023	82.5	+0.2
Conservative hold		Swing		

Back to elections

== Sources ==
- The History of Parliament Trust, Bodmin, Borough from 1386 to 1868
- Leigh Rayment's Historical List of MPs – Constituencies beginning with "B" (part 4)
- D. Brunton & D. H. Pennington, Members of the Long Parliament (London: George Allen & Unwin, 1954)
- Cobbett's Parliamentary History of England, from the Norman Conquest in 1066 to the year 1803 (London: Thomas Hansard, 1808)
- F. W. S. Craig, British Parliamentary Election Results 1832-1885 (2nd edition, Aldershot: Parliamentary Research Services, 1989)
- Craig, F. W. S. (1974-06-18). British Parliamentary Election Results 1885–1918. Springer. ISBN 9781349022984
- Michael Kinnear, The British Voter (London: B. H. Batsford, Ltd, 1968)
- Henry Pelling, Social Geography of British Elections 1885-1910 (London: Macmillan, 1967)
- J. Holladay Philbin, Parliamentary Representation 1832 - England and Wales (New Haven: Yale University Press, 1965)
- Edward Porritt and Annie G. Porritt, The Unreformed House of Commons (Cambridge University Press, 1903)
- Willis, Browne (1750). Notitia Parliamentaria, Part II: A Series or Lists of the Representatives in the several Parliaments held from the Reformation 1541, to the Restoration 1660 ... London. p. 1.
- Frederic A. Youngs Jr, "Guide to the Local Administrative Units of England, Vol I" (London: Royal Historical Society, 1979)
