= Otto Tregonan =

English politician

Otto Tregonan (died 1439), of Tregonan, Cornwall, was an English politician.

He was a member (MP) of the parliament of England for Bodmin in 1410, 1411, November 1414, March 1416, 1417, May 1421 and 1425.
