= Thomas Treffry II =

16th-century English politician

Thomas Treffry (fl. 1545) was an English politician.

He was a member of parliament (MP) for Bodmin in 1545.
