= Thomas Trott =

16th-century English politician

Thomas Trott (by 1483 – 1524 or later), of Bodmin, Cornwall, was an English politician.

He was a Member of Parliament (MP) for Bodmin in 1515.
