= Stranger in blood =

In the law of United States and the Commonwealth, a stranger in blood is someone mentioned in a will (such as a beneficiary) who is not related by blood to the testator. It is therefore the opposite of next of kin.

== Notable instances ==
Suspected serial killer John Bodkin Adams was identified as a 'stranger in blood' in the wills of 132 of his patients.

== Heraldry ==
In heraldry, being a stranger in blood - through adoption for example - is indicated via a 'canton voided'.
