= St Chamond =

St Chamond may refer to:

- Saint Chamond otherwise Annemund, bishop of Lyon
- Saint-Chamond, Loire, a French town named after him
- Saint-Chamond (manufacturer), informal name for the Compagnie des forges et aciéries de la marine et d'Homécourt, a French manufacturer based in the town of Saint-Chamond
- Saint-Chamond (tank)
- Saint-Chamond 75 mm gun
