= Digory Chamond =

English politician

Digory Chamond (died 1611), of Launcells, Cornwall, was an English politician.

He was a member (MP) of the parliament of England for Bodmin in 1559, and sheriff of Cornwall in 1606–7.
