= Francis Browne (MP for Bodmin) =

16th-century English politician

Francis Browne was an English politician.

He was a Member of the Parliament of England (MP) for Bodmin in 1562 and 1563–1567.
