= William Peter =

British diplomat and Whig politician

William Peter (22 March 1788 – 6 February 1853) was a British diplomat and Whig politician who sat in the House of Commons from 1832 to 1835.

Peter was born at Harlyn, St Merryn, Cornwall, the son of Henry Peter and his wife Anna Maria. He was educated at Christ Church, Oxford, receiving BA in 1807 and MA in 1809. He was called to the bar at Lincoln's Inn on 28 May 1813. After a few years in London, he returned to Cornwall where he was a J.P. and deputy lieutenant. He compiled a two-volume set of Speeches of Sir Samuel Romilly in the House of Commons, published in 1820.

At the 1832 general election Peter was elected as member of parliament (MP) for Bodmin, and held the seat until 1835 when he stood down.

In 1840, he was living at Bruges when he received an appointment as HM Consul in Philadelphia USA. In the United States he married Sarah Ann Worthington King, daughter of Ohio Governor and U. S. Senator Thomas Worthington, and widow of Edward King a prominent Ohio politician and son of Minister to Great Britain Rufus King. She died in 1877 in Cincinnati, Ohio. Peter died in Philadelphia at the age of 64 and was buried in St Peter's Churchyard, Philadelphia.

He was elected to the American Philosophical Society in 1841.
