= Hogg (surname) =

Hogg is a Scottish, English or Irish surname.

== Authors and journalism ==
- James Hogg (1770–1835), Scottish poet and novelist
- Thomas Jefferson Hogg (1792–1862), English biographer
- Ian V. Hogg (1926–2002), British military author
- Min Hogg (1939–2019), English journalist and magazine editor

== Entertainment ==
- Viola Wilson Hogg known as Viola Wilson (1911–2002), Scottish soprano
- Ian Hogg (actor) (born 1937), English actor
- Michael Lindsay-Hogg (born 1940), American-born television and stage director
- Joanna Hogg, (born 20 March 1960) English film director and screenwriter
- BJ Hogg (1955–2020) Northern Irish actor and writer
- Joanne Hogg, Irish singer and songwriter

== Politics and government ==
- Samuel E. Hogg (1783–1842), American congressman
- Sir James Hogg, 1st Baronet (1790–1876) Irish-born businessman, lawyer and politician
- James McGarel-Hogg, 1st Baron Magheramorne (1823–1890), British politician born in India
- Sir Stuart Saunders Hogg (1833–1921), Indian-born British civil servant
- Alexander Hogg (1841–1920), New Zealand politician
- Jim Hogg (1851–1906), governor of Texas
- Charles E. Hogg (1852–1935), West Virginia congressman
- James McGarel-Hogg, 2nd Baron Magheramorne (1861–1903), Anglo-Irish Peer
- Dudley McGarel-Hogg, 3rd Baron Magheramorne (1863–1946), Anglo-Irish peer
- Douglas Hogg, 1st Viscount Hailsham (1872–1950), English barrister and Conservative Party politician
- Norman Hogg (politician, born 1907) (1907–1975), Scottish Labour Councillor and Lord Provost of Aberdeen
- Quintin Hogg, Baron Hailsham of St Marylebone (1907–2001), English barrister and Conservative Party politician
- Norman Hogg, Baron Hogg of Cumbernauld (1938–2008), Scottish Labour Party politician
- Caroline Hogg (born 1942), Australian Labor Party politician
- Bob Hogg (born ?, ex-husband of Caroline Hogg), Australian Labor Party politician
- Douglas Hogg, 3rd Viscount Hailsham (born 1945), English barrister and Conservative Party politician
- Sarah Hogg, Baroness Hogg (born 1946), English journalist, economist and Conservative/Crossbench politician
- John Hogg (born 1949), Australian Labor Party politician
- Ron Hogg CBE (1951–2019) - Police and Crime Commissioner of Durham and Labour Party politician
- Rob Hogg (born 1967), Iowa State Senator
- Allen Hogg, Wyoming state representative
- David Hogg (born 2000), American gun control advocate
- Lauren Hogg (born 2003), American gun control advocate

== Scholars and scientists ==
- Robert Hogg (biologist) (1818–1897), Scottish botanist
- Arthur Robert Hogg (1903–1966), Australian physicist and astronomer
- Frank Scott Hogg (1904–1951), Canadian astronomer
- Helen Sawyer Hogg (1905–1993), Canadian astronomer
- Henry Roughton Hogg (1846–1923), English arachnologist
- J. Bernard Hogg (1908–1994), American labour historian
- Robert V. Hogg (1924–2014), American professor of statistics (University of Iowa)
- Peter Hogg (1939–2020), Canadian constitutional scholar
- Richard M. Hogg (1944–2007), Scottish linguist
- Michael Hogg (born 1954), Indian-born British professor of social psychology specialising in social identity theory

== Sports ==
- George Hogg (footballer) (born 1869), Scottish footballer with Heart of Midlothian
- Robert Hogg (footballer) (1877–1963), English footballer with Sunderland and Blackpool
- Billy Hogg (1879–1937), English footballer with Sunderland, Glasgow Rangers, Dundee, and Raith Rovers
- Jack Hogg (1881–1944), English footballer with Southampton
- Bobby Hogg (footballer, born 1914) (1914–1975), Scottish footballer and manager (Celtic, West Bromwich Albion, Cardiff City)
- Sonja Hogg (born 1945), American basketball coach
- Rodney Hogg (born 1951), Australian cricketer
- Vincent Hogg (born 1952), Zimbabwean cricketer
- Graeme Hogg (born 1964), Scottish footballer (Manchester United, Portsmouth, Heart of Midlothian)
- Jeff Hogg (born 1966), Australian rules footballer
- Russell Hogg (1968–2012), Scottish badminton player
- Brad Hogg (born 1971), Australian cricketer
- Ally Hogg (born 1983), Scottish rugby union player
- Kyle Hogg (born 1983), English cricketer
- Steven Hogg (born 1985), English midfield footballer (Shrewsbury Town, Gretna, York City, Salford City)
- Chris Hogg (born 1985), English footballer (Ipswich Town, Hibernian, Inverness Caledonian Thistle, Needham Market)
- Jonathan Hogg (born 1988), English footballer (Aston Villa, Watford, Huddersfield Town)
- Stuart Hogg (born 1992), Scottish rugby union player
- Jessica Hogg (born 1995), Welsh artistic gymnast
- Daniel Hogg (born 2004), English cricketer

== Others ==
- Caroline Hogg, Scottish victim of serial killer Robert Black
- Sir Christopher Hogg (1936–2021), British business executive
- David R. Hogg (born 1958), United States Army officer
- George Hogg (adventurer) (1914–1945), British adventurer in China
- Sir Ian Hogg (Royal Navy officer) (1911–2003), British Navy officer
- Ima Hogg (1882–1975), American philanthropist
- James R. Hogg (1934–2025), United States Navy four star admiral
- John Hogg (martyr) (died 1590), English Catholic priest and martyr
- Joseph L. Hogg, officer in the Confederate States Army
- Kenneth Tasman Hogg (1919–1942), Australian private who was killed in the Ration Truck massacre
- Margaret Hogg (died 1976), British murder victim
- Dame Mary Hogg (born 1947), English High Court judge
- Pam Hogg (died 2025), Scottish fashion designer
- Quintin Hogg (merchant) (1845–1903), English philanthropist

== See also ==
- Ogg (surname)
