= Hogg baronets =

Baronetcy in the Baronetage of the United Kingdom

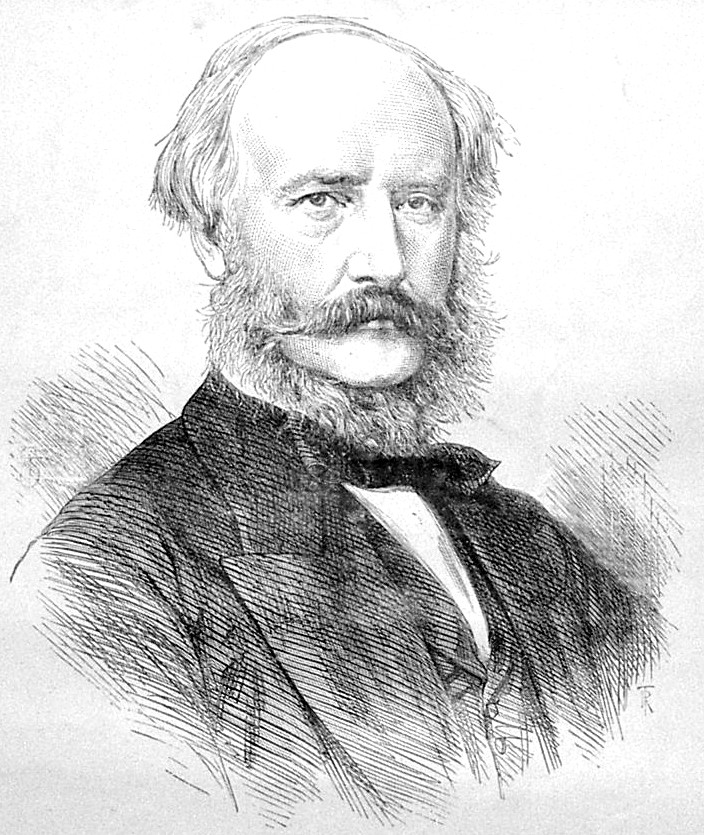
James McGarel-Hogg, 1st Baron Magheramorne

The Hogg baronetcy, of Upper Grosvenor Street in the County of London, is a title in the Baronetage of the United Kingdom. It was created on 20 July 1846 for the lawyer and Conservative politician James Hogg. He was Registrar of the Supreme Court of Judicature and Vice-Admiralty Court in Calcutta for many years and also represented Beverley and Honiton in the House of Commons. His son, the second Baronet, was Chairman of the Metropolitan Board of Works in London from 1870 to 1889. On 5 July 1887 he was created Baron Magheramorne, of Magheramorne in the County of Antrim, in the Peerage of the United Kingdom, as part of the celebrations for the Golden Jubilee of Queen Victoria. The title is pronounced "Marramorn" and derives from a historic site in County Antrim near Larne.

The barony became extinct on the death of the first Baron's third son, the fourth Baron, in 1957, while the baronetcy is extant.

The merchant and philanthropist Quintin Hogg, seventh son of the first Baronet, was the father of The 1st Viscount Hailsham, twice Lord High Chancellor of Great Britain.

== Hogg baronets, of Upper Grosvenor Street (1846) ==
- Sir James Weir Hogg, 1st Baronet (1790–1876)
- Sir James Macnaghten McGarel-Hogg, 2nd Baronet (1823–1890) (created Baron Magheramorne in 1887)

=== Baron Magheramorne (1887) ===
- James Macnaghten McGarel-Hogg, 1st Baron Magheramorne (1823–1890)
- James Douglas McGarel-Hogg, 2nd Baron Magheramorne (1861–1903)
- Dudley Stuart McGarel-Hogg, 3rd Baron Magheramorne (1863–1946)
- Ronald Tracy McGarel-Hogg, 4th Baron Magheramorne (1865–1957)

=== Hogg baronets, of Upper Grosvenor Street (1846; reverted) ===
- Sir Kenneth Weir Hogg, 6th Baronet (1894–1985)
- Sir Arthur Ramsay Hogg, 7th Baronet, MBE (1896–1995)
- Sir Michael David Hogg, 8th Baronet (1925–2001)
- Sir Piers Michael James Hogg, 9th Baronet (born 1957)

The heir apparent is the present holder's only son, James Edward Hogg (born 1985).

=== Title succession chart ===
Title succession chart, Hogg baronets and Barons Magheramorne.

Sir James Hogg; 1st Baronet; 1790–1876
Baron Magheramorne
James McGarel-Hogg; 1st Baron Magheramorne; 2nd Baronet; 1823–1890 | Charles Hogg; 1824–1870
James McGarel-Hogg; 2nd Baron Magheramorne; 1861–1903 | Dudley McGarel-Hogg; 3rd Baron Magheramorne; 1863–1946 | Ronald McGarel-Hogg; 4th Baron Magheramorne; 1865–1957 | Hon. Arthur McGarel-Hogg; 1866–1945 | Hon. Gerald McGarel-Hogg; 1868–1942 | Guy Hogg; 1861–1943 | Ernest Hogg; 1863–1907
Barony extinct
Sir Kenneth Hogg; 6th Baronet; 1894–1985 | Sir Arthur Hogg; 7th Baronet; 1896–1995
Sir Michael Hogg; 8th Baronet; 1925–2001
Sir Piers Hogg; 9th Baronet born 1957
James Hogg born 1985

=== Line of succession ===
- Rt. Hon. Sir James Weir Hogg, 1st Baronet (1790–1876)
  - James MacNaghten McGarel-Hogg, 1st Baron Magheramorne, 2nd Baronet (1823–1890)
    - James Douglas McGarel-Hogg, 2nd Baron Magheramorne, 3rd Baronet (1861–1903)
    - Dudley Stuart McGarel-Hogg, 3rd Baron Magheramorne, 4th Baronet (1863–1946)
    - Ronald Tracey McGarel-Hogg, 4th Baron Magheramorne, 5th Baronet (1863–1957)
  - Charles Swinton Hogg (1824–1870)
    - Guy Weir Hogg (1861–1943)
      - Sir Kenneth Weir Hogg, 6th Baronet (1894–1985)
    - Ernest Charles Hogg (1863–1907)
      - Sir Arthur Ramsay Hogg, 7th Baronet (1896–1995)
        - Sir Michael David Hogg, 8th Baronet (1925–2001)
          - Sir Piers Michael James Hogg, 9th Baronet (born 1957)
            - (1) James Edward Hogg (born 1985)
          - (2) Adam Charles Hogg (born 1958)
            - (3) Daniel Richard Hogg (born 1988)
          - (4) Oliver John Hogg (born 1961)
        - Mark Arthur Philip Hogg (1928–2002)
          - (5) Stephen Mark Hogg (born 1960)
        - (6) Simon Charles Hogg (born 1936)
  - Quintin Hogg (1845–1903)
    - Douglas McGarel Hogg, 1st Viscount Hailsham (1872–1950)
      - Quintin McGarel Hogg, 2nd Viscount Hailsham (title disclaimed), Baron Hailsham of St. Marylebone (1907–2001)
        - (7) Douglas Martin Hogg, 3rd Viscount Hailsham, Baron Hailsham of Kettlethorpe (born 1945)
          - (1,8) Hon. Quintin John Neil Martin Hogg (born 1973)
        - (2,9) Hon. James Richard Martin Hogg (born 1951)
    - Sir Malcolm Nicholson Hogg (1883–1978)
      - Sir John Nicholson Hogg (1912–1999)
        - (10) Malcolm David Nicholson Hogg (born 1949)
          - (11) Richard John Nicholson Hogg (born 1982)

== See also ==
- Viscount Hailsham
