= James Hogg (disambiguation) =

James Hogg (1770–1835) was a Scottish poet and novelist.

James Hogg may also refer to:

- Sir James Hogg, 1st Baronet (1790–1876), Registrar of the Supreme Court of Judicature and Vice-Admiralty Court in Calcutta
- James Hogg (publisher) (1806–1888), Scottish publisher
- Jim Hogg (1851–1906), Governor of Texas, lawyer and statesman
  - Statue of Jim Hogg, sculpture
- James Hogg (cricketer) (1906–1975), Australian cricketer
- James Wilson Hogg (1909–1997), New Zealand-born headmaster in Australia
- James R. Hogg (born 1934), United States Navy admiral
- James C. Hogg (born 1935), Canadian physician
- James Hogg (footballer), Scottish footballer
- Jimmy Hogg, Scottish footballer

== See also ==
- James McGarel-Hogg (disambiguation)
- James Hogge (1873–1928), British social researcher and politician
