= Arthur Hogg =

Arthur Hogg may refer to:

- Arthur Hogg (cricketer), English cricketer
- Arthur Robert Hogg (1903–1966), Australian physicist and astronomer
- Sir Arthur Hogg, 7th Baronet (1896–1995)

== See also ==
- Hogg (surname)
