= OGG =

OGG or ogg may refer to:

== Arts, media and entertainment ==
- Ogg (Cro character), in the Children's Television Workshop animated television show
- Operation Good Guys (OGG), a British TV mockumentary series
- Nanny Ogg, a character in the Discworld series of books
- Ogging, an online computer gaming tactic popularized by the network game Netrek

== Organizations ==
- Original Gospel Gangstaz, Christian hip hop group
- Oxford Geology Group, a British geological society

== Places ==
- Ogg, Texas
- Kahului Airport's IATA code

== Science and technology ==
- Ogg, a multimedia container file format, in computing
- Ogg Vorbis, the Vorbis free software/open source audio codec, commonly used with the Ogg container
- Oxoguanine glycosylase, a DNA glycosylase enzyme

== Others ==
- Ogg (surname)
- Oud Gereformeerde Gemeenten, a pietistic Reformed denomination in the Netherlands

== See also ==
- Oggy (disambiguation)
