= Quintin Hogg =

Quintin Hogg may refer to:

- Quintin Hogg (merchant) (1845–1903), English merchant and philanthropist
- Quintin Hogg, Baron Hailsham of St Marylebone (1907–2001), his grandson, English politician and Lord Chancellor, 1970–1974, 1979–1987
