= Hogg =

Hogg may refer to:

Persons with the surname Hogg:

- Hogg (surname)

In fiction:

- Boss Hogg from the television show Dukes of Hazzard, with many fictional Hogg relatives
- Wernham Hogg, the fictional paper company from the British TV series The Office
- Hogg (novel), a novel by Samuel R. Delany

Other:

- Head on, gilled and gutted, a term used in the fishing industry.
- Hogg Robinson Group (HRG), an international company specializing in corporate services
- Hogg (crater), on the Moon
- Hogg, a young sheep of either sex from about 9 to 18 months of age (until it cuts two teeth).
- Jim Hogg County, Texas
