= Murder of Ellie Butler =

2013 murder in the United Kingdom

Ellie Butler
- Born: Ellie Butler; 30 December 2006
- Died: 28 October 2013 (aged 6)
- Cause of death: Beating
- Known for: Murder victim

Ellie Butler (30 December 2006 – 28 October 2013) was a British girl who was murdered by her father, Ben Butler, on 28 October 2013, at his home in Sutton, London. In February 2007, he was arrested after Ellie Butler was taken to a hospital with head and retinal injuries. Ellie then lived with her maternal grandparents until late 2012, when a judge, Mrs Justice Mary Hogg, ordered she be returned to her parents.

== Imprisonment of both parents for child cruelty ==
On 21 June 2016, Ben Butler was found guilty of murder at the Old Bailey in London, and sentenced to a minimum of 23 years in prison. His partner and Ellie's mother, Jennie Gray, was jailed for 42 months in connection with the case, after admitting perverting the course of justice, and both were found guilty of child cruelty.

== Serious Case Review ==
In the wake of Ellie's death and before the trial of Ben Butler and Jennie Gray, Sutton Safeguarding Children Board (SCCB) conducted a Serious Case Review into Ellie Butler's death. Beyond furnishing the Serious Case Review with necessary court orders, Hogg and other members of the judiciary refused to cooperate with it.

The report of the Serious Case Review was published on 21 June 2016, immediately after Ben Butler's conviction. Launching the Report, Christine Davies, the Chair of SCCB, said:

"The serious case review concluded that the Family Court’s decision to exonerate Ben Butler of harming Ellie in 2007, combined with its subsequent order for agencies to be sent a letter to that effect, had a very significant impact on how agencies could protect his children from that point in time onwards.

"Ben Butler’s exoneration and the Judge’s statement about him being a victim of a miscarriage of justice had the effect of handing all the power to the parents."

Hogg refused to comment on the conviction outcome and retired from the High Court shortly afterwards.

== See also ==
- Louise Porton – British woman who murdered her two children in 2018
