= Stuart Hogg (disambiguation) =

Stuart Hogg may refer to:

- Stuart Hogg (born 1992), Scottish rugby player
- Stuart Saunders Hogg (1833–1921), British civil servant
- Sir Stuart Hogg Market, now known as New Market, Kolkata
