= James McGarel-Hogg =

James McGarel-Hogg may refer to:

- James McGarel-Hogg, 1st Baron Magheramorne (1823–1890), British politician, Member of Parliament, and local government leader
- James McGarel-Hogg, 2nd Baron Magheramorne (1861–1903), Anglo-Irish peer
