= Malcolm Hogg =

English banker and member of the Council of India

Sir Malcolm Nicholson Hogg (17 January 1883 – 14 February 1948) was an English banker and a member of the Council of India from 1920 to 1925.

Hogg was the youngest child of the prominent London merchant Quintin Hogg. He was educated at Eton College and Balliol College, Oxford and then joined the bankers Forbes, Forbes, Campbell & Co in 1904, going out to their Bombay office the following year and later becoming a partner. He spent much of the rest of his life in India, serving as deputy chairman and then chairman of the Bombay Chamber of Commerce, which he represented on the provincial legislature, and serving on the Viceroy's Council from 1917 to 1919 and the Council of India from 1920 to 1925. He later became joint deputy chairman of the Westminster Bank.

He was knighted in the 1920 New Year Honours for his services to India.

Hogg's elder brother was Douglas Hogg, 1st Viscount Hailsham and his nephew was Quintin Hogg, Baron Hailsham of St Marylebone. Both served as Lord Chancellor. Hogg's grandfather Sir James Hogg had also served on the Council of India.
