= Ethel Wood =

Ethel Wood may refer to:

- Ethel Shakespear (1871–1946), née Wood, English geologist, public servant and philanthropist
- Ethel Mary Wood (1876–1970), philanthropist
