= Ethel Mary Wood =

English businesswoman and feminist (1877–1970)

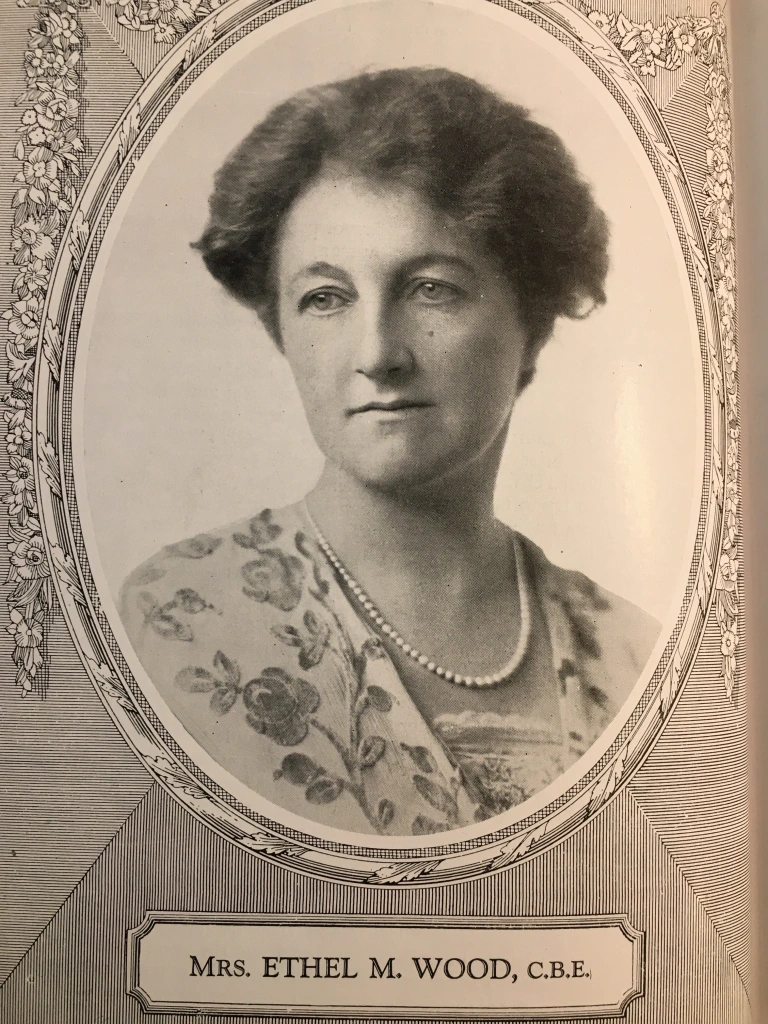
- in 1926 in Advertising World
- Born: 29 June 1877; London, England
- Died: 29 June 1970 (aged 93); London
- Occupation: Advertising executive

Ethel Mary Wood CBE born Ethel Mary Hogg (29 June 1877 – 29 June 1970) was an advertising executive, feminist campaigner, philanthropist and collector of bibles. She was the daughter of Quintin Hogg, a businessman who established the Regent Street Polytechnic. Wood inherited her father's strong religious convictions and philanthropy, serving with the London War Pensions Committee, the Winter Distress League and as governor of the Regent Street Polytechnic.

== Biography ==
Ethel Mary Hogg was born in London, on 29 June 1877 to Quintin Hogg and his wife Alice Anna. Both her brother, Douglas McGarel Hogg, and her nephew, Quintin McGarel Hogg, would go on to be Lord Chancellors. Her family were well connected. She wrote a biography of her father in 1904 and she married Herbert (Bertie) Frederick Wood, a captain in the British army, in 1907.

Wood was an organizer for the Soldiers' and Sailors' Family Association (SSFA), and when World War I broke out she became manager of the London office of the Association. In 1915 she acted effectively as the chief executive officer of the new London War Pensions Committee, running the roughly 700 men and women helping in general welfare efforts for disabled men and families of soldiers and sailors. For this work she was made a C.B.E. in 1920.

Wood's husband, who had survived the war, died of influenza in 1918 and she became a single mother to her daughter Clemency Meara. She joined various feminist causes and business ventures, and was appointed to the board of directors of the advertising agency Samson Clark & Co., later owning 20% of the company. She also chaired the Ministry of Labour's domestic service committee in 1923, and the executive committee of the Winter Distress League, and she was a member of the Food Council, setting on an advisory committee to the Milk Marketing Board. She left advertising in 1928 however, becoming involved with the Institute of Scientific Management, and became General Secretary of the British-based Management Research Group in 1932. She wrote two books on her father's Polytechnic in 1932 and 1934, joined the governing body in 1945, and she wrote a history of the organization in 1965.

Among her work for feminist causes, she was a founding member and honorary secretary of the Women's Provisional Club (WPC) for business and professional women, secretary of the British Federation of Business and Professional Women's Clubs where she worked closely with Caroline Haslett, and honorary secretary of the Committee on Woman Power. She also wrote supporting the cause, including Mainly for Men (1943), which argued that "the war crisis has simply underlined the archaic attitude towards women and the deliberate restriction of opportunities in many fields of activity" and Pilgrimage of Perseverance (1949), a history of the women's emancipation movement.

== Bible collection ==
Wood endowed an annual lecture on the English Bible in 1947 at King's College, now known as the Ethel M. Wood lecture. She started collecting Bibles in earnest in 1936. Her notebook records the purchase of a 1550 edition of Coverdale's Bible as follows: "This was my first old Bible, bought purely out of interest, but the joy & benefit I found in studying it inspired me with the desire to possess a copy of every English translation & so started my 'collection'."

Over the next fourteen years Wood acquired an impressive library of English bibles and books on biblical studies, through purchase (from the likes of Foyles, Sotheby's and Maggs), gifts (from, for example, the bibliographer Tim Munby), and chance (she found a 1592 Geneva Bible at Roehampton Priory). Wood acquired several exceptional volumes formerly owned by the famous Bible collector Francis Fry through the 1937 Sotheby's sale of the library of H. H. Gibbs, Lord Aldenham, and her notebook records, with evident satisfaction, how much less she paid for them than Gibbs. In 1950 Wood deposited her collection in Senate House Library. Supplemented by additional volumes, her donation became a bequest upon her death in 1970.

== Death ==
She died in London, on 29 June 1970.
