= Dudley McGarel-Hogg, 3rd Baron Magheramorne =

Anglo-Irish noble (1863-1946)

The Right Honourable The Lord Magheramorne
- Born: Dudley Stuart Hogg; 3 December 1863
- Died: 14 March 1946 (aged 82); Banstead, Surrey, England
- Resting place: Brompton Cemetery
- Education: Radley College
- Political party: Conservative party Unionist
- Parents: James McGarel-Hogg (father); Caroline Elizabeth Emma Douglas-Pennant (mother)
- Relatives: Edward Douglas-Pennant (maternal grandfather); James McGarel-Hogg (brother); George Douglas-Pennant (uncle)

Dudley Stuart McGarel Hogg, 3rd Baron Magheramorne (3 December 1863 – 14 March 1946) was an Anglo-Irish peer.

== Early life ==
He was the second son of James McGarel-Hogg, 1st Baron Magheramorne, and the Hon. Caroline Elizabeth Emma Douglas-Pennant (c. 1834–1924). Among his siblings were sister Hon. Edith Mary McGarel-Hogg (who married Hon. Arthur Saumarez, a son of the 3rd Baron de Saumarez), Dudley Stuart McGarel-Hogg, Ronald Tracey McGarel-Hogg, Hon. Archibald Campbell McGarel-Hogg (an architect), and Hon. Gerald Francis McGarel-Hogg (a Lieutenant in the 4th Battalion, Royal Welch Fusiliers).

His paternal grandparents were Sir James Weir Hogg, 1st Baronet, and the former Mary Swinton. His maternal grandparents were Edward Gordon Douglas-Pennant, 1st Baron Penrhyn and Juliana Isabella Mary Dawkins-Pennant (a daughter of George Hay Dawkins-Pennant).

He was educated at Radley College.

== Career ==
He inherited the peerage from his brother in 1903. Like his father, Magheramorne was a Conservative and Unionist.

== Personal life ==
In later life he retired to Bournemouth and was living in a nursing home in Banstead, Surrey at the time of his death. He is buried in Brompton Cemetery. The peerage was inherited by his brother.

Peerage of the United Kingdom
Preceded by James Douglas McGarel-Hogg	Baron Magheramorne; 1903–1946	Succeeded by Ronald Tracy McGarel-Hogg
