= Hogg (crater) =

Crater on the Moon

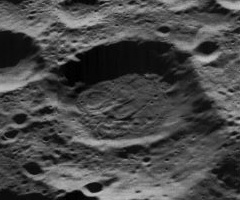
- Oblique Lunar Orbiter 5 image, facing west
- Coordinates: 33.6°N 121.9°E
- Diameter: 38 km
- Depth: Unknown
- Colongitude: 239° at sunrise
- Eponym: Arthur R. Hogg; Frank S. Hogg

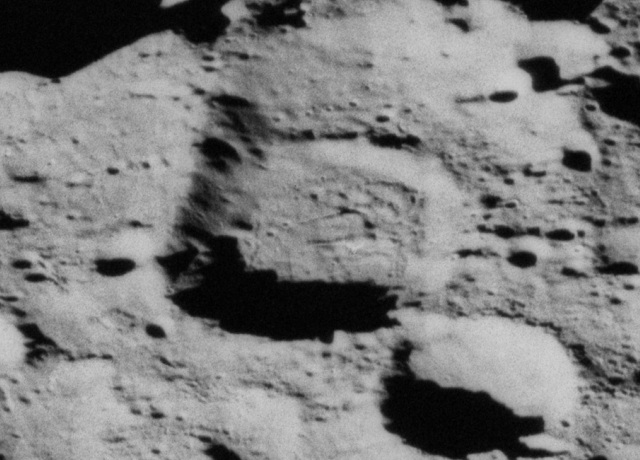
Oblique Apollo 16 mapping camera image

Hogg is a lunar impact crater on the Moon's far side. It lies less than a crater diameter to the south-southwest of the somewhat larger Kidinnu. This is an old, worn feature with an outer rim that has been eroded to the point where it just forms a rounded crest about the interior. Small craterlets lie along the southern and western rim. The interior has some slight clefts in the surface and a low, crater-like depression in the southern half.

== Satellite craters ==
By convention these features are identified on lunar maps by placing the letter on the side of the crater midpoint that is closest to Hogg.

Hogg	Latitude	Longitude	Diameter
E	34.1° N	124.9° E	21 km
K	31.1° N	123.5° E	19 km
P	32.5° N	121.4° E	26 km
T	33.9° N	119.0° E	27 km
