= Mary Hogg =

British judge

Dame Mary Claire Hogg, DBE (born 15 January 1947) is a British lawyer and former High Court judge. She is the daughter of Quintin Hogg, Baron Hailsham of St Marylebone, and his wife, Mary Evelyn Martin, and is the sister of Douglas Hogg. She retired from the High Court in 2016.

Educated at St Paul's Girls' School, she was appointed a Queen's Counsel in 1989. In 1995, she was named a judge of the High Court of Justice where she sat in the Family Division. At the time of her appointment she was only the seventh female High Court judge.

In 1995 she was awarded an honorary doctorate of law (LLD) by the University of Westminster, an institution founded by her great-grandfather Quintin Hogg.

== Cases ==
Hogg caused controversy in 1996 when she ruled that a pregnant woman could be held in hospital against her will and forced to have her baby by Caesarean section. The woman had wanted to give birth naturally, but was advised by doctors that both she and the child were likely to die as she was suffering from pre-eclampsia. The ruling was later overturned at the Court of Appeal, which ruled that a pregnant woman could refuse medical help even if doing so risked her baby's life.

Disappeared British girl Madeleine McCann was made a ward of court, during summer 2007, on application by her parents. During a court hearing on 7 July 2008 Hogg made an extraordinary plea to Madeleine's abductor to "show mercy and compassion" and reveal her whereabouts.

=== Murder of Ellie Butler ===
In March 2009, Ben Butler, who had a series of convictions for violent offences, was convicted and jailed for causing grievous bodily harm to his daughter, Ellie, a conviction which was overturned at the Court of Appeal. At subsequent custody proceedings, despite the opposition of social services, Hogg exonerated Butler and returned the daughter to her parents. Less than a year after his release, Butler went on to kill his six-year-old daughter Ellie. The girl's school, Avenue Primary, had concerns about her welfare prior to her death but were unable to involve local authority social services as Hogg had ordered that social services should no longer be involved with the family. She was ultimately responsible for the death of that child.

Sutton Safeguarding Children Board (SSCB) conducted a Serious Case Review into Ellie Butler's death. Beyond furnishing the Serious Case Review with necessary court orders, Hogg and other members of the judiciary refused to cooperate with it, an attitude that was condemned by a former president of the Association of Directors of Children's Services and the independent chair of the Sutton Safeguarding Board.

The report of the Serious Case Review was published in June 2016. Launching the Report, Christine Davies, the Chair of SSCB, said:

"The serious case review concluded that the Family Court’s decision to exonerate Ben Butler of harming Ellie in 2007, combined with its subsequent order for agencies to be sent a letter to that effect, had a very significant impact on how agencies could protect his children from that point in time onwards.

"Ben Butler’s exoneration and the Judge’s statement about him being a victim of a miscarriage of justice had the effect of handing all the power to the parents."

== Arms ==
Coat of arms of Mary Hogg
Notes Displayed on the wall of Lincoln's Inn Great Hall. Escutcheon Argent three boars' heads erased Azure langued Gules between two flaunches also Azure each charged with a crescent of the field. Orders Order of the British Empire
