= Oggy =

Oggy, Ogie or Oggie may refer to:

- Cornish pasty, also called oggy or oggie in the Westcountry of England
- Ogie Alcasid (born 1967), Filipino singer-songwriter
- Ogie Diaz (born 1970), Filipino actor and comedian
- Oggy and the Cockroaches, a franchise and the name of a long-running popular animated slapstick series
  - Oggy Oggy, a spinoff focusing on Oggy made for younger audiences
  - Oggy and the Cockroaches: Next Generation, a reboot of the original series for the same age range as the original (around 6 to 14)
- Steve Ogrizovic (born 1957), Coventry City goalkeeper, also known as Oggy

== See also ==
- Oggy Oggy Oggy, a British chant
- Aussie Aussie Aussie, Oi Oi Oi
