= Frank Scott Hogg =

Canadian astronomer

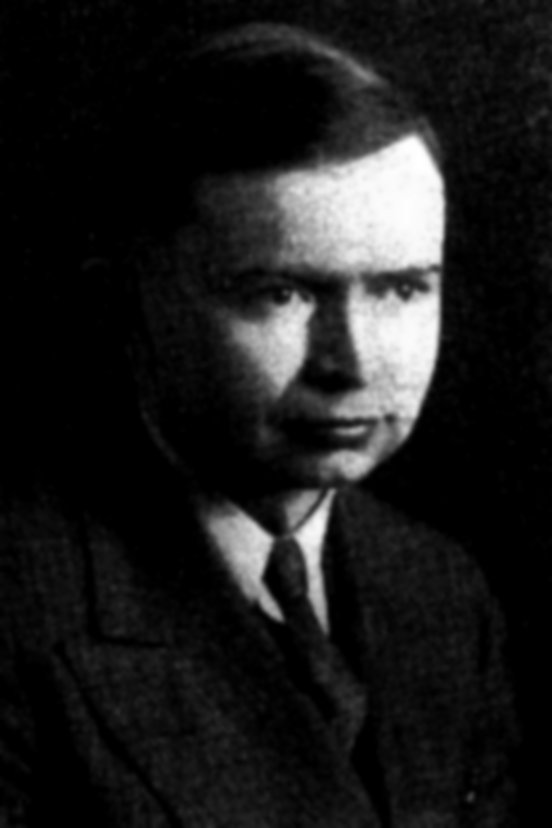
Frank Scott Hogg

Frank Scott Hogg (July 26, 1904 – January 1, 1951) was a Canadian astronomer. Hogg was born in Preston, Ontario to Dr. James Scott Hogg and Ida Barberon. After earning an undergraduate degree from the University of Toronto, Hogg received the second doctorate in astronomy awarded at Harvard University in 1929 where he pioneered in the study of spectrophotometry of stars and of spectra of comets. His supervisor there was Cecilia Payne-Gaposchkin. During World War II, he developed a two-star sextant for air navigation. He was the head of the Department of Astronomy at the University of Toronto and director of the David Dunlap Observatory from 1946 until his death. During this time he pursued the observatory's major research program to study the motions of faint stars in the line of sight. He was married to fellow astronomer Helen Sawyer Hogg from 1930 until his death from a heart attack in 1951. The crater Hogg on the moon is co-named for him and Arthur Robert Hogg.
