= James McGarel-Hogg, 2nd Baron Magheramorne =

Anglo-Irish peer

The Right Honourable The Lord Magheramorne
- Born: James Douglas Hogg; 16 January 1861; London, England
- Died: 10 March 1903 (aged 42); Paris, France
- Spouse: Lady Evelyn Harriet Ashley-Cooper (m. 1889; died 1903)
- Children: Hon. Norah Evelyn McGarel-Hogg
- Parents: James McGarel-Hogg (father); Hon. Caroline Elizabeth Emma Douglas-Pennant (mother)
- Relatives: Edward Douglas-Pennant (grandfather); Dudley McGarel-Hogg (brother); George Douglas-Pennant (uncle)

James Douglas McGarel-Hogg, 2nd Baron Magheramorne (16 January 1861 – 10 March 1903), was an Ulster-Scots peer.

== Early life ==
McGarel-Hogg was born in London, the son of James Macnaghten McGarel-Hogg, 1st Baron Magheramorne, and the Hon. Caroline Elizabeth Emma Douglas-Pennant (c. 1834–1924). Among his siblings were sister Hon. Edith Mary McGarel-Hogg (who married Hon. Arthur Saumarez, a son of the 3rd Baron de Saumarez), Dudley Stuart McGarel-Hogg, Ronald Tracey McGarel-Hogg, Hon. Archibald Campbell McGarel-Hogg (an architect), and Hon. Gerald Francis McGarel-Hogg (a Lieutenant in the 4th Battalion, Royal Welch Fusiliers).

His paternal grandparents were Sir James Weir Hogg, 1st Baronet, and the former Mary Swinton. His maternal grandparents were Edward Gordon Douglas-Pennant, 1st Baron Penrhyn and Juliana Isabella Mary Dawkins-Pennant (a daughter of George Hay Dawkins-Pennant).

== Career ==
He served as a Lieutenant in the Derbyshire Yeomanry Cavalary and was an officer in the 1st Life Guards, rising to the rank of captain. He served as aide-de-camp to the Earl of Aberdeen when he was Lord Lieutenant of Ireland.

Lord Magheramorne lived a dissolute life, and was unsuccessful in business. He was declared bankrupt on 23 November 1900 in Dublin.

== Personal life ==
On 23 October 1889, the year before he inherited the peerage, McGarel-Hogg was married to Lady Evelyn Harriet Ashley-Cooper, the second daughter of Anthony Ashley-Cooper, 8th Earl of Shaftesbury and Lady Harriet Chichester (a daughter of the 3rd Marquess of Donegall). Together, they were the parents of:

- Hon. Norah Evelyn McGarel-Hogg (1890–1967), who married Lt.-Col. Edward Julian Groves-McGarel, son of Col. John Edward Trimble Groves, in 1919. They divorced in 1933.

Lord Magheramorne died in Paris on 10 March 1903. The peerage was inherited by his brother, Dudley. His widow remarried The Hon. Hugo Baring, younger son of The 1st Baron Revelstoke, on 1 March 1905. As he was the only one of his brothers to marry, upon the death of Ronald, the barony created for his father became extinct, while the baronetcty passed to a cousin.

Peerage of the United Kingdom
Preceded by James Macnaghten McGarel-Hogg	Baron Magheramorne; 1890–1903	Succeeded by Dudley Stuart McGarel-Hogg
