= James Hogg (cricketer) =

Australian cricketer

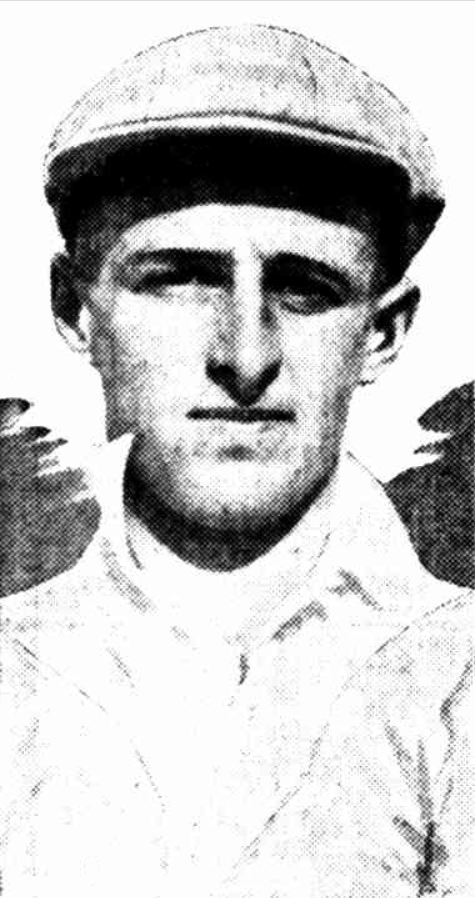

Personal information
- Born: 16 October 1906; Goulburn, New South Wales, Australia
- Died: 2 December 1975 (aged 69); West Ryde, New South Wales, Australia
- Source: ESPNcricinfo, 31 December 2016

James Hogg (16 October 1906 – 2 December 1975) was an Australian cricketer. He played nine first-class matches for New South Wales and Queensland between 1926/27 and 1931/32.

== See also ==
- List of New South Wales representative cricketers
- List of Queensland first-class cricketers
