= Charles McGarel =

Irish merchant and planter (1788–1876)

Charles McGarel (1788–1876) was an Irish merchant and planter of Ulster Scots descent. In 1833, the British Government abolished slavery and compensated owners, such as McGarel, who became a major beneficiaries of this scheme. With his wealth he conducted business in the City of London, funded civic works in his home town of Larne, County Antrim and bought land and property in Ireland. Having no children, he left his estate to his brother-in-law, James Hogg, on condition that he integrate McGarel into his family name, becoming James McGarel-Hogg, later Lord Magheramorne.

== Early years ==
McGarel (or M'Garel) came from Larne, County Antrim. His parents, innkeepers Hannah and Charles McGarel, had six children, four boys and two girls. As young men the brothers travelled to Demerara in South America, where the economy of the area was based on the use of slave labour to produce coffee, cotton and sugar. In 1808, aged about twenty, McGarel was working as a partner in a mercantile business importing goods from Britain and later property dealing involving sale of slaves. His elder brother, John, had been in Demerara since 1799 and another brother, William, died there in 1810.

== Moving to Britain ==
The McGarel brothers moved to Great Britain in about 1817. John, perhaps singled out as someone unused to city life, was subjected to a blackmail attempt by a trickster in London. The perpetrator was arrested, tried and sentenced to death for attempting to obtain £20. Charles went into partnership in the City of London with Alexander and David Hall in a business called Hall, McGarel at 7 Austin Friars. They acted as agents/attorneys for plantation owners and provided loans and mortgages. In addition to the sale of plantations, buildings and crops, the partners were involved with the sale of slaves. Alexander Hall left the business and was replaced by David's son Alexander Hall Hall (the double name was a result of a clerical error at his baptism). McGarel invested in various commercial and business activities including railroads and iron/coal workings in Wales. Not all of his investment went well: he was a Mexican Bond holder during a period when the government of that country defaulted on payments, and some of his railway shares gave poor returns.

== Slavery abolition – compensation to the slave-owners ==
In 1826 Lord Bathurst, Britain's Colonial Secretary of State, attempted to force compulsory manumission on Demerara. The administrative body in Demerara – the Court of Policy – refused to comply and they were supported by the plantation owners who submitted a petition to the Crown. McGarel was one of the five signatories of this document that helped to thwart Bathurst's plan. However, in 1833 the Slavery Abolition Act was passed that stated:

WHEREAS divers Persons are holden in Slavery within divers of His Majesty's Colonies, and it is just and expedient that all such Persons should be manumitted and set free, and that a reasonable Compensation should be made to the Persons hitherto entitled to the Services of such Slaves for the Loss which they will incur by being deprived of their Right to such Services

— The Slavery Abolition Act 28th August 1833.

A compensation fund of £20 million was set aside for slave-owners by the British Government, estimated to be the equivalent of 40% of the national budget. £15 million of this was raised in the form of a loan. Slave owners, who believed they were entitled to compensation, made claims that were then checked by a Slave Compensation Commission. The value depended on factors such as gender, age and skill levels of individual slaves. These claims were then validated in the colonies. Some claims were duplicated, making the process even more protracted and could lead to litigation. It took many years for all of the claims to be processed. The three McGarel brothers, Charles, John and Peter, all received compensation with Charles being the largest recipient. Some of these payments were shared with his partners or other claimants.

== Hogg family ==
In 1856 McGarel, who was 68, married 28 year old Mary Rosina Hogg, daughter of Sir James Weir Hogg, an Irishman, who like McGarel was from County Antrim. One of Mary's fourteen siblings was brother Quinton Hogg. McGarel, who was childless, took an interest in Quinton's career and initially found him a position with sugar merchants Bosanquet, Curtis & Co., where he became a partner. McGarel sent him to Demerara where he helped develop more efficient processes for extracting sugar from the cane. Hogg, who had witnessed the suffering of the poor in London, also provided welfare facilities for the plantation workers. He later returned to England and continued his philanthropic work in education for the poor.

McGarel's brothers and sisters had few children, only his sister Catherine had one surviving daughter, Mary Allen, who married Sir James Murray, discoverer of Milk of Magnesia. McGarel chose to leave his estate to another of his wife's brothers, James Hogg, with the proviso that he include McGarel in his family name.

== Larne, Co. Antrim ==
McGarel paid for the construction of several buildings and other works in his home town of Larne, Ireland. These included Larne Town Hall, built at a cost of about £5500. It was opened in 1870 for use by all denominations as a news-room, library and town hall. He also funded ten almshouses for the needy (removed 1971), and donated land for a new cemetery in 1862.

McGarel became a land owner and landlord in Antrim when in 1842 he purchased the Magheramorne estate from John Irving, M.P. for Antrim. He was initially an "absentee landlord" but took residence in 1844 at the beginning of a period that came to be known in Ireland as the Great Famine. Blight in the subsistence potato crop throughout the land led to mass starvation, followed by fever and disease. The death toll in Ireland during this period has been estimated at 1 million people. Tenant farmers, who were unable to pay their rents, were often evicted and many emigrated with their families. The Ulster area of Ireland was not so badly affected, but McGarel's tenants still struggled to meet their commitments and in 1849 petitioned him for a 50% rent reduction, which McGarel granted. It was also reported at this time that McGarel had been providing barrels of lime for his tenants to use on their land from his Magheramorne lime quarry. It is not clear if he reduced the rent on a regular basis, but in 1875 he announced another 50% half-year rent reduction for "his loyal and contented tenancy". McGarel took an interest in the work of his tenant farmers and encouraged improvements via innovation and training. He also supported the Larne Agricultural School and the work of Dr Thomas Kirkpatrick, agricultural inspector. This scheme was not without critics because only a small number of the students who graduated went on to take up farming. During the period that followed the 1866 financial crisis, McGarel believed that the high number of unemployed workers in Britain should be encouraged to emigrate to the colonies. He joined the National Emigration League and was prepared to seed fund the scheme with £1000 of his own money if others matched his contribution.

McGarel was High Sheriff of County Antrim in 1848, a Justice of the Peace and appointed Deputy Lieutenant in 1855 In 1846 Charles McGarel with others was appointed one of Her Majesty's Commissioners for borrowing, raising, managing, and expending a five hundred thousand pound loan for British Guiana related to immigration purposes.

== Death and family ==
McGarel outlived all of his siblings, and died at 6 Regency Square, Brighton, Sussex, on 10 October 1876, aged 88. Probate indicated that the value of his effects was under £500,000, a very large sum for the time. His wife Mary died in 1913. McGarel's brother-in-law James Hogg, who inherited his estate, was made Baron of Magheramorne in 1877.

In the 1851 census for Co. Antrim, his brother John (1779–1852) is shown as living in Main Street, Larne, with his brother, Peter (c. 1789 – 1859), and his wife Helena (1801–1882). Peter, who had continued to live in Larne, was active in civic matters in the town. McGarel's sister, Catherine, who was the mother of Lady Mary (Allen) Murray, had died in about 1816 and the remaining sister, Mary (1788–1872), died in Larne, unmarried.
