= Ogg (surname) =

Ogg is a surname. Notable people with the name include:

- Alan Ogg (1967–2009), American basketball player
- Andrew Ogg (born 1934), American mathematician
- Beverly Ogg (1937–2019), American actress known professionally as Beverly Owen
- David Ogg (born 1967), Australian rules footballer
- David Ogg (historian) (1887–1965), Scottish historian
- Jacques Ogg (born 1948), Dutch keyboardist on harpsichord and fortepiano
- Kirsty Ogg, Scottish curator
- Steven Ogg, Canadian actor
- Sir William Gammie Ogg (1891–1979), Scottish horticultural scientist
- William L. Ogg (1937–2020), American politician
- Richard N. Ogg, American airline pilot, who in 1956 ditched Pan Am Flight 6 in the Pacific Ocean with all aboard surviving

== See also ==
- Hogg (surname)
- Nanny Ogg, fictional
- Angus Og, (originally Angus Òg) is a comic strip created by Scottish cartoonist Ewen Bain.
