= Shadow Cabinet of Edward Heath =

Edward Heath formed a total of two non-consecutive Shadow Cabinets:

- First Shadow Cabinet of Edward Heath, 1965–1970
- Second Shadow Cabinet of Edward Heath, 1974–1975
