= James McGarel-Hogg, 1st Baron Magheramorne =

British politician

The Right Honourable The Lord Magheramorne KCB
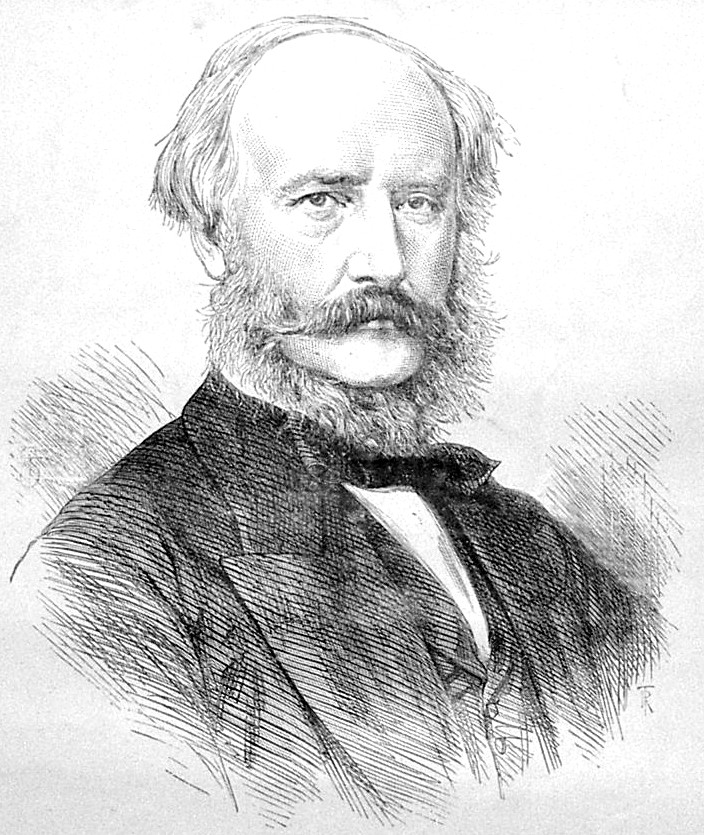

Member of Parliament for Hornsey
- In office 1885–1887
- Preceded by: New constituency
- Succeeded by: Henry Stephens

Member of Parliament for Truro
- In office 1871–1885 Serving with Sir Frederick Williams, Arthur Tremayne, Edward Brydges Willyams
- Preceded by: John Vivian; Sir Frederick Williams
- Succeeded by: William Bickford-Smith

Member of Parliament for Bath
- In office 1865–1868 Serving with Sir William Tite
- Preceded by: Sir William Tite; Arthur Edwin Way
- Succeeded by: Sir William Tite; Donald Dalrymple

Personal details
- Born: James Macnaghten Hogg; 3 May 1823; Kolkata, India
- Died: 27 June 1890 (aged 67)
- Political party: Conservative
- Spouse: Hon. Caroline Elizabeth Emma Douglas-Pennant (m. 1857; died 1890)
- Children: 6, including James, Dudley, Ronald
- Parent(s): Sir James Hogg, 1st Baronet; Mary Swinton
- Education: Eton College
- Alma mater: Christ Church, Oxford

James Macnaghten McGarel-Hogg, 1st Baron Magheramorne, KCB (3 May 1823 – 27 June 1890), was a British politician, Member of Parliament, and local government leader.

== Early life ==
James Macnaghten Hogg was born in Calcutta on 3 May 1823 into an Ulster-Scots family, being the son of Sir James Weir Hogg, 1st Baronet, and the former Mary Swinton. His father was the Administrator-General of Bengal and Chairman of the British East India Company. Among his large immediate family were Isabella Hogg (wife of Dudley Marjoribanks, 1st Baron Tweedmouth), Florence Hogg (wife of George William Campbell), Charles Swinton Hogg (who married Harriet Anne Stirling, daughter of Sir Walter Stirling, 2nd Baronet), Mary Rosina Hogg (wife of Charles McGarel of Magheramorne), Fergusson Floyer Hogg (who married Elizabeth Helen Parsons, a granddaughter of the 2nd Earl of Rosse), Annie Claudina Hogg (who never married), Sir Stuart Saunders Hogg (who married Selina Catherine Perry, daughter of Sir Thomas Erskine Perry), Sir Frederick Russell Hogg (who married Emily Eckford and Harriett Venn Dicken, sister-in-law of the 5th Marquess of Sligo), Amy Hogg (who married James William MacNabb), Stapleton Cotton Hogg (the Assistant Finance Secretary, India Office), Constance Hogg (who married Francis Augustus Bevan), and Quintin Hogg (who married Alice Anna Graham).

His paternal grandparents were William Hogg and Mary (née Dickey) Hogg (a James Dickey of Dunmore, County Antrim). His maternal grandparents were Isabella (née Routledge) Swinton and Samuel Swinton of Swinton House, Swinton, Berwickshire.

He was educated at Eton College and Christ Church, Oxford but left Oxford early without taking his degree to enter the Army and became a Lieutenant-Colonel in the Life Guards, part of the Household Cavalry.

== Career ==
On retiring from the Army he went into politics, being elected unopposed as a Conservative MP for Bath in 1865.

He was also a member of St. George, Hanover Square Vestry, a form of local government similar to a parish council. From 1867 he was chosen by the Vestry to represent them on the Metropolitan Board of Works which co-ordinated cross-London building schemes. He was defeated for re-election in Bath in 1868 and concentrated on his work on the Board, and after the death of Sir John Thwaites who had chaired the Board since it was created, he was elected as the new chairman on 18 November 1870. Hogg was elected MP for Truro in an 1871 byelection and retained that seat until he transferred to Hornsey at the 1885 general election.

His Parliamentary duties made it more difficult for Hogg to be a full-time chairman of the board. While his predecessor had dismissed staff who he felt were not up to the job, Hogg used his influence to try to keep their jobs safe. Unlike Thwaites, he did not look in detail at the work of the staff but let them get on with their work. This meant that departments within the Board became either very efficient, or very inefficient. The Architects department was particularly noted for inefficiency.

Several of the Board's big schemes were just being completed when McGarel-Hogg's Chairmanship began. The Victoria Embankment had been opened shortly before he was elected, and he got to share in the rewards for the Board's successes, being made a Knight Commander of the Order of the Bath in 1874 when the Chelsea Embankment was opened. Under McGarel-Hogg, the Board bought up all of the bridges over the Thames and freed them of tolls. However, the Board's desire for a new bridge by Little Tower Hill could not be fulfilled because its revenue source was not secure. Tower Bridge was eventually built by the City of London Corporation.

The Board also acquired the power to clear slums in 1875, but found the process cumbersome and expensive, resulting in small progress (although it accelerated when further Acts of Parliament removed some restrictions). Several parks were also bought by the Board and opened to the public. However, McGarel-Hogg's administration was hit by scandal in 1887 over the sale of surplus land, blighting somewhat the award of a peerage in the celebrations of Queen Victoria's Golden Jubilee. A Royal Commission found officers and two members of the Board guilty of malpractice. This resulted in the decision to abolish the Board and replace it with a directly elected council.

Magheramorne had fought for the Board to get permission to build a tunnel at Blackwall and it had been granted in 1887. The tenders for the contract came in early in 1889, when the London County Council had been elected but was not yet in control. He was determined to grant the contract through the Board and resisted the LCC's request that it leave the decision to them; however, when the LCC discovered the Board's intention to seal the contracts, they appealed to the Government and the Board was abolished on 21 March 1889.

He died a year after leaving office at the MBW.

== Personal life ==
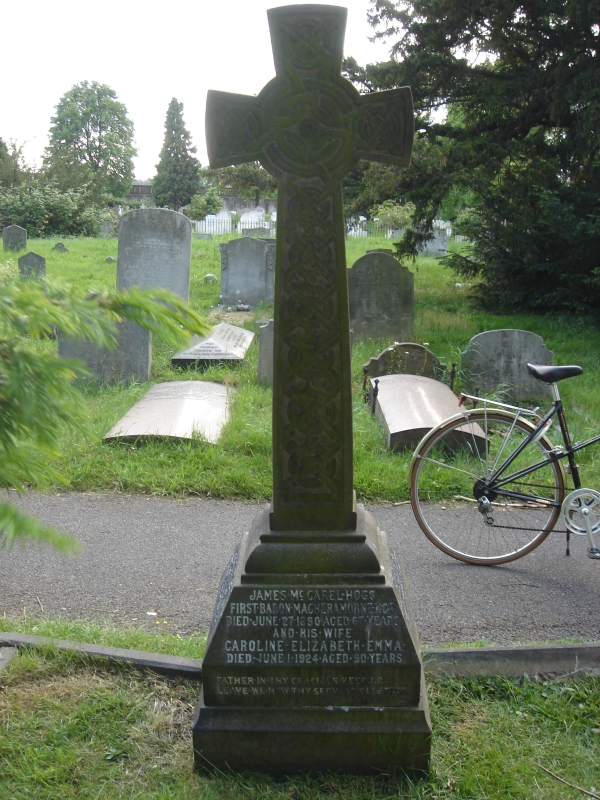
Funerary monument, Brompton Cemetery, London

On 31 August 1857, Hogg was married to Hon. Caroline Elizabeth Emma Douglas-Pennant (c. 1834–1924), the daughter of Edward Gordon Douglas-Pennant, 1st Baron Penrhyn and Juliana Isabella Mary Dawkins-Pennant (a daughter of George Hay Dawkins-Pennant). Together, they were the parents of:

- Hon. Edith Mary McGarel-Hogg (1859–1939), who married Hon. Arthur Saumarez, son of Col. John Saumarez, 3rd Baron de Saumarez and Margaret Antoinette Northey, in 1881.
- James Douglas McGarel-Hogg, 2nd Baron Magheramorne (1861–1903), who married Lady Evelyn Harriet Ashley-Cooper, daughter of Anthony Ashley-Cooper, 8th Earl of Shaftesbury and Lady Harriet Chichester (a daughter of the 3rd Marquess of Donegall), in 1889.
- Dudley Stuart McGarel-Hogg, 3rd Baron Magheramorne (1863–1946), who died unmarried.
- Ronald Tracey McGarel-Hogg, 4th Baron Magheramorne (1863–1957), who died unmarried.
- Hon. Archibald Campbell McGarel-Hogg (1866–1945), an architect who died unmarried.
- Hon. Gerald Francis McGarel-Hogg (1868–1942), a Lieutenant in the 4th Battalion, Royal Welch Fusiliers who died unmarried.

On 8 February 1877, he added the surname McGarel on inheriting the estates of his late brother-in-law Charles McGarel, the husband of his sister, Mary Rosina Hogg.

He died in 1890, and is buried in Brompton Cemetery, London. He was succeeded in his barony by his son James.

Parliament of the United Kingdom
Preceded by Sir William Tite and Arthur Edwin Way	Member of Parliament for Bath; 1865–1868; With: Sir William Tite	Succeeded by Sir William Tite and Donald Dalrymple
Preceded by John Vivian and Sir Frederick Williams	Member of Parliament for Truro; 1871–1885; With: Sir Frederick Williams to 1878; Arthur Tremayne 1878–1880; Edward Brydges Willyams 1880–1885	Succeeded by William Bickford-Smith
New constituency	Member of Parliament for Hornsey; 1885–1887	Succeeded by Henry Stephens
Political offices
Preceded by Sir John Thwaites	Chairman of the Metropolitan Board of Works; 1870–1889	Post abolished
Peerage of the United Kingdom
New creation	Baron Magheramorne; 1887–1890	Succeeded by James McGarel-Hogg
Baronetage of the United Kingdom
Preceded by James Hogg	Baronet of Upper Grosvenor Street; 1876–1890	Succeeded by James McGarel-Hogg
