= Arthur Robert Hogg =

Australian astronomer

- Arthur Hogg on observing platform at Mount Stromlo Observatory, undated
- Born: 25 November 1903; Melbourne
- Died: 31 March 1966 (aged 62); Canberra
- Occupations: Physicist and astronomer

Arthur Robert Hogg (25 November 1903 – 31 March 1966) was an Australian physicist and astronomer.

== Biography ==
He was born in Melbourne, Victoria, was educated at the Royal Melbourne Institute of Technology and at the University of Melbourne where he earned his B.Sc. in 1923 and M.Sc. in 1925. In 1927 he began working at the Broken Hill Associated Smelters in Port Pirie, South Australia, becoming the assistant supervisor of research, and he remained there until 1929. He then joined the Mount Stromlo Observatory, then called the Commonwealth Solar Observatory, initially as an assistant. At Mount Stromlo, he took up the study of electrical phenomena in the atmosphere, including ionization in the lower atmosphere. He then transitioned into the study of cosmic rays and, by 1935, had set up a high-pressure ionisation chamber from which hourly readings were made.

Beginning in 1940, near the start of World War II, he worked as a physicist in the Chemical Defence Section at the Munitions Supply Laboratories in Maribyrnong. There his work was focused on the study of respirators. In 1944 he became secretary of the Physical and Meteorological Sub-Committee at the Lab.

After the war he returned to work at Mount Stromlo, which had changed significantly since his earlier time there with research having shifted to stellar astronomy. He now began astronomical studies using photoelectric photometry and produced a series of papers on eclipsing variables, globular clusters in the galaxy, and the magellanic clouds.

In 1950, was awarded his Phd from the University of Melbourne, based on his earlier study of cosmic rays.

He also became involved in the administration of the observatory and played a leading role in establishing the new 74-inch (1,900 mm) telescope. Later he selected Siding Spring Mountain as the site of a 150-inch (3,800 mm) telescope, located further from the encroaching growth near the older observatory.

He became deputy director of the Mount Stromlo from 1961 to 1966. Hogg also served in other positions of note, including as president of the Royal Society of Canberra in 1954; chairman of the Australian Institute of Physics, Australian Capital Territory branch, 1964; and the Commission 6 on Astronomical Telegrams of the International Astronomical Union from 1961 until 1964.

He died on 31 March 1966 in Canberra.

== Personal life ==
In 1933 he married to Irene Doris Tyson (known as Yandell). The couple had two sons, Robert Ernest Tremayne born in 1936 and Garth Richard born in 1940 and a daughter, Elizabeth Irene born in 1946.

== Awards and honours ==
- Fellow of the Australian Institute of Physics.
- Fellow of the Australian Academy of Science, 1954.
- The crater Hogg on the Moon is co-named for Arthur Hogg and Frank S. Hogg.

== Collections ==
A collection of Hogg's records, primarily consisting of manuscripts, typescripts of papers and lectures and work notes, is held by the Adolph Basser Library at the Australian Academy of Science in Canberra.
