= Stuart Saunders Hogg =

British civil servant in the Indian Civil Services of British India

Sir Stuart Saunders Hogg

Sir Stuart Saunders Hogg CIE (17 February 1833 – 23 March 1921) was a British civil servant in the Indian Civil Services of British India.

== Early life ==
He was born in 1833 in Delhi to Sir James Hogg, formerly a director of the British East India Company and the Registrar of the Calcutta High Court.

== Career ==
In 1853, aged 20, Hogg came to India and entered the Indian Civil Services. He became the District Magistrate of Burdwan. During the Sepoy Mutiny, he was posted in the Punjab. Later, he joined the Bengal government as the Police Commissioner of Calcutta where he established the Detective Department. From 1863 to 1877 he was the Chairman of the Calcutta Municipal Corporation. In 1875, he was knighted.

== Legacy ==
The New Market, an upscale market that he founded, was named Sir Stuart Hogg Market in 1903 in his honour. It is still (often) referred to as Hogg Market.

Police appointments
Preceded by V. H. Shalch	Police Commissioner of Calcutta; 1866–1876	Succeeded by C. T. Metcalfe
