= Quintin Hogg, Baron Hailsham of Saint Marylebone =

British judge and politician (1907–2001)

The Right Honourable The Lord Hailsham of Saint Marylebone KG CH PC FRS
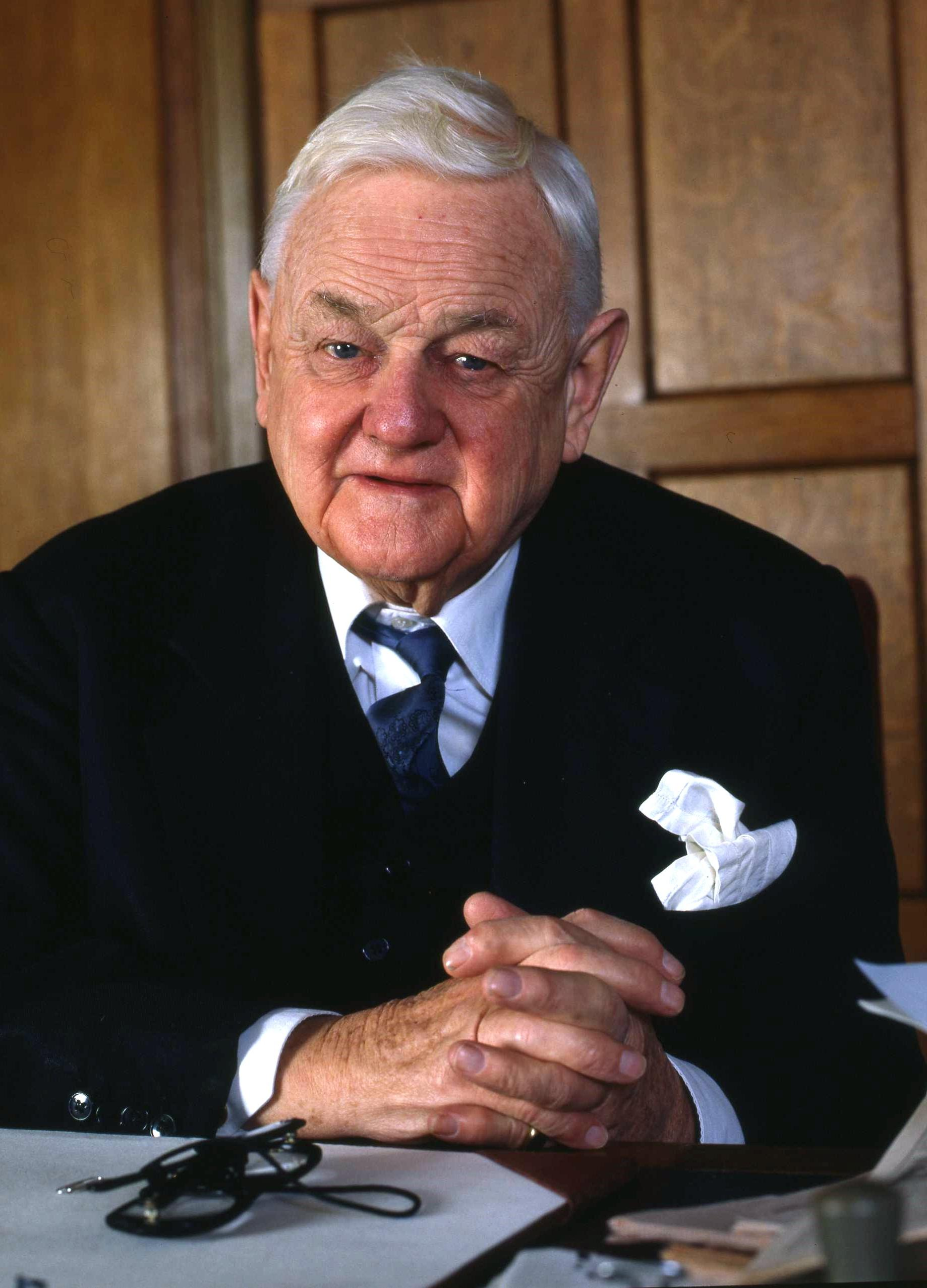
- Hailsham in 1990

Lord Chancellor
- In office 20 June 1970 – 4 March 1974
- Monarch: Elizabeth II
- Prime Minister: Edward Heath
- Preceded by: The Lord Gardiner
- Succeeded by: The Lord Elwyn-Jones
- In office 4 May 1979 – 13 June 1987
- Monarch: Elizabeth II
- Prime Minister: Margaret Thatcher
- Preceded by: The Lord Elwyn-Jones
- Succeeded by: The Lord Havers

Shadow Home Secretary
- In office 13 April 1966 – 20 June 1970
- Leader: Edward Heath
- Preceded by: Peter Thorneycroft
- Succeeded by: James Callaghan

Secretary of State for Education and Science
- In office 1 April 1964 – 16 October 1964
- Prime Minister: Alec Douglas-Home
- Preceded by: Himself (as Minister for Science); Sir Edward Boyle (as Minister of Education)
- Succeeded by: Michael Stewart
- In office 3 November 1959 – 31 March 1964; Minister for Science
- Prime Minister: Harold Macmillan; Alec Douglas-Home
- Preceded by: Alec Douglas-Home (as Lord President of the Council)
- Succeeded by: Himself (as Secretary of State for Education and Science)
- In office 14 January 1957 – 17 September 1957; Minister of Education
- Prime Minister: Harold Macmillan
- Preceded by: Sir David Eccles
- Succeeded by: Geoffrey Lloyd

Lord President of the Council
- In office 27 July 1960 – 16 October 1964
- Prime Minister: Harold Macmillan; Alec Douglas-Home
- Preceded by: Alec Douglas-Home
- Succeeded by: Herbert Bowden
- In office 17 September 1957 – 14 October 1959
- Prime Minister: Harold Macmillan
- Preceded by: Alec Douglas-Home
- Succeeded by: Alec Douglas-Home

Leader of the House of Lords
- In office 27 July 1960 – 20 October 1963
- Prime Minister: Harold Macmillan
- Preceded by: Alec Douglas-Home
- Succeeded by: The Lord Carrington

Chairman of the Conservative Party
- In office 18 September 1957 – 14 October 1959
- Leader: Harold Macmillan
- Preceded by: The Lord Poole
- Succeeded by: Rab Butler

Lord Keeper of the Privy Seal
- In office 14 October 1959 – 27 July 1960
- Prime Minister: Harold Macmillan
- Preceded by: Rab Butler
- Succeeded by: Edward Heath

First Lord of the Admiralty
- In office 19 October 1956 – 14 January 1957
- Prime Minister: Anthony Eden
- Preceded by: The Viscount Cilcennin
- Succeeded by: The Earl of Selkirk

Parliamentary Under-Secretary of State for Air
- In office 12 April 1945 – 4 August 1945 Serving with The Lord Sherwood and The Earl Beatty
- Prime Minister: Winston Churchill
- Preceded by: The Lord Sherwood
- Succeeded by: John Strachey
Parliamentary offices
Member of Parliament for St Marylebone
In office 5 December 1963 – 30 June 1970
Preceded by	Wavell Wakefield
Succeeded by	Kenneth Baker
Member of Parliament for Oxford
In office 27 October 1938 – 16 August 1950
Preceded by	Robert Bourne
Succeeded by	Lawrence Turner
Member of the House of Lords
Lord Temporal
Hereditary peerage 16 August 1950 – 20 November 1963 (disclaimed)
Preceded by	The 1st Viscount Hailsham
Succeeded by	Seat abolished
Life peerage 30 June 1970 – 12 October 2001

Personal details
- Born: Quintin McGarel Hogg; 9 October 1907 London, England
- Died: 12 October 2001 (aged 94) London, England
- Resting place: All Saints, Herstmonceux, Sussex
- Party: Conservative
- Spouses: Natalie Sullivan (m. 1932; div. 1943) Mary Martin (m. 1944; died 1978) Deirdre Shannon (m. 1986; died 1998)
- Children: 5, including Douglas Hogg & Dame Mary Claire Hogg
- Parent: The 1st Viscount Hailsham (father)
- Education: Sunningdale School; Eton College
- Alma mater: Christ Church, Oxford

Quintin McGarel Hogg, Baron Hailsham of Saint Marylebone (9 October 1907 – 12 October 2001), was a British barrister and Conservative Party politician. He was known as the 2nd Viscount Hailsham between 1950 and 1963, at which point he disclaimed his hereditary peerage.

Like his father, Hailsham was considered to be a contender for the leadership of the Conservative Party. He was a contender to succeed Harold Macmillan as prime minister in 1963, renouncing his hereditary peerage to do so, but was passed over in favour of Alec Douglas-Home. He was created a life peer in 1970 and served as Lord Chancellor, the office formerly held by his father, in 1970–74 and 1979–87.

== Background ==
Born in Bayswater, London, Hogg was the son of the 1st Viscount Hailsham, who was Lord Chancellor under Stanley Baldwin, and grandson of Quintin Hogg, a merchant, philanthropist and educational reformer, and an American mother; Hogg's great-grandfather was Sir James Hogg, 1st Baronet, a businessman and politician from Ulster. The middle name McGarel comes from Charles McGarel, an Ulsterman who had large holdings of slaves, and who financially sponsored Quintin Hogg's grandfather, also called Quintin Hogg, who was McGarel's brother-in-law.

Hogg was educated at Sunningdale School and then Eton College, where he was a King's Scholar and won the Newcastle Scholarship in 1925. He entered Christ Church, Oxford as a Scholar and he was President of the Oxford University Conservative Association and of the Oxford Union. He took Firsts in Honours Moderations in 1928 and in Literae Humaniores in 1930. He was elected to a Prize Fellowship in Law at All Souls College, Oxford, in 1931. He was called to the bar by Lincoln's Inn in 1932.

Hogg spoke in opposition to the motion "That this House will in no circumstances fight for its King and Country" in the 1933 King and Country debate at the Oxford Union.

== Public life ==
Hogg participated in his first election campaign in the 1924 general election, and in all subsequent general election campaigns until his death.

=== Election in the wake of the Munich Agreement ===
In 1938, Hogg was chosen as a candidate for Parliament in the Oxford by-election. This election took place shortly after the Munich Agreement, and the Labour candidate Patrick Gordon Walker was persuaded to step down to allow a unified challenge to the Conservatives; A. D. Lindsay, the Master of Balliol College, fought as an "Independent Progressive" candidate. Hogg narrowly defeated Lindsay, who was said to be horrified by the popular slogan of "Hitler wants Hogg".

=== Second World War ===
Hogg voted against Neville Chamberlain in the Norway Debate of May 1940, and supported Winston Churchill. He served briefly in the desert campaign as a platoon commander with the Rifle Brigade during the Second World War. His commanding officer had been his contemporary at Eton; after him and the second-in-command, Hogg was the third-oldest officer in the battalion. After a knee wound in August 1941, which almost cost him his right leg, Hogg was deemed too old for further front-line service, and later served on the staff of General "Jumbo" Wilson before leaving the army with the rank of major. In the run-up to the 1945 election, Hogg wrote a response to the book Guilty Men, called The Left Was Never Right.

=== As a hereditary peer ===
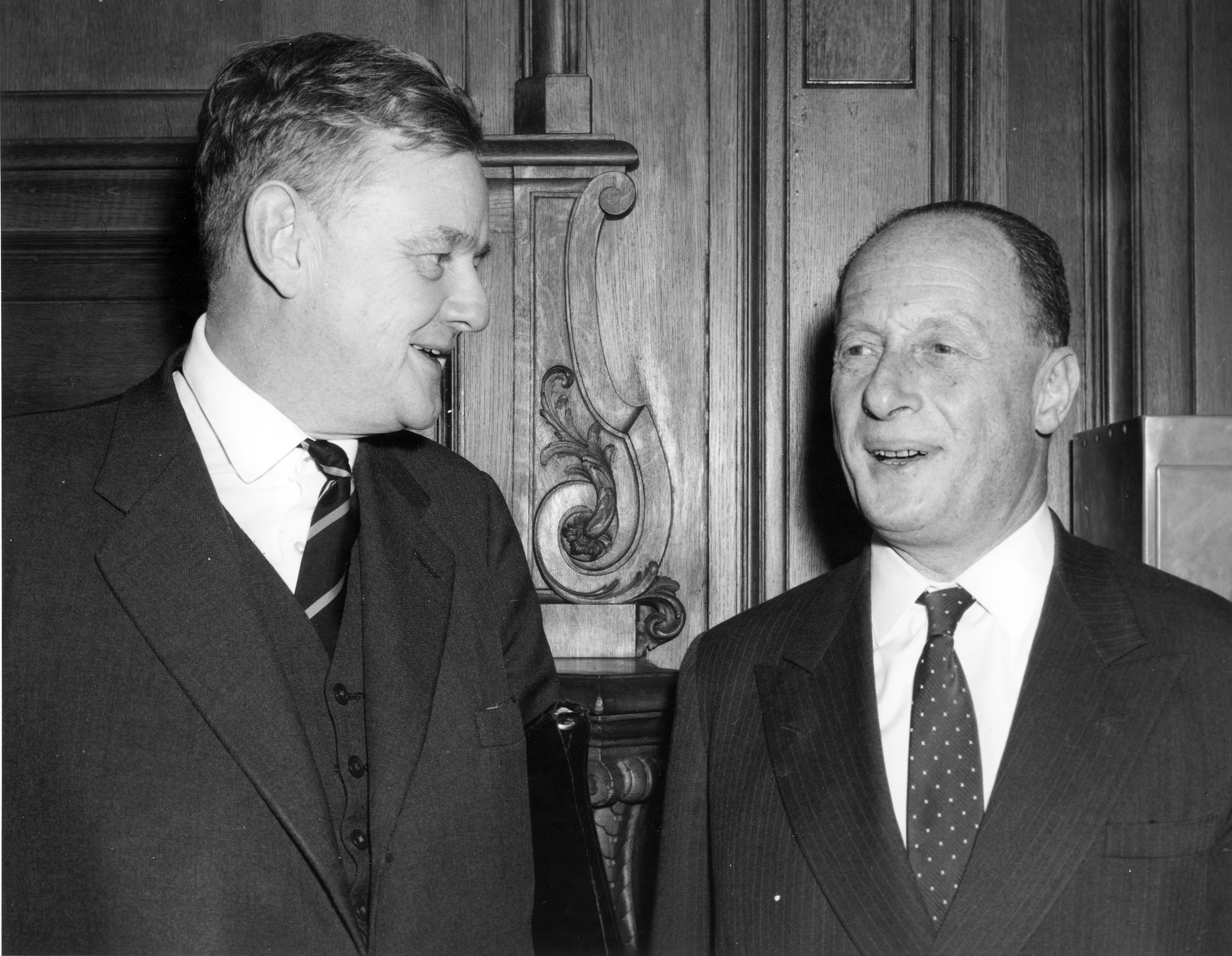
Lord Hailsham and Étienne Hirsch in 1959

Hogg's father died in 1950, and Hogg entered the House of Lords, succeeding his father as the second Viscount Hailsham. Believing his political career to be over, he concentrated on his career at the bar for some years. He took silk in 1953 and becoming head of his barristers' chambers in 1955, succeeding Kenneth Diplock. When the Conservatives returned to power under Churchill in 1951, he refused to be considered for office. In 1956, he refused appointment as Postmaster-General under Anthony Eden on financial grounds, only to accept appointment as First Lord of the Admiralty six weeks later. His appointment, however, had to be delayed because of the Crabb affair.

As First Lord, Hailsham was briefed about Eden's plans to use military force against Egypt, which he thought were "madness". Nevertheless, once Operation Musketeer had been launched, he thought that Britain could not retreat until the Suez Canal had been captured. In the middle of the operation, Lord Mountbatten threatened to resign as First Sea Lord in protest, but Hailsham ordered him in writing to stay on duty: he believed that Mountbatten was entitled to be protected by his minister, and that he was bound to resign if the honour of the Navy was impaired by the conduct of the operation. Hailsham remained critical of the actions of the then Chancellor of the Exchequer, Harold Macmillan, during the crisis, believing that he had suffered from a failure of nerve.

Hailsham became Minister of Education in 1957 under Macmillan. He held this office for eight months, before accepting appointment as Lord President of the Council and Chairman of the Conservative Party in September 1957. During his term as Party Chairman, the Conservative Party won a notable victory in the 1959 general election, which it had been predicted to lose, and formed the second Macmillan government. After the election, Hailsham was sidelined, and was made Minister for Science and Technology; he served in that post until 1964. His tenure as Science Minister was successful, and he was later elected to the Royal Society under Statute 12 in 1973.

Concurrently, Hailsham was Lord Privy Seal between 1959 and 1960, Lord President of the Council between 1960 and 1964, and Leader of the House of Lords between 1960 and 1963, having been Deputy Leader between 1957 and 1960. Macmillan also gave him a number of special assignments: he was Minister with special responsibility for Sport from 1962 to 1964, for unemployment in the North-East between 1963 and 1964, and for higher education between 1963 and 1964. Hailsham, who had little interest in sports, thought little of his appointment as de facto Sports Minister, later writing that "[t]he idea of a Minister for Sport has always appalled me. It savours of dictatorship and the nastiest kind of populist or Fascist dictatorship at that."

Hailsham appeared before the Wolfenden Committee to discuss homosexuality. The historian Patrick Higgins said that he used it as "an opportunity to express his disgust". He stated, "The instinct of mankind to describe homosexual acts as 'unnatural' is not based on mere prejudice" and that homosexuals were corrupting and "a proselytising religion".

In June 1963, when his fellow Minister John Profumo had to resign after admitting lying to Parliament about his private life, Hailsham attacked him savagely on television. The Labour MP Reginald Paget called this "a virtuoso performance of the art of kicking a friend in the guts". He added, "When self-indulgence has reduced a man to the shape of Lord Hailsham, sexual continence involves no more than a sense of the ridiculous."

In 15 July, he and Averell Harriman arrived in Moscow for nuclear test-ban negotiations.

=== Conservative Party leadership bid (1963) ===
Hailsham was Leader of the House of Lords when Harold Macmillan announced his sudden resignation from the premiership for health reasons at the start of the 1963 Conservative Party conference. At that time there was no formal ballot for the Conservative Party leadership. Hailsham, who was at first Macmillan's preferred successor, announced that he would use the newly-enacted Peerage Act 1963 to disclaim his title and fight a by-election and return to the House of Commons. His publicity-seeking antics at the Party Conference—such as feeding his baby daughter in public, and allowing his supporters to distribute "Q" (for Quintin) badges—were considered vulgar at the time, so Macmillan did not encourage senior party members to choose him as his successor.

Eventually, on the advice of Macmillan, The Queen chose Alec Douglas-Home to succeed Macmillan as prime minister. Hailsham nevertheless renounced his peerage on 20 November 1963, becoming again Quintin Hogg. He stood and was elected as MP for St Marylebone, his father's old constituency, in the 1963 St Marylebone by-election.

Hogg as a campaigner was known for his robust rhetoric and theatrical gestures. He was usually in good form in dealing with hecklers, a valuable skill in the 1960s, and was prominent in the 1964 general election. One evening when giving a political address, he was hailed by his supporters as he leaned over the lectern pointing at a long-haired heckler. He said, "Now, see here, Sir or Madam whichever the case might be, we have had enough of you!" The police ejected the man and the crowd applauded and Hogg went on as if nothing had happened. Another time, when a Labour Party supporter waved a Harold Wilson placard in front of him, Hogg smacked it with his walking-stick.

=== Lord Chancellorship as Baron Hailsham (1970–1974, 1979–1987) ===
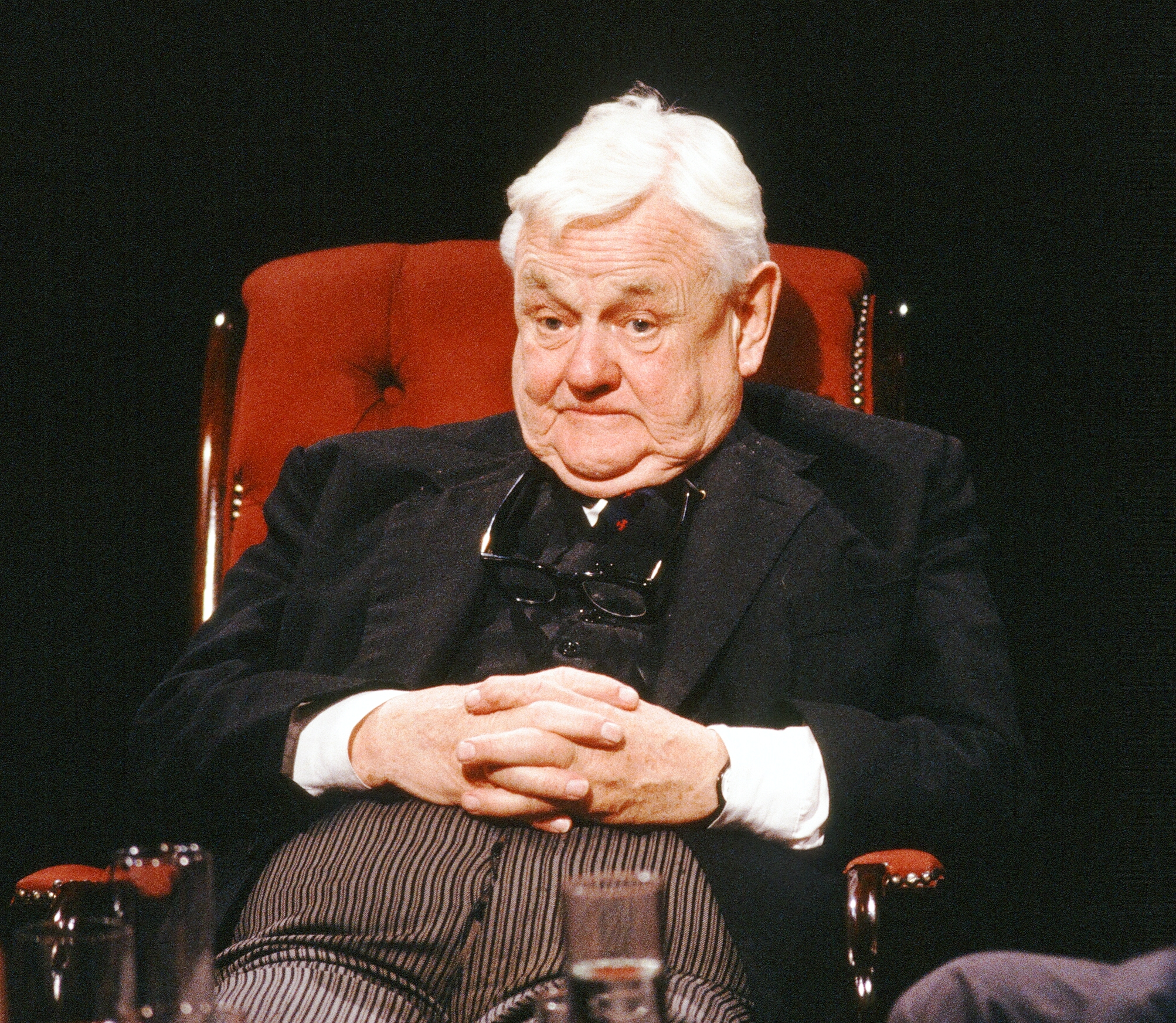
Appearing on television discussion programme After Dark in 1988.

Hogg served in the Conservative shadow cabinet during the Wilson government, and built up his practice at the bar, where one of his clients was Harold Wilson, the Prime Minister and his political opponent. When Edward Heath won the 1970 general election he received a life peerage as Baron Hailsham of St Marylebone, of Herstmonceux in the County of Sussex, and became Lord Chancellor. Hogg was the first to return to the House of Lords as a life peer after having disclaimed an hereditary peerage. Hailsham's choice of Lord Widgery as Lord Chief Justice was criticised by his opponents, although he later redeemed himself in the eyes of the profession by appointing Lord Lane to succeed Widgery. His appointment as Lord Chancellor caused some amusement; in October 1962 he had told a journalist (Logan Gourlay of the Daily Express) that when he had inherited his title he had thought that by 1970 if the Tory Government were in power "some ass might make me Lord Chancellor".

During his first term as Lord Chancellor, Hailsham oversaw the passage of the Courts Act 1971, which fundamentally reformed English justice by abolishing the ancient assizes and quarter sessions, which were replaced by permanent Crown Courts. The Act also established a unified court service, under the responsibility of the Lord Chancellor's Department, which as a result expanded substantially. He also piloted through the House of Lords Heath's controversial Industrial Relations Act 1971, which established the short-lived National Industrial Relations Court.

Hailsham announced his retirement after the end of the Heath government in 1974. He popularised the term "elective dictatorship" in 1976, later writing a detailed exposition, The Dilemma of Democracy. However, after the tragic death of his second wife in a riding accident, he decided to return to active politics, as a Shadow Minister without Portfolio first in the Shadow Cabinet of Edward Heath and then in the Shadow Cabinet of Margaret Thatcher.

Hailsham served again as Lord Chancellor from 1979 to 1987 under Margaret Thatcher. He vigorously opposed the Thatcher government's plans to reform the legal profession. He opposed the introduction of contingency fees, observing that the professions were "not like the grocer's shop at the corner of a street in a town like Grantham", (a reference to Margaret Thatcher's origins). He argued that the Courts and Legal Services Act 1990 disregarded "almost every principle of the methodology which law reform ought to attract" and was no less than an attempt to "nationalise the profession and part of the judiciary" (Hansard 5L, 514.151, 19 December 1989).

Hailsham was widely considered as a traditionalist Lord Chancellor. He put great emphasis on the traditional roles of his post, sitting on the Appellate Committee of the House of Lords more frequently than any of his post-war predecessors. Appointment of deputies to preside over the Lords enabled him to give more time to judicial work, although he often sat on the Woolsack himself. He was protective of the English bar, opposing the appointment of solicitors to the High Court and the extension of their rights of audience. He was, however, responsible for implementing the far-reaching 1971 reform of the courts system, and championed law reform and the work of the Law Commission.

=== Retirement and honours ===
Towards the end of his life Hailsham suffered from depression, which he managed somewhat by his lifelong love of classical literature.

Hailsham remained an active if semi-detached member of the governing body of All Souls College, Oxford almost until his death.

In addition to his peerages, he was appointed a Member of the Order of the Companions of Honour in 1974 and a Knight Companion of the Garter in 1988.

== Personal life ==
Hailsham married three times:

- First, in 1932, he married Natalie Sullivan. The marriage was dissolved in 1943 after he returned from the war to find her, as he later put it in a television interview, "not alone": she was with French president Charles de Gaulle's chef de cabinet, François Coulet.
- On 18 April 1944, he married Mary Evelyn Martin (19 May 1919 – 10 March 1978), a descendant of the Martyn family of The Tribes of Galway. They had five children including Douglas Martin Hogg, 3rd Viscount Hailsham, and Mary Claire Hogg.

Hailsham inherited Carter's Corner Place, a 17th-century house with wide views over the Pevensey marshes and the English Channel, from his father in 1950, and farmed there for more than a decade. In 1963 he sold the property because of the cost and because his wife found the upkeep too much of a strain, but he then continued to visit it.

His wife Mary was killed in front of her husband in a horse-riding accident during a visit to Sydney, Australia, in 1978. Hailsham was distraught and blamed himself for not having reminded her to wear a hard hat. Her gravestone at All Saints, Herstmonceux, Sussex, describes her as his "radiant and joyous companion".

- On 1 March 1986, Hailsham married Deirdre Margaret Shannon Aft (1928/9–1998), a former secretary in his chambers. She cared for him in his old age, but predeceased him in 1998.

=== Personality and disability ===
Hailsham retained some of the manner of a clever schoolboy throughout his life. He was in the habit of reciting long passages of Ancient Greek verse at inappropriate moments in conversations. He would sometimes come to work on Mondays with Greek epigams he had written over the weekend, to show his staff. His handwriting was calligraphic

As a young man Hailsham was a keen mountain-climber, and broke both his ankles while climbing the Valais Alps. The fractures (which he wrongly believed to be sprains) healed for the time being. Hailsham remained physically energetic until late middle age, and in the 1960s he could often be seen cycling unsteadily around London, dressed in the bowler hat and pin-striped suit of a barrister. He was also a scuba diver, and trained with the London Branch of the British Sub-Aqua Club. However, both of his damaged ankles, as he later wrote, "packed up within a week of one another in June 1974". Thereafter he was only able to walk short distances, with the aid of two walking-sticks. In old age he also suffered from arthritis.

=== Death and succession ===
Lord Hailsham of St Marylebone died from heart failure and pneumonia at his home in Putney Heath, London, on 12 October 2001, aged 94. The viscountcy that he had disclaimed in 1963 was inherited by his elder son Douglas, who was then an MP. As a result of the House of Lords Act 1999, which had removed the right of most hereditary peers to sit in the House of Lords, it was not necessary for him to disclaim his viscountcy to remain a member of the House of Commons.

Like his father and other members of the family, he was buried in the churchyard at All Saints, Herstmonceux, Sussex.

Hailsham's wealth at death was valued for probate at £4,618,511 (around £9.9 million at 2026 prices).

== Writings ==
Hogg's 1945 book The Left Was Never Right was a fierce response to two books in Victor Gollancz's "Victory Books" series, Guilty Men by Frank Owen, Michael Foot, and Peter Howard, and Your M.P. by Tom Wintringham, both published during the war and largely attempting to discredit Tory MPs as appeasers and war profiteers. The Wintringham volume had been republished in the lead up to the 1945 general election, widely acknowledged at the time as a major factor in shifting public opinion away from the Conservative party. Hogg's book sought to contrast Wintringham's statistics on appeasement with patriotic statistics of his own, maintaining that Labour MPs had been lacking in their wartime duties.

Perhaps his most important book, the Penguin paperback The Case for Conservatism, was a similar response to Labour Marches On by John Parker MP. Published in 1947 in the aftermath of the crushing Conservative election defeat of 1945, and aimed at the mass market and the layman, it presented a well-written and coherent case for Conservatism. According to the book, the role of Conservatism is not to oppose all change but to resist and balance the volatility of current political fads and ideology, and to defend a middle position that enshrines a slowly changing organic humane traditionalism. For example, in the 19th century Conservatives often opposed the policies of prevailing British liberalism, favouring factory regulation, market intervention and controls to mitigate the effects of laissez faire capitalism, but in the 20th century the role of Conservatism was to oppose an ostensible danger from the opposite direction, the regulation, intervention, and controls favoured by social democracy.

Hailsham was also known for his writings on faith and belief. In 1975 he published his spiritual autobiography The Door Wherein I Went, which included a brief chapter of Christian apologetics, using legal arguments concerning the evidence for the life of Jesus. The book included a particularly moving passage about suicide; when he was a young man his half-brother Edward Marjoribanks had taken his own life, and the experience left Hailsham with a deep conviction that suicide is always wrong.

His writings on Christianity have been the subject of discussion in the writings of Ross Clifford. Hailsham revisited themes of faith in his memoirs A Sparrow's Flight (1991), and the book's title alluded to remarks about sparrows and faith recorded in Bede's Ecclesiastical History and the words of Christ in the Gospel of Matthew.

=== Select bibliography ===
- One Year's Work. London: Hutchinson, The National Book Association. 1944 (As Quintin Hogg.)
- The Times We Live In. London: Signpost Press, 1944. (As Quintin Hogg.)
- The Left Was Never Right. London: Faber and Faber, 1945. (As Quintin Hogg.)
- The Purpose of Parliament. London: Blanford Press, 1946. (As Quintin Hogg.)
- The Case for Conservatism. Harmondsworth, Middlesex: Penguin Books, 1947. (As Quintin Hogg.) Revised, updated, and republished as The Conservative Case, 1959. (As Viscount Hailsham.)
- The Iron Curtain, Fifteen Years After. With a Reprint of [Winston Churchill's] 'The Sinews of Peace' (1946). The John Findley Green Foundation Lectures. Fulton, Missouri: Westminster College, 1961. New York: River Club, 1964. (As Viscount Hailsham.)
- Science and Government. The Fawley Foundation Lectures, 8. Southampton: University of Southampton, 1961. OCLC Number: 962124; OCoLC 594963091. (As Quintin Hogg, Baron Hailsham of St Marylebone.)
- Science and Politics. London: Faber and Faber, 1963. Westport, Conn.: Greenwood Press, 1974. ISBN 9780837172279. (As Quintin Hogg, Baron Hailsham of St Marylebone.)
- The Devil's Own Song and Other Verses. London: Hodder & Stoughton, 1968. ISBN 9780340109793. (As Quintin Hogg.)
- New Charter: Some Proposals for Constitutional Reform. London: Conservative Political Centre, 1969. CPC Series No. 430.
- The Acceptable Face of Western Civilisation. London: Conservative Political Centre, 1973. CPC Series No. 535. ISBN 9780850705317.
- The Door Wherein I Went. London: Collins, 1975. ISBN 9780002161527. (As Lord Hailsham.)
- Elective Dictatorship. The Richard Dimbleby Lectures. London: British Broadcasting Corporation, 1976. ISBN 9780563172543. (As Lord Hailsham.)
- The Dilemma of Democracy: Diagnosis and Prescription. London: Collins, 1979. ISBN 9780002118606. (As Lord Hailsham.)
- A Sparrow's Flight: The Memoirs of Lord Hailsham of St Marylebone. London: William Collins & Sons Ltd, 1991. ISBN 9780002155458. (As Lord Hailsham.)
- On the Constitution. London: HarperCollins, 1992. ISBN 9780002159982. (As Lord Hailsham.)
- Values: Collapse and Cure. London: HarperCollins, 1994. ISBN 9780002553902. (As Lord Hailsham.)

== Assessment and legacy ==
S. M. Cretney argues that "Hailsham was on any assessment one of the outstanding personalities of 20th-century British politics. None of his contemporaries combined so brilliant and well-trained an intellect with a capacity for oratory that enjoyed such wide appeal. His most notable success may well have been his role in reviving the Conservative Party's fortunes in the 1950s … even so, Hailsham's actual achievements in politics arguably failed to reflect his remarkable intellectual power and oratorical skills" and that given his "emotional and temperamental volatility and even instability ... it is difficult to make any rational estimate of quite what a Hailsham administration would have achieved" had he become Prime Minister in 1963.

In Jimmy McGovern's 2002 film Sunday, which portrayed the events of Bloody Sunday and the subsequent Widgery Tribunal, Hailsham was played by the actor Oliver Ford Davies.

=== Further reading ===
Rees, J. (John) Tudor, and Harley V. Usill, editors. They Stand Apart: A Critical Survey of the Problems of Homosexuality. London: William Heinemann, Ltd., 1955. A collection of essays by multiple authors.

Lewis, Geoffrey. Lord Hailsham: A Life. London: Jonathan Cape Ltd., 1997.

Utley, T. E. (Thomas Edwin). Not Guilty: The Conservative Reply. A Vindication of Government Policy. "Foreword by the Rt. Hon. Viscount Hailsham, Q.C." London: MacGibbon & Kee, 1957. OCLC Number: 1412752. A defence of the policies of then-Prime Minister Anthony Eden.

Clifford, Ross. Leading Lawyers' Case for the Resurrection. Edmonton, Alberta: Canadian Institute for Law, Theology, and Public Policy, 1996. ISBN 9781896363028. (Also published as The Case for the Empty Tomb: Leading Lawyers Look at the Resurrection. Sydney: Albatross Books, 1993. ISBN 9780867601275.)

== Coat of Arms ==
Coat of arms of Quintin Hogg, Baron Hailsham of St Marylebone, KG, CH, PC, FRS
Notes The arms of Quintin Hogg, Baron Hailsham of St Marylebone, consist of: Coronet Coronet of a Baron Crest Out of an eastern crown Argent an oak tree fructed proper pendant therefrom an escutcheon Azure charged with a dexter arm embowed in armour the hand grasping an arrow in bend sinister point downwards also proper. Torse Mantling: Azure lined Argent. Escutcheon Argent three boar's heads erased Azure langued Gules between two flaunches also Azure each charged with a crescent of the field. Supporters On either side a ram Argent armed and unguled Or gorged with a baron's coronet the dexter supporting the Lord High Chancellor's mace the sinister the Lord High Chancellor's purse with the initials of Her Majesty Queen Elizabeth II proper. Motto DAT GLORIA VIRES Orders Order of the Garter

Parliament of the United Kingdom
Preceded by Robert Bourne	Member of Parliament for Oxford; 1938–1950	Succeeded by Lawrence Turner
Preceded by Wavell Wakefield	Member of Parliament for St Marylebone; 1963–1970	Succeeded by Kenneth Baker
Political offices
Preceded by The Lord Sherwood	Under Secretary of State for Air; 1945	Succeeded by John Strachey
Preceded by The Viscount Cilcennin	First Lord of the Admiralty; 1956–1957	Succeeded by The Earl of Selkirk
Preceded by David Eccles	Minister for Education; 1957	Succeeded by Geoffrey Lloyd
Preceded by Alec Douglas-Home	Lord President of the Council; 1957–1959	Succeeded by Alec Douglas-Home
Preceded by Rab Butler	Lord Privy Seal; 1959–1960	Succeeded by Edward Heath
Preceded by Alec Douglas-Home as Lord President of the Council	Minister for Science; 1959–1964	Succeeded by Himself as Secretary of State for Education and Science
Preceded by Alec Douglas-Home	Leader of the House of Lords; 1960–1963	Succeeded by The Lord Carrington
Preceded by Alec Douglas-Home	Lord President of the Council; 1960–1964	Succeeded by Herbert Bowden
Preceded by Himself as Minister for Science	Secretary of State for Education and Science; 1964	Succeeded by Michael Stewart
Preceded by Edward Boyle as Minister of Education	Secretary of State for Education and Science; 1964	Succeeded by Michael Stewart
Preceded by Peter Thorneycroft	Shadow Home Secretary; 1966–1970	Succeeded by Jim Callaghan
Preceded by The Lord Gardiner	Lord High Chancellor of Great Britain; 1970–1974	Succeeded by The Lord Elwyn-Jones
Preceded by The Lord Elwyn-Jones	Lord High Chancellor of Great Britain; 1979–1987	Succeeded by The Lord Havers
Party political offices
Preceded by The Lord Poole	Chairman of the Conservative Party; 1957–1959	Succeeded by Rab Butler
Preceded by Alec Douglas-Home	Leader of the Conservative Party in the House of Lords; 1960–1963	Succeeded by The Lord Carrington
Academic offices
Preceded by Rab Butler	Rector of the University of Glasgow; 1959–1962	Succeeded by Albert Lutuli
Peerage of the United Kingdom
Preceded by Douglas Hogg	Viscount Hailsham; 1950–1963	Disclaimed Title next held by Douglas Hogg
