= Douglas Hogg, 1st Viscount Hailsham =

British politician and judge (1872–1950)

The Right Honourable The Viscount Hailsham PC
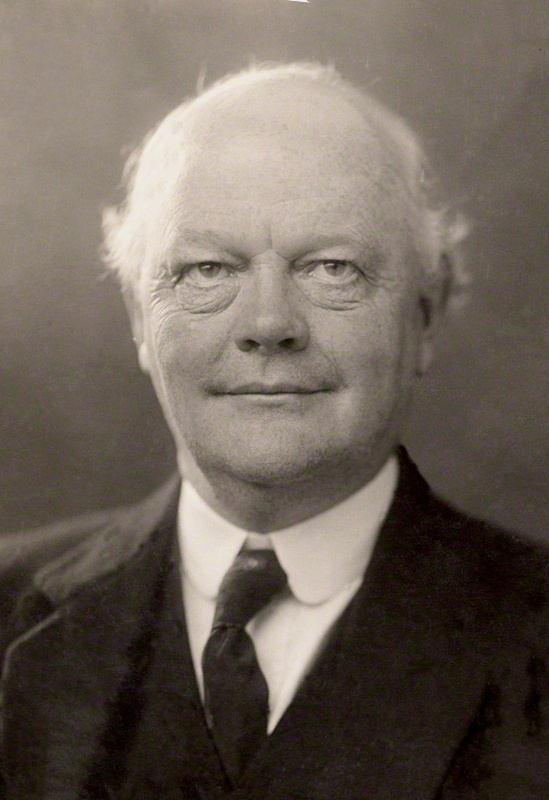
- Hailsham in 1930

Lord Chancellor Lord High Steward for the trial of: List: The Lord de Clifford
- In office 28 March 1928 – 4 June 1929
- Monarch: George V
- Prime Minister: Stanley Baldwin
- Preceded by: The Viscount Cave
- Succeeded by: The Lord Sankey
- In office 7 June 1935 – 9 March 1938
- Monarchs: George V; Edward VIII; George VI
- Prime Minister: Stanley Baldwin; Neville Chamberlain
- Preceded by: The Viscount Sankey
- Succeeded by: The Lord Maugham

Lord President of the Council
- In office 9 March 1938 – 31 October 1938
- Prime Minister: Neville Chamberlain
- Preceded by: The Viscount Halifax
- Succeeded by: The Viscount Runciman of Doxford

Leader of the House of Lords
- In office 5 November 1931 – 7 June 1935
- Prime Minister: Ramsay MacDonald
- Preceded by: The Marquess of Reading
- Succeeded by: The Marquess of Londonderry

Secretary of State for War
- In office 5 November 1931 – 7 June 1935
- Prime Minister: Ramsay MacDonald
- Preceded by: The Marquess of Crewe
- Succeeded by: The Viscount Halifax

Attorney General for England and Wales
- In office 6 November 1924 – 4 April 1928
- Prime Minister: Stanley Baldwin
- Preceded by: Sir Patrick Hastings
- Succeeded by: Sir Thomas Inskip
- In office 24 October 1922 – 22 January 1924
- Prime Minister: Bonar Law; Stanley Baldwin
- Preceded by: Sir Ernest Pollock
- Succeeded by: Sir Patrick Hastings

Member of Parliament for St Marylebone
- In office 15 November 1922 – 28 March 1928
- Preceded by: Sir Samuel Scott
- Succeeded by: Rennell Rodd

Personal details
- Born: Douglas McGarel Hogg; 28 February 1872 London, England
- Died: 16 August 1950 (aged 78) Hailsham, England
- Party: Conservative
- Spouses: Elizabeth Marjoribanks (m. 1905; died 1925); Mildred Margaret (m. 1929)
- Children: 2, including Quintin

Douglas McGarel Hogg, 1st Viscount Hailsham, PC (28 February 1872 – 16 August 1950) was a British lawyer and Conservative politician who twice served as Lord Chancellor, in addition to a number of other Cabinet positions. Mooted as a possible successor to Stanley Baldwin as party leader for a time in the very early 1930s, he was widely considered to be one of the leading Conservative politicians of his generation.

== Early life ==
Born in London, Hogg was the son of the merchant and philanthropist Quintin Hogg and of Alice Anna Hogg, née Graham (d. 1918). Both of his grandfathers, Sir James Hogg, 1st Baronet, and William Graham, were Members of Parliament. He was educated at Cheam School and Eton College, before spending eight years working for the family firm of sugar merchants, spending time in the West Indies and British Guiana. During the Boer War he served with the 19th (Berwick and Lothian) Yeomanry, and was wounded in action and decorated.

== Legal career ==
Returning from South Africa, he was called to the bar at Lincoln's Inn in 1902. Despite starting at the bar relatively late in life, as a junior barrister, he built up a large practice in both common law and commercial law. His son later believed that Hogg was earning £14,000 per annum (around £1.4m at 2018 prices) by 1914.

Sir John Simon later wrote of him: "Hogg had all the qualities that go to make a leader at the bar: an accurate grasp of complicated facts, a clear view of the principles of law which had to be applied to them, a sturdy attitude in the face of the situation with which he had to deal, and a manner which was genial and conciliatory with a persuasive force behind it well calculated to win assent from the tribunal he was addressing. He was never at a loss, and no counsel was more adept at preparing the way to meet the difficulties of the case."

He was appointed King's Counsel in 1917, and became a bencher of Lincoln's Inn and Attorney-General to the Prince of Wales in 1920.

After his father's death in 1903 he also devoted considerable time to the Royal Polytechnic institution, which his father had founded.

== Political background ==
Hogg began to be involved in Conservative politics while still at the bar. He was involved in the Conservatives' legal attacks against the Liberals during the Marconi scandal.

Hogg's son Quintin later recalled that, probably around the time of the Curragh Incident in March 1914 when he was six years old, he had been presented to the adults at the close of a tea party, and had asked "Who is Winston Churchill?" Churchill, a leading member of the Liberal Cabinet at the time, was one of those apparently threatening some kind of military and naval action against Protestant Ulster; Hogg's brother Ian was then serving with the 4th Hussars at the Curragh. Hogg replied that he had always told his son that it was wicked to wish somebody dead (he had, Quintin recorded, never actually told him any such thing) but that if he did wish anyone dead it would be Winston Churchill. Hogg later claimed not to recollect the occasion, when his son reminded him of it in the 1920s; he and Churchill were (Conservative) Cabinet colleagues by then. On the outbreak of war in August 1914 Hogg was cheered by bystanders in a London park, who mistook him for Churchill, to whom he bore a slight physical resemblance.

Hogg was approached to be the Conservative Party candidate for Marylebone, but stood down before the 1918 election rather than fight the sitting member (Sir Samuel Scott) for the nomination.

== Attorney-General: 1922–1924 ==
The Lloyd George Coalition (Conservative-Liberal) collapsed as a result of the Carlton Club meeting in October 1922. Bonar Law formed a purely Conservative government but found himself short of law officers after many leading members of the Coalition refused to serve. Hogg, not yet an MP, was appointed Attorney General.

Harold Macmillan, who was not yet an MP, records the following exchange between the Earl of Derby and Duke of Devonshire (Macmillan's father-in-law):

'Ah,' said Lord Derby, 'you are too pessimistic. They have found a wonderful little man. One of those attorney fellows, you know. He will do all the work.' 'What's his name?', said the Duke. 'Pig,' said Lord Derby. Turning to me, the Duke replied, 'Do you know Pig? I know James Pigg [he was a great reader of Surtees]. I don't know any other Pig.' It turned out to be Sir Douglas Hogg! This was a truly Trollopian scene.

Bonar Law arranged for Hogg to be selected as Conservative candidate for the safe seat of St Marylebone. He was returned unopposed to the House of Commons in the November 1922 general election, at which Law's government won a comfortable majority.

Hogg therefore began his Commons career on the front bench, and within days had to help pilot through the House the bill which set up the Irish Free State constitution. Within four weeks of entering office he also had to assist Lord Chancellor Cave and Neville Chamberlain (Minister of Health) to write a reply from Baldwin (Chancellor of the Exchequer) to a delegation of the unemployed. Though not yet a full member of the Cabinet, he was sworn of the Privy Council and received the (then) customary knighthood (in December 1922). Hogg continued as Attorney-General when Stanley Baldwin became prime minister for the first time in May 1923.

Hogg spent much of this time at his country home in Sussex, where he had become a prominent county figure. He was a justice of the peace for the county from 1923. Even when he later became Lord Chancellor he sometimes continued to sit as an ordinary magistrate at Lewes.

The Conservatives lost their majority in the December 1923 election, which returned a hung Parliament. Hogg continued as Attorney General until the first Labour government, under Ramsay MacDonald, took office in January 1924.

Hogg maintained an active Commons role in opposition. Neville Chamberlain wrote that Hogg's speech during the debate which installed MacDonald "made a great impression and heartened up our party immensely". The same was true in the debate on the Campbell Case in October 1924, which brought down MacDonald's government. This time Chamberlain wrote that "Hogg's summing up was a real tour-de-force. Until then I confess to having been rattled by the special pleading on the other side and only when I heard Hogg did I realise how strong the case against the Govt still remained."

== Baldwin's second government: 1924–1929 ==
=== Attorney-General again ===
Later in October 1924, Hogg was reappointed Attorney-General, this time with a seat in the Cabinet, when the Conservatives were returned to power. Although Hogg played a full part in cabinet debates, his main responsibility was to advise the government on legal matters, and other ministers seem to have regarded him mainly as a lawyer–politician. He was the minister responsible for the arrest and prosecution of Harry Pollitt and a number of other British communists for subversion in October 1925, though credit was generally attributed to the better-known Home Secretary, William Joynson-Hicks. Hogg also gave legal advice over the general strike of 1926.

Hogg was popular among his colleagues, and despite his fierceness in debate he was not particularly disliked by his opponents. Neville Chamberlain wrote in 1926 that he was 'one of the best, straight and loyal and possessed of a wonderful brain. Moreover, he is a first-class fighting man' (Diary Letters, 338).

The Miners' Strike (technically a lockout) had continued after the General Strike, but had ended with large-scale unemployment while those still employed were forced to accept longer hours, lower wages, and district (rather than national) wage agreements. As Attorney-General, Hogg guided the Trade Disputes Act of 1927 through the House of Commons. This made mass picketing and secondary strikes (i.e. strikes by other unions who were not party to the dispute in hand) illegal and directed that union members had to "contract in" any political levy (i.e. members had to actively choose if they wished to make a donation to the Labour Party alongside their subscription). It also forbade civil service unions from affiliating with the Trades Union Congress.

Over the course of the government, Hogg began to be tipped as a future Home Secretary and perhaps even prime minister. In 1928 Austen Chamberlain wrote to one of his sisters about knotty legal issues that he faced at the Foreign Office, over which Hailsham 'was unable to help me to a decision, which if you knew him would alone be sufficient to show you how extremely difficult of solution these problems are'.

=== First term as Lord Chancellor ===
Viscount Cave retired as Lord Chancellor early in 1928. Hogg was offered the job but did not want to accept, on the grounds that it "barred any chance of the premiership" and appealed to Neville Chamberlain for help (26 March 1928) on the grounds that he did not want to see "W. Churchill" become prime minister after Baldwin. Chamberlain agreed, and felt that Churchill and his friend Lord Birkenhead were more likely to agree to serve in a future Hogg government than under Chamberlain (both Hogg and Chamberlain protested unconvincingly to one another that they did not particularly want to be prime minister). However, Baldwin insisted that Hogg accept the promotion. Besides his own reluctance to accept, he was also aware that a peerage might also inhibit the political ambitions of his elder son, Quintin Hogg, who was already active in student politics at Oxford University—as indeed it did.

On 29 March 1928, Hogg became Lord Chancellor, and on 5 April he was created Baron Hailsham, of Hailsham in the County of Sussex.

As the parliament ended in May 1929, Austen Chamberlain wrote that Hailsham's judgement was 'I think as good as that of any member of the Cabinet' (Diary Letters, 322, 330). He held the Great Seal for just over a year until the government's unexpected defeat in the 1929 election. In that year's Birthday Honours (3 June) he was promoted to Viscount Hailsham, of Hailsham in the County of Sussex.

== Opposition: 1929–1931 ==
Between 1929 and 1931, Hailsham was Leader of the Opposition in the House of Lords. He did not give strong support to Baldwin when the latter's leadership was attacked, and apparently did nothing to quash speculation that he might become leader himself. The former party whip Lord Bayford thought in March 1931 that 'the only possible suggestion made at present is that Hailsham should lead the party and Neville [Chamberlain] be leader in the Commons' (Real Old Tory Politics, p245).

As a former Lord Chancellor Hailsham continued to sit as a Law Lord. Sir John Simon identified a number of significant cases in the Lords in which his judgments 'illustrated his power of lucid reasoning and his command of appropriate language': Addie v. Dumbreck (injury to child trespasser, 1929); Tolley v. Fry (defamation, 1931); Swadling v. Cooper (contributory negligence, 1931).

Hailsham became president of Sussex County cricket club in 1931.

== Secretary of State for War: 1931–1935 ==
Hailsham was not offered a seat in the small emergency Cabinet of the National Government of August–October 1931, a fact which John Ramsden attributes to his disloyalty to Baldwin in opposition. Hailsham's previous job was not available, as the Labour Lord Chancellor Lord Sankey had joined the National Government; Hailsham was therefore offered, and refused, the sinecure post of Lord Privy Seal. After the October 1931 elections, with the Cabinet restored to a larger size, he joined the second National Government as Secretary of State for War and Leader of the House of Lords.

Hailsham was a strong supporter of protectionism (tariffs on goods imported into the British Empire, an aspiration for many Conservatives since Joseph Chamberlain had called for them in 1903). However, he suggested that the Cabinet "agree to differ" on the issue, so that the Conservatives could press on with plans for tariffs, while remaining in coalition with Liberals and National Labour; the free traders left the coalition once tariff plans had been agreed internationally. Hailsham was one of the ministers representing the National Government at the Ottawa Imperial Economic Conference in 1932. At Ottawa, Baldwin told his friend Tom Jones, "the bulk of the negotiations have been done by Neville [Chamberlain], 'ably assisted' (as the papers would say) by Hailsham", but Baldwin also wryly admitted that he had let those two do the work "because if they failed the Die-Hards at home would know it was not from half-hearted trying" (Jones, 49–50).

Hailsham served as President of the MCC in 1933. He was an important contributor to the diplomacy involved following the Bodyline Series problems of 1932–33 during the English Cricket tour of Australia under the captaincy of Douglas Jardine His presidency of the MCC in 1933 combined an interest in cricket with his earlier constituency connection with Marylebone.

Hailsham was also leader of the House of Lords from 1931 to 1935; in 1934–5 he had to handle Lord Salisbury's attacks on the government's plans to bring in greater Indian self-government. Hailsham was no longer as well-regarded in the Conservative party in the mid-1930s as ten years earlier.

As Secretary of State for War, Hailsham was popular with senior army officers. However, although he presided over the army's first serious rearmament plans, spending priority in 1934-5 was given to the Royal Air Force, and to a lesser extent the Royal Navy.

== Second term as Lord Chancellor: 1935–1938 ==
On 7 June 1935, to his apparent pleasure, Hailsham returned to the Lord Chancellorship under Stanley Baldwin, now prime minister for the third time. In December 1935 Hailsham had to preside over the last trial of a peer 'by his peers', when he was appointed Lord High Steward to conduct the trial of the 26th Baron de Clifford in the House of Lords for manslaughter. He ruled that there was no case for Lord de Clifford to answer, but also suggested that this mediaeval privilege was obsolete; the procedure was abolished in the Criminal Justice Act 1948. Hailsham earned plaudits both for presiding over House of Lords debates, and for leading the Law Lords. He was awarded honorary doctorates of letters or civil law by the universities of Belfast, Birmingham, Cambridge, Oxford, and Reading.

Although he was only in his mid sixties, Hailsham's health was already beginning to fail by 1936. He initially continued as Lord Chancellor under Baldwin's successor Neville Chamberlain from May 1937, but in March 1938 he transferred to the sinecure post of Lord President of the Council. In 1938 Hailsham suffered a serious stroke, which disabled his right side. He later learned to write with his left hand, but although his mind was clear he could no longer speak clearly. He had to retire from the government altogether on 31 October 1938, four days after his elder son Quintin had been elected to the Commons at a by-election. A Punch cartoon showed Hailsham as a cricketer heading back to the pavilion as his son came out to bat.

== Later life ==
On 14 October 1940, Hailsham was having dinner at the Carlton Club with his son Quintin, who was about to depart for active service as an army officer in North Africa. The club was hit by a bomb, and observers, including the diarist Harold Nicolson, likened the sight of Quintin carrying his disabled father from the building to Aeneas carrying his father Anchises on his back from the sack of Troy (the event, and the classical allusion, are also mentioned in Churchill's History of the Second World War).

Ill health prevented Hailsham from playing an active role in the House of Lords as a private member, though he continued to be as active as he could in such outside bodies as the Inns of Court regiment (honorary colonel, 1935–48) and the British Empire Cancer Campaign (chairman, 1936–50).

Hailsham died at his home in Hailsham, East Sussex, (which he had bought in 1917 after taking silk), on 16 August 1950, aged 78. He was buried in the churchyard of All Saints', Herstmonceux. The title passed to his son Quintin. His estate was valued for probate at £225,032 18s. 2d (around £7m at 2018 prices).

== Assessments ==
John Ramsden suggests that rapid success, coming to a man who entered politics at the late age of fifty, made him "overplay his hand" in the events of 1929–31, even though as a peer by then he could not reasonably hope to be prime minister. William Bridgeman recorded in his diary that Hogg's success had not impaired "his great ability in debate, though it did I think interfere with his political judgement … He never suffered a reverse until the defeat of the party in 1929, an experience which would have been beneficial if he had had it."

The diarist Chips Channon thought that Hailsham looked like Gilbert and Sullivan's lord chancellor in his robes, but, as Lord Denning later recalled, if he 'looked like Mr. Pickwick', he also 'spoke like Demosthenes'.

== Family ==
On 14 August 1905, Hogg married Elizabeth Marjoribanks, daughter of James Trimble Brown, an American judge from Tennessee. She was the widow of his cousin, the Hon. Archibald Marjoribanks (son of Dudley Marjoribanks, 1st Baron Tweedmouth).

Hogg acquired two stepchildren from Elizabeth's previous marriage. One of these was Edward Marjoribanks (born 1900), who became a Conservative MP in 1929 but committed suicide in 1932.

Hogg and his wife had two sons:

- Quintin McGarel Hogg, 2nd Viscount Hailsham, later Baron Hailsham of St Marylebone (born 9 October 1907, died 12 October 2001), barrister and politician, who disclaimed the viscountcy, but was later given a life peerage and himself became Lord Chancellor.
- Hon William Neil McGarel Hogg (born 1910, died 13 February 1995), diplomat.

Elizabeth suffered a stroke in 1923, and died in May 1925, shortly after they had visited the British Empire Exhibition at Wembley Park together. Her poor health had brought them closer together, and Hogg felt that they had become like newlyweds again. Quintin, then aged seventeen, had to answer many of the condolence letters himself, and later recorded that for four years afterwards he could hear his father in his bedroom at night "literally shouting with agony".

On 3 January 1929, Lord Hailsham, as he now was, married a second time, to Mildred Margaret (d. 1964), daughter of Edward Parker Dew and widow of Alfred Clive Lawrence. They had no children.

== Bibliography ==
- Charmley, John (1995) [1993], Churchill: The End of Glory, Sceptre, ISBN 978-0340599228
- Hailsham, Lord (1991). A Sparrow's Flight. Oxford University Press. ISBN 978-0-00-637721-4. (son's memoirs)

Parliament of the United Kingdom
Preceded by Sir Samuel Scott	Member of Parliament for St Marylebone; 1922–1928	Succeeded by Sir Rennell Rodd
Legal offices
Preceded by Ernest Pollock	Attorney General; 1922–1924	Succeeded by Patrick Hastings
Preceded by Patrick Hastings	Attorney General; 1924–1928	Succeeded by Thomas Inskip
Political offices
Preceded by The Viscount Cave	Lord High Chancellor of Great Britain; 1928–1929	Succeeded by The Viscount Sankey
Preceded by The Marquess of Crewe	Secretary of State for War; 1931–1935	Succeeded by The Viscount Halifax
Preceded by The Marquess of Reading	Leader of the House of Lords; 1931–1935	Succeeded by The Marquess of Londonderry
Preceded by The Viscount Sankey	Lord High Chancellor of Great Britain; 1935–1938	Succeeded by The Lord Maugham
Preceded by The Viscount Halifax	Lord President of the Council; 1938	Succeeded by The Viscount Runciman of Doxford
Party political offices
Preceded by The Marquess of Salisbury	Leader of the Conservative Party in the House of Lords; 1931–1935	Succeeded by The Marquess of Londonderry
Peerage of the United Kingdom
New creation	Viscount Hailsham; 1929–1950	Succeeded by Quintin Hogg
New creation	Baron Hailsham; 1928–1950	Succeeded by Quintin Hogg
