= Sir James Hogg, 1st Baronet =

Irish-born businessman, lawyer and politician

The Right Honourable Sir James Hogg, Bt PC
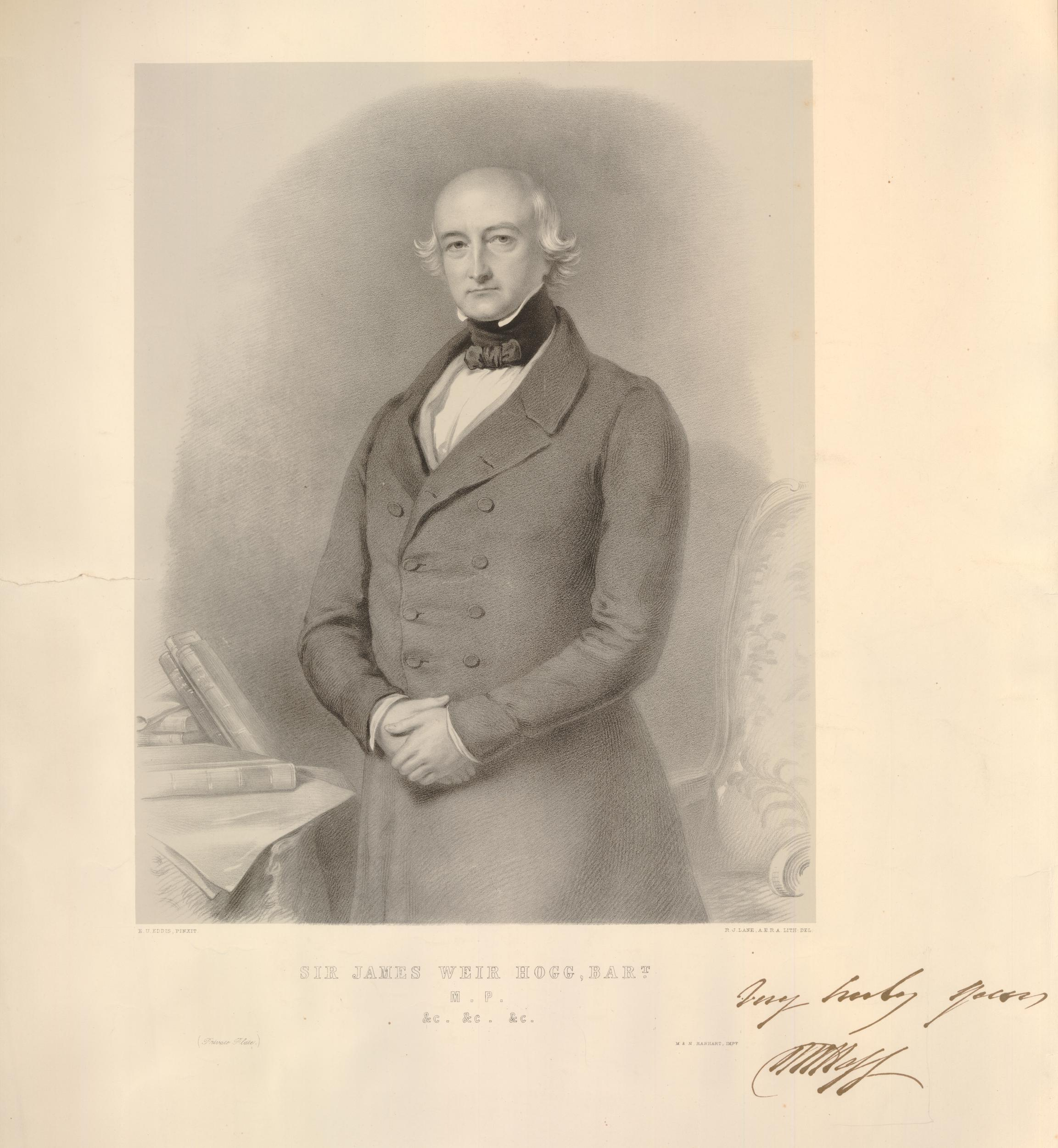
- Portrait of Sir James, c. 1850

Member of Parliament for Honiton
- In office 1847–1857 Serving with Joseph Locke
- Preceded by: Hugh Duncan Baillie; Forster Alleyne McGeachy
- Succeeded by: Joseph Locke; Archibald Stuart-Wortley

Member of Parliament for Beverley
- In office 1835–1847 Serving with Henry Burton, George Lane-Fox, Sackville Lane-Fox, John Towneley
- Preceded by: Henry Burton; Hon. Charles Langdale
- Succeeded by: John Towneley; Sackville Lane-Fox

Personal details
- Born: James Weir Hogg; 7 September 1790 Lisburn, County Antrim, Ireland
- Died: 27 May 1876 (aged 85)
- Spouse: Mary Swinton (after 1822)
- Relations: John Nicholson (nephew)
- Children: 14, including James, Stuart, Quintin
- Parent(s): William Hogg; Mary Dickey
- Education: Trinity College Dublin

Sir James Weir Hogg, 1st Baronet PC (7 September 1790 – 27 May 1876), was an Irish-born businessman, lawyer and politician and Chairman of the East India Company.

== Early life ==
Hogg was born in Lisburn, County Antrim, Ireland, on 7 September 1790. He was the eldest son of William Hogg and Mary (née Dickey) Hogg. Among his siblings were Clara Hogg, who married Dr. Alexander Jaffrey Nicholson; Rosina Hogg, who married Dr. William Thompson; Charles Hogg; and Lily Anne Maria Hogg, who married Augustus Charles Floyer and James Robert Campbell.

A descendant of Protestant Scottish settlers who had immigrated to Ireland as part of the Ulster Plantation, his paternal grandparents were Edward Hogg and Rose (née O'Neill) Hogg (the daughter of Rev. John O'Neill). His maternal grandfather was James Dickey of Dunmore, County Antrim.

Hogg was educated at Dr Bruce's Academy, Belfast, and later at Trinity College Dublin, where he was elected a Scholar. Hogg was the uncle and patron of General John Nicholson.

== Career ==
He was called to the Bar and proceeded to India in 1814, where he obtained a large and lucrative practice. In 1822 he accepted the appointment of Registrar of the Supreme Court of Judicature, Calcutta, which he held until his return to England in 1833. In 1839 he was elected a Director of the East India Company.

He was elected MP for Beverley in 1834, and represented Honiton from 1847 to 1857, which seat he lost by two votes at the general election that year. He was the founder of a political dynasty which is still represented by his descendent, Viscount Hailsham.

Hogg was twice Chairman of the East India Company, and in 1858 when the government of India was transferred to The Crown he was elected member of the Council of India, until his resignation in 1872, aged eighty two.

He was created a Baronet, of Upper Grosvenor Street in the County of London, in 1846, and was offered the posts of Judge Advocate General and the Governorship of Bombay, both of which he refused.

Hogg had made himself extremely wealthy. In 1846, he took a 65-year lease on 16/17 Grosvenor Square and had major changes made, including moving the staircase and adding a stone portico. However in 1854, Hogg sold the lease and the contents of the Grosvenor Square house and, in 1856, moved to No 4 Carlton Gardens in Mayfair.

== Personal life ==
On 26 July 1822, Hogg married Mary Claudine Swinton, the daughter of and Isabella (née Routledge) Swinton and Samuel Swinton of Swinton House, Swinton, Berwickshire. Together, Sir James and Lady Hogg had fourteen children, many of whom married into the nobility, including:

- Isabella Hogg (1822–1908), who married Dudley Marjoribanks, 1st Baron Tweedmouth, a son of Edward Marjoribanks and Georgiana de Lautour, in 1848.
- Florence Hogg (d. 1916), who married George William Campbell, son of Colin Campbell, 1st of Colgrain, and Janet Miller Hamilton, in 1865.
- James MacNaghten McGarel-Hogg, 1st Baron Magheramorne (1823–1890), who married Hon. Caroline Elizabeth Emma Douglas-Pennant, daughter of Edward Douglas-Pennant, 1st Baron Penrhyn, and Juliana Isabella Mary Dawkins-Pennant (a daughter of George Hay Dawkins-Pennant), in 1857.
- Charles Swinton Hogg (1824–1870), who married Harriet Anne Stirling, daughter of Sir Walter Stirling, 2nd Baronet, and Lady Caroline Frances Byng (a daughter of the 1st Earl of Strafford), in 1860.
- Mary Rosina Hogg (1829–1913), who married Charles McGarel of Magheramorne, County Antrim, in 1856.
- Fergusson Floyer Hogg (1829–1862) of the Bengal Civil Service; he married Elizabeth Helen Parsons, daughter of Hon. Laurence Parsons (son of the 2nd Earl of Rosse) and Lady Elizabeth Graham-Toler (daughter of the 2nd Earl of Norbury), in 1861.
- Annie Claudina Hogg (1831–1921), who never married.
- Sir Stuart Saunders Hogg (1833–1921), the Police Commissioner of Calcutta; he married Selina Catherine Perry, daughter of Sir Thomas Erskine Perry and Louisa McElkiney, in 1860.
- Sir Frederick Russell Hogg (1836–1923), who married Emily Eckford, daughter of Lt.-Gen. James Eckford, in 1857. They divorced in 1873 and he married Harriett Venn Dicken, daughter of William Stephens Dicken, in 1885. Harriett's sister Catherine married Henry Browne, 5th Marquess of Sligo.
- Amy Hogg (c. 1838–1871), who married James William MacNabb, son of James Munro MacNabb of Highfield House, Heckfield, and Jane Mary Campbell, in 1860.
- Stapleton Cotton Hogg (1839–1918), the Assistant Finance Secretary, India Office; he died unmarried.
- Constance Hogg (1842–1872), who married Francis Augustus Bevan, son of Robert Cooper Lee Bevan and Agneta Elizabeth Yorke (a daughter of Hon. Sir Joseph Sidney Yorke), in 1866.
- Quintin Hogg (1845–1903), a merchant who married Alice Anna Graham, daughter of William Graham and Jane Catherine Lowndes, in 1871.

Sir James died in 1876, aged 85. On his death in 1876, he was succeeded in the baronetcy by his son James Hogg, who, on 5 July 1887, was created Baron Magheramorne, of Magheramorne in the County of Antrim, in the Peerage of the United Kingdom, as part of the celebrations for the Golden Jubilee of Queen Victoria. Hogg's title passed around several branches of his descendants but was ultimately inherited by the branch of his second son, Charles Swinton Hogg, whose son Ernest Charles Hogg married a member of the Peel family and he was the father to Sir Arthur Ramsay Hogg, 7th Baronet.

=== Descendants ===
Through his eldest daughter Isabella, he was a grandfather of Edward Marjoribanks, 2nd Baron Tweedmouth of Edington, who married Lady Fanny Octavia Louise Spencer-Churchill (a daughter of the 7th Duke of Marlborough and an aunt of Winston Churchill), and Dame Ishbel Marjoribanks, who married John Hamilton-Gordon, 1st Marquess of Aberdeen and Temair.

Through his daughter Florence, he was a grandfather of Colin Campbell, 1st Baron Colgrain.

Through his seventh son Quintin, he was a grandfather of Douglas Hogg, 1st Viscount Hailsham, and Sir Malcolm Nicholson Hogg, who also served on the Council of India, and great-grandfather of Quintin Hogg, Baron Hailsham of St Marylebone.

== See also ==
- Hogg baronets
- John Nicholson (East India Company officer)

Parliament of the United Kingdom
Preceded by Henry Burton; Hon. Charles Langdale	Member of Parliament for Beverley; 1835–1847; With: Henry Burton 1835–1837; George Lane-Fox 1837–1840; Sackville Lane-Fox 1840–1841; John Towneley 1841–1846	Succeeded by John Towneley; Sackville Lane-Fox
Preceded by Hugh Duncan Baillie; Forster Alleyne McGeachy	Member of Parliament for Honiton; 1847–1857; With: Joseph Locke	Succeeded by Joseph Locke; Archibald Stuart-Wortley
Baronetage of the United Kingdom
New creation	Baronet (of Upper Grosvenor Street); 1846–1876	Succeeded by James McGarel-Hogg
