= Quintin Hogg (merchant) =

English merchant and philanthropist (1845-1903)

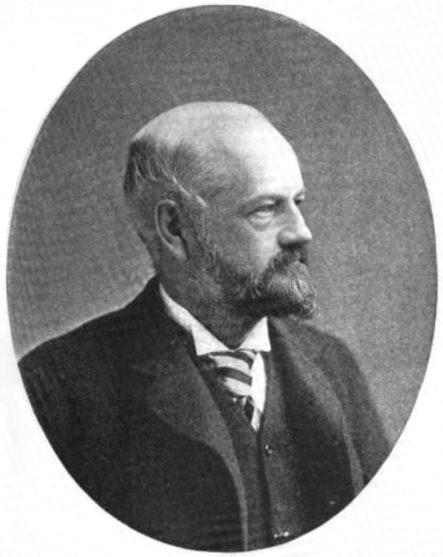
- In The Sketch, 28 February 1900
- Born: 14 February 1845; London, England
- Died: 17 January 1903 (aged 57)
- Education: Eton College
- Occupation: Tea merchant
- Known for: Royal Polytechnic institution
- Spouse: Alice Anna Graham (m. 1871)
- Children: 5, Douglas Hogg, 1st Viscount Hailsham; Elsie Florence Hogg; Ian Graham; Ethel Mary Hogg; Malcolm Nicholson Hogg
- Father: Sir James Hogg, 1st Baronet
- Relatives: James McGarel-Hogg, 1st Baron Magheramorne (brother)
Association football career
Senior career*
Years	Team	Apps	(Gls)
1865–71	Wanderers FC	31	
1874–76	Old Etonians		
International career
1870-1872	Scotland	2	
- * Club domestic league appearances and goals

Quintin Hogg (14 February 1845 – 17 January 1903) was an English philanthropist, remembered primarily as a benefactor of the Royal Polytechnic institution at Regent Street, London, now the University of Westminster.

== Early life ==
Hogg, the seventh son of Sir James Hogg, 1st Baronet, was born and spent most of his life in London. He was educated at Eton College, where he was known as "Piggy Hogg". Hogg was a keen and accomplished sportsman, and along with other Etonians he was a pioneer of Association Football. Whilst at Eton, he won the Eton Fives, was keeper of fives and in the shooting XI, and was a member of the Wall and Field football XIs. He showed strong religious convictions and held prayer meetings; he was also a prominent rifle volunteer.

He made 31 appearances for Wanderers F.C. (winners of the first F.A. Cup) between the 1865–66 and the 1870–71 seasons. He twice represented Scotland versus England in the unofficial internationals of 1870 and 1871. He captained the Old Etonians for seven years, during which period he was never on the losing side. He came back to the side in 1874 as goalkeeper, and played in the 1876 FA Cup final for the Old Etonians, but missed the replay.

He became involved in trade, particularly the commodities of tea and sugar. As a senior partner in a firm of tea merchants, he modernised sugar production in Demerara at the plantation of his brother-in-law, the former slave owner Charles McGarel. While in Demerara he played two first-class cricket matches for the colony.

== Educational reform ==
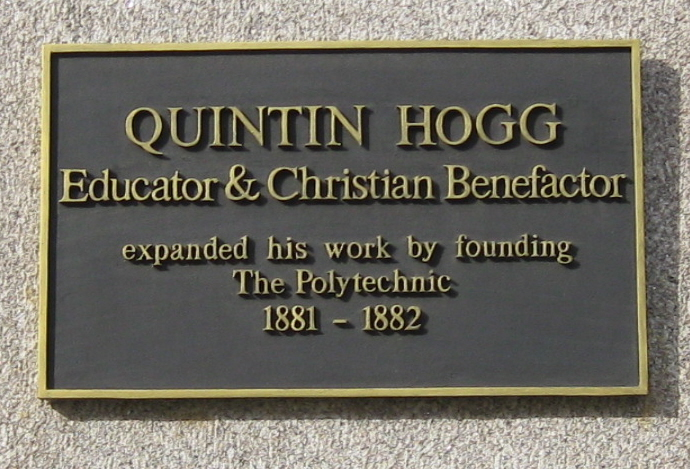
Plaque at the Polytechnic entrance, Regent Street

Having made his fortune, he became concerned with Christian-motivated philanthropy. Much of London and its population at the time suffered from extremely deprived social conditions. Hogg turned his energy to educational reform: in 1864 he founded York Place Ragged School. With Arthur Fitzgerald Kinnaird (1847–1923, later 11th Baron Kinnaird) and Thomas Henry William Pelham (1847–1916), he rented rooms in York Place (formerly Alley), off The Strand in central London, for a boys' school, initially a day school, later open in the evenings. In 1882, he founded the Young Men's Christian Institute, which was renamed the Regent Street Polytechnic (incorporating the Royal Polytechnic Institution). The polytechnic was later part of Polytechnic of Central London (PCL) and is now the University of Westminster. It is the largest provider of adult education in London, and its headquarters are still at the same location on Regent Street.

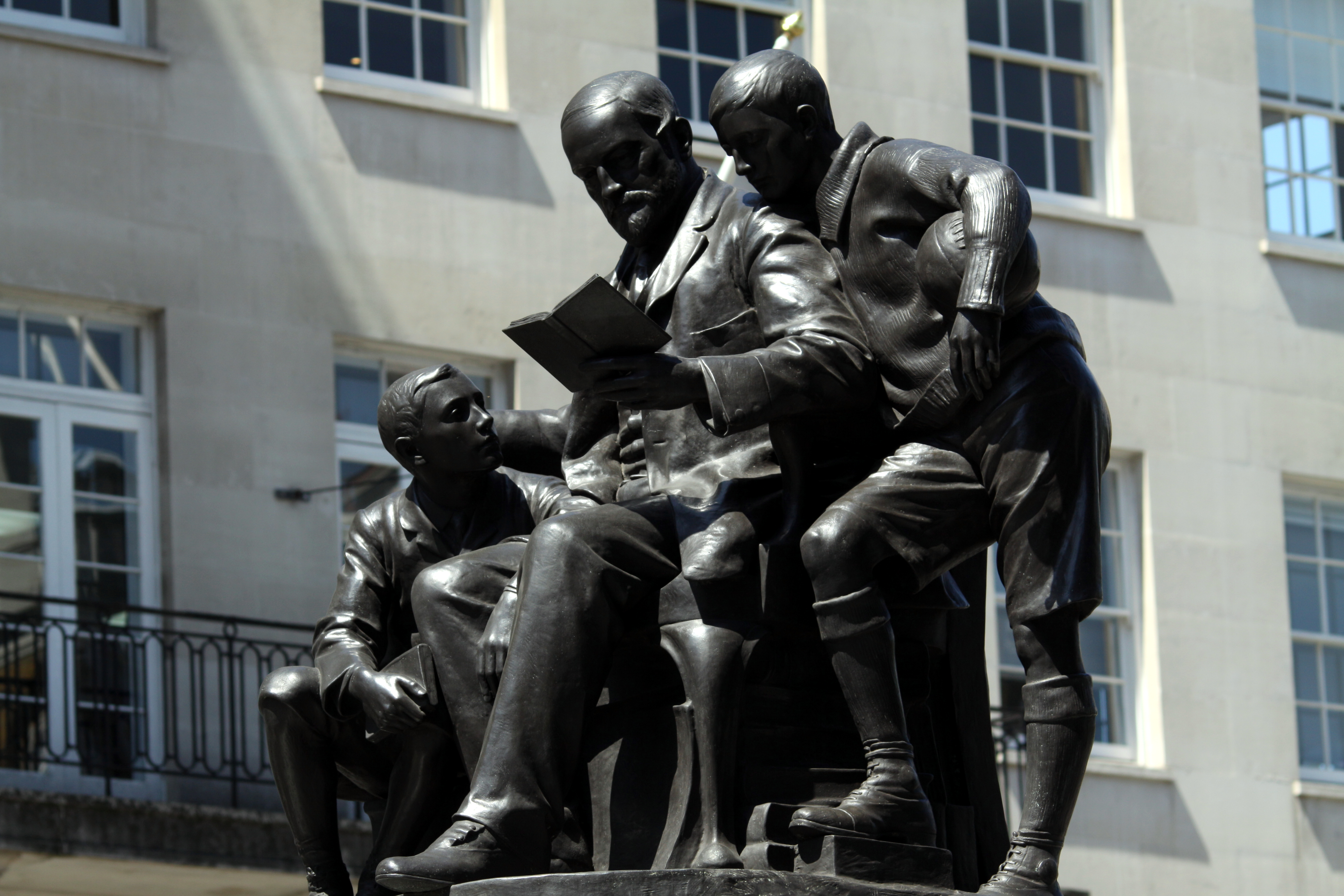
Memorial statue in Portland Place

== Other ==
Hogg was an alderman of the first London County Council, encouraging the founding of other polytechnics, then called working men's (or mechanics') institutes. For example, in 1886, he was consulted by Frank Didden about establishing a polytechnic in Woolwich (Hogg had founded a ragged school in Castle Street, Woolwich); Woolwich Polytechnic, England's second polytechnic, eventually opened in 1891.

== Personal life ==
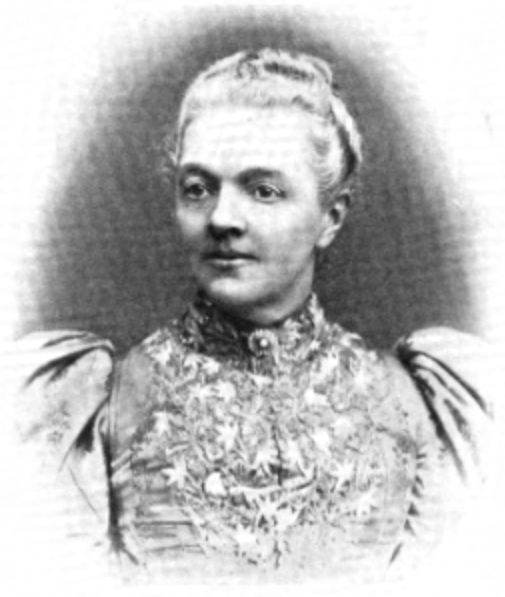
Alice Hogg in 1900

He married Alice Anna Graham, daughter of William Graham, on 16 May 1871, in the St George Hanover Square parish. They had three sons and two daughters:

- Douglas Hogg, 1st Viscount Hailsham (1872–1950), the father of Quintin Hogg, Baron Hailsham of St Marylebone (1907–2001)
- Elsie Florence Hogg (1873–?), married Vincent Robertson Hoare (1873–1915)
- Ian Graham Hogg (1875–1914), lieutenant colonel, died September 1914 of wounds.
- Ethel Mary Hogg (1876–1970), married Herbert Frederick Wood. She wrote a biography of her father, as Ethel M. Wood;
- Malcolm Nicholson Hogg (1883–1948)

Hogg died in the bath while staying at the Polytechnic in 1903. An inquest found death was due to asphyxiation from an inadequately ventilated gas heater. His funeral took place at All Souls, Langham Place, followed by cremation. His ashes were buried at the East Finchley Cemetery.

His wealth at death was valued for probate at £161,253 8s. 9d (around £17m at 2018 prices).

== Principal sources ==
- Woods, Gabriel Stanley (1912). "Hogg, Quintin" . In Lee, Sidney (ed.). Dictionary of National Biography (2nd supplement). London: Smith, Elder & Co.
- Stearn, Roger T. (2016) [2004]. "Hogg, Quintin (1845–1903)". Oxford Dictionary of National Biography (online ed.). Oxford University Press. doi:10.1093/ref:odnb/33926. (Subscription, Wikipedia Library access or UK public library membership required.)
- Hailsham, Lord (1991). A Sparrow's Flight. Oxford University Press. ISBN 978-0-00-637721-4. (grandson's memoirs)
