= Edward Brydges Willyams =

British politician (1834–1916)

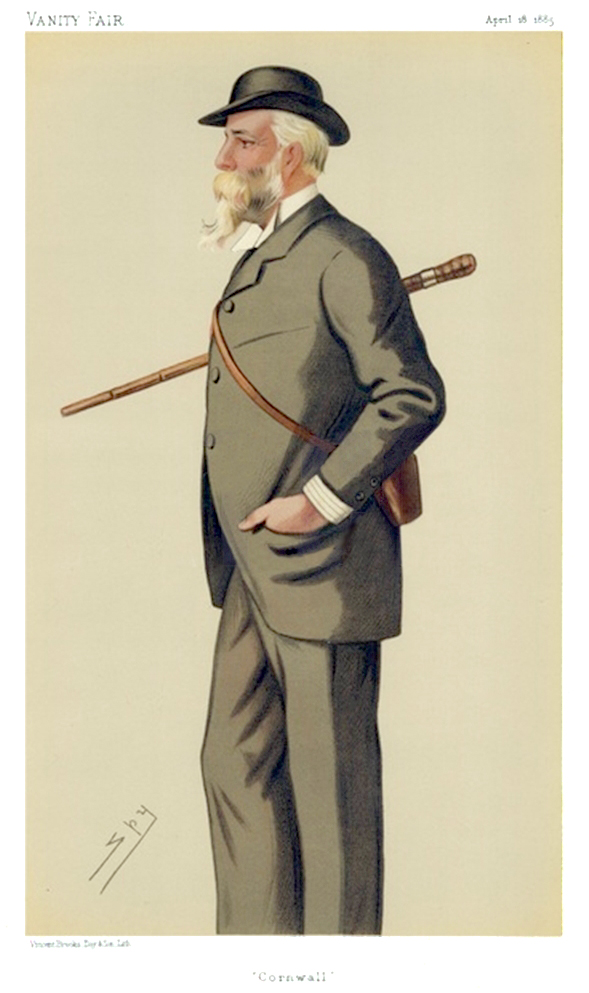
Caricature by Spy published in Vanity Fair in 1885.

Edward William Brydges Willyams (5 November 1834 – 10 October 1916) was a Liberal MP, successively for three Cornish constituencies. In 1892, he was appointed High Sheriff of Cornwall.

== Life ==
Willyams was born 6 November 1834, the son of Humphry Willyams, a banker, land-owner and Liberal elector of Truro and Ellen Frances Brydges Neynoe, his wife. She was the daughter of Colonel William Brydges Neynoe of Castle Neynoe, County Sligo.

His older brother, James Willyams died aged 38 in 1861.

His aunt by marriage Sarah Brydges Willyams, was an heiress, who married his father's elder brother James and had no children. However, when she died in 1863, she gave three-quarters of her fortune to Benjamin Disraeli, a great friend of hers and she was interred next to him in the Disraeli vault at Hughenden, Buckinghamshire.

Willyams was educated at Merton College, Oxford.

He was married twice, first to Jane, youngest daughter of Sir Trevor Wheler, Bt. on 26 June 1856 and then on 5 June 1882 to Emily, a daughter of Sir Joseph Moses Levy, the proprietor of The Daily Telegraph, which then supported the Liberal Party. Emily Brydges Willyams died 5 February 1902.

He died on Tuesday, 10 October 1916, at his seat, Carnanton House, St Columb Major.

== Parliamentary service ==
- MP for Truro from 1857 to 1859.
- MP for East Cornwall, 1868–1874.
- MP for Truro, 1880–1885.

He stood for election at St Austell in 1887, as a Liberal Unionist but was defeated by the Gladstonian candidate, and at the Truro by-election in 1878 he lost to the Conservative candidate Arthur Tremayne.

== Interests ==
He was a keen supporter of the old Cornish sport of hurling. Racing reports in The Times from 1884 to 1910 show his ownership of several race-horses, during this period.

== Difficulties ==
He was the co-respondent in a divorce in 1871/72, having carried on an affair with Lady Jolliffe, the wife of Captain Jolliffe, MP for Wells. He did not stand at the General Election in 1874.

Olive Willyams, the wife of his heir, Arthur Hugh Vivien Willyams, tried to obtain £4,000 from him, using promissory notes that he claimed were forged by her. She was committed to prison for three years and was afterwards declared to have become insane.

== Sources ==
- Obituary of Edward Brydges Willyams in The Times, Thursday, 12 Oct 1916; p. 11; Issue 41296; column E.
- Edwin Jaggard Cornwall Politics in the Age of Reform 1790–1855, Royal Historical Society/Boydell Press, (1999), ISBN 0-86193-243-9, Chapter 6–8.

Parliament of the United Kingdom
Preceded by John Vivian; Sir Henry Vivian	Member of Parliament for Truro; 1857–1859; With: Augustus Smith	Succeeded by Augustus Smith; Montague Edward Smith
Preceded by Thomas Agar-Robartes; Nicholas Kendall	Member of Parliament for Cornwall East; 1868–1874; With: Sir John Salusbury-Trelawny, Bt.	Succeeded by Sir Colman Rashleigh; John Tremayne
Preceded by John Cranch Walker and Sir Frederick Williams, Bt.	Member of Parliament for Truro; 1880–1885; With: James McGarel-Hogg	Succeeded by William Bickford-Smith
