= Carminow =

Carminow is an Anglo-Cornish surname, sometimes spelled Carminowe

It may refer to:

- John Carminow or Carminowe (c. 1516 – 1592), MP
- Nicholas Carminow or Carminowe (c. 1519 – 1569), MP
- Oliver Carminow or Carminowe (died 1597), MP
- a family from Cornwall who were involved in the Scrope v. Grosvenor controversy with the Scrope and Grosvenor families about their coat of arms
  - a Cornish knight of that family, Thomas Carminow, deployed to France in 1360
