= Carminowe =

Carminowe is a surname of Anglo-Cornish origin, which can also be spelled Carminow. Notable people with the surname include:

- John Carminow or Carminowe (c. 1516 – 1592), courtier
- Nicholas Carminow or Carminowe (c. 1519 – 1569), MP
- Oliver Carminow or Carminowe (died 1597), MP
