= Trenewith =

Trenewith is a surname. Notable people with the surname include:

- Ralph Trenewith (disambiguation), multiple people
- Stephen Trenewith, MP for Bodmin (UK Parliament constituency)
- Nicholas Trenewith, MP for Truro (UK Parliament constituency)

== See also ==
- Trenwith
