= Samuel Butcher =

Samuel Butcher may refer to:

- Samuel Butcher (Royal Navy officer) (1770–1849), British naval officer
- Samuel Butcher (bishop) (1811–1876), Bishop of Meath, 1866–1876, son of the above
- Samuel Butcher (classicist) (1850–1910), Anglo-Irish classical scholar and politician, son of the above
- Sam Butcher (1939–2024), American artist
