= 1878 Truro by-election =

UK parliamentary by-election

The Truro by-election 1878 was a parliamentary by-election held for the House of Commons of the United Kingdom constituency of Truro on 26 September 1878.

== Vacancy ==
The by-election was fought due to the death of the incumbent Conservative MP, Sir Frederick Williams.

== The result ==
It was won by the Conservative candidate Arthur Tremayne.

Truro by-election, 26 September 1878
Party	Candidate	Votes	%	±%
Conservative	Arthur Tremayne	656	51.8	−8.1
Liberal	Edward Willyams	611	48.2	+8.1
Majority		45	3.6	−2.7
Turnout		1,267	80.3	0.0
Conservative hold		Swing	-8.1	
