= William Stanford (judge) =

16th-century English politician and jurist

Sir William Stanford (1509 – 1558), also written Stamford or Staunford, was an English politician, judge and jurist.

== Origins ==
Born on or by 22 August 1509 at Monken Hadley in Middlesex, he was the second son of William Stanford, a mercer (textile dealer) in the City of London, and his wife Margaret Gedney. His father was a younger son of Robert Stanford, of Rowley Regis in Staffordshire.

== Career ==
After some time at the University of Oxford, he then studied law, entering Gray's Inn in 1528 and being called to the bar in 1536. At Gray's Inn, he was chosen Reader in 1544 and 1551.

By 1542, with a powerful friend at court in Sir Thomas Wriothesley and being owed money by Henry Stafford, he was elected MP for Stafford in the 1542 and 1545 Parliaments, and for Newcastle-under-Lyme in the 1547 Parliament. Though based in Middlesex, he developed Staffordshire links by buying the manors of Perry Barr and Handsworth.

From 1542 to 1555, he was appointed to many royal commissions, some ranging over all England and Wales and some limited to Middlesex. In 1543 he was made a justice of the peace for Middlesex, later sitting on the bench for Cornwall, Devon, Dorset, Hampshire, Somerset and Wiltshire.

Made a serjeant-at-law in 1552, Queen Mary I promoted him to Queen's Serjeant in 1553. Next year, though his prosecution of Sir Nicholas Throckmorton for treason was unsuccessful (with Throckmorton praising him for his erudition and honesty), he was appointed a justice of the Court of Common Pleas and was knighted the following year. Though a Catholic, he is reported to have treated Protestants fairly.

He made his will on 4 April 1558 and died at Monken Hadley on 28 August, leaving his wife as executrix and his eldest son as heir.

== Writings ==
He is said to have prepared the first printed edition of Glanvill's Tractatus de legibus et consuetudinibus regni Anglie and in 1557 published the first textbook of English criminal law; Les Plees del Coron. In 1567 his An Exposicion of the Kinges Prerogative (which he wrote in 1548) was published. William Fulbecke wrote in A Direction or Preparative to the Study of the Law (1600):

In Master Staunford there is force and weight, and no common kind of stile; in matter none hath gone beyonde him, in method, none hath overtaken him; in the order of his writing hee is smoothe, yet sharpe, pleasant, but yet grave; famous both for Judgement in matters of his profession, and for his great skill in forraigne learning, And surely his method may be a Law to the writers of the Law which succeed him.

In historic legal citations, Stanford's name is abbreviated "Stamf.", "Stanf.", or "Staunf.". Les Plees del Coron received the abbreviation "P.C." or "Plc", so the work is cited as "Stamf. P.C.", or similar.

== Family ==
He married Alice, daughter of John Palmer (died 1542), of Kentish Town and his wife Eleanor (died 1558), daughter of Edward Cheeseman and sister of Robert Cheeseman. They are recorded as having six sons and five daughters, including:

Sir Robert (1540-1607), the eldest son, who remained a Catholic and moved to Perry Hall in Staffordshire, becoming sheriff of that county in 1589 and MP in 1604.
Ralph, a Catholic priest.

His widow Alice later married Roger Carew, MP for St Albans in 1563, and died in 1573.
