= William Rous (died c. 1635) =

William Rous (c. 1594 – c. 1635) was an English politician who sat in the House of Commons in 1625.

Rous was the son of Ambrose Rous, of Halton, Cornwall. He matriculated at Broadgates Hall, Oxford on 14 February 1612, aged 17 and was a student of Middle Temple in 1614. In 1625, he was elected Member of Parliament for Truro.

Rous died before 20 June 1635 when administration of his estate was granted.

Parliament of England
Preceded by Richard Daniel; Thomas Burgess	Member of Parliament for Truro; 1625; With: Henry Rolle	Succeeded by Henry Rolle; Francis Rous
