= William Trethake =

William Trethake may refer to:

- William Trethake I, MP for Truro (UK Parliament constituency) in 1414
- William Trethake II, MP for Truro (UK Parliament constituency) 1421-1433 and Helston (UK Parliament constituency) 1420
