= John Trefusis =

English politician

Arms of Trefusis: Argent, a chevron between three spindles sable

John Trefusis (c. 1586 – 1647) lord of the manor of Trefusis in the parish of Mylor in Cornwall, was an English politician who sat in the House of Commons from 1621 to 1622.

== Origins ==
Trefusis was the eldest son and heir of John Trefusis (d.1603) of Trefusis by his wife Mary Gaverigan, a daughter and co-heiress of Walter Gaverigan of Gaverigan, Cornwall. The Trefusis family (anciently de Trefusis) continue in 2015 as lords of the manor of Trefusis, from which they took their surname at some time before the 13th century.

== Career ==
He matriculated at Broadgates Hall, Oxford on 3 May 1605 aged 18 and was a student of law at the Inner Temple in 1607. He succeeded his father in 1603, inheriting several manors.

In 1621 Trefusis he was elected Member of Parliament for Truro in Cornwall. He was appointed High Sheriff of Cornwall for 1626–27 and Vice-Admiral of North Cornwall from 1645 to his death.

== Marriages and children ==
He married twice:

- Firstly in 1611 to Jane Trefry, the daughter of William Trefry of Place, Fowey, Cornwall, by whom he had 5 sons and 3 daughters, including:
  - John Trefusis (1612–1654), eldest son and heir, who in 1638 married his step-sister Elizabeth Drake. His only son and heir was Francis Trefusis (1650-1680) who in 1672 married Bridget Rolle (1648–1721), the daughter of the wealthy Robert Rolle (c. 1622 – 1660) of Heanton Satchville, Petrockstowe, Devon, by his wife Lady Arabella Clinton, the younger daughter, and in her issue the eventual heiress, of Theophilus Clinton, 4th Earl of Lincoln, 12th Baron Clinton (died 1667). The main connection of the Rolles with the southern part of Cornwall appears to be that in 1601 Robert Rolle (died 1633) of Heanton Satchville, Petrockstowe, Devon (a grandson of George Rolle (died 1552) of Stevenstone, founder of the Rolle family in Devon), purchased the manor of Callington in Cornwall, thereby gaining the pocket borough seat of Callington in Parliament, which in future served to promote the careers of many Rolles and descendants of that family. In 1794 Francis's great-great-grandson Robert George William Trefusis (1764–1797) of Trefusis, the senior representative of the family, successfully claimed the peerage title Baron Clinton following the death in 1791 without children of his grandfather's 3rd cousin George Walpole, 3rd Earl of Orford, 16th Baron Clinton (1730–1791), and thus became the 17th Baron Clinton. Both Walpole and Robert Trefusis were descended from the marriage of Robert Rolle (c. 1622 – 1660) of Heanton Satchville, Petrockstowe, Devon, and Lady Arabella Clinton. His descendant Charles John Robert Hepburn-Stuart-Forbes-Trefusis, 21st Baron Clinton (1863–1957), the last in the senior male line, "held sway over the largest estate Devon had ever seen", mostly former Rolle lands, now managed by Lord Clinton's Clinton Devon Estates company.
- Secondly to Joan Strode, the widow of Sir Francis Drake, 1st Baronet (1588–1637) of Buckland Abbey, Devon, nephew and heir of Admiral Sir Francis Drake (1546–1596), and the 2nd daughter of Sir William Strode (1562–1637), of Newnham, in the parish of Plympton St Mary in Devon, seven times a Member of Parliament for Devon.

== Sources ==
- Hunneyball, Paul, biography of Trefusis, John (c.1586-1647), of Trefusis, Mylor, Cornw. published in History of Parliament: House of Commons 1604-1629, ed. Andrew Thrush and John P. Ferris, 2010
- Vivian, J.L., The Visitations of Cornwall: comprising the Heralds' Visitations of 1530, 1573 & 1620; with additions by J.L. Vivian, Exeter, 1887, pp. 463–8, pedigree of "Trefusis of Trefusis".

Parliament of England
Preceded by Thomas Russell; Thomas Burgess, junior	Member of Parliament for Truro; 1621; With: Barnaby Gough; Sir John Catcher	Succeeded by Richard Daniel; Thomas Burgess
