= Eleanor Palmer (philanthropist) =

Founder of almshouses and charities, d.1558

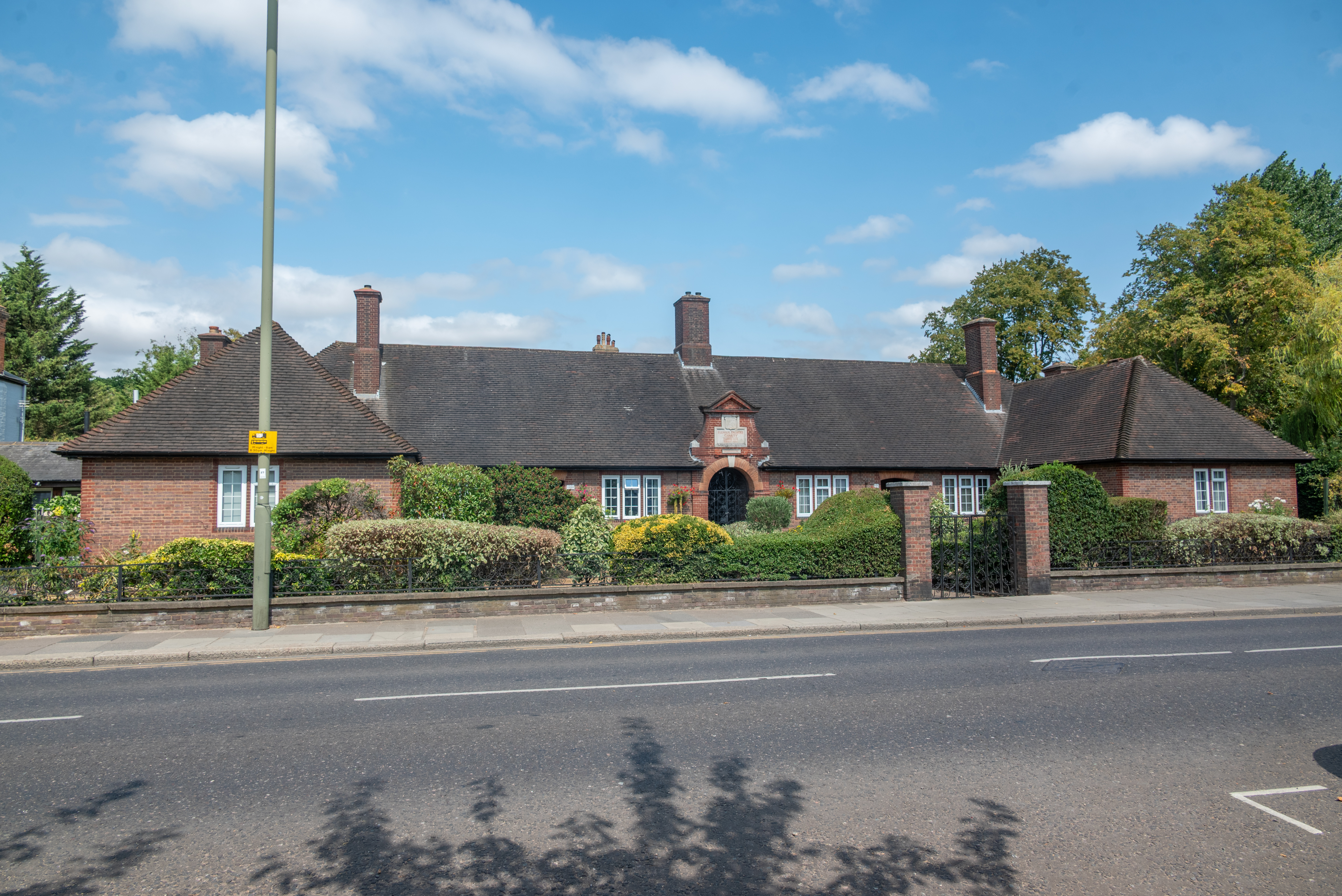
Eleanor Palmer almshouses in Wood Street, Chipping Barnet.

Eleanor Palmer (died 1558) was an English philanthropist who established a charity to help the poor of Chipping Barnet and Kentish Town, now parts of London. Her charity still exists and owns and runs almshouses and residential homes for the elderly.

== Life ==
She was the daughter of Edward Cheeseman (died 1510), a lawyer and administrator who became Cofferer and Keeper of the Wardrobe to King Henry VII, and his wife Joan Lawrence (died 1536). Her brother was Robert Cheeseman (1485-1547), a member of Parliament for Middlesex.

Her first husband was Edward Taylor (died 1509) and her second husband was John Palmer (died 1542), younger son of Richard Palmer and his wife Margery Harthill. He held the manor of Rugmere, which is now the district of Chalk Farm, and she held lands in the manors of Tottenhall and Cantlowes.

She is reported to have had eight children, of which those with John Palmer known to have married are:

Jerome (died 1565), who married Eleanor, daughter of William Paget, 1st Baron Paget. Their daughter and heiress, Mary, was the mother of Edmund Colles.
Sir Christopher, of Shenley, Hertfordshire, who married Elizabeth, daughter of James Barnesdale, and had nine children.
Frances, who married William Bone.
Erasma, who married Francis Shackerley, of Otham in Kent.
Alice (died 1573), who married first Sir William Stanford (died 1558), and secondly Roger Carew, MP for St Albans in 1563.

She died on 29 February 1558, and was buried in St John the Baptist Church, Chipping Barnet.

== Her charity ==
Her memorial plaque in Chipping Barnet church records that she "Dyd geve tow acares of medow ground in Kentishe towne holden of ye prebent of cantelous unto yet use of the poore of this town and of Kentishtowne for ever". (Did give two acres of meadow ground in Kentish Town held from the Prebend of Cantlowes for the use of the poor of this town (that is Chipping Barnet) and of Kentish Town for ever.)

Her charity is today run as two separate funds, the Eleanor Palmer Trust in Chipping Barnet and East Barnet, and The Estate Charity of Eleanor Palmer in Kentish Town. Rents from land owned by the charity support its activities and the trust additionally owns and runs almshouses and residential accommodation for the elderly. In 1999, The Samuel and Rebecca Byford Charity of Chipping Barnet was merged into the Eleanor Palmer Trust.

Eleanor Palmer Primary School in Kentish Town is built on land she gave.
