= Ralph Trenewith =

Ralph Trenewith may refer to:

- Ralph Trenewith (died 1393), MP for Truro
- Ralph Trenewith (died 1427), MP for Liskeard

== See also ==
- Trenewith (surname)
