= Duppa =

Duppa may refer to:

- Brian Duppa (1588–1662), English bishop
- Phillip Darrell Duppa (1832–1892), pioneer in the settlement of Arizona, USA
- Richard Duppa (1770–1831), English writer and draughtsman
- Thomas Duppa (fl. 1554), English member of parliament
- Jack Duppa-Miller (1903–1994), Royal Navy officer who was awarded the George Cross
- Vic Duppa-Whyte (1934–1986), British paper engineer and author
