= HMS Antelope (1802) =

Royal Navy ship

HMS Antelope was a ship of the line in the Royal Navy launched in 1802 during the Napoleonic Wars.

== Service history ==
She was designed by Sir John Henslow and built by Nicholas Diddams at Sheerness Dockyard. Her keel was laid in June 1790, but she took many years to complete, and was not launched until 10 November 1802. She had a nominal 50 guns and a huge crew of 350 men.

Her first commander was Captain John Melhuish. Her first action was the blockade of Ostend in 1803.

In May 1804 she was the lead ship in an unsuccessful four-day attack on the French fleet under Ver Huell.

On 8 December 1804, she made an unsuccessful attack on Fort Rouge, protecting Calais harbour.

In June 1805, she sailed for the East Indies and on her return in 1807 spent some time at the Cape of Good Hope. She spent most of 1808 in the Mediterranean and in June 1809 sailed over the Atlantic to serve off the Newfoundland coast, staying there until the very end of 1810 when she then escorted a trans-Atlantic convoy to Gibraltar, returning to Newfoundland in June 1812.

On 21 December 1812, Admiral Butcher took command and began a period of intense action. Butcher was charged with protecting English shipping in the Great Belt, and was particularly successful in capturing the enemy's gun-boats and privateers. For example:

- On 6, 25 and 30 October 1813, Antelope captured and destroyed the Danish armed rowboats Buonaparte, Nye, Prove, Fera Venner, No.25, and Morgan Stierner.
- On 23 October 1813 Bruizer and Antelope recaptured the Alida.
- On 24 October 1813 Antelope and Bruizer captured the Danish privateer Eleonora.

On 1 March 1814, Butcher and HMS Antelope joined the fleet of Admiral William Young off the mouth of the Eastern Scheldt in the Netherlands. Antelope was sent with two other ships to reinforce the squadron of frigates in the Western Scheldt, but owing to the illness of one pilot and the desertion of the other, Antelope ran aground off Flushing. For 48 hours she lay exposed to continuous barrage of shells from enemy batteries on shore, but was (to the astonishment of the whole fleet) eventually able to free herself and escape.

In November 1814, she began an upgrade refit at Portsmouth Dockyard, partly repairing damage sustained at the Scheldt and partly as a cosmetic upgrade to serve as the official flagship for Admiral Butcher. The refit took 13 months but, beyond a single voyage to Quebec, Butcher made little use of the ship after 22 December 1815. She was officially paid off in April 1819 and languished several years moored off the Thames Estuary before undergoing conversion to a prison ship from August to November 1823 at Chatham Docks. The ship remained seaworthy (unlike most of the "prison hulks" of the period). Her last main recorded task is transportation of prisoners to Bermuda in January 1824. As the ship was no longer in Royal Navy possession records then disappear.

It would appear that she remained moored off the coast of Bermuda from 1824 until July 1845 when she was broken up.

== Notable officers ==
Through a mixture of coincidence and providence a long list of illustrious officers commanded or served on the Antelope:

- Septimus Arabin midshipman on Antelope 1802 to 1806
- Captain John Melhuish
- Captain Home Riggs Popham
- Captain Robert Plampin
- Captain Henry Bazely
- Captain Barrington Dacres
- Captain Edward Galway
- Captain Edward Hawker
- Captain Samuel Butcher
- Captain Richard Booth Bowden
- Captain George Sayer
- Commodore William Sidney Smith
- Rear Admiral William Domett
- Vice Admiral John Holloway
- Vice Admiral John Thomas Duckworth
- Vice Admiral Sir Edmund Nagle
- Rear Admiral John Harvey
