= 1868 Truro by-election =

UK parliamentary by-election

The 1868 Truro by-election was held on 21 December 1868. The by-election was held due to the incumbent Liberal MP, John Cranch Walker Vivian, becoming Lord Commissioner of the Treasury. It was won by Vivian who was unopposed.
