= Thomas Duppa =

16th-century English politician

Thomas Duppa was an English politician. He was a Member of Parliament for Truro, Cornwall in 1554 as the second member to William Iseham. This was under the reign of Queen Mary when parliament met at Oxford.
