= Nicholas Randall =

English politician (1519–c.1562)

Nicholas Randall (by 1519 – c. 1562) was an English politician who sat in six parliaments in the reigns of Edward VI and Mary I between 1547 and 1559.

== Biography ==
Randall was a yeoman of Truro, Cornwall and in 1540 obtained a 21-year lease on the lands in Truro previously belonging to the Black Friars. He was constable of Trematon Castle and havener of the Duchy of Cornwall from 1542 and bailiff of Aylewarton (Alverton) and Penzance from 1543. In 1546 he obtained a lease on the manor of Tybesta in Creed.

Randall was Member of Parliament for Truro in 1547. He sat again in two sessions in 1553 with Thomas Roydon and then with John Methnes. He became comptroller and collector of customs for the Duchy of Cornwall in 1554/5. In 1555 he was MP for Truro with Thomas Randall, in 1558 with Thomas Royson and again in 1559.

Randall died in the year up to May 1562. His wife was probably named Alice.
