= Power baronets of Kilfane (1836) =

Escutcheon of the Power baronets of Kilfane

The Power baronetcy, of Kilfane in the County of Kilkenny, was created in the Baronetage of the United Kingdom on 15 July 1836 for John Power. The title became dormant on the death of George Power, the 7th Baronet, in 1928. As of 2026, it appears as dormant on the Official Roll.

== Power baronets, of Kilfane (1836) ==
- Sir John Power, 1st Baronet (died 1844)
- Sir John Power, 2nd Baronet (1798–1873)
- Sir Richard Crampton Power, 3rd Baronet (1843–1892)
- Sir John Elliott Cecil Power, 4th Baronet (1870–1900)
- Sir Elliott Derrick le Poer Power, 5th Baronet (1872–1902)
- Sir Adam Clayton Power, 6th Baronet (1844–1903)
- Sir George Power, 7th Baronet (1846–1928). As a young singer, he created the leading tenor role in H.M.S. Pinafore.

== Notes ==
Baronetage of the United Kingdom
Preceded by Graves-Sawle baronets	Power baronets of Kilfane; 15 July 1836	Succeeded by Workman-Macnaghten baronets
