= Graves-Sawle baronets =

Extinct baronetcy in the Baronetage of the United Kingdom

The Graves-Sawle baronetcy, of Penrice in the County of Cornwall and of Barley in the County of Devon, was a title in the Baronetage of the United Kingdom. It was created on 22 March 1836 for Joseph Graves-Sawle. Born Joseph Graves, he had assumed by Royal licence the surname of Sawle in 1815, it being the surname of his maternal grandfather. Then in 1827 he resumed by Royal licence the surname of Graves, in addition to that of Sawle.

The second Baronet sat as Member of Parliament for Bodmin. The title became extinct on the death of the fourth Baronet in 1932.

== Graves-Sawle baronets, of Penrice and Barley (1836) ==
- Sir Joseph Sawle Graves-Sawle, 1st Baronet (1793–1865)
- Sir Charles Graves-Sawle, 2nd Baronet (1816–1903)
- Sir Francis Aylmer Graves-Sawle, 3rd Baronet (1849–1903)
- Rear-Admiral Sir Charles John Graves-Sawle, 4th Baronet (1851–1932)

Coat of arms of Graves-Sawle of Penrice and Barley
Crest An eagle displayed Or, supporting in the dexter claw a staff erect Proper, thereon hoisted a pendant, forked and flowing to the sinister Gules, with the inscription 'Per sinum Codanean' (Through the Codanean bay) in letters of Gold. Escutcheon Quarterly, 1st and 4th: Azure, three falcons’ heads erased two and one within a bordure Or (Sawle); 2nd and 3rd: Gules, an eagle displayed, in chief a naval crown between two bombs Or, fired Proper (Graves).

Baronetage of the United Kingdom
Preceded by Rowley baronets	Graves-Sawle baronets of Penrice and Barley; 22 March 1836	Succeeded by Power baronets
