= Sarah Brydges Willyams =

English supporter and confidante of Benjamin Disraeli

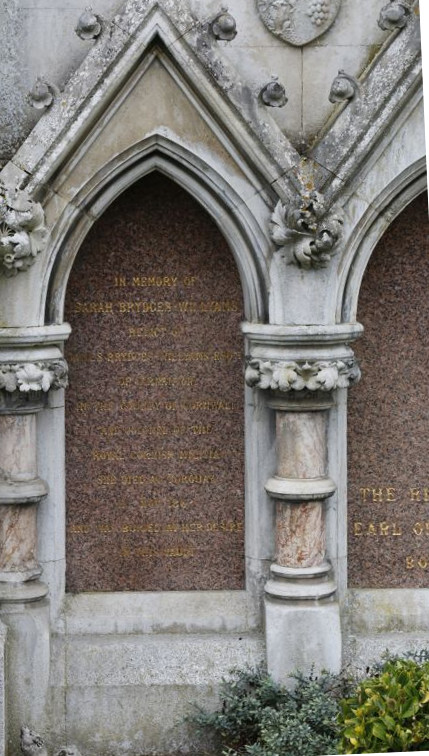
Willyams was buried besides the novelist and Prime Minister Disraeli

Sarah Brydges Willyams, born Sarah Mendez da Costa (born before 1783 – 11 November 1863), was an English supporter and confidante of Benjamin Disraeli.

== Early life ==
Sarah Mendez da Costa was the daughter of Abraham Mendez da Costa (died 1782) and his wife Elizabeth Leigh. Sarah's grandfather, Daniel Mendez da Costa, was a Sephardic Jewish merchant in Jamaica. She married Col. James Brydges Williams, commander of the Cornish militia. His nephew was Edward Brydges Willyams, a Member of Parliament and sheriff of Cornwall.

== Adulthood ==
Sarah Brydges Willyams was widowed in 1820. In 1851, Mrs. Brydges Willyams was an elderly widow without children, living in Mount Braddon, Torquay. That year, she wrote to Benjamin Disraeli, asking if he would consent to be the beneficiary of her will. She had long admired him as a representative of Jewish people in England. He agreed, and in the next twelve years they corresponded regularly, about their lives and the books they were reading, and about their shared heritage: "I, like you, was not bred among my race, and was nurtured in great prejudice against them," he confessed in 1853, confident in her sympathy. Disraeli and his wife first visited Mrs. Willyams at Torquay in August 1853, and yearly thereafter until her death. They exchanged not only letters, but flowers, plant cuttings, newspapers, venison, fish, birds, and even lobster.

Charlotte von Rothschild gave an exaggerated and unflattering description of Mrs. Willyams in 1862, as "quite a miser, starves herself into a skeleton...keeps neither horses, nor carriages, nor men servants – only an enormous watchdog to protect her and her gold."

When Sarah Brydges Willyams died in 1863, she left £30,000 to Disraeli, and her remains were buried at the church of St Michael and All Angels near Disraeli's Buckinghamshire home, Hughenden Manor. "I have lost a kind and faithful friend," Disraeli wrote on the occasion, "but I have lost her in the fulness of years, and she has made me the heir to her not inconsiderable fortune."

== Legacy ==
The Roxburghe Club published the correspondence between Disraeli and Brydges Willyams as a limited-edition volume in 2006. Mrs. Brydges Willyams's 1827 villa at Mt. Braddon still stands as a private residence; it housed a restaurant called "Disraeli's" in the 1980s.
