= Edmund Turner =

English Liberal politician

Edmund Turner (29 January 1792 – December 1848) was an English Liberal Party politician.

He was elected at the 1837 general election as Member of Parliament (MP) for Truro in Cornwall, and held the seat until his death in 1849, aged 56.

Parliament of the United Kingdom
Preceded by William Tooke; John Ennis Vivian	Member of Parliament for Truro; 1837 – 1849; With: John Ennis Vivian	Succeeded by Humphrey Willyams; John Ennis Vivian
