= John Melhuish =

16th-century English politician

John Melhuish was an English merchant and politician. He was a Member of Parliament for Truro, Cornwall 1554 to 1555.

== Biography ==
John Melhuish was a tin merchant from Truro. After a municipal career as a Mayor of Truro he was elected to Parliament along with Nicholas Randall. In 1553 they aligned with Queen Mary and voted against the Protestant opposition to the Crown. In 1554 Melhuish abandoned Parliament without a licence and evaded summons to the King's Bench. For three years in a row, 1555 to end of 1557, he was fined for contempt of court in absentia. Officers of the Duchy of Cornwall pressed their own charges against Melhuish. Bankrupted, he fled his home town and sought protection from his creditors, which was granted by the Crown in 1558. He settled near Buckfastleigh in Devon, styled himself "late of Truro" and retired from politics.
