= Humphrey Willyams =

British Whig politician

Member of Parliament for Truro
- In office 11 January 1849 – 8 July 1852 Serving with John Ennis Vivian
- Preceded by: John Ennis Vivian; Edmund Turner
- Succeeded by: John Ennis Vivian; Henry Vivian

Personal details
- Born: 1792
- Died: 7 May 1872 (aged 79–80)
- Party: Whig

Humphrey Willyams (1792 – 7 May 1872) was a British Whig politician.

Willyams was elected a Whig Member of Parliament for Truro at a by-election in 1849—caused by the death of Edmund Turner—and held the seat until 1852 when he did not seek re-election.

Parliament of the United Kingdom
Preceded by John Ennis Vivian; Edmund Turner	Member of Parliament for Truro; 1849–1852; With: John Ennis Vivian	Succeeded by John Ennis Vivian; Henry Vivian
