= Charles Graves-Sawle =

Member of the British House of Commons

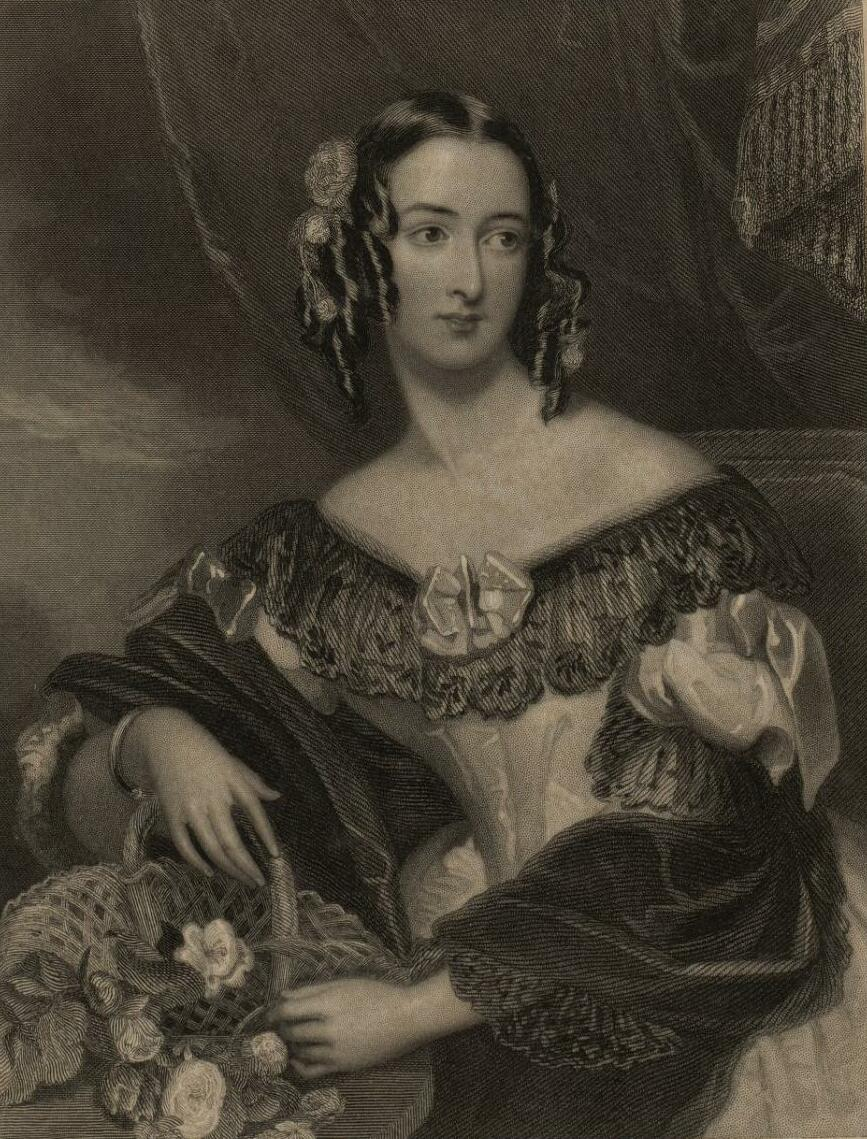
Graves-Sawle's wife Rose, painted before their marriage by William Fisher

Sir Charles Brune Graves-Sawle, 2nd Baronet (10 October 1816 – 20 April 1903) was a baronet and a member of the British House of Commons representing Bodmin.

Graves-Sawle was the son of Joseph Sawle Graves-Sawle who had been created Baronet Graves-Sawle of Penrice in 1836. He was MP for Bodmin from 1852 to 1857. He inherited the baronetcy on the death of his father in 1865. He was also a Justice of the Peace, Special Deputy Warden of the Stannaries and Honorary Lieutenant Colonel of the Royal Cornwall and Devon Miners' Militia.

In 1846 Graves-Sawle married Rose Paynter (1818–1914), the friend and inspiration of the poet Walter Savage Landor. He wrote many poems dedicated to her. They lived in Penrice, near St Austell, Cornwall, and at 39 Eaton Place, St George Hanover Square, London. Their sons Francis (1849–1903), a colonel in the Coldstream Guards, and Charles (1851–1932) who became a rear-admiral, successively succeeded to the baronetcy. The couple had two daughters, Rose Dorothea (1847–1901) and Constance (1859–1942).

Parliament of the United Kingdom
Preceded by James Wyld; Henry Charles Lacy	Member of Parliament for Bodmin; 1852–1857; With: William Michell	Succeeded by John Vivian; James Wyld
Baronetage of the United Kingdom
Preceded by Joseph Graves-Sawle	Baronet (of Penrice and Barley); 1865–1903	Succeeded by Francis Graves-Sawle
