= Augustus Smith (politician) =

Lord Proprietor of the Isles of Scilly from 1834 to 1872

Augustus Smith MP
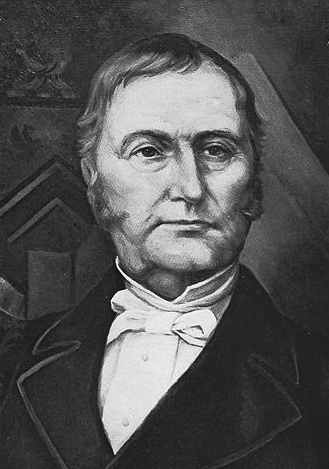

Lord Proprietor of the Isles of Scilly
- In office 20 November 1834 – 31 July 1872
- Preceded by: Office established George Osborne, 6th Duke of Leeds (as Governor of Scilly)
- Succeeded by: Thomas Smith-Dorrien-Smith

Personal details
- Born: Augustus John Smith; 15 September 1804 Harley Street, London
- Died: 31 July 1872 (aged 67) Plymouth, Devon
- Resting place: St Buryan, Cornwall
- Party: Liberal Party
- Relations: Thomas Smith-Dorrien-Smith (nephew); Robert Smith-Dorrien (brother); Horace Smith-Dorrien (nephew)
- Occupation: Politician, philanthropist

Member of Parliament for Truro
- In office 1857–1865
- Preceded by: John Ennis Vivian and Henry Vivian
- Succeeded by: John Vivian and Frederick Williams

Augustus John Smith (15 September 1804 – 31 July 1872) was a British politician and philanthropist who served as Lord Proprietor of the Isles of Scilly for over thirty years from 1834 until his death in 1872, as well as serving as Member of Parliament for Truro from 1857 to 1865. As Lord Proprietor of the Isles of Scilly, he introduced numerous reforms to the islands, including improvements to education, tenancy structures and employment. He built his home on the island of Tresco, and started the Tresco Abbey Gardens. He was succeeded as Lord Proprietor by his nephew, Thomas Smith-Dorrien, after his death in 1872.

== Early life and career ==
Augustus Smith was born in September 1804 "at the house of a fashionable accoucheur in Harley Street", London, to James Smith and Mary Isabella Pechell. He was raised in the family home of Ashlyns Hall in Berkhamsted, Hertfordshire, England. In 1810, when Smith was six years old, his older half-brother James died after he fell from his pony. Following this, Smith's mother died while she was on a trip in Paris when Smith was leaving Harrow. Smith was educated at Harrow School and Oxford University. While at Oxford, Smith was influenced by the utilitarian ideas of Jeremy Bentham. Influenced by these ideas, Smith concluded that the best way to improve the standard of living of the poor was to improve the standard of education. Having come to this conclusion, Smith went about attempting to improve the local Berkhamstead Grammar School, while also establishing non-conformist and non-denominational parish schools in his local area using his own funds, becoming known locally as a philanthropist.

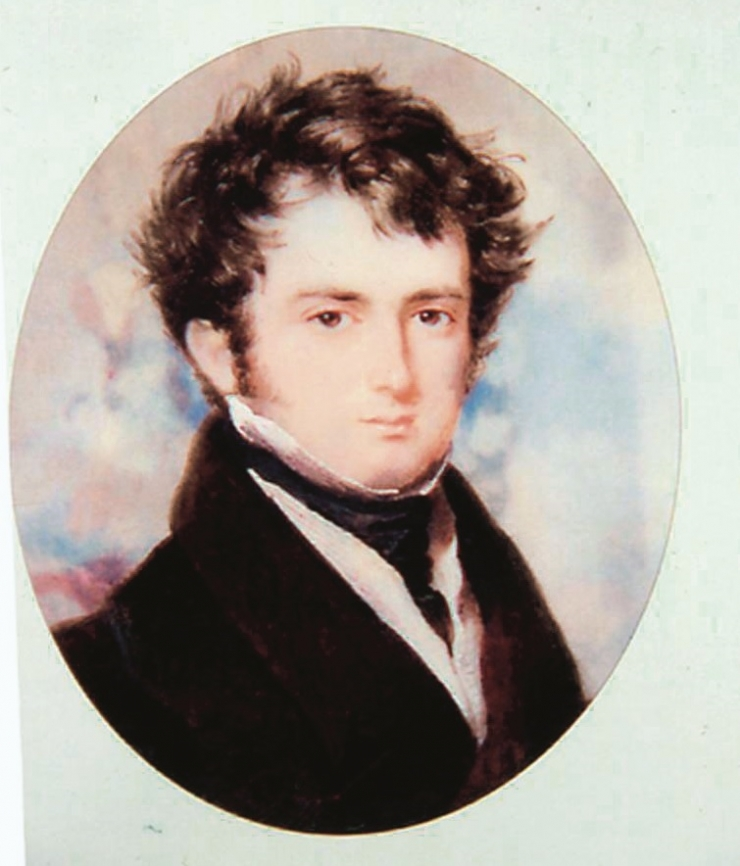
Augustus Smith a year or so after his 21st birthday.

Smith first heard of the then-poverty stricken Isles of Scilly by 1831, and began initial negotiations about taking on the lease for the Islands with the Duchy of Cornwall, who owned the freehold for the Islands. However, a claim to the Islands was put forward by the Commissioner of Woods and Forests, which led to Smith withdrawing his bid, wanting to avoid any bureaucratic conflict. Smith instead went to Ireland to start to negotiate a lease for the Arran Islands in 1833, however, these negotiations never came to fruition, due to Smith being put off by the tenancy systems of runrig. Smith then returned to his home, continuing his campaign of educational reform in Berkhamstead.

== Lord Proprietor of the Isles of Scilly ==
In 1834, Smith was informed by the Duchy of Cornwall that they had won a lawsuit against the Commissioner of Woods and Forests, and that the Isles of Scilly were again available for lease. At this time, the Islands were administrated by a body known as the Council of Twelve, who derived their authority from the Duke of Leeds. The 6th Duke, George Osborne, had since given up the lease to the Islands, so the Council lacked its claimed authority. Due to this, as well as the lack of magistrates due to the absence of any local property owners, the Islands had become increasingly lawless. Moreover, due to the then-popular local practice of parents dividing their land between all of their children, farm holdings had become increasingly smaller and confusing, with many of the individual holdings being too small to sustain those who occupied them.

Smith signed a 99-year lease for the Islands for £20,000 (equivalent to £2,000,000 in 2025) on 20 November 1834, and became the Lord Proprietor of the Isles of Scilly, having visited the islands himself to assess them. In return, Smith was to pay a £40 a year rent to the Duchy, as well as spend £5,000 on building a new church and quay for St Mary's. He was also to be responsible for selecting and employing the Island's teachers and clergy. Smith gave himself the title of Lord Proprietor when he took on the lease for the islands.

In March 1835, Smith, along with five others, became Magistrates for the Islands. Smith did not allow any clergy members onto the magistrates bench, due to their perceived "propensity for causing trouble". Smith employed W.T. Johns as his agent.

After becoming the Lord Proprietor, Smith began to introduce numerous Benthamist reforms to the Isles of Scilly. Smith's proposed reforms were included in four main points. Firstly, he wanted all local children to have an education. Secondly, he would consolidate all the local farms to form larger, more sustainable holdings. Thirdly, he would eliminate the common practice of smuggling by providing better employment to all. Fourthly, he would encourage tenants an incentive to improve their holdings by giving them security of tenure. These reforms were very unpopular with the local population. Smith's consolidation of all the smaller holdings necessitated the eviction of many tenants, while his other reforms regarding smuggling and education were met with much scorn from the local residents.

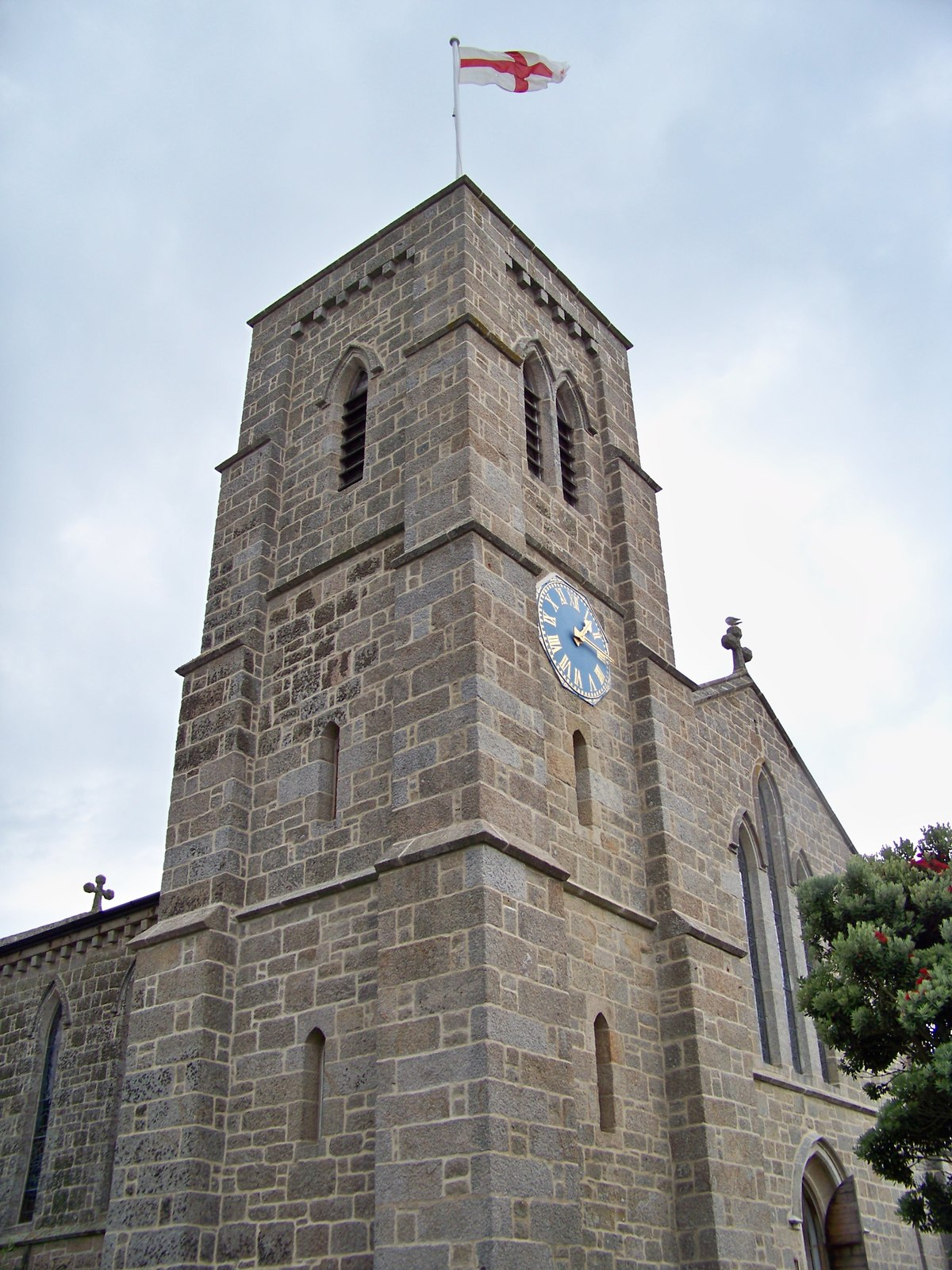
St Mary's Church, St Mary's, which Smith designed and built

By 1836, Smith had completed the first stage of his new residence on Scilly, Tresco Abbey. Smith did not build his residence on St Mary's as many expected, instead building it on Tresco, on a ridge which had a view over all the Isles of Scilly. During the late 1830s, Smith was also able to complete construction on both the new church on St Mary's and the new quay.

In 1840, after the missionary organization Society for Promoting Christian Knowledge, who had been the primary providers of education, left the Islands, Smith took responsibility for providing education and schools. He allegedly introduced a one penny charge for attending school, but a two penny fine for those who did not attend, effectively introducing compulsory education to the Islands thirty years before it was introduced on the mainland; however, there is no evidence for this claim. Regardless, Smith had much success in promoting education on the islands, with both adults and children attending school.

During the 1850s, Smith started an Ostrich farm, and exported the feathers to London for use in feathered hats.

In 1855, Smith depopulated the island of Samson. He then started a deer park on the island, but they escaped their enclosure and traveled to the less barren Tresco. Following this, he introduced black rabbits to the island.

== Public offices ==
In 1857, after Smith's friend Charles Lemon retired, Smith was encouraged by Lemon to stand as a candidate for Truro in the 1857 General Election. He was elected as a Liberal MP during that election. He was re-elected as MP in the 1864 election, and resigned as MP in May 1865.

As well as being an MP, Smith served as president of the Royal Geological Society of Cornwall from 1857 to 1862, and also of the Royal Institution of Cornwall. A freemason since he came of age, Smith served as the Provincial Grandmaster for Cornwall from 1863.

== Other ventures ==
=== Stemmata Smithiana-Ferraria ===
In 1861, Smith published A True and Faithful History of the Family of Smith, Originally Cradled at Wiverton and Cropwell-Butler, in the Parish of Titheby, and more recently established at Nottingham, in the County of Nottingham. As the title suggests, it traces the family name from its early beginnings and asserts that ″the county of Nottingham may justly be considered as the fatherland of Smiths, who have always abounded within its borders″.

=== Berkhamsted Common ===
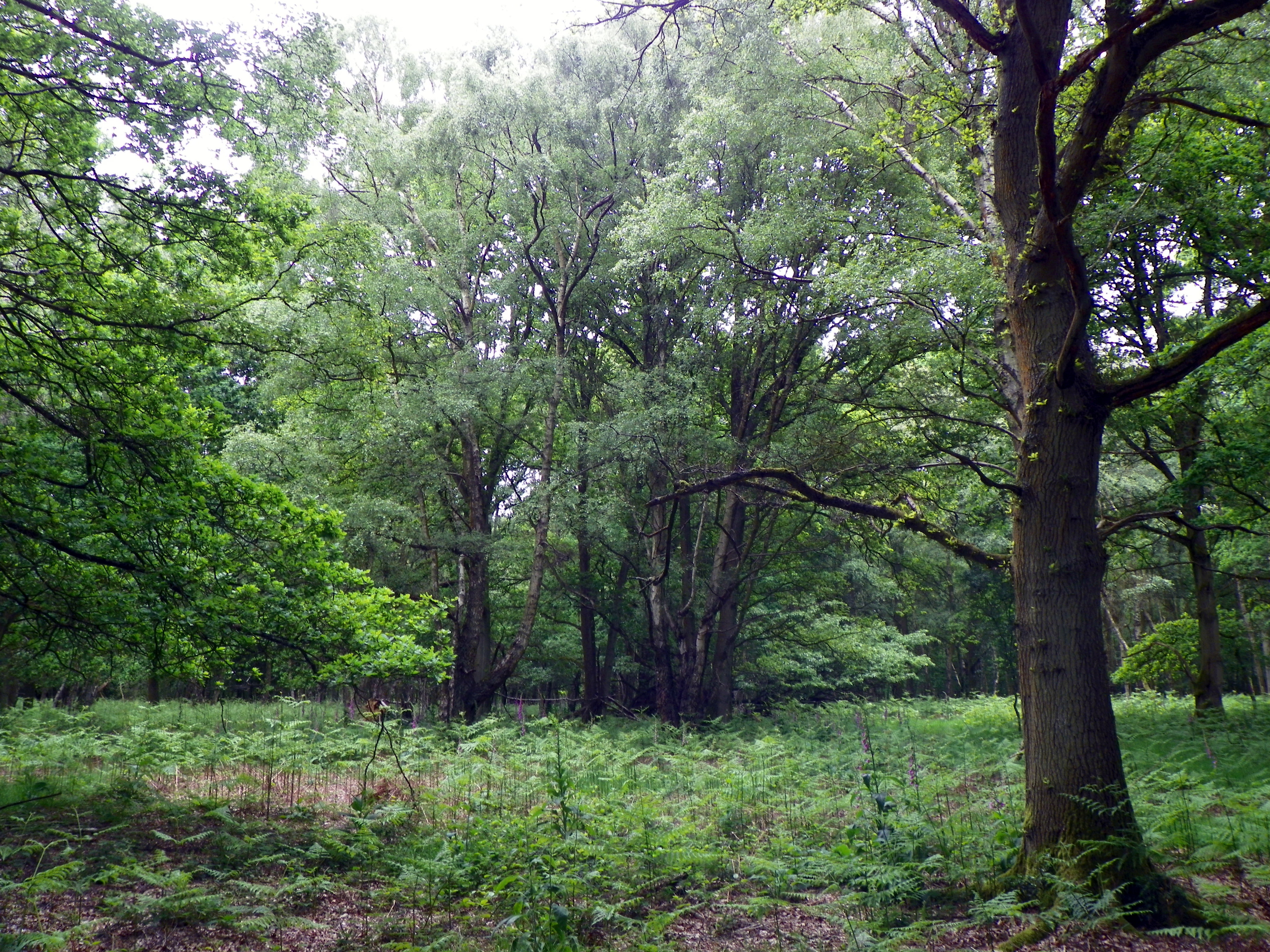
Berkhamstead common in 2016

In 1866 Earl Brownlow tried to enclose Berkhamsted Common with 5' steel fences built by Woods of Berkhamsted and therefore, claim it as part of his estate. Smith brought out a gang of navvies on a specially chartered train to roll up the fence and leave it within sight of Brownlow's house, demonstrating his will to protect Berkhamsted Common for the people of Berkhamsted.

== Personal life ==
Smith lived at his house Tresco Abbey and started what would become the Tresco Abbey Gardens.

Smith never married, but had illegitimate children by many women, including Mary Pender, a local woman with whom he had at least three children, two of which, Georgina and Laurence, Smith continued to support "in great comfort". He had a close relationship and a lifelong correspondence with Lady Sophia Tower, a married woman (and only daughter of the 1st Earl Brownlow) who often visited him at Tresco. The estate was inherited by his nephew Thomas Smith-Dorrien-Smith, and his descendants retain the lease of Tresco to the present day.

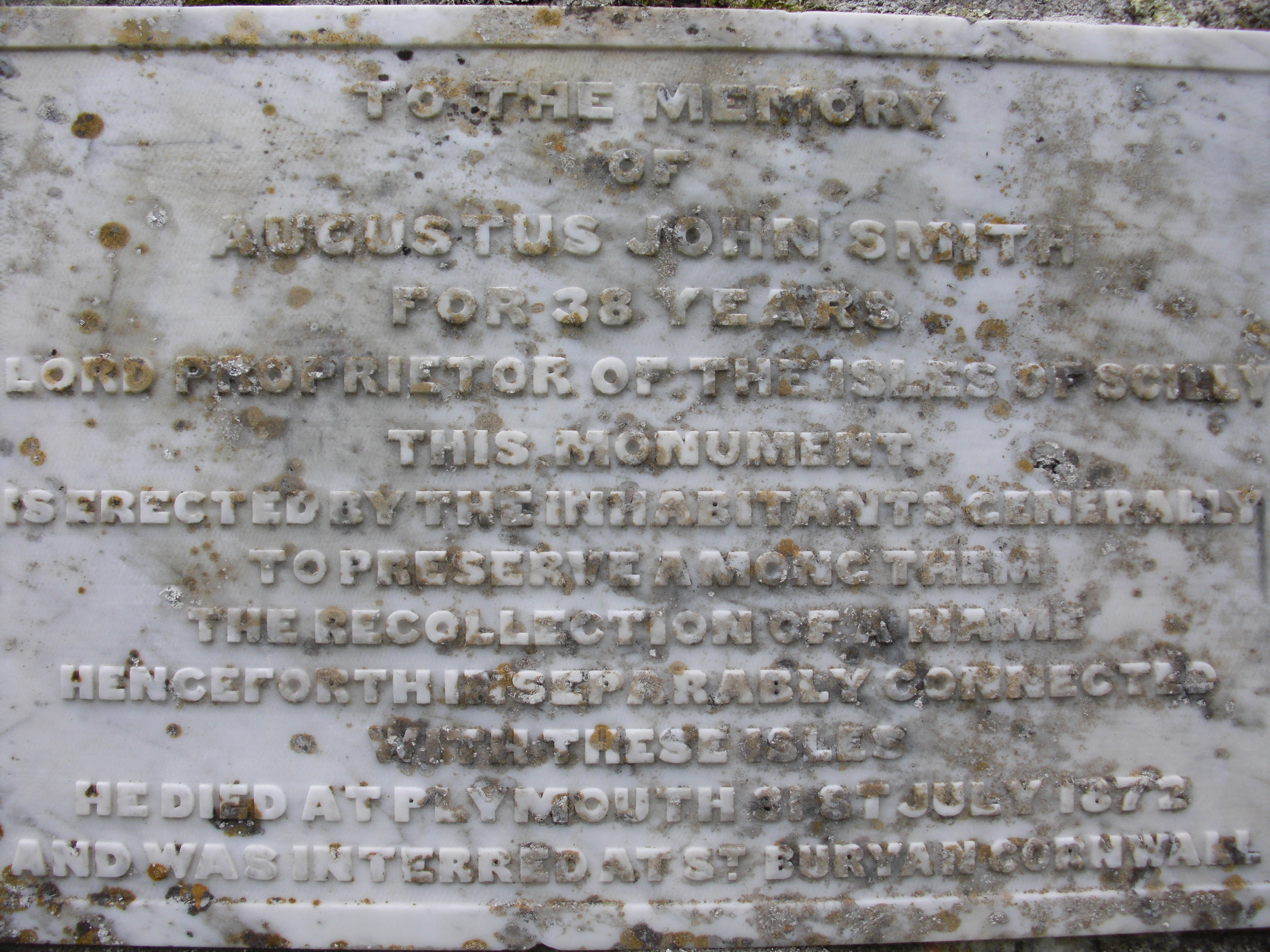
The plaque on the front of a monument to Smith, located in the churchyard of St Mary's Old Church, St Mary's, Isles of Scilly. Click to enlarge.

=== Death ===
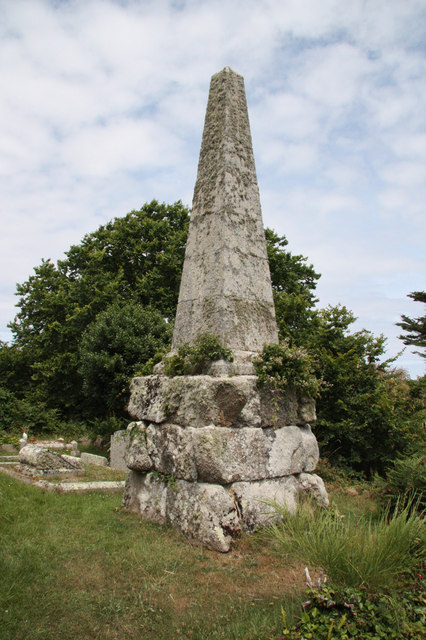
The memorial to Augustus Smith at St Mary's Old Church.

Smith died of gangrene of the lungs at the Duke of Cornwall Hotel, Plymouth on 31 July 1872. Four days before he died he asked to be buried in St Buryan's Church, St Buryan, Cornwall, instead of in the churchyard of St Mary's Old Church, on Duchy land, because the Duchy was “greedy and grabbing”. A tall stone monument was erected in the churchyard of St Mary's Old Church, St Mary's, Isles of Scilly to recognise Smith's involvement with the Islands, as well as a monument on Tresco.

Preceded by Office established	Lord Proprietor of the Isles of Scilly; 1838−1872	Succeeded by Thomas Dorrien-Smith
Parliament of the United Kingdom
Preceded by John Ennis Vivian and Sir Henry Vivian	Member of Parliament for Truro; 1857–1865; With: Edward Brydges Willyams, to 1859; Montague Edward Smith, 1859–1863; Sir Frederick Martin Williams, from 1853	Succeeded by John Cranch Walker and Sir Frederick Martin Williams
