= William Tooke (1777–1863) =

English lawyer and politician

William Tooke FRS (1777–1863) was an English lawyer, politician, and President of the Society of Arts.

== Early life and the law ==
He was the younger son of William Tooke the historian; Thomas Tooke was his elder brother. Born at St. Petersburg on 22 November 1777, he came to England in 1792, and was articled to William Devon, solicitor, in Gray's Inn, with whom he entered into partnership in 1798. Subsequently, he was for many years at 39 Bedford Row, in partnership with Charles Parker, and then in the firm of Tooke, Son, & Hallowes.

In 1825 Tooke took a prominent part in the formation of the St. Katharine's Docks, and was the London agent of George Barker, the solicitor of the London and Birmingham Railway.

== Voluntary work ==
He participated in the foundation of London University in Gower Street. He was one of its first council members (19 December 1823), and continued as treasurer until March 1841. He worked for the charter for the Royal Society of Literature on a pro bono basis. He was an active member of the council of the society, and one of the main promoters of Thomas Wright's Biographia Britannica Literaria. In 1826, with Lord Brougham, George Birkbeck, George Grote, and others, he took part in the formation of the Society for the Diffusion of Useful Knowledge; but in 1846 he was one of those who disapproved of the publication of the Society's Biographical Dictionary.

Tooke was elected a Fellow of the Royal Society on 12 March 1818. He was present at the first annual meeting of the Law Institution on 5 June 1827, and was instrumental in obtaining a royal charter of incorporation for it in January 1832. From an earlier period he was a leading member of the Society of Arts; in 1814 he was the chairman of the committee of correspondence and editor of the Transactions, and in 1862 he was elected president of the society. For services to the Institution of Civil Engineers he was elected an honorary member. From 1824 he was honorary secretary and from 1840 one of the three treasurers of the Royal Literary Fund Society.

== In politics ==
At the general election of 1830, with his friend Sir John William Lubbock, Tooke unsuccessfully contested the close borough of Truro. After Reform Act 1832, he on 15 December 1832 was elected, and represented the borough until July 1837. He was afterwards a candidate for Finsbury, but did not proceed to a poll, and on 30 June 1841 he unsuccessfully contested Reading.

During the five sessions that he sat in parliament Tooke supported reform, and gave his vote for measures for the promotion of education and for the abolition of slavery; but in later life his views became more conservative.

== Death ==
Tooke died at 12 Russell Square, London, on 20 September 1863, and was buried in Kensal Green Cemetery. His portrait was painted by J. White for the board-room of the governors and directors of the poor of the parishes of St. Andrew, Holborn, and St. George's, Bloomsbury, and engraved in mezzotint by Charles Turner.

== Works ==
In 1804 Tooke published anonymously, in two volumes, the Poetical Works of Charles Churchill; republished in three volumes in 1844 under his own name in William Pickering's Aldine Poets, and reprinted in two volumes in 1892. In 1855 he compiled The Monarchy of France, its Rise, Progress, and Fall, in two volumes.

Tooke printed privately verses written by himself and some of his friends, under the title of Verses edited by M.M.M. (1860). These initials represented his family motto, Militia Mea Multiplex. He also wrote a pamphlet, signed W. T., entitled University of London: Statement of Facts as to Charter, 1835. He was a contributor to the New Monthly Magazine, the Annual Register, and the Gentleman's Magazine.

== Family ==
In 1807 Tooke married Amelia (died 1848), youngest daughter of Samuel Shaen of Crix, Essex. By her he left a son, Arthur William Tooke of Pinner, Middlesex, and two daughters.

== Notes ==
Attribution

This article incorporates text from a publication now in the public domain: "Tooke, William (1777-1863)". Dictionary of National Biography. London: Smith, Elder & Co. 1885–1900.

Parliament of the United Kingdom
Preceded by Nathaniel William Peach; Viscount Encombe	Member of Parliament for Truro; 1832 – 1837; With: Sir Hussey Vivian 1832–35; John Ennis Vivian from 1835	Succeeded by John Ennis Vivian; Edmund Turner
