= Robert Clerk (MP) =

English Member of Parliament

Robert Clerk was a Member of Parliament for Truro in 1386. There is no other information recorded of them.
