= Montague Edward Smith =

British politician and judge (1806–1891)

The Right Honourable Sir Montague Edward Smith

Justice of the Common Pleas
- In office 7 February 1865 – 3 November 1871
- Preceded by: Sir Edward Vaughan Williams
- Succeeded by: Robert Collier

Personal details
- Born: 25 December 1806 Bideford, Devon
- Died: 3 May 1891 (aged 84) Park Lane, London
- Party: Conservative
- Profession: barrister, judge

Sir Montague Edward Smith (25 December 1806 – 3 May 1891) was a British barrister and judge who served as one of the last Justices of the Court of Common Pleas.

== Early life ==
Smith was born Edward Montague Smith on 25 December 1806, to Thomas Smith, an attorney, and Margaret Colville. As an adult he reversed the order of his Christian and middle names, and was known as Montague. Following an education at Bideford Grammar School, Smith was articled to his father in 1823, practising on his own after his father died five years later.

== Career ==
On 1 November 1830 he joined Gray's Inn, where he was called to the Bar on 18 November 1835. Practising on the Western circuit, which had recently seen its best barristers appointed to judicial posts, Smith quickly built up a large practice. On 11 May 1839 he transferred to the Middle Temple, where he became a Bencher on 22 November 1853 and Treasurer in 1863. On 28 June 1853 he was made a Queen's Counsel (QC).

At the 1859 general election, Smith was returned as a Conservative Member of Parliament for Truro. He spoke little within Parliament, but did succeed in passing an Act to limit crown suits in 1861. On 7 February 1865 he was made a Justice of the Court of Common Pleas, hearing cases such as Readhead v Midland Railway Company, and Rylands v Fletcher. A physical defect made travelling difficult, limiting his effectiveness as a judge of the normal Westminster courts. On 3 November 1871, he moved from the Court of Common Pleas to the Judicial Committee of the Privy Council, and was temporarily replaced by Robert Collier, allowing Collier to also qualify to join the Committee. He retired on 12 December 1881 and died at his home in Park Lane, London, on 3 May 1891. He is buried at Kensal Green Cemetery, London.

== Arms ==
Coat of arms of Montague Edward Smith

Crest
A Cornish chough as in the arms.
Escutcheon
Quarterly 1st & 4th Argent a fess dancettée between three roses two in chief and one in base Gules 2nd & 3rd Gules on a fess embattled Or three Cornish choughs Sable.
Motto
Spero

Parliament of the United Kingdom
Preceded by Edward Brydges Willyams and Augustus Smith	Member of Parliament for Truro; 1859–1865; With: Augustus Smith	Succeeded by Sir Frederick Williams and Augustus Smith
