= 1871 Truro by-election =

UK parliamentary by-election

The 1871 Truro by-election was held on 13 September 1871. The by-election was fought when the incumbent Liberal MP, John Cranch Walker Vivian, resigned to become Permanent Under-Secretary of State for War. It was won by the Conservative candidate James McGarel-Hogg. The Conservatives retained their gain at the 1874 UK general election.
