= William Michell =

English physician and politician

William Michell (14 February 1796 – 4 November 1872) was a British physician and Member of Parliament.

The son of Bennet Michell, he was born in Bodmin in 1796. He wrote a paper on the use of ergot in childbirth in 1828; that year he was also admitted to Emmanuel College, Cambridge, receiving an MB in 1834, and an MD in 1839. Michell was admitted an MRCS in 1843. He was elected an MP for Bodmin in 1852.

In 1859, faced with a petition against him by James Wyld for corrupt practices during the elections, he agreed not to defend his seat if Wyld would withdraw the petition. Attacked by John Arthur Roebuck, who saw in this an attempt to escape charges, Michell replied that his means were insufficient to sustain the expenses necessary to defend himself against the petition. Roebuck's motion to prevent him from resigning was defeated, and he left Parliament by becoming Steward of the Chiltern Hundreds. He died in Plymouth in 1872.

Parliament of the United Kingdom
| Preceded by James Wyld; Henry Charles Lacy | Member of Parliament for Bodmin; 1852–1857; Served alongside: Charles Graves-Sawle | Succeeded by John Vivian; James Wyld |
| Preceded by John Vivian; James Wyld | Member of Parliament for Bodmin; 1859; Served alongside: Hon. Frederick Leveson-Gower | Succeeded by Hon. Frederick Leveson-Gower; James Wyld |
