= Septimus Arabin =

Royal Navy officer (1785–1855)

Rear-Admiral Septimius Arabin (10 November 1785 – December 1855) was a Royal Navy officer who served in the French Revolutionary and Napoleonic Wars.

== Life ==
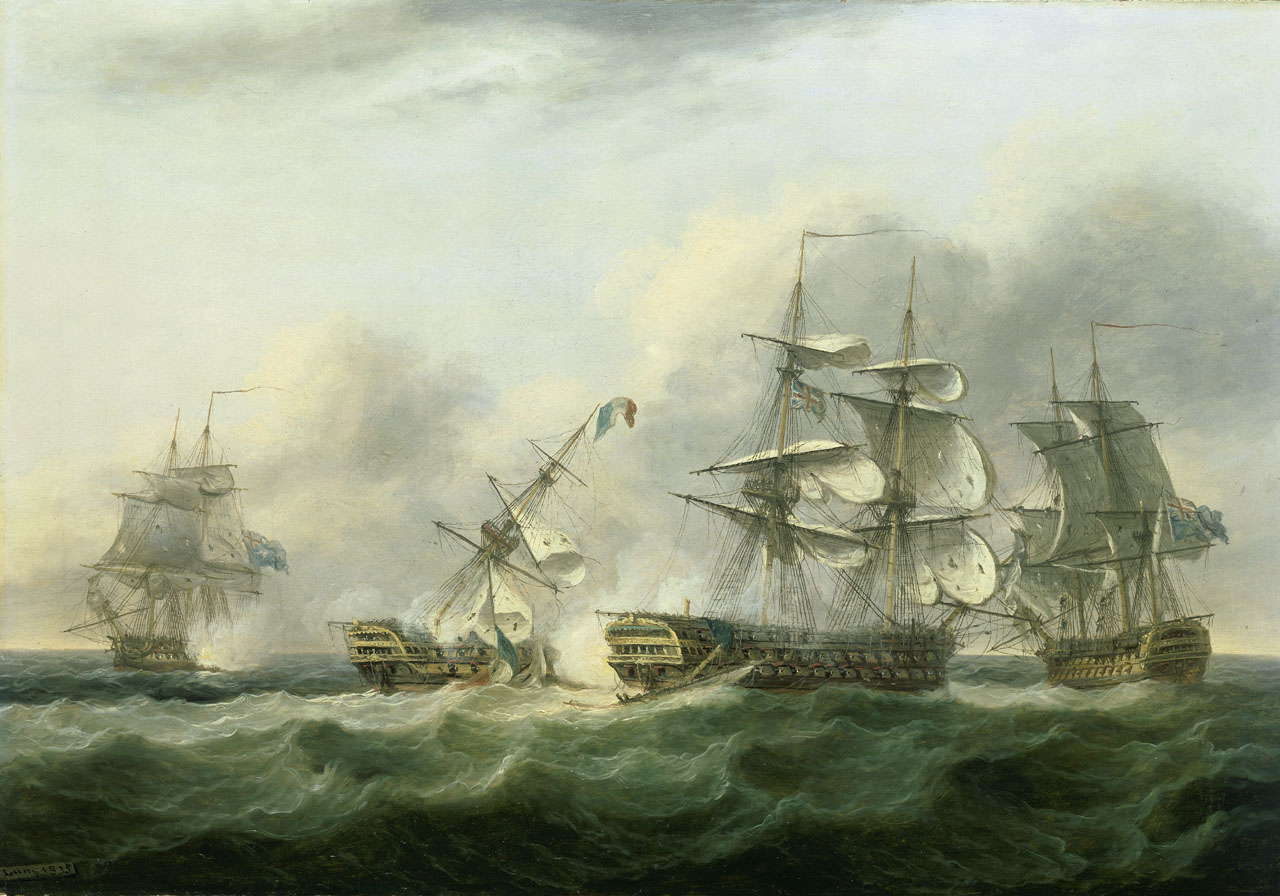
HMS Foudroyant at battle

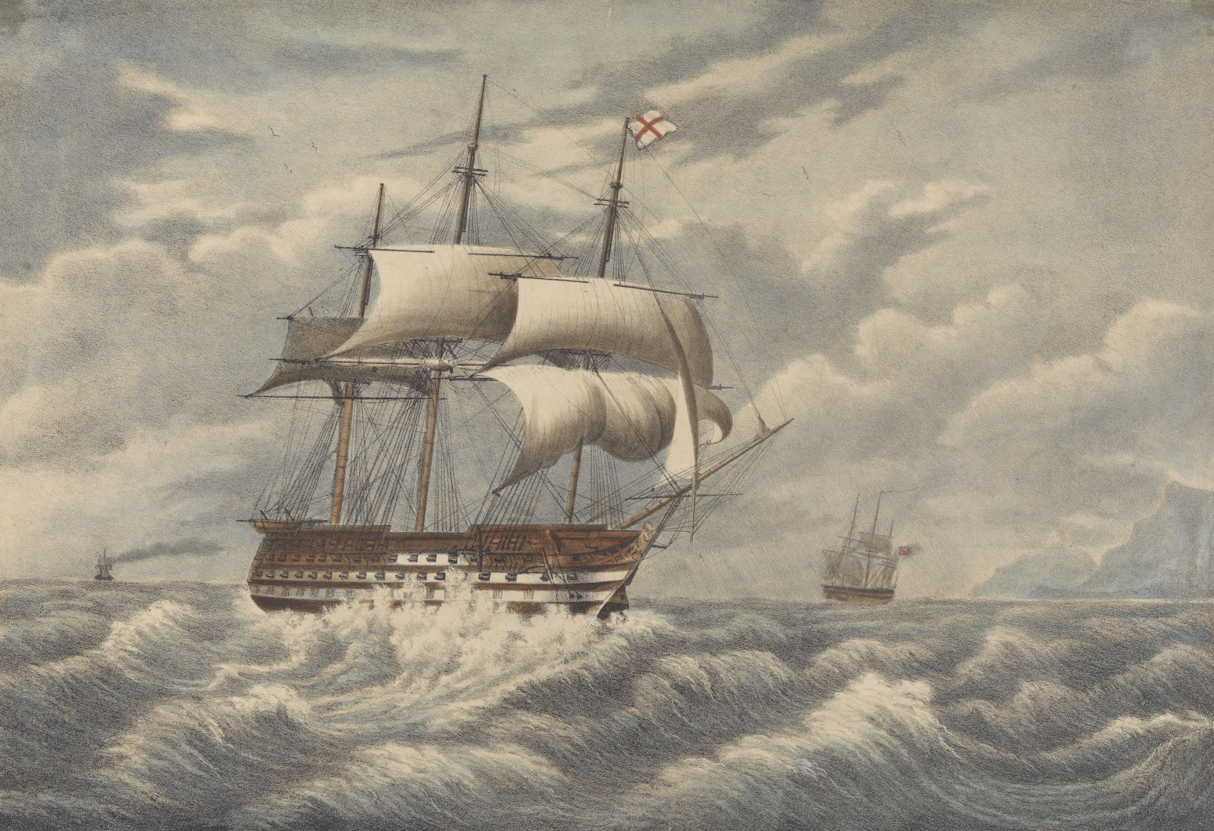
HMS Hibernia

Septimus (or Septimius) Arabin was born on 10 November 1785, the fifth of the nine sons of Henry Arabin, a Dublin lawyer, industrialist (part owner of the Corkagh gunpowder mills) and political activist. His mother, Ann Favière Grant, was of Scottish/Huguenot extraction but grew up in Dublin. His paternal great-grandfather John Arabin raised the 57th (West Middlesex) Regiment of Foot at the onset of the Seven Years' War.

While several of his brothers became officers in the British Army, Septimus preferred to join the Royal Navy. In April 1799 he took part in the defence of the city of Acre against the French fleet as part of the Egyptian campaign. He was a cadet officer on the 74-gun HMS Tigre which had been captured from the French in 1795.

In November 1802 he was ranked midshipman and transferred to the newly-launched 50-gun HMS Antelope which was based in the English Channel protecting against the potential French invasion.

In 1805 Arabin passed the Lieutenant's exam. In 1806 he was given the role of master's mate on the 74 gun HMS Pompee and was involved in major attacks on the Turkish fleet in February and March 1807 at the Dardanelles under Captain Richard Dacres. Arabin was promoted to Lieutenant in August 1807.

In August 1807 he transferred to HMS Foudroyant. Eleven days later he took place in a major sea battle: The Second Battle of Copenhagen which turned into a siege which lasted three weeks. In 1808 the Foudroyant spent many months patrolling off the South American coast. Still there in February 1810, Arabin transferred to HMS Theseus and in 1812 to HMS Tremendous, both 74 gun ships, and both based off the English coast.

Late in 1812 he transferred to HMS Hiberia (110 guns and a crew of almost 400) as their Flag Lieutenant. He was promoted to Commander on Hibernia in July 1814, but he was immediately placed on half pay. He remained in this status for 7 years eventually being given command of the sloop HMS Argus in July 1821, serving off Halifax, Nova Scotia with a crew of 120 men. He was promoted to Captain and Commander in March 1823. In December 1825 he got a new (but final) command: the 28 gun HMS North Star.

He retired with the rank of Rear Admiral in October 1846. He moved to the South of France on health grounds and died in Nice in the final days of December 1855.

== Family ==
In February 1826 in the chapel of the British Embassy in Paris he married Marie Rumbold (1788-1875) daughter of Sir George Rumbold, 2nd Baronet.
