= Caroline Arnott =

Daughter:Sir Frederick Martin Williams/2nd Bt./Tregullow

Dame Caroline Sydney Arnott, Lady Arnott DBE JP (née Williams; 22 March 1859 – 28 December 1933) was an English philanthropist.

== Family ==
Caroline Sydney Williams was born at 30, St James's Square, Bath, one of 12 children of Mary Christian Law Williams and Frederick Williams. In 1870, her father succeeded as 2nd Baronet of Tregullow in the County of Cornwall.

She married Major Sir John Alexander Arnott, 2nd Bt. (16 November 1853 – 26 July 1940), son of Sir John Arnott, 1st Bt. and Mary (née McKinlay), on 27 September 1881, publisher of the Irish Times. He held the office of Justice of the Peace (JP) for County Cork and also served as Deputy Lieutenant (DL) of County Cork. She spent her married life in Dublin, where she was active in charitable causes, including raising £50,000 (equivalent to £2,456,000 in 2025) for an Irish War Memorial for the First World War.

=== Children ===
- Margaret Christian Salomé Arnott (1883 – 14 March 1952)
- Captain John Arnott (25 July 1885 – 30 March 1918)
- Lina Victoria Arnott (1887 – 25 October 1974)
- Mary Christian Arnott (1887 – 26 May 1936)
- Sir Lauriston John Arnott, 3rd Bt. (27 November 1890 – 2 July 1958)
- Sir Robert John Arnott, 4th Bt. (19 August 1896 – 25 July 1966)
- Major Thomas John Arnott (12 April 1899 – 16 July 1979)

== Investitures ==
She was invested as a Lady of Grace, Order of St John of Jerusalem (LGStJ). She held the office of Justice of the Peace (JP). In 1918, she was invested as a Dame Commander of the Order of the British Empire when she was vice president of the Soldiers and Sailors Help Society, Dublin, for her war work.

== Death ==
Dame Caroline Arnott died on 28 December 1933 in Leicester. She was buried in Saint Fintan's Cemetery in Sutton, Dublin, Ireland.
