= Geoffrey Wilson (British politician) =

Hugh Geoffrey Birch Wilson CBE (11 June 1903 – 11 April 1975) was a Conservative party politician in the United Kingdom.

Wilson was a son of F. J. Wilson CIE, of Sidmouth, and his wife Mary Phoebe, daughter of Colonel E. Birch, IMS. He was educated at Clifton College and Pembroke College, Cambridge, and admitted as a Solicitor in 1928. He worked in the Solicitors Department of the Great Western Railway, 1928 to 1947, rising to senior solicitor assistant in the Parliamentary and General section; he was then assistant solicitor to the British Transport Commission's Railway Executive, Western Region, 1948 to 1949, and resigned in January 1949, to stand for parliament. He served as member of parliament (MP) for Truro from its re-creation by boundary changes coming into effect at the February 1950 election until his retirement in 1970.

Parliament of the United Kingdom
New constituency	Member of Parliament for Truro; 1950 – 1970	Succeeded by Piers Dixon
