= William Daniel (died 1633) =

Member of the Parliament of England

William Daniel (died 1633) was an English merchant and briefly a Member of Parliament.

He was the father of two sons, including a later MP for Truro, Richard Daniel. In 1601, he was one of the Members of Parliament for Truro.
