= John Ennis Vivian =

British politician

John Ennis Vivian MP

Member of Parliament for Truro
- In office 9 January 1835 – 27 March 1857 Serving with Henry Vivian (1852–1857); Humphrey Willyams (1849–1852); Edmund Turner (1837–1849); William Tooke (1835–1837)
- Preceded by: Hussey Vivian; William Tooke
- Succeeded by: Augustus Smith; Edward Brydges Willyams

Personal details
- Born: 1787
- Died: 24 May 1870 (aged 82–83)
- Party: Conservative

John Ennis Vivian (1787 – 24 May 1870) was a British Conservative politician.

Vivian was first elected as the Conservative MP for Truro at the 1835 general election and held the seat for 22 years, standing down at the 1857 general election.

Parliament of the United Kingdom
Preceded by Hussey Vivian; William Tooke	Member of Parliament for Truro; 1835–1857; With: Henry Vivian (1852–1857); Humphrey Willyams (1849–1852); Edmund Turner (1837–1849); William Tooke (1835–1837)	Succeeded by Augustus Smith; Edward Brydges Willyams
