= John Carminow =

English politician (1510s–1592)

John Carminow or Carminowe (c. 1516 – 1592) was an English politician.

He was the eldest son of Thomas Carminow, of Respryn, a gentleman of the bedchamber to Henry VIII, and his wife Elizabeth, daughter of Edward Cheeseman, Cofferer of the Household to King Henry VII, and sister to Robert Cheeseman.

His younger brother, Nicholas Carminowe, was the MP for Launceston (Dunheved) and Bodmin.

He was a member of parliament (MP) for Cornwall (5 October 1553 – 5 December 1553) and Truro (1563–1567). He was High Sheriff of Cornwall for 1558–59.

In spite of being described as 'an old fornicator, a common drunkard, corrupt, ignorant' he was a justice of the peace from 1569 until his death.

He married Margaret, daughter of Christopher Tredinnick, and they had 3 sons, including George and Oliver, MP for St. Mawes, and subsequently for Truro and Tregony and a daughter, Mary.
