= Ralph Trenewith (died 1393) =

14th-century English politician

Ralph Trenewith (died 1393), of Trenowth in St. Probus, Cornwall, was an English Member of Parliament for Truro 1377 and 1393.
