= Thomas Roydon =

16th-century English politician

- In office 1553–1557
- Constituency: Truro

Thomas Roydon (c. 1521 – c. 1565) was an English merchant in the tin trade and politician. In jeux, and three subsequent parliaments, he was a member of parliament for Truro.
