= William Iseham =

16th-century English politician

William Iseham was an English politician. He was a Member of Parliament for Truro in 1554. This was under the reign of Queen Mary when parliament met at Oxford.

In around 1551–1553, Iseham and his wife Margery were defendants in a case brought by Michael Rosewaren of Camborne in Chancery/Star Chamber for enclosure of common in Trevaswythen.
