= Edwin Jaggard =

Edwin K. G. "Ed" Jaggard (born 1942) is an honorary professor at the School of Arts and Humanities in the Edith Cowan University, Western Australia, who specialised in the study of local history, in the study of surf lifesaving in Australia and in the politics of Cornwall, UK in the 19th century.

He holds Bachelor of Arts, Bachelor of Education and Master of Arts degrees from the University of Western Australia, and was awarded a Ph.D. by the Washington University in St. Louis in 1980 for a dissertation titled "Patrons, Principles and Parties: Cornwall Politics 1760–1910".

== Publications ==
This is an incomplete list.

- Cornwall Politics in the Age of Reform 1790-1855, Royal Historical Society/Boydell Press, (1999), ISBN 0-86193-243-9.

This work is described by the RHS as: "This detailed case-study offers a penetrating analysis of the changing political culture in Cornwall up to and after the introduction of the 1832 electoral system. It spans a century in which the country’s parliamentary over-representation and notorious political corruption was replaced by a politicised electorate for whom issues and principles were usually paramount. Several modes of electoral behaviour are tested; in particular, the continuous political activism of Cornwall’s farmers stands out. Despite remnants of the unreformed electoral system lingering into the mid-Victorian era, Cornwall developed a powerful Liberal tradition, built upon distinctive patterns of non-conformity; the Conservatives, split by dissension, saw their pre-reform ascendancy disappear."

- "Managers and Agents: Conservative Party Organisation in the 1850s" in Parliamentary History 27 (1), 7–18 (2008)
- Between the Flags: One Hundred Summers of Australian Surf Lifesaving, UNSW Press, (2006), ISBN 9780868408972, (edited).

For further titles, search The catalogue of the library of ECU.
