= Samuel Butcher (bishop) =

Irish Anglican bishop

Samuel Butcher PC (9 October 1811 – 29 July 1876) was an Irish Anglican bishop in the Church of Ireland in the 19th century.

== Biography ==
Butcher was born in Danesfort, County Kerry, the son of Samuel Butcher, a distinguished Royal Navy commander, and Elizabeth Anne Herbert. He was educated at home until 1827, when he entered a school in Cork. He graduated from Trinity College Dublin in 1829 and joined the clergy of the Church of Ireland.

Between 1837 and 1852 he was a Fellow of Trinity College, Dublin and in 1849 and became a Doctor of Divinity. He was Professor of Ecclesiastical History at Trinity College in 1850, before working as Professor of Divinity from 1852 to 1866. He was the Rector of Ballymoney, County Antrim between 1854 and 1866. In 1866 Butcher became Bishop of Meath, and was subsequently made a member of the Privy Council of Ireland. As bishop he was influential in promoting an endowment for the divinity school of Trinity College. He took on a prominent role in doctrinal and practical leadership following the disestablishment of the Church of Ireland under the Irish Church Act 1869, when his scholarship helped to inform the church's approach to issues such as the revision of the Prayer Book.

Butcher married Mary Leahy, daughter of John Leahy, on 23 November 1847. Together they had six children. His second son was John Butcher, 1st Baron Danesfort and his eldest daughter married Thomas Spring Rice, 2nd Baron Monteagle of Brandon. Butcher caused controversy in Anglo-Irish society when he committed suicide on 29 July 1876. The inquest into his death decided that this was the result of a temporary insanity brought on by fever. The Diocesan Report for 1875, which was presented to the general synod in October 1876, recorded that Butcher's "influence was constantly exercised in the interests of moderation and of peace, and he was frequently instrumental in effecting amicable and satisfactory solutions of difficulties that threatened to be most serious."

== Works ==
The Ecclesiastical Calendar: Its theory and construction, Dublin: 1877. Edited and published posthumously by his sons Samuel Henry Butcher and John George Butcher.
