= Thomas Burgess (died 1623) =

English merchant

Thomas Burgess (ca. 1540 – 13 August 1623), of Truro in Cornwall, was an English merchant, and was Mayor of Truro in 1589 and an alderman of the town at the time its coat of arms was confirmed in 1620. He was Member of Parliament for Truro in the Parliament of 1604–1611.
