= Edward Cheeseman =

English lawyer and administrator

Edward Cheeseman (died 1509), also written Cheseman, was an English lawyer and administrator from Middlesex.

== Origins ==
There was a William Cheeseman living in Southall in 1382, but the family only rose to prominence with Edward, who was born about 1455. He had two younger brothers, John and Robert, who reportedly did not leave sons.

== Career ==
Entering on a legal career, he became first a filacer, or issuer of writs, and later an attorney in the Court of King's Bench. His final post was as a senior member of the royal household of King Henry VII, when he became Cofferer of the Household some time after September 1505. As such he attended the funeral of the King in April 1509, but himself died in August, asking to be buried in Blackfriars church in London.

His will was proved in November 1510, and he left extensive landholdings in Middlesex and Kent to his son. These included in Middlesex the manor and mansion house of Dormanswell in Southall, together with the manor of Southall which he had bought in 1496, and the manor of Norwood, together with the manors of Osterley and of Wyke. In Kent, he left land at Sundridge, Chevening, and Lewisham.

== Family ==
Before 1485 he married Joan Lawrence, from Lancashire, and they had six known children:

Robert;
Eleanor;
Mary, who first married a man called Catesby from Bedfordshire and secondly John Tawe, a lawyer;
Grace, said to have married a Keeper of Windsor Forest;
Elizabeth I, married first Thomas Carminow (died 1529), of Respryn near Bodmin, a Gentleman Usher of the Privy Chamber, becoming the mother of John Carminow and Nicholas Carminow, and after his death married secondly Edward Cleker;
Elizabeth II (died after 1547), a nun first at Holywell Priory and later at Kilburn.

His widow married John Banester and died in 1536.
