= Trenwith =

Trenwith is a surname. Notable people with the surname include:

- George Trenwith (1851–1890), American baseball player
- John Trenwith (1951–1998), New Zealand writer, humorist and academic
- Mark Trenwith, Australian comedian and actor
- Michael Trenwith (born 1945), English cricketer
- William Trenwith (1846–1925), Australian trade unionist and politician
