= Thomas Burgess (died 1626) =

English Member of Parliament

Thomas Burgess (c. 1580 – July 1626), of Truro in Cornwall, was an English Member of Parliament. He represented Truro in the Parliaments of 1614 and 1624–5, and either he or his father sat for the same borough in 1604–1611. He also served as Mayor of Truro.
