= Samuel Butcher (Royal Navy officer) =

Vice-Admiral Samuel Butcher
- Born: 22 November 1770; Cople, Bedfordshire, England
- Died: 8 May 1849 (aged 78); Cobh, County Cork, Ireland
- Spouse: Elizabeth Herbert
- Relatives: Samuel Butcher (son)
- Military career
- Allegiance: Great Britain; United Kingdom
- Branch: Royal Navy
- Service years: 1786–1815
- Rank: Vice-Admiral
- Commands: HMS Guachapin; HMS Barham; HMS Antelope
- Conflicts: French Revolutionary Wars; Glorious First of June; Battle of Groix; Napoleonic Wars; Gunboat War

Vice-Admiral Samuel Butcher (22 November 1770 – 8 May 1849) was an officer of the British Royal Navy during the French Revolutionary and Napoleonic Wars.

== Biography ==
Butcher was born in Cople, Bedfordshire, the son of Thomas Butcher of Northampton, and Elizabeth Ives, and was the grandson of Robert Butcher of Ickleford, Hertfordshire, Lord of the manor of Ravensden, and high sheriff of Bedfordshire in 1761. He entered the Navy on 4 February 1786, as captain's servant on board the cutter Barracouta, under the command of his relative (Note: O'Byrne describes Butcher and Barlow as relatives, presumably through Barlow's mother Hilare Butcher, without being more specific.) Lieutenant Robert Barlow, employed in suppressing smuggling in the English Channel. From November 1788 Butcher served as an able seaman in Salisbury, the flagship of Admiral Mark Milbanke at Newfoundland.

In June 1791 Butcher rejoined Barlow as a master's mate in the 16-gun brig-sloop Childers, attached to the Channel Fleet. He later served in the 98-gun ship Queen, bearing the flag of Rear-Admiral Alan Gardner, and was present at the unsuccessful first attempt to capture Martinique in 1793. He also took part, under Admiral Lord Howe, in the actions of 28 and 29 May, and 1 June 1794, on the two last days with the rank of acting-lieutenant.

Butcher was confirmed in that rank on 17 July 1794, while serving once again under Barlow, now aboard the frigate Aquilon. He was the first lieutenant of Aquilon when she acted as a repeating ship in Admiral Lord Bridport's battle with the French off the Ile de Groix on 23 June 1795. On 9 October 1795 Butcher was appointed to the ship Sans Pareil, flagship of Lord Hugh Seymour, serving in the Channel and the West Indies. On 28 April 1800 he was appointed by Lord Seymour as commander of the brig Guachapin. Guachapin was a former Spanish letter of marque and mounted fourteen 4-pounder guns and two 18-pounder carronades, with a complement of 65 men and boys. On 19 February 1801 his promotion to commander was confirmed. On 21 April 1801, Butcher, under cover of the Guachapin's fire, cut out a privateer from the Bay of Aguada, Puerto Rico, even though it was lashed to the shore and defended by two formidable batteries and a range of howitzers and small arms.

On 18 August 1801, while cruising between Martinique and Saint Lucia, Guachapin fought and captured the Spanish letter-of-marque La Teresa, which had a crew of 120 (nearly twice that of Guachapin), and was more heavily armed, with two long 18-pounder guns, ten long 12-pounder guns, and six 36-pounder carronades. The action lasted for two and half hours, with the yards of the two ships being part of the time locked together. However, when Heureux, under Captain Loftus Otway Bland, approached, La Teresa surrendered. For these and other services Butcher was promoted to post-rank on 29 April 1802, during the Peace of Amiens.

Between March 1804 and December 1808, Butcher commanded a district of Sea Fencibles in Ireland, but did not return to sea until 18 November 1812 when he was appointed to temporary command of the 74-gun ship Barham. Soon after, on 21 December 1812, he took command of the 50-gun frigate Antelope. He was employed in protecting shipping in the Great Belt, and was particularly successful in capturing the enemy's gun-boats and privateers. For example:

- On 6, 25 and 30 October 1813 Antelope captured and destroyed the Danish armed rowboats Buonaparte, Nye, Prove, Fera Venner, No.25, and Morgan Stierner.
- On 23 October 1813 Bruizer and Antelope recaptured the Alida.
- On 24 October 1813 Antelope and Bruizer captured the Danish privateer Eleonora.

On 1 March 1814 Butcher in Antelope joined the fleet of Admiral William Young off the mouth of the Eastern Scheldt in the Netherlands. Antelope was sent with two other ships to reinforce the squadron of frigates in the Western Scheldt, but owing to the illness of one pilot and the desertion of the other, Antelope ran aground off Flushing. For 48 hours she lay exposed to continuous barrage of shells from enemy batteries on shore, but was (to the astonishment of the whole fleet) eventually able to free herself and escape. Subsequently, by order from Lord Melville, Captain Butcher attended a grand levée at Portsmouth, and was presented to the Prince Regent by Rear-Admiral Sir Henry Blackwood as "the officer who had so highly distinguished himself in the Scheldt." After a voyage to Quebec, Butcher paid off the Antelope on 22 December 1815.

Butcher saw no further service afloat, but continued to progress up the Navy List until attaining flag-rank; being promoted to rear-admiral on 17 August 1840, then to vice-admiral on 19 February 1847. He died at Cobh, County Cork, on 8 May 1849, and was interred in the family vault at St. Mary's, Shandon, Cork.

== Personal life ==
On 4 February 1806 Butcher married Elizabeth, the daughter of Richard Townsend Herbert, MP, of Killarney, County Kerry. Over the next twenty-one years they had thirteen children, nine boys and four girls:

- Robert Butcher (1807–1873)
- Richard George Butcher (1808–1815)
- Elizabeth Jane Butcher (1810–1872)
- Most Rev. Rt. Hon. Samuel Butcher DD PC (1811–1876), Fellow of Trinity College, Dublin (1837), Professor of Ecclesiastical History (1850), Regius Professor of Divinity (1852), Bishop of Meath (1866).
- Thomas Arthur Butcher (1812–1840)
- Dr. Richard George Herbert Butcher, MD MRIA FRCS (1816–1891), President of the Royal College of Surgeons in Ireland, 1866–67.
- Hilaire Frances Butcher (1817–?)
- Edward Robert Butcher (1819–1831)
- George Butcher (1820–1839)
- Major-General Arthur Butcher, Royal Marines Light Infantry (1822–1883)
- Helena Butcher (1823–1839)
- Elizabeth Anne Butcher (1825–1826)
- Captain John Barlow Butcher, Royal Marines Light Infantry (1827–1888)

== Coat of arms ==
According to the visitation of the Ulster King of Arms, Butcher of Danesfort, Killarney, County Kerry, and Cork was entitled to a coat of arms described thusly:

- Escutcheon: Vert, an elephant argent.
- Crest. A branch of a cotton tree fructed proper.
- Motto: "Be steady".

== See also ==
- Samuel Henry Butcher
- John Butcher, 1st Baron Danesfort
