= Arthur Tremayne =

Member of Parliament for Truro
- In office 1878–1880 Serving with James McGarel-Hogg
- Preceded by: Frederick Williams, Bt.; James McGarel-Hogg
- Succeeded by: Edward Brydges Willyams; James McGarel-Hogg

Personal details
- Born: 15 May 1827
- Died: 14 November 1905 (aged 78)
- Party: Conservative
- Spouse: Margaret Frances Hely-Hutchinson
- Parent: John Hearle Tremayne (father)

Arthur Tremayne (15 May 1827 – 14 November 1905) was a Crimean War soldier and Cornish MP, who survived the charge of the Light Brigade, during which his horse was shot from under him.

== Personal life ==
Arthur Tremayne, born on 15 May 1827, was the son of John Hearle Tremayne (1780–1851), MP, and his wife, Caroline Matilda Lemon, the daughter of Sir William Lemon MP, and the sister of Sir Charles Lemon MP. After Sir Charles Lemon's death on 13 February 1868, he inherited most of his wealth.

He married on 22 September 1858, Lady Margaret Frances Hely-Hutchinson, second daughter of Lord Donoughmore. They had the following children:

- Arthur Richard (died in infancy),
- Francis William (born 6 October 1862)
- Caroline Mary (died in infancy),
- two other sons,
- another daughter, also called Caroline Mary who married Francis Alexander on 31 January 1883 at St George's Church, Hanover Square, London.

His first wife died in 1866. In 1870, he remarried to Emma Penelope Phillpotts. They had two sons. Tremayne died on 14 November 1905.

== Crimean War ==
During the Crimean War, Tremayne was a captain in the 13th Light Dragoons, he commanded Troup E in the Charge of the Light Brigade. His horse was shot under him. Joseph Malone, his Lance-Sergeant, was awarded the Victoria Cross.

== Parliamentary career ==
He was Conservative MP for the Truro constituency from September 1878 until 1880.

Parliament of the United Kingdom
Preceded by Sir Frederick Williams, Bt. Sir James McGarel-Hogg	Member of Parliament for Truro; 1878–1880; With: Sir James McGarel-Hogg	Succeeded by Edward Brydges Willyams; Sir James McGarel-Hogg
