= Nicholas Carminow =

English politician (c.1519–1569)

Nicholas Carminow (c. 1519–1569), of Respryn, Cornwall, was an English politician.

He was the second son of Thomas Carminow, of Respryn, a gentleman of the bedchamber to Henry VIII, and his wife Elizabeth, daughter of Edward Cheeseman, Cofferer of the Household to King Henry VII, and sister to Robert Cheeseman. His elder brother was John Carminow.

He was a Member (MP) of the Parliament of England for Dunheved in 1547 and for Bodmin in 1559.
