= Oliver Carminow =

16th-century English politician

Oliver Carminow, or Carminowe (died 1597), from Fentongollan, St Michael Penkevil in Cornwall, was a Member in the Parliament of England.

== Biography ==
Carminow was the son of John Carminow, MP. He represented St Mawes (1563–1567), Truro (1572–1581) and Tregony (1586–1587).

== Family ==
He married Mary Coryton, daughter of Peter Coryton, and left two daughters. He is said to have inherited great wealth but squandered almost the whole fortune before his death.
