= Sir Frederick Williams, 2nd Baronet =

Sir Frederick Martin Williams, 2nd Baronet

Member of Parliament for Truro
- In office 1865–1878
- Preceded by: Montague Edward Smith and Augustus Smith
- Succeeded by: Arthur Tremayne and Sir James McGarel-Hogg

Personal details
- Born: 25 January 1830
- Died: 3 September 1878 (aged 48) Heanton Court, Barnstaple, Devon
- Party: Conservative
- Spouse: Mary Christian Law
- Children: William Robert Frederick; Mary; Beatrice; Leonard; Caroline six other children
- Occupation: Politician

Sir Frederick Martin Williams, 2nd Baronet DL (25 January 1830 – 3 September 1878) was a politician in the United Kingdom. He was Conservative Member of Parliament (MP) for Truro in Cornwall from 1865 until his death in 1878.

== Personal life ==
He was the son of Sir William Williams, (1791 – 24 March 1870), of the Williams family of Caerhays and Burncoose, the first Baronet (Williams of Tregullow) and his wife Caroline Eales. In 1858 he married Miss Mary Christian Law, the granddaughter of Dr George Henry Law, formerly Bishop of Bath and Wells.

An estimated 2,000 people attended his funeral at Gwennap where he was buried in the family vault. His residence was at Goonvrea in the parish of Perranarworthal and the family seat was at Tregullow near Scorrier House. Sir Frederick bequeathed all his real and personal estate to his widow (estimated at under £160,000) and the large freehold property, of Tregullow to his heir, Sir William Williams, 3rd Baronet, of Tregullow. An Order of the High Court of Justice required the lease of the Prince of Wales Quarry at Trewarner Down in the Manor of Tintagel, which was owned by the deceased, to be sold at auction on 30 August 1880. The quarry included the only beam engine in north Cornwall, which hauled stone from the pit and drained the quarry. The beam engine was expensive when installed in July 1871 for £1,590 4s.

== Cornish Bank ==
Sir Frederick Williams was a major shareholder of the Cornish Bank with a one-third share. The Cornish Bank "closed its doors" on Saturday, 4 January 1879, following persistent rumours, that following his death, his property and resources would be withdrawn from the bank. The bank issued a circular on 27 December 1878 in an attempt to dispel the rumours claiming they were making arrangements to replace Sir Frederick's share of the capital. One rumour was that Sir Frederick was overdrawn on his account by £80,000 and consequently, the creditors became alarmed and there was a run on the Bank on Wednesday, 1 January. The bank had branches in Falmouth, Penryn, Redruth and Truro with the first one established in either 1770 or 1771 in Boscawen Street, Truro.

Parliament of the United Kingdom
Preceded by Montague Edward Smith and Augustus Smith	Member of Parliament for Truro; 1865–1878; With: Augustus Smith, to 1865; John Cranch Walker, 1865–1871; Sir James McGarel-Hogg, from 1871	Succeeded by Arthur Tremayne and Sir James McGarel-Hogg
Baronetage of the United Kingdom
Preceded by William Williams	Baronet (of Tregullow); 1870–1878	Succeeded by William Robert Williams
