= John Vivian (Liberal politician) =

English Liberal politician

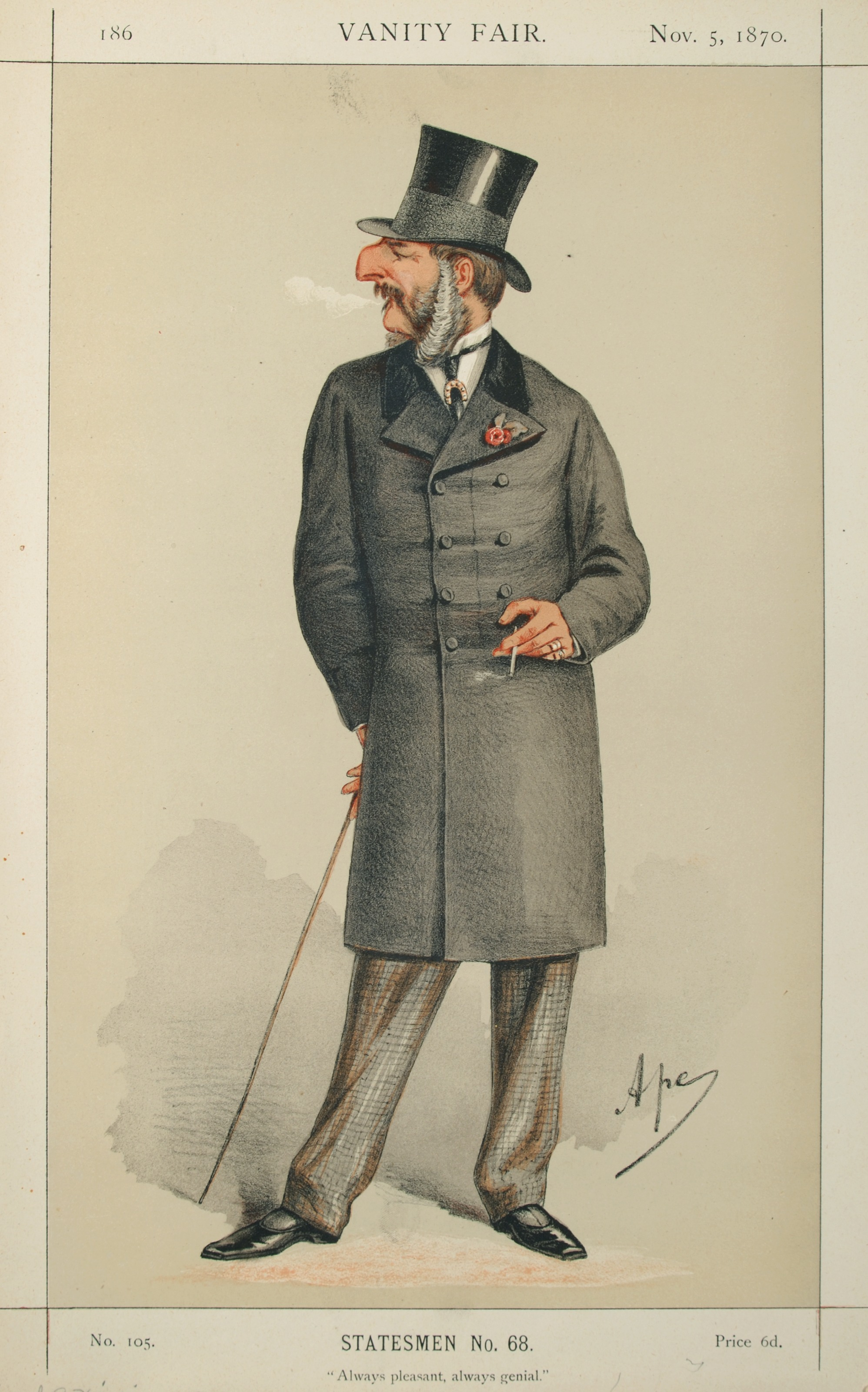
"Always pleasant, always genial." Vivian as caricatured by Ape (Carlo Pellegrini) in Vanity Fair, November 1870

John Cranch Walker Vivian (18 April 1818 – 22 January 1879) was an English Liberal politician from the Vivian family who sat in the House of Commons variously between 1841 and 1871.

== Career ==
Vivian was the second son of the Lieutenant-general Sir Richard Hussey Vivian and his first wife Eliza De Crespigny, daughter of Philip Campion De Crespigny. Born at the Château de Rosamel in Frencq, France, he was educated at Eton College and joined the 11th Hussars as cornet in February 1836. He became a lieutenant in December 1837, captain in April 1840 and retired in 1842. Vivian was a deputy lieutenant and JP for Cornwall.

Vivian was elected Member of Parliament for Penryn and Falmouth in July 1841 and held the seat until July 1847. He was elected MP for Bodmin in April 1857 and held the seat until May 1859, when he stood unsuccessfully at Truro. At the 1865 general election he was elected Member of Parliament for Truro and he held the seat until 1871. He was appointed a Lord of the Treasury in December 1868, holding office until 1870 when he was appointed Financial Secretary to the War Office. He held that office until 1871 when he was appointed Under-Secretary of State for War, thereby vacating his seat.

Vivian died at the age of 60 at his home at The Priory, Richmond, London, leaving a personal estate of less than £1,000 to his widow.

== Family ==
Vivian married firstly in 1840 Louisa Woodgate, daughter of Henry Woodgate. She died in 1855 and he married secondly in 1861 Florence Grosvenor Rowley, daughter of Major Rowley of the Bombay Cavalry. They were divorced in August 1869 after she eloped with the Marquess of Waterford, and married him on 3 July 1872. She died 4 April 1873. Vivian married, thirdly, Emma Harvey in 1876. His grandson, Herbert Vivian was a journalist, writer and newspaper proprietor who was one of the key members of the Neo-Jacobite Revival of the 1880s and 1890s.

Parliament of the United Kingdom
Preceded by Edward John Hutchins; James William Freshfield	Member of Parliament for Penryn & Falmouth; 1841–1847; With: James Hanway Plumridge	Succeeded by Howel Gwyn; Francis Mowatt
Preceded by William Michell; Charles Graves-Sawle	Member of Parliament for Bodmin; 1857–1859; With: James Wyld	Succeeded by William Michell; Frederick Leveson-Gower
Preceded by Augustus Smith; Sir Frederick Williams, Bt	Member of Parliament for Truro; 1865–1871; With: Sir Frederick Williams, Bt	Succeeded by James McGarel-Hogg; Sir Frederick Williams, Bt
