= Truro (constituency) =

Former parliamentary constituency in the United Kingdom

- Former county constituency for the House of Commons
- Boundary of Truro in Cornwall for the 1992 general election

- Location of Cornwall within England
- County: Cornwall
- Major settlements: Truro, St Austell

1950–1997
- Seats: One
- Created from: Penryn and Falmouth and Camborne
- Replaced by: Truro & St Austell

1885–1918
- Seats: One
- Type of constituency: County constituency
- Created from: Helston, Truro and West Cornwall
- Replaced by: Penryn and Falmouth, St Ives and Camborne

1295–1885
- Seats: Two
- Type of constituency: Borough constituency
- Replaced by: Truro

Truro was the name of a parliamentary constituency in Cornwall represented in the House of Commons of England and later of Great Britain from 1295 until 1800, then in the Parliament of the United Kingdom from 1801 to 1918 and finally from 1950 to 1997. Until 1885 it was a parliamentary borough, electing two members of parliament (MPs) by the plurality-at-large system of election; the name was then transferred to the surrounding county constituency, which elected a single Member by the first past the post system. In 1997, although there had been no changes to its boundaries, it was renamed as Truro and St Austell, reflecting the fact that St Austell by then had a larger population than Truro.

== Boundaries ==
1950–1974: The Borough of Truro, the Urban District of St Austell, the Rural District of Truro except the parish of Gwennap, and in the Rural District of St Austell the parishes of Creed, Grampound, Roche, St Dennis, St Ewe, St Goran, St Mewan, St Michael Caerhays, and St Stephen-in-Brannel.

1974–1983: The Boroughs of Truro, and St Austell with Fowey, the Rural District of Truro except the parish of Gwennap, and in the Rural District of St Austell the parishes of Creed, Grampound, Roche, St Dennis, St Ewe, St Goran, St Mewan, St Michael Caerhays, and St Stephen-in-Brannel.

1983–1997: The District of Carrick wards of Boscawen, Chacewater, Feock, Kea, Kenwyn, Moresk, Newlyn, Perranzabuloe, Probus, Roseland, St Agnes, St Clement, Tregolls, and Trehaverne, and the Borough of Restormel wards of Crinnis, Mevagissey, Poltair, Rock, St Ewe, St Mewan, St Stephen-in-Brannel, Trevarna, and Treverbyn.

== History ==
The constituency has existed in a number of different forms. The constituency of Truro, up until 1885 elected two members to parliament; this was reduced to one. In 1918 the constituency was abolished but it was recreated again in 1950.

The seat became a safe Lib Dem bet thanks to the popularity and eloquence of its former MP, David Penhaligon. His death in a car crash, aged only 42, robbed the House of Commons of one of its most independent-minded and pragmatic members. His successor, Matthew Taylor, held the seat comfortably from a by-election in 1987, and remained its MP after the name change in 1997.

== Members of Parliament ==
=== Truro Parliamentary borough ===
==== MPs 1295–1629 ====
- Constituency created (1295)

Parliament	First member	Second member
1358	John Hamely	
1386	John Tregoose	Robert Clerk
1388 (Feb)	Henry Gourlyn	John Tremayne
1388 (Sep)	John Tr...uran	John Trebernet
1390 (Jan)	John Coke	Walter Bloyowe
1390 (Nov)		
1391	John Urban	Roger Juyl
1393	Ralph Trenewith I	Walter Bloyowe
1394		
1395	Richard Respryn	Andrew Borlase
1397 (Jan)	John Trereise	John Megre
1397 (Sep)	Nicholas Trenewith	John Lawhire
1399	Richard Carhorta	Pascoe Polruddan
1401		
1402	Ralph Kayl	John Trereise
1404 (Jan)		
1404 (Oct)		
1406	Ralph Cardrewe	Thomas Brunsham
1407		
1410		
1411	Thomas Paderda	William Colyn
1413 (Feb)		
1413 (May)	John Chinals	William Chamberlain
1414 (Apr)		
1414 (Nov)	John Trereise	William Trethake I
1415		
1416 (Mar)	Peter Hayme	William Moun
1416 (Oct)		
1417	John Megre	Andrew Hirnans
1419	John Trewint	John Langedon
1420	William Panter	Robert Trenerth
1421 (May)	William Trethake II	William Richard
1421 (Dec)	Robert Treage	William Richard
1422	John But	
1425	John But	
1467	Edward Aysshton	
1510–1523	No names known	
1529	Roger Corbet	John Thomas
1536	?Roger Corbet	?
1539	?	
1542	?	
1545	Francis Smith	Robert Trencreke
1547	Robert Trencreke	Nicholas Randall
First Parliament of 1553	Nicholas Randall	Thomas Roydon
Second Parliament of 1553	Nicholas Randall	John Methnes
Parliament of 1554	William Iseham	Thomas Duppa
Parliament of 1554–1555	John Melhuish	Thomas Roydon
Parliament of 1555	Nicholas Randall	Thomas Randall
Parliament of 1558	Nicholas Randall	Thomas Roydon
Parliament of 1563–1567	John Carminow	John Mitchell
Parliament of 1571	Henry Killigrew	Vincent Skinner
Parliament of 1572–1581	Henry Killigrew	Oliver Carminow
Parliament of 1584–1585	Edward Darcy	Michael Hicks
Parliament of 1586–1587	John Stanhope	Roland Lytton
Parliament of 1588–1589	Hannibal Vyvyan	John Woolton
Parliament of 1593	John Parker	Nicholas Smyth
Parliament of 1597–1598	Maurice Berkeley	Reade Stafford
Parliament of 1601	William Daniel	Thomas Harris
Parliament of 1604–1611	Henry Cossen	Thomas Burgess
Addled Parliament (1614)	Thomas Russell	Thomas Burgess, junior
Parliament of 1621–1622	Barnaby Gough, sat for Cambridge Univ. and replaced by Sir John Catcher	John Trefusis
Happy Parliament (1624)	Richard Daniel	Thomas Burgess
Useless Parliament (1625)	William Rous	Henry Rolle
Parliament of 1626	Francis Rous	Henry Rolle
Parliament of 1628	Richard Daniel	Henry Rolle
No Parliament summoned 1629–1640

==== MPs 1640–1885 ====
Election	First member	First party	Second member	Second party
April 1640	Francis Rous	Parliamentarian	John Rolle	Parliamentarian
November 1640	Francis Rous	Parliamentarian	John Rolle	Parliamentarian
November 1648	Francis Rous	Parliamentarian	Rolle died – seat left vacant	
1653	Truro was unrepresented in the Barebones Parliament			
1654	Francis Rous		Truro had only one seat in the First and Second Parliaments of the Protectorate	
1656	Walter Vincent		Truro had only one seat in the First and Second Parliaments of the Protectorate	
January 1659	Walter Vincent		Charles Boscawen	
May 1659	Not represented in the restored Rump			
April 1660	Walter Vincent		Edward Boscawen	
1661	Nicholas Arundell		Edward Boscawen	
1666	John Arundell		Edward Boscawen	
1679	William Boscawen		Edward Boscawen	
1681	Henry Ashurst	Whig	Edward Boscawen	
1685	John Arundell		Henry Vincent	
1689	Sir Henry Ashurst, Bt		Henry Vincent	
1690	John Cloberry		Henry Vincent	
1695	Hugh Fortescue	Whig	Henry Vincent	
March 1701	Sir John Hawles	Whig	Henry Vincent	
December 1701	Sir William Scawen sat for Grampound		Henry Vincent	
February 1702	Sir Robert Cotton	Tory	Henry Vincent	
July 1702	Thomas Powys		Henry Vincent	
November 1702	Sir Philip Meadowes		Henry Vincent	
May 1705	Hugh Boscawen	Whig	Henry Vincent	
November 1705	Peregrine Bertie	Whig	Henry Vincent	
May 1708	James Brydges		Henry Vincent	
December 1708	Robert Furnese	Whig	Henry Vincent	
1710	Hugh Boscawen	Whig	Henry Vincent	
1713	Thomas Hare		William Collier	
1715	John Selwyn		Spencer Cowper	Whig
1721	Thomas Wyndham		Spencer Cowper	Whig
1727	Hugh Boscawen		Sidney Meadows	
1734	Kelland Courtenay		Robert Trefusis	
1741	Charles Hamilton		James Hammond	
1742	Charles Hamilton		Admiral the Hon. Edward Boscawen	Tory
1747	Hon. John Boscawen	Tory	Admiral the Hon. Edward Boscawen	Tory
1761	Hon. John Boscawen	Tory	Lt General the Hon. George Boscawen	Tory
1767	Edward Hugh Boscawen	Tory	Lt General the Hon. George Boscawen	Tory
1774	George Boscawen	Tory	Bamber Gascoyne	Whig
1780	Henry Rosewarne	Whig	Bamber Gascoyne	Whig
1783	John Pollexfen Bastard	Tory	Bamber Gascoyne	Whig
February 1784	Sir John St Aubyn, Bt	Whig	Bamber Gascoyne	Whig
April 1784	William Macarmick	Tory	William Augustus Spencer Boscawen	Tory
1787	John Hiley Addington	Tory	William Augustus Spencer Boscawen	Tory
1790	James Gordon	Tory	William Augustus Spencer Boscawen	Tory
1792	James Gordon	Tory	Charles Ingoldsby Paulet	Tory
1796	Lt Colonel John Leveson-Gower	Tory	John Lemon	Whig
1802	Captain Edward Leveson-Gower	Tory	John Lemon	Whig
1807	Edward Boscawen	Tory	John Lemon	Whig
1808	Charles Powlett Townshend	Tory	John Lemon	Whig
1810	William John Bankes	Tory	John Lemon	Whig
1812	Sir George Warrender, Bt	Tory	John Lemon	Whig
1814	Sir George Warrender, Bt	Tory	George Dashwood	Tory
1818	Lord FitzRoy Somerset	Tory	William Edward Tomline	Tory
1820	Sir Hussey Vivian	Whig	William Gossett	Whig
1826	Lord FitzRoy Somerset	Tory	William Edward Tomline	Tory
1829	Viscount Encombe	Tory	Nathaniel William Peach	Tory
1832	Sir Hussey Vivian	Whig	William Tooke	Whig
1835	John Ennis Vivian	Conservative	William Tooke	Whig
1837	John Ennis Vivian	Conservative	Edmund Turner	Whig
1849	John Ennis Vivian	Conservative	Humphrey Willyams	Whig
1852	John Ennis Vivian	Conservative	Sir Henry Vivian	Whig
1857	Augustus Smith	Whig	Edward Brydges Willyams	Whig
1859	Augustus Smith	Liberal	Montague Edward Smith	Conservative
February 1865	Augustus Smith	Liberal	Sir Frederick Williams, Bt	Conservative
July 1865	Hon. John Vivian	Liberal	Sir Frederick Williams, Bt	Conservative
1871	Sir James McGarel-Hogg, Bt	Conservative	Sir Frederick Williams, Bt	Conservative
1878	Sir James McGarel-Hogg, Bt	Conservative	Arthur Tremayne	Conservative
1880	Sir James McGarel-Hogg, Bt	Conservative	Edward Brydges Willyams	Liberal
1885	Borough constituency abolished – name transferred to single-member county constituency			

=== Truro County constituency ===
==== MPs 1885–1918 ====
Election	Member	Party
1885	William Bickford-Smith	Liberal later Liberal Unionist
1892	John Charles Williams	Liberal Unionist
1895	Sir Edwin Durning-Lawrence	Liberal Unionist
1906	George Hay Morgan	Liberal
1918	constituency abolished	

==== MPs 1950–1997 ====
Election	Member	Party
1950	Geoffrey Wilson	Conservative
1970	Piers Dixon	Conservative
Oct 1974	David Penhaligon	Liberal
1987 by-election	Matthew Taylor	Liberal
1988	Matthew Taylor	Liberal Democrats
1997	name changed to Truro & St. Austell	

== Elections ==
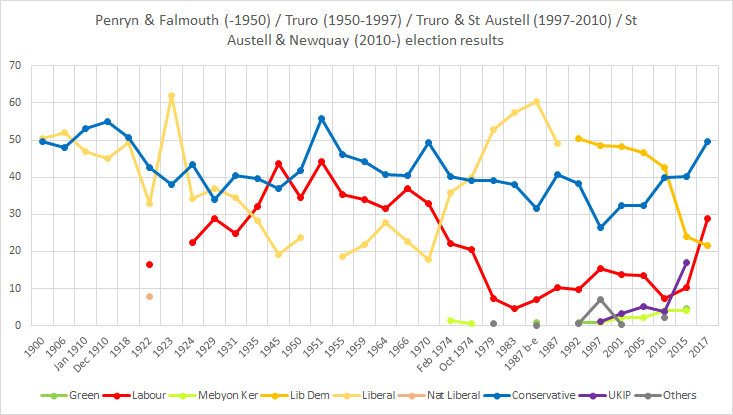
St Austell area election results

=== Elections in the 1830s ===
General election 1830: Truro
Party	Candidate	Votes	%
Tory	John Scott	14	46.7
Tory	Nathaniel William Peach	14	46.7
Whig	John Lubbock	1	3.3
Whig	William Tooke	1	3.3
Majority		13	43.4
Turnout		c. 15	c. 62.5
Registered electors		24	
Tory hold			
Tory hold			

178 free burgesses polled for Lubbock and Tooke, and one for Scott and Peach, but their votes were rejected.

General election 1831: Truro
Party	Candidate	Votes	%	±%
Tory	John Scott	10	45.5	−1.2
Tory	Nathaniel William Peach	10	45.5	−1.2
Whig	William Tooke	1	4.5	+1.2
Whig	Humphrey Willyams	1	4.5	+1.2
Majority		9	41.0	−2.4
Turnout		c. 11	c. 45.8	c. −16.7
Registered electors		24		
Tory hold		Swing	−1.2	
Tory hold		Swing	−1.2	

24 votes were tendered by inhabitant householders for Tooke and Willyams, but these were rejected.

General election 1832: Truro
Party	Candidate	Votes	%	±%
Whig	Hussey Vivian	291	42.2	+37.7
Whig	William Tooke	203	29.4	+24.9
Tory	John Ennis Vivian	196	28.4	−62.6
Majority		7	1.0	N/A
Turnout		386	95.3	c. +49.5
Registered electors		406		
Whig gain from Tory		Swing	+34.5	
Whig gain from Tory		Swing	+28.1	

General election 1835: Truro
Party	Candidate	Votes	%	±%
Conservative	John Ennis Vivian	316	41.3	+12.9
Whig	William Tooke	274	35.8	+6.4
Whig	Hussey Vivian	176	23.0	−19.2
Turnout		456	89.4	−5.9
Registered electors		510		
Majority		42	5.5	N/A
Conservative gain from Whig		Swing	+12.9	
Majority		98	12.8	+11.8
Whig hold		Swing	±0.0	

General election 1837: Truro
Party	Candidate	Votes	%	±%
Whig	Edmund Turner	393	45.0	+22.0
Conservative	John Ennis Vivian	254	29.1	−12.2
Whig	William Tooke	226	25.9	−9.9
Turnout		488	84.3	−5.1
Registered electors		579		
Majority		139	15.9	+3.1
Whig hold		Swing	+14.1	
Majority		28	3.2	−2.3
Conservative hold		Swing	−12.2	

=== Elections in the 1840s ===
General election 1841: Truro
Party	Candidate	Votes	%	±%
Whig	Edmund Turner	Unopposed		
Conservative	John Ennis Vivian	Unopposed		
Registered electors		622		
Whig hold				
Conservative hold				

General election 1847: Truro
Party	Candidate	Votes	%	±%
Whig	Edmund Turner	Unopposed		
Conservative	John Ennis Vivian	Unopposed		
Registered electors		627		
Whig hold				
Conservative hold				

Turner's death caused a by-election.

By-election, 11 January 1849: Truro
Party	Candidate	Votes	%	±%
Whig	Humphrey Willyams	240	51.7	N/A
Conservative	Montague Edward Smith	224	48.3	N/A
Majority		16	3.4	N/A
Turnout		464	79.2	N/A
Registered electors		586		
Whig hold		Swing	N/A	

=== Elections in the 1850s ===
General election 1852: Truro
Party	Candidate	Votes	%	±%
Whig	Henry Vivian	267	26.3	N/A
Conservative	John Ennis Vivian	263	25.9	N/A
Whig	Augustus Smith	255	25.1	N/A
Conservative	Montague Edward Smith	229	22.6	N/A
Turnout		507 (est)	83.5 (est)	N/A
Registered electors		607		
Majority		4	0.4	N/A
Whig hold		Swing	N/A	
Majority		8	0.8	N/A
Conservative hold		Swing	N/A	

General election 1857: Truro
Party	Candidate	Votes	%	±%
Whig	Augustus Smith	Unopposed		
Whig	Edward Brydges Willyams	Unopposed		
Registered electors		646		
Whig hold				
Whig gain from Conservative				

General election 1859: Truro
Party	Candidate	Votes	%	±%
Conservative	Montague Edward Smith	303	40.9	New
Liberal	Augustus Smith	225	30.4	N/A
Liberal	John Vivian	213	28.7	N/A
Majority		78	10.5	N/A
Turnout		522 (est)	80.7 (est)	N/A
Registered electors		647		
Conservative gain from Liberal		Swing	N/A	
Liberal hold		Swing	N/A	

=== Elections in the 1860s ===
Montague Edward Smith resigned after being appointed a Judge of the Court of Common Pleas, causing a by-election.

By-election, 14 February 1865: Truro
Party	Candidate	Votes	%	±%
Conservative	Frederick Williams	249	53.1	+12.2
Liberal	John Vivian	220	46.9	−12.2
Majority		29	6.2	−4.3
Turnout		469	82.7	+2.0
Registered electors		567		
Conservative hold		Swing	+12.2	

General election 1865: Truro
Party	Candidate	Votes	%	±%
Conservative	Frederick Williams	Unopposed		
Liberal	John Vivian	Unopposed		
Registered electors		567		
Conservative hold				
Liberal hold				

General election 1868: Truro
Party	Candidate	Votes	%	±%
Conservative	Frederick Williams	731	40.2	N/A
Liberal	John Vivian	683	37.5	N/A
Liberal	John Passmore Edwards	406	22.3	N/A
Majority		48	2.7	N/A
Turnout		1,276 (est)	88.9 (est)	N/A
Registered electors		1,435		
Conservative hold		Swing	N/A	
Liberal hold		Swing	N/A	

Vivian was appointed a Lord Commissioner of the Treasury, causing a by-election.

By-election, 21 December 1868: Truro
Party	Candidate	Votes	%	±%
Liberal	John Vivian	Unopposed		
Liberal hold				

=== Elections in the 1870s ===
Vivian resigned after being appointed Under-Secretary of State for War.

By-election, 13 Sep 1871: Truro (1 seat)
Party	Candidate	Votes	%	±%
Conservative	James Hogg	605	58.1	+17.9
Liberal	Edward Jenkins	436	41.9	−17.9
Majority		169	16.2	N/A
Turnout		1,041	72.2	−16.7
Registered electors		1,442		
Conservative gain from Liberal		Swing		

General election 1874: Truro (2 seats)
Party	Candidate	Votes	%	±%
Conservative	Frederick Williams	798	31.4	−8.8
Conservative	James Hogg	723	28.5	N/A
Liberal	Henry Riversdale Grenfell	565	22.2	−15.3
Liberal	Joseph Graham	455	17.9	−5.4
Majority		158	6.3	N/A
Turnout		1,271 (est)	80.3 (est)	−8.6
Registered electors		1,582		
Conservative hold		Swing		
Conservative gain from Liberal		Swing		

Williams' death caused a by-election.

By-election, 26 Sep 1878: Truro (1 seat)
Party	Candidate	Votes	%	±%
Conservative	Arthur Tremayne	656	51.8	−8.1
Liberal	Edward Brydges Willyams	611	48.2	+8.1
Majority		45	3.6	−2.7
Turnout		1,267	80.3	0.0
Registered electors		1,578		
Conservative hold		Swing	−8.1	

=== Elections in the 1880s ===
General election 1880: Truro (2 seats)
Party	Candidate	Votes	%	±%
Conservative	James McGarel-Hogg	781	45.5	+17.0
Liberal	Brydges Willyams	754	43.9	−3.8
Conservative	John Chester	181	10.5	−20.9
Turnout		1,158 (est)	75.1 (est)	−5.2
Registered electors		1,542		
Majority		27	1.6	−4.7
Conservative hold		Swing	+9.5	
Majority		573	33.4	N/A
Liberal gain from Conservative		Swing	+9.5	

General election 1885: Truro
Party	Candidate	Votes	%	±%
Liberal	William Bickford-Smith	3,816	57.0	+13.1
Conservative	William Molesworth-St Aubyn	2,883	43.0	−13.0
Majority		933	14.0	−19.4
Turnout		6,699	75.9	+0.8 (est)
Registered electors		8,825		
Liberal hold		Swing	+13.1	

Thomas Lough

General election 1886: Truro
Party	Candidate	Votes	%	±%
Liberal Unionist	William Bickford-Smith	3,522	69.5	+26.5
Liberal	Thomas Lough	1,546	30.5	−26.5
Majority		1,976	39.0	N/A
Turnout		5,068	57.4	−18.5
Registered electors		8,825		
Liberal Unionist gain from Liberal		Swing	+26.5	

=== Elections in the 1890s ===
General election 1892: Truro
Party	Candidate	Votes	%	±%
Liberal Unionist	John Williams	4,029	61.5	−8.0
Liberal	John Henry Lile	2,518	38.5	+8.0
Majority		1,511	23.0	−16.0
Turnout		6,547	76.5	+19.1
Registered electors		8,556		
Liberal Unionist hold		Swing	-8.0	

General election 1895: Truro
Party	Candidate	Votes	%	±%
Liberal Unionist	Edwin Lawrence	3,282	52.1	−9.4
Liberal	Henry Turner Waddy	3,012	47.9	+9.4
Majority		270	4.2	−18.8
Turnout		6,294	69.5	−7.0
Registered electors		9,057		
Liberal Unionist hold		Swing	-9.4	

=== Elections in the 1900s ===
General election 1900: Truro
Party	Candidate	Votes	%	±%
Liberal Unionist	Edwin Durning-Lawrence	3,869	55.9	+3.8
Liberal	Charles W. Thornton	3,051	44.1	−3.8
Majority		818	11.8	+7.6
Turnout		6,920	74.5	+5.0
Registered electors		9,290		
Liberal Unionist hold		Swing	+3.8	

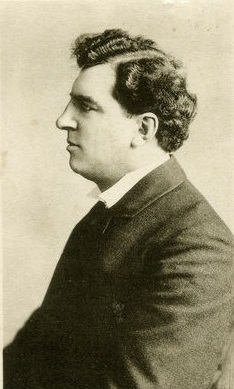
Hay Morgan

General election 1906: Truro
Party	Candidate	Votes	%	±%
Liberal	George Hay Morgan	4,187	53.2	+9.1
Liberal Unionist	Edwin Durning-Lawrence	3,683	46.8	−9.1
Majority		504	6.4	N/A
Turnout		7,870	83.7	+9.2
Registered electors		9,403		
Liberal gain from Liberal Unionist		Swing	+9.1	

=== Elections in the 1910s ===
General election January 1910: Truro
Party	Candidate	Votes	%	±%
Liberal	George Hay Morgan	4,874	53.4	+0.2
Liberal Unionist	Edwin Durning-Lawrence	4,261	46.6	−0.2
Majority		613	6.8	+0.4
Turnout		9,135	89.9	+6.2
Liberal hold		Swing	+0.2	

General election December 1910: Truro
Party	Candidate	Votes	%	±%
Liberal	George Hay Morgan	4,573	52.3	−1.1
Conservative	Charles Williams	4,176	47.7	+1.1
Majority		397	4.6	−2.2
Turnout		8,749	86.1	−3.8
Liberal hold		Swing	-1.1	

General Election 1914/15:

Another General Election was required to take place before the end of 1915. The political parties had been making preparations for an election to take place and by July 1914, the following candidates had been selected;

- Liberal: Walter Burt
- Unionist:

=== Elections in the 1950s ===
General election 1950: Truro
Party	Candidate	Votes	%	±%
Conservative	Geoffrey Wilson	18,910	41.8	
Labour	Henry Brinton	15,617	34.5	
Liberal	Gerald Edward Leaman Whitmarsh	10,746	23.7	
Majority		3,293	7.3	
Turnout		45,273	83.3	
Conservative win (new seat)				

General election 1951: Truro
Party	Candidate	Votes	%	±%
Conservative	Geoffrey Wilson	24,883	55.7	+13.9
Labour	John N. Newby	19,752	44.2	+9.7
Majority		5,131	11.5	+4.2
Turnout		44,635	81.2	−2.1
Conservative hold		Swing	+2.1	

General election 1955: Truro
Party	Candidate	Votes	%	±%
Conservative	Geoffrey Wilson	19,900	46.1	−9.6
Labour	John N. Newby	15,183	35.2	−9.0
Liberal	Nancy Seear	8,056	18.7	New
Majority		4,717	10.9	−0.6
Turnout		43,139	78.7	−2.5
Conservative hold		Swing	-0.3	

General election 1959: Truro
Party	Candidate	Votes	%	±%
Conservative	Geoffrey Wilson	19,544	44.2	−1.9
Labour	Ronald James Rae Blindell	15,057	34.0	−1.2
Liberal	Nancy Seear	9,637	21.8	+3.1
Majority		4,487	10.2	−0.7
Turnout		44,238	80.2	+1.5
Conservative hold		Swing	-0.4	

=== Elections in the 1960s ===
General election 1964: Truro
Party	Candidate	Votes	%	±%
Conservative	Geoffrey Wilson	18,328	40.6	−3.6
Labour	Douglas W. J. Grazier	14,224	31.5	−2.5
Liberal	William Rowse Hosking	12,575	27.9	+8.1
Majority		4,104	9.1	−1.1
Turnout		45,127	79.2	−1.0
Conservative hold		Swing	-0.5	

General election 1966: Truro
Party	Candidate	Votes	%	±%
Conservative	Geoffrey Wilson	18,701	40.4	−0.2
Labour	Reginald Cyril J. Scott	17,093	37.0	+5.5
Liberal	William Rowse Hosking	10,450	22.6	−5.3
Majority		1,608	3.4	−5.7
Turnout		46,244	79.2	0.0
Conservative hold		Swing	-2.8	

=== Elections in the 1970s ===
General election 1970: Truro
Party	Candidate	Votes	%	±%
Conservative	Piers Dixon	24,894	49.3	+8.9
Labour	Raymond Charles Cuss	16,684	33.0	−4.0
Liberal	Michael Steed	8,923	17.7	−4.9
Majority		8,210	16.3	+12.9
Turnout		50,501	76.0	−3.2
Conservative hold		Swing	+6.4	

General election February 1974: Truro
Party	Candidate	Votes	%	±%
Conservative	Piers Dixon	23,493	40.3	−9.0
Liberal	David Penhaligon	20,932	35.9	+18.2
Labour	M. W. White	12,945	22.2	−10.8
Mebyon Kernow	James Whetter	850	1.5	New
Majority		2,561	4.4	−11.9
Turnout		58,220	81.5	+5.5
Conservative hold		Swing	-13.6	

General election October 1974: Truro
Party	Candidate	Votes	%	±%
Liberal	David Penhaligon	22,549	39.8	+3.9
Conservative	Piers Dixon	22,085	39.0	−1.3
Labour	A. F. Long	11,606	20.5	−1.7
Mebyon Kernow	James Whetter	384	0.7	−0.8
Majority		464	0.8	New
Turnout		56,624	78.6	−2.9
Liberal gain from Conservative		Swing	+2.6	

General election 1979: Truro
Party	Candidate	Votes	%	±%
Liberal	David Penhaligon	33,571	52.8	+13.0
Conservative	R. A. Brown	24,863	39.1	+0.1
Labour	Bruce Malcolm Tidy	4,689	7.4	−13.1
Cornish Nationalist	James Whetter	227	0.4	−0.3
National Front	N. F. Hedger	182	0.3	New
Majority		8,708	13.7	+12.9
Turnout		63,532	82.9	+4.3
Liberal hold		Swing	+6.4	

=== Elections in the 1980s ===
General election 1983: Truro
Party	Candidate	Votes	%	±%
Liberal	David Penhaligon	31,279	57.3	+4.5
Conservative	Philip Darren Buddell	20,799	38.1	−1.0
Labour	Janet Mary Beecroft	2,479	4.6	−2.8
Majority		10,480	19.2	+5.5
Turnout		54,447	79.6	−3.3
Liberal hold		Swing	+2.8	

By-election 1987: Truro
Party	Candidate	Votes	%	±%
Liberal	Matthew Owen John Taylor	30,599	60.4	+3.1
Conservative	Nick St. Aubyn	15,982	31.5	−6.6
Labour	John King	3,603	7.1	+2.5
Green	Howard Hoptrough	403	0.8	New
Death off Road: Freight on Rail	Helen Anscomb	75	0.1	New
Majority		14,617	28.9	+9.7
Turnout		50,662	70.2	−9.4
Liberal hold		Swing	+4.8	

General election 1987: Truro
Party	Candidate	Votes	%	±%
Liberal	Matthew Owen John Taylor	28,368	49.0	−8.3
Conservative	Nick St Aubyn	23,615	40.8	+2.7
Labour	John King	5,882	10.2	+5.6
Majority		4,753	8.2	−11.0
Turnout		57,865	79.9	+0.3
Liberal hold		Swing	-5.5	

=== Elections in the 1990s ===
General election 1992: Truro
Party	Candidate	Votes	%	±%
Liberal Democrats	Matthew Taylor	31,230	50.5	+1.5
Conservative	Nick St Aubyn	23,660	38.3	−2.5
Labour	James H. Geach	6,078	9.8	−0.4
Green	Liam Keating	569	0.9	New
Liberal	Christopher Tankard	208	0.3	New
Natural Law	Margot Hartley	108	0.2	New
Majority		7,570	12.2	+4.0
Turnout		61,853	82.3	+2.4
Liberal Democrats hold		Swing	+2.0	

== See also ==
- Parliamentary constituencies in Cornwall

== Sources ==
- Willis, Browne (1750). Notitia Parliamentaria, Part II: A Series or Lists of the Representatives in the several Parliaments held from the Reformation 1541, to the Restoration 1660 ... London. pp. 25, 47, 71, 177.
