= Robert Cheeseman =

16th-century English politician

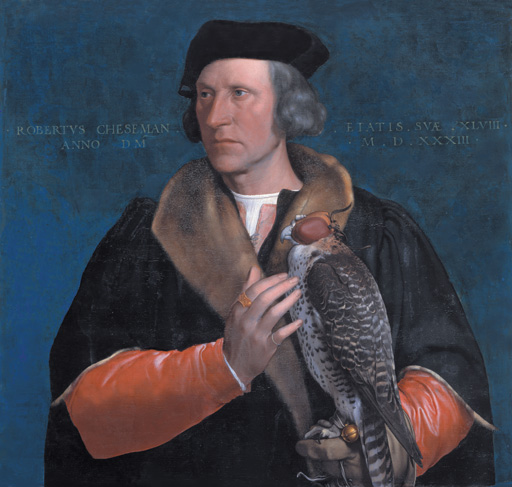
Portrait with falcon by Hans Holbein the Younger (1533).

Robert Cheeseman or Cheseman (1485–1547) was an English politician. He was the Member of Parliament (MP) for Middlesex, 28 April 1539 – 24 July 1540.

== Life ==
He was born in 1485, son and heir of Edward Cheeseman, Cofferer and Keeper of the Wardrobe to Henry VII, and succeeded to the family estates in 1517. He was made a Justice of the Peace for Middlesex in 1528, and served on a number of commissions for collecting tithes and subsidies, and so on. It is sometimes stated that he was Chief Falconer to Henry VIII, but there is no documentary evidence for this and the belief apparently derives from the fact that the famous portrait of him by Holbein now in the Mauritshuis shows him with a falcon on his wrist.

In 1530 he was one of the commissioners on an inquiry into the possessions of Thomas Wolsey after he was attainted, and was on the Grand Jury at the trials of Sir Geoffrey Pole and others (1538), and Thomas Culpeper and Francis Dereham for treason (1541). He was one of the gentlemen selected to welcome Anne of Cleves when she first landed in England. In 1536 he supplied thirty men for the army against the Northern rebels of the Pilgrimage of Grace. He married Alice, daughter of Henry Dacres, of Mayfield, Staffordshire, a Merchant Tailor and Alderman of London. He was married a second time to Eleanor Owlett 5 May 1523 Saint Andrews Baynard Castle, London. Together they had five children John, Robert, Eleanor, Anne and Raaf all born in Bedfordshire, England.

At his death he held the neighbouring manors of Southall and Norwood, Middlesex (now Greater London). A monument was placed in Norwood chapel.
