= Foot (surname) =

Foot is a surname. Notable people with the surname include:

- Caroline Foot (born 1965), British former swimmer
- David Foot (journalist) (1929–2021), English journalist
- David Foot, Canadian economist
- Dingle Foot (1905–1978), British lawyer and politician
- Ernest Foot (1895–1923), English World War I flying ace
- Henry Foot (1805–1857), English-born Australian cricketer
- Hugh Foot, Baron Caradon (1907–1990), British colonial administrator and diplomat
- Isaac Foot (1880–1960), British Liberal politician and solicitor
- John Foot, Baron Foot (1909–1999), British Liberal Party politician
- John Foot (historian) (born 1964), British historian specialising in Italy
- Mandy Foot, Australian children's picture book writer and illustrator
- Michael Foot (1913–2010), British politician and journalist, Labour Party leader (1980–83)
- M. R. D. Foot (1919–2012), British historian
- Oliver Foot (1946–2008), British actor and philanthropist
- Paul Foot (journalist) (1937–2004), British investigative journalist, political campaigner and author
- Paul Foot (comedian) (born 1973), English comedian
- Philippa Foot (1920–2010), British philosopher
- Robert Foot (1889–1973), director general of the BBC (1942–1944)
- Samuel A. Foot (1780–1846), U.S. representative and senator
- Sarah Foot (journalist) (1939–2015), British journalist and author
- Sarah Foot (born 1961), British historian
- Solomon Foot (1802–1866), lawyer and senator from Vermont
- Victorine Foot (1920–2000), British painter
