= The Foot =

The Foot can refer to:

- An episode of the first season of Six Feet Under.
- The Foot Clan of Teenage Mutant Ninja Turtles.
- The Foot Book
- The Foot of Cupid
- The Foot can refer to the 4 Grey Goose Bottles that are blocked on a back bar.
- The Foot. (band)
- The Foot, a movie that was in Diary of a Wimpy Kid: Rodrick Rules from the theatrical and DVD versions

== See also ==
- Foot in anatomy
- Foot (disambiguation)
