= Frederick Poole =

British Army officer (1869–1936)

Major-General Sir Frederick Poole KBE CB CMG DSO DL
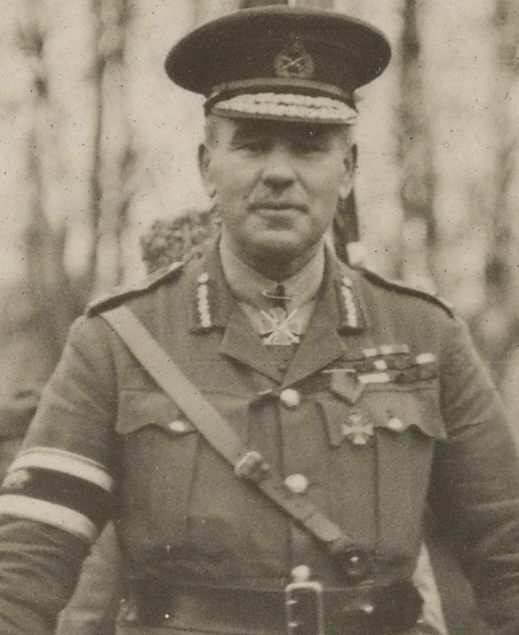
- Born: 3 August 1869
- Died: 20 December 1936 (aged 67); St Austell, Cornwall, England
- Military career
- Allegiance: United Kingdom
- Branch: British Army
- Service years: 1889–1914; 1914–1920
- Rank: Major-General
- Commands: British North Russia Expeditionary Force
- Conflicts: Tirah campaign Second Boer War; Dervish War; First World War; North Russia Intervention
- Awards: Knight Commander of the Order of the British Empire; Companion of the Order of the Bath; Companion of the Order of St Michael and St George; Distinguished Service Order; Mentioned in Despatches; Legion of Honour (France)

Major-General Sir Frederick Cuthbert Poole, KBE, CB, CMG, DSO, DL (3 August 1869 – 20 December 1936) was a British Army officer of the First World War and a Conservative parliamentary candidate.

== Career ==
Poole attended the Royal Military Academy, Woolwich and was commissioned into the Royal Artillery in February 1889. He was promoted to lieutenant on 15 February 1892, and served in the Tirah campaign in India from 1897 to 1898. Promotion to captain followed on 14 June 1899. Poole served in the Second Boer War in South Africa, for which he left on the SS British Prince in March 1900. He was attached to the ammunition column of the 8th Division, and was later in command of P Section Pom-poms, and was present at the engagements at Botha′s Pass, the storming of Alleman′s Nek (June 1900), the Battle of Bergendal and operations near Lydenburg (August 1900). For his service, he was twice mentioned in despatches (including the final despatch by Lord Kitchener dated 23 June 1902), and was awarded the Distinguished Service Order (DSO).

Following the end of the war, Poole left Cape Town for England on the SS Simla in July 1902. In January 1904 he was seconded to serve with the Somaliland Field Force and participated in the Dervish War. He then saw action in Northern Nigeria in 1904 and was promoted to captain from supernumerary captain in September 1906 and then, after being seconded for service as adjutant of a militia unit in March 1907, to major in 1909. He retired from the army early in 1914.

Poole was recalled to service following the outbreak of the First World War in August 1914. He became a lieutenant colonel in 1915, and was promoted to temporary major general, dated 26 May 1917. That same year he was made a Companion of the Order of St Michael and St George, and was made a Companion of the Order of the Bath in 1918. Having spent two years in Russia previously, he served as General Officer Commanding, North Russia Expeditionary Force between 1918 and 1919, and was made a Knight Commander of the Order of the British Empire in 1919. Poole retired as an honorary major general in 1920. Poole was honoured by several foreign governments during his military career, including being made a member of the French Legion of Honour (Officer) in 1916, the Russian Imperial Order of Saint Stanislaus (First Class) and Order of St. Vladimir (Third Class) in 1918, and the Romanian Order of the Crown (Officer) in 1918.

He stood as the Conservative candidate in the 1922 Bodmin by-election, but was defeated by Isaac Foot. He stood again for the seat in the 1922 and 1923 general elections, but was defeated by the incumbent on both occasions. He was a Deputy Lieutenant for Cornwall.

== Bibliography ==
- Poole, Henry (2023). General Sir Frederick Poole. Troubador Publishing. ISBN 978-1803136073.
