= 1922 Bodmin by-election =

UK parliamentary by-election

- 23 February 1922
- Registered: 32,578
- Turnout: 74.8%
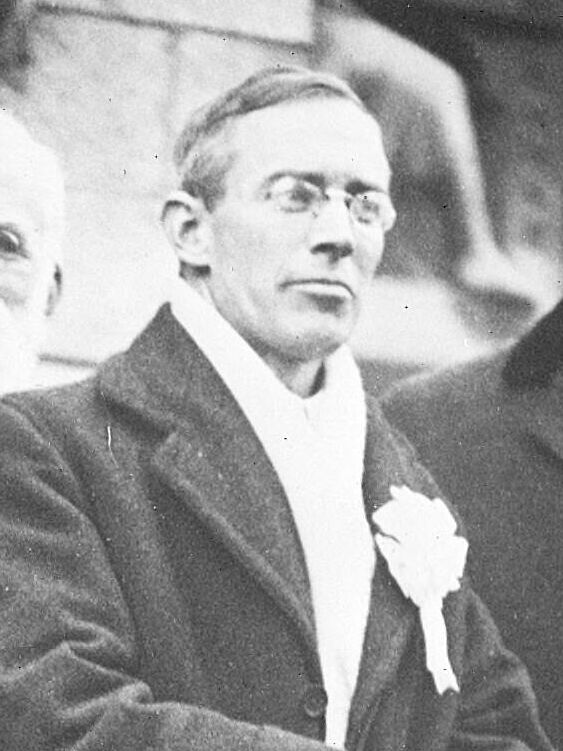

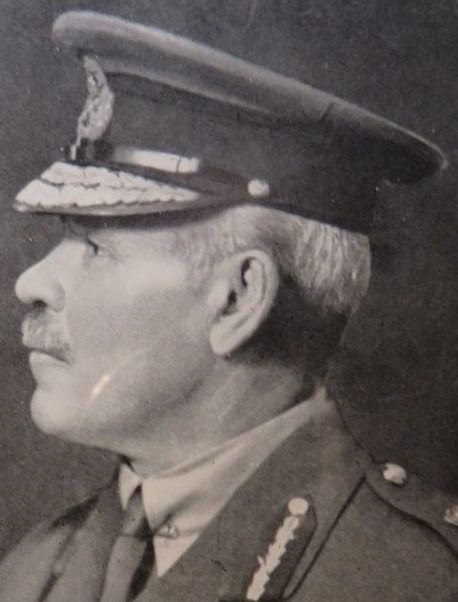
Candidate	Isaac Foot	Frederick Poole
Party	Liberal	Unionist
Alliance	Labour	Coalition
Popular vote	13,751	10,610
Percentage	56.4%	43.6%
Swing	▲14.8%	▼14.8%
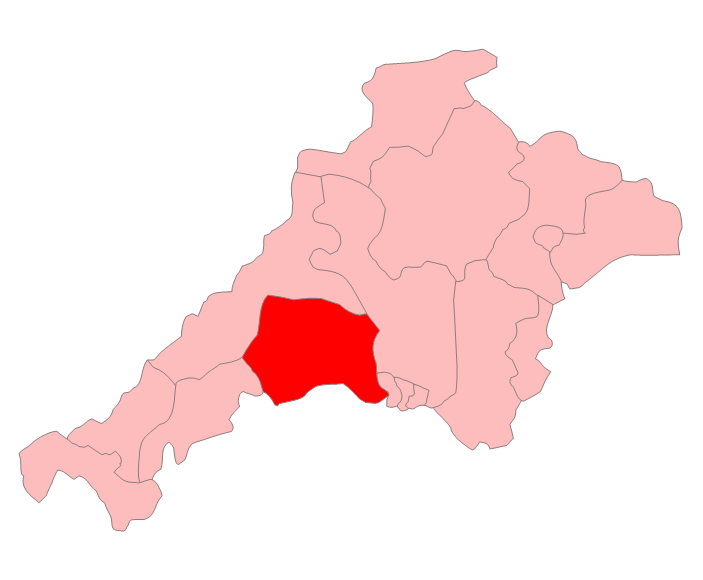
MP before election
Charles Hanson
Unionist
Subsequent MP
Isaac Foot
Liberal

The 1922 Bodmin by-election was a parliamentary by-election for the British House of Commons. The constituency of Bodmin in Cornwall polled on 23 February 1922. The by-election was notable for the opposition Liberal Party gaining a seat from the Coalition-supporting Conservative Party.

== Vacancy ==
The by-election was caused by the death of the sitting Coalition Conservative MP, Sir Charles Hanson on 17 January 1922. Hanson had been MP for Bodmin since himself winning the seat in a by-election on 15 August 1916.

== Electoral history ==
The constituency was a traditional Unionist/Liberal marginal. The last Liberal win came in January 1910. In December 1910 a Liberal Unionist narrowly gained the seat. In 1918 the Coalition Government of Lloyd George chose to endorse the incumbent Unionist candidate. The result at the general election in 1918 was;

1918 general election: Bodmin
Party		Candidate	Votes	%	±%
C	Unionist	Charles Hanson	12,228	58.4	+8.2
	Liberal	Isaac Foot	8,705	41.6	−8.2
Majority			3,523	16.8	+16.4
Turnout			20,933	69.1	−17.5
Registered electors			30,279		
	Unionist hold		Swing	+8.2	
C indicates candidate endorsed by the coalition government.

== Candidates ==
- The Bodmin Unionists had already selected Major-General Frederick Poole as the Coalition candidate to replace Sir Charles Hanson who had indicated he was standing down at the next election. Poole was Hanson's son-in-law. Poole has usually been described as a Coalition Conservative but The Times newspaper did refer to him as a Coalition Liberal in its report on the by-election polling day.
- The Bodmin Liberals re-adopted 41-year-old Plymouth solicitor Isaac Foot who had fought Bodmin twice before, including at the last election. He had also stood as Liberal candidate in the 1919 Plymouth Sutton by-election when he was beaten by Nancy Astor. Foot was seen as a direct opponent of Lloyd George.
- The Labour Party had never before contested Bodmin and did not put forward a candidate this time.

== Campaign ==
The Coalition campaigned on its record of winning the war and negotiating the peace, appealing to the electorate for a mandate continue steering the country through difficult domestic and international challenges. Sir Austen Chamberlain, in a letter to General Poole, asked for the support of the electors for the giving of peace to Ireland and the restoration of that economic and financial stability necessary for good trade and prosperity. Poole was supported by almost all the local press except the previously pro-Coalition Western Morning News, which had supported Foot due to the Coalition government's "reckless expenditure."

For the Independent Liberals, Foot attacked the government's record in waste and inefficiency. He said that the electorate had recognized the 1918 general election as a fraud and resented having been tricked by 'delusive promises' and 'crooked politics'. As well as being endorsed by the Western Morning News, Foot gained the formal support of the constituency Labour Party and was supported by Arthur Quiller-Couch, who served as one of his nominators.

The campaign also took on a distinctly Cornish aspect: there was significant local disillusion over the perceived failure of the government to support the Cornish tin mining industry after the war. An election song at the time had the lines "The Coalition would not help the miners poor", sung to the tune of Trelawny.

=== Lib-Lab co-operation ===
One question which was raised during the round of by-elections being fought at this time, as the date of the next general election neared, was if there was some kind of electoral arrangement between the Asquithian Liberals and the Labour Party. Foot had no Labour opponent in Bodmin but Labour had not contested the seat at the 1918 general election either. The executive committee of the Labour Party in Bodmin did however issue a strong attack on the government's record, especially what it described as 'its wanton waste of the country's resources' and it recommended that Labour supporters should vote for Foot. The endorsement led Poole's campaign to try and paint Foot as a radical socialist and the constituency party to later be censured by the national party. The local Labour Party's active help during Foot's campaign caused the Cornish Times to say that he had "the open blessing of the Socialists".

By-elections were taking place at Manchester Clayton, Camberwell North and Wolverhampton West in this period as well as at Bodmin. In the other three seats the Independent Liberals did not stand candidates, allowing Labour to take on the Coalition in straight fights with the result that Manchester and Wolverhampton were Labour gains. The Coalition leadership regarded this as evidence that understandings, formal or unofficial, were being entered into by the opposition parties in anticipation of a similar but formal arrangement for the next general election, but that was denied by Labour and Liberal spokesmen. The Times tended to accept these denials, given the difficulty of imposing national arrangements on independently minded local Liberal and Labour constituency organisations, but clearly it was then in the interests of the opposition parties to avoid fighting each other as far as possible, as it made it easier to for the government candidate to win.

== Result ==
The by-election turnout was up on the last general election. The result was a gain for the Liberal Party from the Coalition Unionist. Foot obtained a swing of 14.8%.

Bodmin by-election, 1922: Bodmin
Party		Candidate	Votes	%	±%
	Liberal (Labour)	Isaac Foot	13,751	56.4	+14.8
C	Unionist	Frederick Poole	10,610	43.6	−14.8
Majority			3.141	12.8	N/A
Turnout			24,361	74.8	+5.7
Registered electors			32,578		
	Liberal gain from Unionist		Swing	+14.8	
C indicates candidate endorsed by the coalition government.

The size of the Liberal victory has been described by one historian as a 'landslide'. The result was said to have turned the tide for the Liberals in the region restoring the party as the true heir of the old Radical tradition and that as a result Cornish Methodism now had a charismatic spokesman at Westminster.

== Aftermath ==
Foot and Poole were to face off again at the general election later in the year. On this occasion Foot again won, though his majority was halved;

General election, 1922: Bodmin
Party	Candidate	Votes	%	±%
Liberal	Isaac Foot	14,292	53.4	+11.8
Conservative	Frederick Poole	12,467	46.6	–11.8
Majority		1,825	6.8	−6.0
Turnout		26,759	80.4	+5.6
Registered electors		33,265		
Liberal gain from Unionist		Swing	+11.8	

== See also ==
- List of United Kingdom by-elections
- United Kingdom by-election records
