= One Foot =

One Foot or one foot may refer to:

- a single Foot (unit)
- Unipedalism, the condition of having only leg or one foot.
- "One Foot", a variation of an ollie (skateboarding) trick
- "One Foot" (Walk the Moon song), by American rock band Walk the Moon from their 2017 album, What If Nothing
- "One Foot", by American band Fun on their 2012 album, Some Nights

== See also ==
- One Foot in the Grave, a British sitcom
- One Foot in Front of the Other (disambiguation)
- Foot (disambiguation)
