= Footsbarn Theatre =

Footsbarn Theatre is a British touring theatre company established in Cornwall in 1971.

== History ==
Footsbarn started life in London in 1970 at the Drama Studio. It was created by Oliver Foot and Andrew Simon, who met at the Drama Studio in 1968. They worked on a production of Samuel Beckett's Endgame. It began as a student production supervised by Peter Layton at the Putney Institute. Endgame was reprised in October 1970.

The first Footsbarn production was at the St Mary Abbot Theatre in Kensington. The Foot family had no connection with the Cornish barn that the company moved to in 1971 near the village of Trewidland. The name Footsbarn was first referred to in the London Evening Standard when Oliver announced his marriage, despite reservations over the name by his Brother, Paul an investigative reporter with Private Eye who didn’t want the family name involved in the title and Andrew’s own reservations about the use of Barn in the title.

Endgame put down the marker for Footsbarn's distinctive style. Ian Watson of South West Arts, Alan Ayckbourn's biographer, said it was the best piece of theatre he'd experienced. It was the reason why Footsbarn were given their original grant; without Mr Beckett's play, Footsbarn would not exist.

The ensemble played in various British venues, including the 1979 Glastonbury Festival.

"Footsbarn Travelling Theatre" left Britain in 1981 to tour the world. The company has produced more than 60 plays and have travelled to all six continents.

In 1991, the troupe bought a farm called "La Chaussée" in the Allier department of the Auvergne in Central France and have since based their work there. Footsbarn performs in a custom built Theatre Tent. "La Chaussée" is Footsbarn's production centre with studios, rehearsal spaces and offices. Public workshops and performances are presented throughout the year. As of 2025, the troupe have continued to perform.
