= Gerald Joseph Cuthbert Harrison =

British politician (1895–1954)

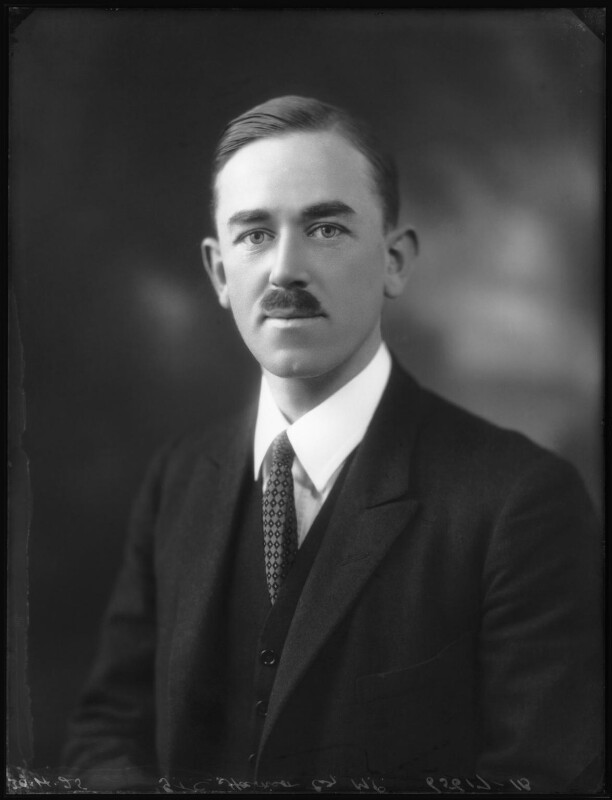
Harrison in 1925

Gerald Joseph Cuthbert Harrison (1895 – 6 December 1954) was Conservative MP for Bodmin.

Harrison was educated at Charterhouse School and Exeter College, Oxford. During the First World War, he was commissioned into the Royal Field Artillery and saw service with the 3rd Lowland Brigade, 52nd Lowland Division and with Egyptian Expeditionary Force in Sinai, Palestine, and Syria. He was demobilized in 1919 with the rank of captain.

He was elected for Bodmin in 1924, taking the seat from the Liberal Isaac Foot. From 1926 to 1929, he was Parliamentary Private Secretary to the First Lord of the Admiralty. He was defeated by Foot at the 1929 general election.

Harrison was High Sheriff of Cumberland for 1945–46 and Deputy Lieutenant for Cumberland from 1953.

Parliament of the United Kingdom
Preceded by Isaac Foot	Member of Parliament for Bodmin; 1924–1929	Succeeded by Isaac Foot

== Sources ==
- "Mr. G. J. C. Harrison". The Times. 7 December 1954. p. 10.
- Craig, F. W. S. (1983) [1969]. British parliamentary election results 1918–1949 (3rd ed.). Chichester: Parliamentary Research Services. ISBN 0-900178-06-X.
