= John Foot, Baron Foot =

British politician (1909–1999)

The Right Honourable The Lord Foot
- Lord Foot, 1967

Personal details
- Born: John Mackintosh Foot; 17 February 1909 Callington, Cornwall
- Died: 11 October 1999 (aged 90)
- Party: Liberal Democrats; Liberal (before 1988)
- Spouse: Anne Bailey Farr (m. 1936)
- Children: 2
- Parents: Isaac Foot (father); Eva Mackintosh (mother)
- Relatives: Dingle Foot (brother); The Lord Caradon (brother); Michael Foot (brother); Paul Foot (nephew); Sarah Foot (niece); Oliver Foot (nephew)
- Education: Balliol College, Oxford

Military service
- Allegiance: United Kingdom
- Branch/service: British Army
- Years of service: 1939–1945
- Unit: 43rd (Wessex) Infantry Division; 21st Army Group
- Battles/wars: World War II

John Mackintosh Foot, Baron Foot (17 February 1909 – 11 October 1999) was a British Liberal politician and life peer.

== Family ==
John Foot was born at Pencrebar, Callington, Cornwall, the third son of Isaac Foot (1880–1960) and his wife Eva Mackintosh (died 1946). His father was a solicitor and founder of the Plymouth law firm of Foot and Bowden. Isaac was also an active member of the Liberal Party, the Liberal MP for Bodmin before World War II and the Lord Mayor of Plymouth after the war. His elder siblings were barrister Sir Dingle Foot, QC (1905–1978), who subsequently became both a Liberal and Labour MP and Hugh Foot, Baron Caradon (1907–1990), who became Governor of Cyprus (1957–1960) and then the UK representative to the United Nations (1964–1970). His younger siblings were Margaret Elizabeth Foot (1911–1965), Michael Foot (1913–2010), a Labour MP, Cabinet Minister and Leader of the Opposition (1980–1983), Jennifer Mackintosh Highet (1916-2002) and Christopher Isaac Foot (1917-1984).

He married an American, Anne (Bailey Farr) in 1936 and they had a son and a daughter.

== Early life ==
He was educated at Forres School, Swanage and then Bembridge School on the Isle of Wight. He went on to read jurisprudence at Balliol College, Oxford, where he was President of the Oxford Union in 1931, following in the steps of his elder brother Dingle (1928) and preceding his younger brother Michael (1933). After graduation he joined the family law firm before serving in the Wessex Division, reaching the rank of Major, and also on the HQ Staff of the 21st Army Group during World War II. After the war he rejoined the family law firm and subsequently became the senior partner there following the death of his father in 1960.

== Political career ==
Foot was considered by brother Michael as the best orator and the "ablest member of the family". He first stood as a Liberal candidate in a 1934 by-election, in the safe Conservative seat of Basingstoke, and ran again there in the 1935 general election. In both the 1945 and 1950 elections, he stood in Bodmin, being defeated by the Conservative Sir Douglas Marshall on both occasions. He remained in the Liberal Party during the long period of its post-war decline and was subsequently made a life peer on 29 November 1967 as Baron Foot, of Buckland Monachorum in the County of Devon.

He served as Chairman of the UK Immigrants Advisory Service from 1970 to 1978 where he did not hesitate to criticise the Wilson Government for the inadequate fulfilment of their pledges to the persecuted Kenyan and Ugandan Asians. He was also a robust environmental defender of Dartmoor against the expansionist ambitions of Plymouth Council. He was a patron of Humanists UK until his death.

== Death ==
He died aged 90 on 11 October 1999, survived by his wife and children.

== Arms ==
Coat of arms of John Foot, Baron Foot
Crest Perching on a tower Sable supported by two lions' gambs erect Gules. Escutcheon Or on a chevron engrailed Sable between three lions gambs erect and erased Gules three wheels Or. Supporters Dexter a buck, sinister a Dartmoor pony, each gorged with a wreath of yew Proper and supporting between the legs a sword erect sheathed Or the whole upon a compartment of rock in the middle thereof a pit Proper. Motto Pro Lege Et Libertate (For Law And Liberty)
