= Michael Foot =

British politician (1913–2010)

The Right Honourable Michael Foot FRSL
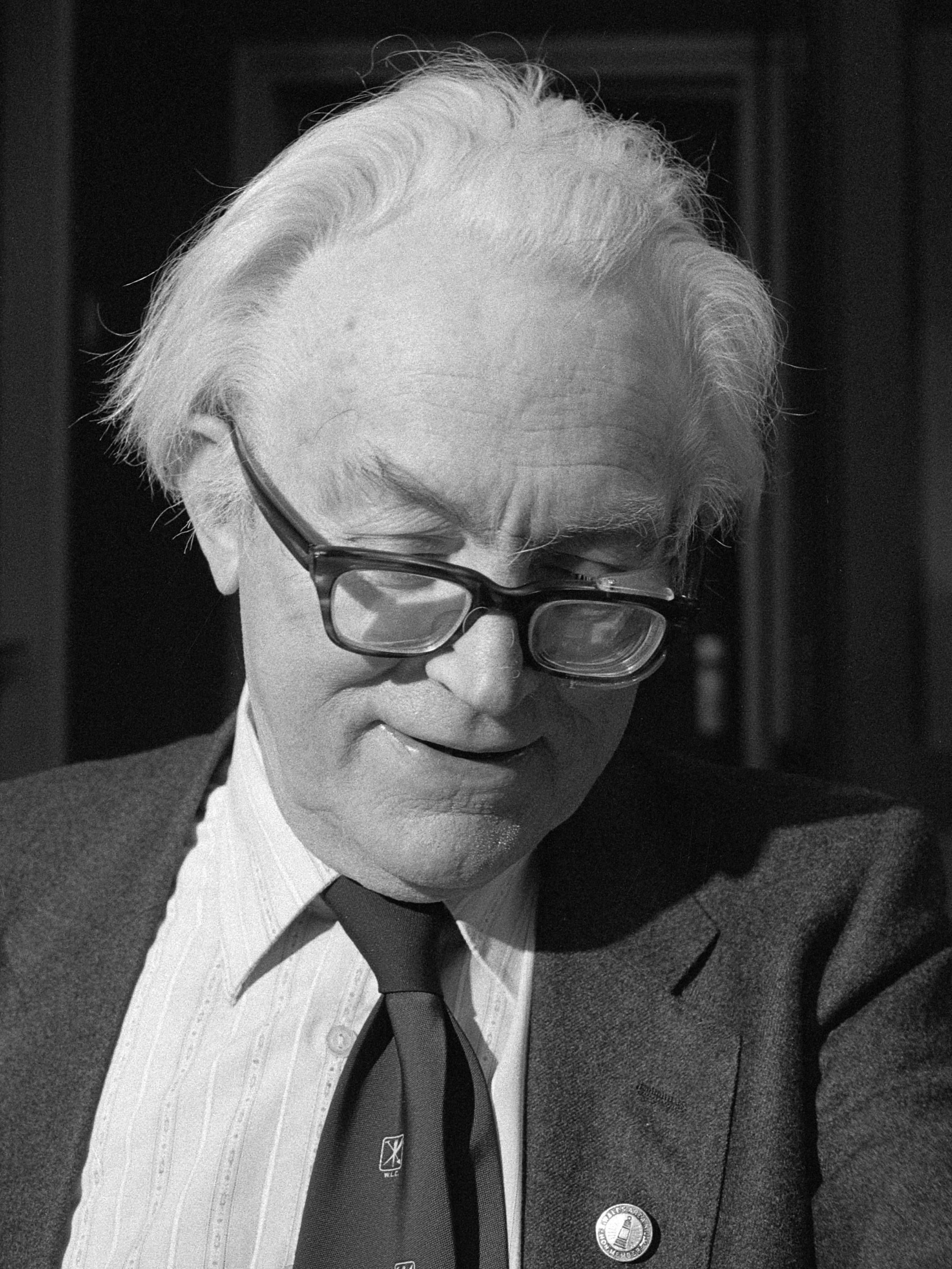
- Foot in 1981

Leader of the Opposition
- In office 10 November 1980 – 2 October 1983
- Monarch: Elizabeth II
- Prime Minister: Margaret Thatcher
- Preceded by: James Callaghan
- Succeeded by: Neil Kinnock

Leader of the Labour Party
- In office 10 November 1980 – 2 October 1983
- Deputy: Denis Healey
- Preceded by: James Callaghan
- Succeeded by: Neil Kinnock

Deputy Leader of the Labour Party
- In office 5 April 1976 – 10 November 1980
- Leader: James Callaghan
- Preceded by: Edward Short
- Succeeded by: Denis Healey

Shadow Leader of the House of Commons
- In office 4 May 1979 – 10 November 1980
- Leader: James Callaghan
- Preceded by: Norman St John-Stevas
- Succeeded by: John Silkin
Ministerial offices
Leader of the House of Commons
In office 8 April 1976 – 4 May 1979
Prime Minister	James Callaghan
Preceded by	Edward Short
Succeeded by	Norman St John-Stevas
Lord President of the Council
In office 8 April 1976 – 4 May 1979
Prime Minister	James Callaghan
Preceded by	Edward Short
Succeeded by	Christopher Soames
Secretary of State for Employment
In office 5 March 1974 – 8 April 1976
Prime Minister	Harold Wilson
Preceded by	William Whitelaw
Succeeded by	Albert Booth
Parliamentary offices
Member of Parliament for Blaenau Gwent Ebbw Vale (1960–1983)
In office 17 November 1960 – 16 March 1992
Preceded by	Aneurin Bevan
Succeeded by	Llew Smith
Member of Parliament for Plymouth Devonport
In office 5 July 1945 – 6 May 1955
Preceded by	Leslie Hore-Belisha
Succeeded by	Joan Vickers

Personal details
- Born: Michael Mackintosh Foot; 23 July 1913 Plymouth, Devon, England
- Died: 3 March 2010 (aged 96) Hampstead, London, England
- Resting place: Golders Green Crematorium, London
- Party: Labour
- Spouse: Jill Craigie (m. 1949; died 1999)
- Parents: Isaac Foot (father); Eva Mackintosh (mother)
- Relatives: Sir Dingle Foot (brother); The Lord Caradon (brother); The Lord Foot (brother); Paul Foot (nephew); Sarah Foot (niece); Oliver Foot (nephew)
- Education: Wadham College, Oxford (BA)

Michael Mackintosh Foot (23 July 1913 – 3 March 2010) was a British politician who was Leader of the Labour Party and Leader of the Opposition from 1980 to 1983. Foot began his career as a journalist on Tribune and the Evening Standard. He co-wrote the 1940 polemic against appeasement of Adolf Hitler, Guilty Men, under a pseudonym.

Foot was a Member of Parliament (MP) for some 42 years, from 1945 to 1955 and 1960 to 1992. A passionate orator, and associated with the left wing of the Labour Party for most of his career, Foot was an ardent supporter of the Campaign for Nuclear Disarmament (CND) and of British withdrawal from the European Economic Community (EEC). He was appointed to Harold Wilson's Cabinet as Employment Secretary in 1974, and he later was Leader of the House of Commons from 1976 to 1979 under James Callaghan. He was also Deputy Leader of the Labour Party under Callaghan from 1976 to 1980.

Elected as a compromise candidate, Foot served as Labour leader and Leader of the Opposition from 1980 to 1983. Not particularly telegenic, he was nicknamed "Worzel Gummidge" for his rumpled appearance. A faction of the party broke away in 1981 to form the Social Democratic Party (SDP). Foot led Labour into the 1983 general election, when the party obtained its lowest share of the vote in 65 years and the fewest parliamentary seats since 1935, which remained the case until Labour's defeat at the 2019 general election. He resigned the party leadership following the election, and was succeeded as leader by Neil Kinnock.

== Family ==
Foot was born in Lipson Terrace, Plymouth, Devon, the fourth son and fifth of seven children of Isaac Foot (1880–1960) and of the Scotswoman Eva Mackintosh (1877–1946). Isaac Foot was a solicitor and founder of the Plymouth law firm Foot and Bowden (which amalgamated with another firm to become Foot Anstey). Isaac Foot, an active member of the Liberal Party, served as the Liberal Member of Parliament for Bodmin in Cornwall from 1922 to 1924 and again from 1929 to 1935, and as a Lord Mayor of Plymouth.

Michael Foot's siblings included: Sir Dingle Foot MP (1905–78), a Liberal and subsequently Labour MP; Hugh Foot, Baron Caradon (1907–90), Governor of Cyprus (1957–60) and representative of the United Kingdom at the United Nations from 1964 to 1970; Liberal politician John Foot, later Baron Foot (1909–99); Margaret Elizabeth Foot (1911–65); Jennifer Mackintosh Highet (1916–2002); and Christopher Isaac Foot (1917–84). Michael Foot was the uncle of campaigning journalist Paul Foot (1937–2004) and of charity worker Oliver Foot (1946–2008).

== Early life ==
Foot was educated at Plymouth College Preparatory School, Forres School in Swanage, and Leighton Park School in Reading. When he left Forres School, the headmaster sent a letter to his father in which he said "he has been the leading boy in the school in every way". He then went on to read Philosophy, Politics and Economics at Wadham College, Oxford. Foot was a president of the Oxford Union. He also took part in the ESU USA Tour (the debating tour of the United States run by the English-Speaking Union).

Upon graduating with a second-class degree in 1934, he took a job as a shipping clerk in Birkenhead. Foot was profoundly influenced by the poverty and unemployment that he witnessed in Liverpool, which was on a different scale from anything he had seen in Plymouth. A Liberal up to this time, Foot was converted to socialism by Oxford University Labour Club president David Lewis, a Canadian Rhodes scholar, and others: "I knew him [at Oxford] when I was a Liberal [and Lewis] played a part in converting me to socialism."

Foot joined the Labour Party and first stood for parliament, aged 22, at the 1935 general election, where he contested Monmouth. During the election, Foot criticised the Prime Minister, Stanley Baldwin, for seeking rearmament. In his election address, Foot contended that "the armaments race in Europe must be stopped now". Foot also supported unilateral disarmament, after multilateral disarmament talks at Geneva had broken down in 1933.

Foot became a journalist, working briefly on the New Statesman, before joining the left-wing weekly Tribune when it was set up in early 1937 to support the Unity Campaign, an attempt to secure an anti-fascist united front between Labour and other left-wing parties. The campaign's members were Stafford Cripps's (Labour-affiliated) Socialist League, the Independent Labour Party and the Communist Party of Great Britain (CP). Foot resigned in 1938 after the paper's first editor, William Mellor, was sacked for refusing to adopt a new CP policy of backing a Popular Front, including non-socialist parties, against fascism and appeasement. In a 1955 interview, Foot ideologically identified as a libertarian socialist.

He was an avid anti-imperialist and was heavily involved in the India League. As an Oxford graduate, he was influenced by the founder of the India League, Krishna Menon. The India League was the premier UK-based organisation that fought for the 'Liberation of India'. After Indian independence in 1947, Foot's interest in India continued, and he became Chair of the India League.

== Journalism ==
On the recommendation of Aneurin Bevan, Foot was soon hired by Lord Beaverbrook to work as a writer on his Evening Standard. (Bevan is supposed to have told Beaverbrook on the phone: "I've got a young bloody knight-errant here. They sacked his boss, so he resigned. Have a look at him.") At the outbreak of the Second World War, Foot volunteered for military service, but was rejected because of his chronic asthma.

In 1940, under the pen-name "Cato" he and two other Beaverbrook journalists (Frank Owen, editor of the Standard, and Peter Howard of the Daily Express) published Guilty Men, which attacked the appeasement policy and slow pace of British re-armament under the National Governments of Ramsay MacDonald, Stanley Baldwin, and Neville Chamberlain; it became a runaway bestseller. (In so doing, Foot reversed his position of the 1935 election – when he had attacked the Conservatives as militaristic and demanded disarmament in the face of Nazi Germany.) Beaverbrook made Foot editor of the Evening Standard in 1942, when he was aged 28. During the war, Foot made a speech that was later featured in the documentary TV series The World at War broadcast in February 1974. Foot was speaking in defence of the Daily Mirror, which had criticised the conduct of the war by the Churchill government. He mocked the notion that the Government would make no more territorial demands of other newspapers if they allowed the Mirror to be censored.

Foot left the Standard in 1945 to join the Daily Herald as a columnist. The Daily Herald was jointly owned by the Trades Union Congress and Odhams Press, and was effectively an official Labour Party paper. He rejoined Tribune as editor from 1948 to 1952, and was again the paper's editor from 1955 to 1960. Throughout his political career he railed against the increasing corporate domination of the press.

== Member of Parliament ==
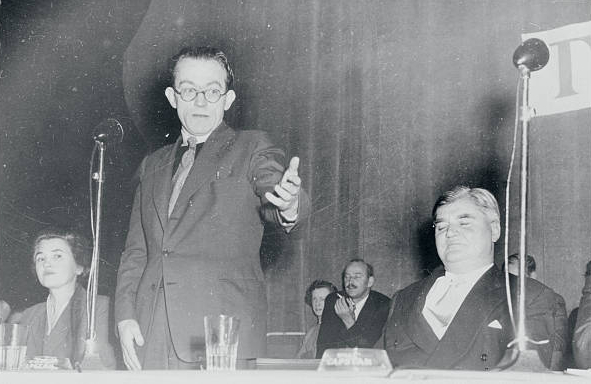
Foot (standing) addressing Tribune supporters at the Labour Party Conference, 1953

Foot fought the Plymouth Devonport constituency in the 1945 general election. His election agent was Labour activist and lifelong friend Ron Lemin. He won the seat for Labour for the first time, holding it until his surprise defeat by Dame Joan Vickers at the 1955 general election. Until 1957, he was the most prominent ally of Aneurin Bevan, who had taken Cripps's place as leader of the Labour left. He successfully urged Bevan to follow through with his threat to resign from the Cabinet in protest of the introduction of prescription charges at the National Health Service, leading to a split in the Labour Party between Bevanites and Gaitskellites. Foot and Bevan fell out after Bevan renounced unilateral nuclear disarmament at the 1957 Labour Party conference.

Before the Cold War began in the late 1940s, Foot favoured a 'third way' foreign policy for Europe (he was joint author with Richard Crossman and Ian Mikardo of the pamphlet Keep Left in 1947), but in the wake of the communist seizure of power in Hungary and Czechoslovakia he and Tribune took a strongly anti-communist position, eventually embracing NATO.

Foot was, however, a critic of the West's handling of the Korean War, an opponent of West German rearmament in the early 1950s and a founder member of the Campaign for Nuclear Disarmament (CND) in 1957. Under his editorship, Tribune opposed both the British government's Suez campaign and the Soviet crushing of the Hungarian Revolution in 1956. During this period, he made regular television appearances on the current-affairs programmes In The News (BBC Television) and subsequently Free Speech (ITV). "There was certainly nothing wrong with his television technique in those days," reflected Anthony Howard shortly after Foot's death. Foot joined the Who Killed Kennedy? Committee set up by Bertrand Russell in 1964.

Foot returned to parliament at a by-election in Ebbw Vale, Monmouthshire, in 1960, the seat having been left vacant by Bevan's death. He had the Labour whip withdrawn in March 1961 after rebelling against the Labour leadership over Royal Air Force estimates. He only returned to the Parliamentary Labour Group in 1963, when Harold Wilson became Leader of the Labour Party following the sudden death of Hugh Gaitskell.

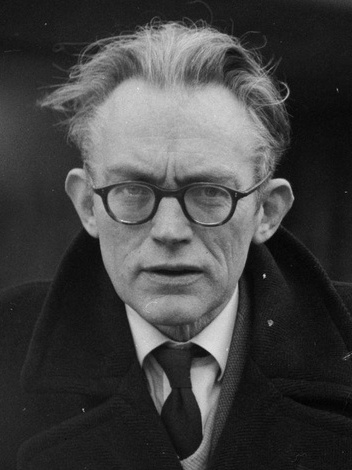
Foot in 1960

Harold Wilson — the subject of an enthusiastic campaign biography by Foot published by Robert Maxwell's Pergamon Press in 1964 – offered Foot a place in his first government, but Foot turned it down, instead becoming the leader of Labour's left opposition from the back benches. He opposed the government's moves to restrict immigration, join the European Communities (or "Common Market" as they were referred to) and reform the trade unions, was against the Vietnam War and Rhodesia's unilateral declaration of independence, and denounced the Soviet suppression of "socialism with a human face" in Czechoslovakia in 1968. He also famously allied with the Tory right-winger Enoch Powell to scupper the government's plan to abolish the voting rights of hereditary peers and create a House of Lords comprising only life peers – a "seraglio of eunuchs" as Foot put it.

Foot challenged James Callaghan for the post of Treasurer of the Labour Party in 1967, but failed.

=== In government ===
After 1970, Labour moved to the left and Wilson came to an accommodation with Foot. Foot served in the second Wilson shadow cabinet in various roles between 1970 and 1974. In April 1972, he stood for the Deputy Leadership of the party, along with Edward Short and Anthony Crosland. The first ballot saw Foot narrowly come second to Short winning 110 votes to the latter's 111. Crosland polled 61 votes and was eliminated. It was reported in the next day's Glasgow Herald that Short was the favourite to pick up most of Crosland's votes. The second ballot saw Short increase his total to 145 votes, while Foot's only rose to 116, giving Short victory by 29 votes.

When, in 1974, Labour returned to office under Wilson, Foot became Secretary of State for Employment. According to Ben Pimlott, his appointment was intended to please the left of the party and the Trade Unions. In this role, he played the major part in the government's efforts to maintain the trade unions' support. He was also responsible for the Health and Safety at Work etc. Act 1974, as well as the Trade Union and Labour Relations Act 1974 that repealed the Heath ministry's trade union reforms in the Industrial Relations Act 1971, and the Employment Protection Act 1975, which introduced legal protections against being sacked for becoming pregnant and legislated for maternity pay. His time as Employment Secretary also saw Acas adopt its current name and modern form as a body with independence from government.

Foot was one of the mainstays of the "no" campaign in the 1975 referendum on British membership of the European Communities. When Wilson retired in 1976, Foot contested the party leadership and led in the first ballot, but was ultimately defeated by James Callaghan. Later that year Foot was elected Deputy Leader, and during the Callaghan government Foot took a seat in Cabinet as Leader of the House of Commons, which gave him the unenviable task of trying to maintain the survival of the Callaghan government as its majority evaporated. However, he was able to steer numerous government proposals through the Commons, often by very narrow majorities, including increases in pension and benefit rates, the creation of the Police Complaints Board, the expansion of comprehensive schools, the establishment of a statutory responsibility to provide housing for the homeless, universal Child Benefit, the nationalisation of shipbuilding, abolishing pay beds in NHS hospitals, and housing security for agricultural workers, before the government fell in a vote of no confidence by a single vote. Whilst Leader of the Commons, Foot simultaneously held the post of Lord President of the Council.

In 1975, Foot, along with Jennie Lee and others, courted controversy when they supported Indira Gandhi, the Prime Minister of India, after she prompted the declaration of a state of emergency. In December 1975, The Times ran an editorial titled 'Is Mr Foot a Fascist?' — their answer was that he was — after Norman Tebbit accused him of 'undiluted fascism' when Foot said that the Ferrybridge Six deserved dismissal for defying a closed shop.

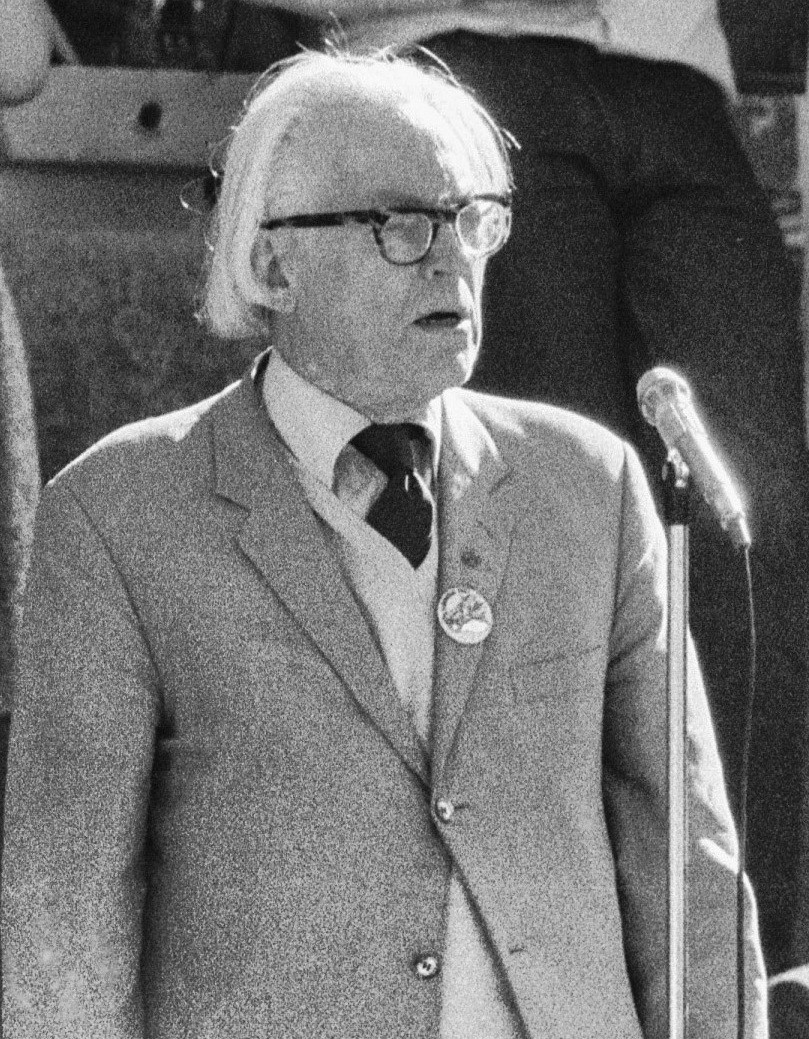
Foot in 1979

== Labour leadership ==
Following Labour's 1979 general election defeat by Margaret Thatcher, James Callaghan remained as party leader for the next 18 months before he resigned. Foot was elected Labour leader on 10 November 1980, beating Denis Healey in the second round of the leadership election (the last leadership contest to involve only Labour MPs). Foot presented himself as a compromise candidate, capable – unlike Healey – of uniting the party, which at the time was riven by the grassroots left-wing insurgency centred around Tony Benn.

The Bennites called for MPs who had acquiesced in Callaghan's policies to be replaced by left-wingers who would support unilateral nuclear disarmament, withdrawal from the European Communities, and widespread nationalisation. Benn did not stand for the leadership; apart from Foot and Healey, the other candidates (both eliminated in the first round) were John Silkin, a Tribunite like Foot, and Peter Shore, a Eurosceptic.

In 1980, Healey was widely expected by the media and many political figures to be the next Labour leader. However, Steve Richards notes that while "Healey was widely seen as the obvious successor to Callaghan", and that sections of the media ultimately reacted with "disbelief" at Labour not choosing him, the "choice of Foot was not as perverse as it seemed". He argues Labour MPs were looking for a figure from the left who could unite the wider party with the leadership, which Healey could not do. Richards states that despite being on the left of the party, Foot was not a "tribal politician" and had proved he could work with those of different ideologies and had been a loyal deputy to Callaghan. Thus Foot "was seen as the unity candidate" and won the election.

When he became leader, Foot was already 67 years old and frail. Following the 1979 energy crisis, Britain went into recession in 1980, which was blamed on the Conservative government's controversial monetarist policy against inflation, which had the effect of increasing unemployment. As a result, Labour had moved ahead of the Conservatives in the opinion polls. Following Foot's election as leader, opinion polls showed a double-digit lead for Labour, boosting his hopes of becoming prime minister at the next general election, which had to be held by May 1984.

When Foot became leader, the Conservative politician Kenneth Baker commented: "Labour was led by Dixon of Dock Green under Jim Callaghan. Now it is led by Worzel Gummidge." Foot's nickname in the press gradually became "Worzel Gummidge", or "Worzel". This became particularly common after Remembrance Day 1981, when he attended the Cenotaph observance wearing a coat that some said resembled a donkey jacket. After his tenure as leader, Foot would be "depicted as a scarecrow on ITV's satirical puppet show Spitting Image."

Almost immediately following his election as leader, he was faced with a serious crisis. On 25 January 1981, four senior politicians on the right wing of the Labour Party (Roy Jenkins, Shirley Williams, David Owen and William Rodgers, the so-called "Gang of Four") left Labour and formed the Social Democratic Party, which was launched on 26 March 1981. This was largely seen as the consequence of the Labour Party's swing to the left, polarising divisions in an already divided party.

The SDP won the support of large sections of the British media. For most of 1981 and early 1982, its opinion poll ratings suggested that the SDP could at least overtake Labour and possibly win a general election. The Conservatives were then unpopular because of the economic policies of Margaret Thatcher, which had seen unemployment reach a postwar high.

The Labour left was still strong. In 1981, Benn decided to challenge Healey for the Deputy Leadership of the Labour Party, a contest Healey won, albeit narrowly. Foot struggled to make an impact, and was widely criticised for his ineffectiveness. He was criticised by some on the left for supporting Thatcher's immediate resort to military action during the Falklands War. The conflict further undermined his position as he at first demanded an effective government response to the Argentinian aggression, but then emphasised the need to work for a peace settlement with the military junta led by General Galtieri. The right-wing newspapers lambasted him consistently for what they saw as his bohemian eccentricity, attacking him for wearing what they described as a "donkey jacket" (actually he wore a type of duffel coat) at the wreath-laying ceremony at the Cenotaph on Remembrance Day in November 1981, for which he was likened to an "out-of-work navvy" by a fellow Labour MP. Foot later said that the Queen Mother had described it as a "sensible coat for a day like this". He later donated the coat to the People's History Museum in Manchester, which holds a collection that spans Foot's entire political career from 1938 to 1990, and his personal papers dating back to 1926.

The formation of the SDP – which formed an alliance with the Liberal Party in June 1981 – contributed to a fall in Labour support. The double-digit lead that had still been intact in opinion polls at the start of 1981 was swiftly wiped out, and by the end of October the opinion polls were showing the Alliance ahead of Labour. Labour briefly regained their lead of most opinion polls in early 1982, but when the Falklands conflict ended on 14 June 1982 with a British victory over Argentina, opinion polls showed the Conservatives firmly in the lead. Their position at the top of the polls was strengthened by the return to economic growth later in the year. It was looking certain that the Conservatives would be re-elected, and the only key issue that the media were still speculating by the end of 1982 was whether it would be Labour or the Alliance who formed the next opposition.

Through late 1982 and early 1983, there was constant speculation that Labour MPs would replace Foot with Healey as leader. Such speculation increased after Labour lost the 1983 Bermondsey by-election, in which Peter Tatchell was Labour candidate, standing against a Conservative, a Liberal (eventual winner Simon Hughes) and John O'Grady, who had declared himself the Real Bermondsey Labour candidate. Critically, Labour held on in a subsequent by-election in Darlington, and Foot remained leader for the 1983 general election.

== 1983 general election ==
The 1983 Labour manifesto, strongly socialist in tone, advocated unilateral nuclear disarmament, higher personal taxation and a return to a more interventionist industrial policy. The manifesto also pledged that a Labour government would abolish the House of Lords, nationalise banks and immediately withdraw from the then-European Economic Community. Gerald Kaufman, once Harold Wilson's press officer and during the 1980s a prominent figure on the Labour right-wing, described the 1983 Labour manifesto as "the longest suicide note in history."

As a statement on internal democracy, Foot passed the edict that the manifesto would consist of all resolutions arrived at conference. The party also failed to master the medium of television, while Foot addressed public meetings around the country, and made some radio broadcasts, in the same manner as Clement Attlee did in 1945.

The Daily Mirror was the only major newspaper to back Foot and the Labour Party at the 1983 general election, urging its readers to vote Labour and "Stop the waste of our nation, for your job your children and your future" in response to the mass unemployment that followed Conservative Prime Minister Margaret Thatcher's monetarist economic policies to reduce inflation. Most other newspapers urged their readers to vote Conservative.

The Labour Party, led by Foot, lost to the Conservatives in a landslide – a result that had been widely predicted by the opinion polls since the previous summer. The only consolation for Foot and Labour was that they did not lose their place in opposition to the SDP–Liberal Alliance, who came close to them in terms of votes but were still a long way behind in terms of seats. Foot was very critical of the Alliance, accusing them of "siphoning" Labour support and enabling the Tories to win more seats.

Foot resigned days later following the bitter election defeat, and was succeeded as leader on 2 October by Neil Kinnock; who had been tipped from the outset to be Labour's choice of new leader.

== Backbenches and retirement ==
Foot took a back seat in Labour politics following 1983 and retired from the House of Commons at the 1992 general election, when Labour lost to the Conservative Party (led by John Major) for the fourth election in succession, but remained politically active. From 1987 to 1992, he was the oldest sitting British MP (preceding former Prime Minister Edward Heath). He defended Salman Rushdie, after Ayatollah Khomeini advocated killing the novelist in a fatwa, and took a strongly pro-interventionist position against Serbia and Montenegro during the Yugoslav Wars, supporting NATO forces whilst citing defence of civilian populations in Croatia and Bosnia. In addition, he was among the Patrons of the British-Croatian Society. The Guardian's political editor Michael White criticised Foot's "overgenerous" support for Croatian President Franjo Tuđman.

Foot remained a high-profile member of the Campaign for Nuclear Disarmament (CND). He wrote several books, including highly regarded biographies of Aneurin Bevan and H. G. Wells, and was a vice-president of the H. G. Wells Society.

Foot was an Honorary Associate of the National Secular Society and a Distinguished Supporter of the British Humanist Association. In 1988, he was elected a Fellow of the Royal Society of Literature.

In a poll of Labour Party activists in 2008, he was voted the worst post-war Labour Party leader.

=== Gordievsky's KGB allegations ===
Oleg Gordievsky, a high-ranking KGB officer who defected from the Soviet Union to the UK in 1985, made allegations against Foot in his 1995 memoirs. Essentially, the allegations claimed that, up until 1968, Foot had spoken to KGB agents "dozens of times", passing information about politics and the trade unions, and Foot had been paid a total of around £1,500 for his information (said to be worth £37,000 in 2018, equivalent to £48,252 in 2025). The Sunday Times, which serialised Gordievsky's book under the headline "KGB: Michael Foot was our agent", stated in an article of 19 February that the Soviet intelligence services regarded Foot as an "agent of influence" (and a "useful idiot"), codenamed "Agent BOOT", and that he was in the pay of the KGB for many years. Crucially, the newspaper used material from the original manuscript of the book that mentioned Foot by name, something excluded from the published book.

At the time a leading article in The Independent newspaper asserted: "It seems extraordinary that such an unreliable figure should now be allowed, given the lack of supporting evidence, to damage the reputation of figures such as Mr Foot." In a February 1992 interview, Gordievsky declared that he had no further revelations to make about the Labour Party. Foot successfully sued the Sunday Times, winning "substantial" damages.

Following Foot's death, Charles Moore writing in The Daily Telegraph in 2010 gave an account that he said had been provided to him by Gordievsky, containing additional uncorroborated information concerning his allegations. Moore said there was no evidence to show that Foot gave away state secrets.

== Plymouth Argyle ==
Foot was a passionate supporter of Plymouth Argyle Football Club from his childhood and once remarked that he was not going to die until he had seen them play in the Premier League. He served for several years as a director of the club, seeing two promotions under his tenure.

For his 90th birthday, Foot was registered with the Football League as an honorary player and given the shirt number 90. This made him the oldest registered professional player in the history of football.

== Personal life ==
Foot was married to the film-maker, author and feminist historian Jill Craigie (1911–1999) from 1949 until her death fifty years later. He had no children.

In February 2007, it was revealed that Foot had an extramarital affair with a woman around 35 years his junior in the early 1970s. The affair, which lasted nearly a year, put a considerable strain on his marriage. The affair is detailed in Foot's official biography, published in March 2007.

On 23 July 2006, his 93rd birthday, Michael Foot became the longest-lived leader of a major British political party, passing Lord Callaghan's record of 92 years, 364 days.

A staunch republican (though well liked by the Royal Family on a personal level), Foot rejected honours from the Queen and the government, including a knighthood and a peerage, on more than one occasion.

He was also an atheist. As of June 2021, he was one of four leaders of the Labour Party to declare that they did not follow any religion.

Oliver Cromwell was one of his heroes, and one of Foot's first acts as an MP in 1945 was to demand a return of an alabaster bust of Cromwell to Parliament. Along with his brother John, he served as a vice-president of the Cromwell Association.

== Health ==
Foot suffered from asthma (which disqualified him from service in the Second World War) and eczema.

In October 1963, he was involved in a car crash, suffering pierced lungs, broken ribs, and a broken left leg. Foot used a walking stick for the rest of his life. According to former MP Tam Dalyell, Foot had, up until the accident, been a chain-smoker, but he gave up the habit thereafter. Jill Craigie also suffered a crushed hand in this car crash.

In October 1976, Foot became blind in one eye following an attack of shingles.

== Death ==
Foot died at his Hampstead, north London home on the morning of 3 March 2010 at the age of 96 after a long period of ill health. The House of Commons was informed of the news later that day by Justice Secretary Jack Straw, who told the House: "I am sure that this news will be received with great sadness not only in my own party but across the country as a whole." Foot's funeral was a non-religious service, held on 15 March 2010 at Golders Green Crematorium in North-West London.

== In popular culture ==
=== "Foot Heads Arms Body" ===
On 22 June 1978, The Guardian ran an article with the headline "Foot hits back on Nazi comparison". Reader David C. Allan of Edinburgh responded with a letter to the editor, which the paper ran on 27 June. Decrying the headline's apparent pun, Allan suggested that, if Foot were in future to be appointed Secretary of State for Defence, The Guardian might cover it under the headline "Foot Heads Arms Body".

The belief later gained currency that The Times actually had run the headline. Some decades later, Martyn Cornell recalled the story as true, saying he had written the headline himself as a Times subeditor around 1986. The headline does not, however, appear in The Times Digital Archive, which includes every day's newspaper from 1785 into the 21st century.

In 2018, John Rentoul included this headline in his "The Top 10: Headlines", subtitled "Clever and memorable plays on words that have made journalistic history".

=== Fictional portrayals ===
Foot was portrayed by Patrick Godfrey in the 2002 BBC production of Ian Curteis's long unproduced The Falklands Play and by Michael Pennington in the film The Iron Lady.

== Bibliography ==
- Cato; Foot, Michael; Howard, Peter; Owen, Frank (1940). Guilty Men. Left Book Club. OCLC 3100252.
- Cassius, pen name (1940). Brendan and Beverley. Victor Gollancz.
- Cassius, pen name (1943). The Trial of Mussolini: Being a Verbatim Report of the First Great Trial for War Criminals Held in London Sometime in 1944 or 1945. Victor Gollancz.
- The Pen & the Sword: A Year in the Life of Jonathan Swift (3rd printing ed.). MacGibbon and Kee. 1966. LCCN 70-386053.
- Foot, Michael; Jones, Mervyn (1957). Guilty Men, 1957: Suez & Cyprus. Victor Gollancz. LCCN 57-10197.
- Foot, Michael (1962). Aneurin Bevan. Vol. 1. MacGibbon and Kee.
- Foot, Michael (1973). Aneurin Bevan. Vol. 2. MacGibbon and Kee. ISBN 0-261-61508-4.
- Debts of Honour. Harper & Row. 1981. ISBN 0-06-039001-8.
- Another Heart and Other Pulses. Collins. 1984. ISBN 978-0-00-217256-1.
- Foot, Michael (1985). H. G.: The History of Mr Wells. Doubleday. ISBN 978-1-887178-04-4.
- Loyalists and Loners. Collins. 1986. ISBN 978-0-00-217583-8.
- Politics of Paradise. HarperCollins. 1989. ISBN 0-06-039091-3.
- Foot, Michael (1967). "Introduction". Gulliver's Travels. Penguin.
- Foot, Michael (1997). ""Bevan's Message to the World"". In Goodman, Geoffrey (ed.). The State of the Nation: The Political Legacy of Aneurin Bevan. Victor Gollancz.
- Foot, Michael; Russell, Bertrand (1998). "Introduction". Autobiography. Routledge.
- Foot, Michael (1999). Dr Strangelove, I Presume. Victor Gollancz.
- Foot, Michael (2003). Brivati, Brian (ed.). The Uncollected Michael Foot. Politicos Publishing. ISBN 978-1-84275-096-4.
- Foot, Michael; Rosen, Greg (2005). "Foreword". Old Labour to New. Methuen Publishing. ISBN 978-1-84275-045-2.
- Foot, Michael (2006). Isaac Foot: A West Country Boy – Apostle of England. Politicos Publishing. ISBN 978-1-84275-181-7.

== Biographies ==
- Hoggart, Simon; Leigh, David (1981). Michael Foot: a Portrait. Hodder. ISBN 0-340-27040-3.
- Jones, Mervyn (1993). Michael Foot. Gollancz. ISBN 0-575-05933-8.
- Morgan, Kenneth O. (2007). Michael Foot: A Life. HarperPress (HarperCollins). ISBN 978-0-00-717826-1.

Media offices
Preceded by Frank Owen	Editor of the Evening Standard; 1942–1943	Succeeded by Sydney Elliott
Preceded by Jon Kimche	Editor of Tribune; 1948–1952; Served alongside: Evelyn Anderson	Succeeded by Bob Edwards
Preceded by Evelyn Anderson	Editor of Tribune; 1948–1952; Served alongside: Evelyn Anderson	Succeeded by Bob Edwards
Preceded by Bob Edwards	Editor of Tribune; 1955–1960	Succeeded by Richard Clements
Parliament of the United Kingdom
Preceded by Leslie Hore-Belisha	Member of Parliament for Plymouth Devonport; 1945–1955	Succeeded by Joan Vickers
Preceded by Aneurin Bevan	Member of Parliament for Ebbw Vale; 1960–1983	Constituency abolished
New constituency	Member of Parliament for Blaenau Gwent; 1983–1992	Succeeded by Llew Smith
Political offices
Preceded by William Whitelaw	Secretary of State for Employment; 1974–1976	Succeeded by Albert Booth
Preceded by Edward Short	Leader of the House of Commons; 1976–1979	Succeeded by Norman St John-Stevas
Preceded by Edward Short	Lord President of the Council; 1976–1979	Succeeded by The Lord Soames
Preceded by James Callaghan	Leader of the Opposition; 1980–1983	Succeeded by Neil Kinnock
Party political offices
Preceded by Edward Short	Deputy Leader of the Labour Party; 1976–1980	Succeeded by Denis Healey
Preceded by James Callaghan	Leader of the Labour Party; 1980–1983	Succeeded by Neil Kinnock
Honorary titles
Preceded by Robert Edwards	Oldest sitting member of the House of Commons; 1987–1992	Succeeded by Edward Heath
