= Dingle Foot =

British politician and lawyer

The Right Honourable Sir Dingle Foot QC

Solicitor General for England and Wales
- In office 18 October 1964 – 24 August 1967
- Prime Minister: Harold Wilson
- Preceded by: Sir Peter Rawlinson
- Succeeded by: Sir Arthur Irvine

Member of Parliament for Ipswich
- In office 24 October 1957 – 29 May 1970
- Preceded by: Richard Stokes
- Succeeded by: Ernle Money

Member of Parliament for Dundee
- In office 27 October 1931 – 15 June 1945 Serving with Florence Horsbrugh
- Preceded by: Edwin Scrymgeour; Michael Marcus
- Succeeded by: Thomas Cook; John Strachey

Personal details
- Born: 24 August 1905 Plymouth, England
- Died: 18 June 1978 (aged 72) British Hong Kong
- Party: Labour (after 1956)
- Other political affiliations: Liberal (before 1956)
- Spouse: Dorothy Mary Elliston
- Parents: Isaac Foot; Eva Mackintosh
- Relatives: Hugh Foot, Baron Caradon (brother); John Foot, Baron Foot (brother); Michael Foot (brother); Paul Foot (nephew); Sarah Foot (niece); Oliver Foot (nephew)
- Education: Balliol College Oxford

Sir Dingle Mackintosh Foot, QC (24 August 1905 – 18 June 1978) was a British lawyer, Liberal and Labour Member of Parliament, and Solicitor General for England and Wales in the first government of Harold Wilson.

== Family and education ==
Born in Plymouth, Devon, Foot was the eldest son of Isaac Foot, who was a solicitor and founder of the Plymouth law firm, Foot and Bowden. Isaac Foot was an active member of the Liberal Party and was Liberal Member of Parliament for Bodmin in Cornwall between 1922 and 1924 and again from 1929 to 1935, and also a Lord Mayor of Plymouth.

Dingle Foot was educated at Bembridge School, a boys' independent school on the Isle of Wight, and at Balliol College, Oxford, where he was President of the Oxford Union in 1928. He had four brothers: Michael, a prominent figure in the Labour Party and Leader of the Opposition from 1980 to 1983; John (Lord Foot), a Liberal politician; Hugh (Lord Caradon), Governor of Cyprus and British Ambassador to the United Nations and Christopher, a solicitor who joined the family firm. He also had two sisters. His nephew, Hugh's son, was the campaigning journalist Paul Foot.

He married Dorothy Mary Elliston, who died in 1989. They had no children.

== Law career ==
Foot was admitted to Gray's Inn on 19 November 1925 and called to the bar on 2 July 1930. He became a Master Bencher in 1952 and was appointed Queen's Counsel in 1954 He had been in active practice after having qualified a Barrister of England both in England and in several Commonwealth countries. He was called to the Bar or admitted as a solicitor or practitioner in Ghana (1948), Sri Lanka (1951), Northern Rhodesia (1956), Sierra Leone (1959), Supreme Court of India (as a Senior Advocate) (1960), Bahrain (1962) and Malaysia (1964). He also appeared regularly in the Courts of Kenya, Uganda, Tanganyika, Nyasaland and Pakistan. In addition, he had been regularly engaged in the Judicial Committee of the Privy Council since 1945.

== Politics ==
From 1931 to 1945 Foot was Liberal Member of Parliament (MP) for Dundee. He was Parliamentary Secretary to the Ministry of Economic Warfare in Winston Churchill's wartime coalition, and a member of the British delegation to San Francisco Conference in 1945. He visited Washington in June 1944, and secured an agreement with the US State Department, the new War Refugee Board and the Foreign Economic Administration to supply 550 tons of aid parcels a month over a three-month period to 'unassimilated civilian internees' in war-zones in Europe. At the 1945 election he lost his seat to Labour.

At the 1950 general election Foot defended the formerly Liberal seat of North Cornwall, following the defection of its member Tom Horabin to Labour in 1947, but he again lost, to the Conservative Harold Roper. He stood for the seat in 1951, losing again but by a narrower margin. Foot left the Liberals and joined the Labour Party in 1956. He was Labour MP for Ipswich from a 1957 by-election until 1970. Following his appointment as Solicitor General in the first government of Harold Wilson, he was knighted and made a Privy Counsellor in 1964. He served in this post for almost 3 years, from 18 October 1964 until 24 August 1967, until he was replaced by Arthur Irvine following a major government reshuffle. In 1970 he was again defeated, this time by the Conservative candidate.

== Other work ==
In the late 1940s and early 1950s Foot was often seen on BBC television as the moderator of the current affairs programme In the News. Often appearing with him were Michael Foot and Sir Bob Boothby. His publications included Despotism in Disguise (1937) and British Political Crises (1976).

== Later years ==
After leaving Parliament Foot returned to the bar. In 1969, he defended Bernadette Devlin MP, and in 1970 was called to the Northern Irish bar. He also practised extensively in the Commonwealth.

Foot died on 18 June 1978 in a hotel in Hong Kong, after choking on a sandwich.

== Arms ==
Coat of arms of Dingle Foot

Notes
Displayed in a painting at Gray's Inn.
Crest
On a tower Sable between two lions’ gambs Gules a chough Proper.
Escutcheon
Or on a chevron engrailed Sable between three lions’ gambs Gules three wheels Or.
Motto
Pro Lege Et Libertate

Parliament of the United Kingdom
Preceded by Michael Marcus; Edwin Scrymgeour	Member of Parliament for Dundee; 1931–1945; With: Florence Horsbrugh	Succeeded by Thomas Cook; John Strachey
Preceded by Richard Stokes	Member of Parliament for Ipswich; 1957–1970	Succeeded by Ernle Money
Legal offices
Preceded by Sir Peter Rawlinson	Solicitor General for England and Wales; 1964–1967	Succeeded by Arthur Irvine
