= One Foot in Front of the Other (disambiguation) =

One Foot in Front of the Other is a 2021 mixtape by Griff.

One Foot in Front of the Other may also refer to:

- "One Foot in Front of the Other", a 2020 song by Ben Gillies
- "One Foot in Front of the Other", a 1984 song by Bone Symphony from the Revenge of the Nerds – Original Motion Picture Soundtrack

== See also ==
- One Foot (disambiguation)
