= Red Shelley =

1981 book by Paul Foot

- Cover of the first edition
- Author: Paul Foot
- Language: English
- Subject: Percy Bysshe Shelley
- Published: 1981
- Publisher: Sidgwick & Jackson
- Publication place: United Kingdom
- Media type: Print
- ISBN: 978-0283986796

Red Shelley is a 1981 work of literary criticism by Paul Foot. In it, the author draws attention to the radical political stance of the Romantic poet Percy Bysshe Shelley, as revealed in poems such as "Queen Mab" and "The Masque of Anarchy".

== Background ==
Foot describes how Shelley, while living in Italy, heard the news of the Peterloo Massacre of 1819. Like Shelley, Foot was an alumnus of University College, Oxford (from which Shelley was expelled for expressing atheist views), and held the poet to be his inspiration in embracing socialism.

"The Masque of Anarchy", Foot's favourite poem, was given to his sons to learn by heart, and a live performance by Maxine Peake at the 2013 Manchester International Festival, to commemorate the anniversary of Peterloo was the basis of a BBC Culture Show documentary that referenced Foot's work.

== Reception and influence ==
Communist thinkers such as Karl Marx are known to have found inspiration in Shelley's work. However, critics including Christopher Hitchens have shed doubt on Foot's interpretation of Shelley's poetry, which "if [one doesn't] chance to know its context may be as readily pressed into service by any movement".

In 2019, poet and activist Benjamin Zephaniah identified Red Shelley as a book that changed his life", saying: "As a young, angry black man in the 1980s, it was a revelation to find a dead white poet that made sense to me. Shelley turned me on to Mary Shelley, and Byron, and Keats, and my eyes were opened. Good poetry has no age, and no colour."
