= Eva Mackintosh =

British political figure and mother of Michael Foot

- Born: 8 November 1877; Derbyshire, England
- Died: 17 May 1946 (aged 68); Plymouth, England
- Occupation: Political activist
- Known for: Mother of Michael Foot
- Spouse: Isaac Foot (m. 1903)
- Children: 7, including Hugh, Dingle, John, and Michael

Eva Jane Mackintosh (8 November 1877 – 17 May 1946) was a British political activist and community figure, best known as the mother of the Labour leader Michael Foot and the wife of the Liberal politician Isaac Foot.

== Early life ==
Mackintosh was born in Derbyshire in November 1877. She was raised with strong Liberal and Nonconformist values.

She was brought up in a family with a tradition of public service and religious engagement. Mackintosh grew up in an environment that encouraged intellectual curiosity, reading and debate—traits that later influenced the upbringing of her own children.

== Background and ancestry ==
Mackintosh came from a Scottish family with roots in the Highlands. Her parents were part of the wider Mackintosh clan, a branch traditionally associated with Nonconformist religious traditions and Liberal politics. Family records indicate that several members of the Mackintosh line were involved in education, religious ministry and local public service during the nineteenth century.

These influences shaped Mackintosh’s upbringing, particularly the emphasis on literacy, civic duty and religious discipline that later characterised her own household in Plymouth.

== Marriage and family ==
She married Isaac Foot in 1903. Together they had seven children, including:

- Hugh Foot – diplomat and Governor of Cyprus
- Dingle Foot – MP and Solicitor General for England and Wales
- John Foot – Liberal peer
- Michael Foot – Leader of the Labour Party (1980–1983)

The Foot household was known for political discussion, literary interests and a strong emphasis on education.

== Community involvement ==
Eva was active in charitable and church work in Plymouth and the West Country. She was regarded as a respected figure in local cultural and religious organisations.

Beyond her church duties she supported a range of community causes, including relief work during the First World War. Local reports show that she organised clothing drives, reading circles for young women and fundraising events linked to Nonconformist chapels in Devon.

She also served on visiting committees of several Plymouth charitable institutions, including missions providing food and support for families of dockyard labourers. Her work placed her among a network of politically active women in the West Country who combined Liberal values with religious outreach.

During the interwar period she was involved in the Liberal Women’s organisation in Devon, helping to coordinate meetings, fundraising and public talks. Although not a public political figure herself, she played a supportive role in her husband's career, and contemporary reports described her as a moderating influence within local Liberal circles.

== Later life ==
In the 1930s and 1940s Mackintosh continued supporting her husband’s public work while remaining involved in local church and charitable organisations. Although she rarely appeared in public political events, she was well known in Plymouth civic circles for her organisational skills and her commitment to Nonconformist social values.

During the wartime bombing of Plymouth, the Foot family home participated in community support efforts, offering practical and pastoral assistance to neighbours affected by air raids.

== Personal life and death ==
Mackintosh was known for her quiet manner, firm religious convictions and strong sense of duty. She and her family lived in Plymouth, England.

Friends and family recalled her as deeply devoted to her children, encouraging their academic ambitions and political independence. Michael Foot later wrote that his mother provided a moral framework that shaped all his siblings' careers.

Despite the family's political prominence, she largely avoided public attention, preferring to work behind the scenes in religious and charitable contexts.

Eva Mackintosh died at her home in Plymouth on 17 May 1946. She was 68 years old and was survived by her husband and seven children.
