= Foot (disambiguation) =

The foot is an anatomical structure found in many vertebrates.

Foot or feet may also refer to:

== Measures ==
- Foot (unit), a unit of length, now usually 0.3048 m or 12 inches
- Foot, an alternative name for the fotmal, a unit of weight usually equal to 70 pounds
- Foot of a perpendicular, in geometry, a point where perpendicular lines intersect

== Arts, entertainment, and media ==
- The Feet, a defunct American dance magazine (1970–1973)
- Foot Clan, also known as "the Foot", a group of ninja in the Teenage Mutant Ninja Turtles series
- Metrical foot, the rhythmic unit in poetry
- "Feet", a song by Rodney Atkins from the album Take a Back Road

== Places ==
- Foot Lake, a lake in Minnesota
- Tchibanga Airport, Gabon (ICAO code FOOT)

== People ==
- Foot (surname)

== Other uses ==
- Faculty of Optics and Optometry of Terrassa, or FOOT, at Polytechnic University of Catalonia
- Foot (furniture), the floor level termination of furniture legs
- Foot (hieroglyph), an ancient Egyptian symbol
- Foot (mollusc), part of the typical mollusc body plan along with the shell, viscera, and mantle
- Foot (sewing), part of a sewing machine
- Foot (sailing), the lower edge of a sail
- Foot orienteering, the sport of orienteering
- Infantry; see List of Regiments of Foot
