= 1919 Plymouth Sutton by-election =

UK parliamentary by-election

- 28 November 1919
- Registered: 38,539
- Turnout: 72.5%

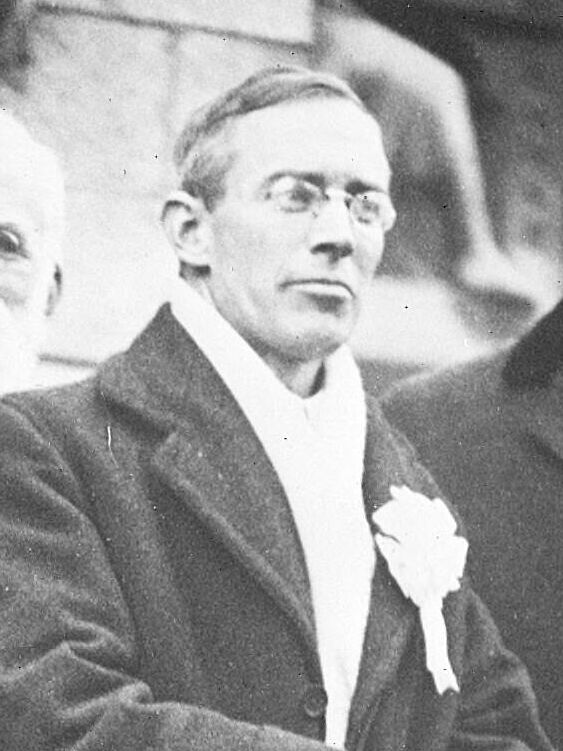
| | | Lab |
| Candidate | Nancy Astor | William Gay | Isaac Foot |
| Party | Unionist | Labour | Liberal |
| Alliance | Coalition |
| Popular vote | 14,495 | 9,292 | 4,139 |
| Percentage | 51.9% | 33.3% | 14.8% |
| Swing | ▼14.0% | ▲12.7% | ▼1.3% |
MP before election
Waldorf Astor
Unionist
Subsequent MP
Nancy Astor
Unionist

The 1919 Plymouth Sutton by-election was a parliamentary by-election held on 28 November 1919 for the British House of Commons constituency of Sutton in the city of Plymouth, Devon.

The seat had become vacant when the constituency's Conservative Member of Parliament (MP), Waldorf Astor, succeeded the peerage as the second Viscount Astor on the death of his father on 18 October 1919.

Astor had held the seat since the 1918 general election, and its predecessor Plymouth since the December 1910 general election.

== Candidates ==
- The Conservative Party selected as its candidate Astor's wife Nancy, Lady Astor. She was also the candidate of the Coalition Government.
- William Thomas Gay stood for Labour, having done so in the 1918 election. Thomas William Mercer again served as his agent.
- The Asquithian Liberals stood Isaac Foot, who had served on Plymouth City Council and had previously contested Totnes and Bodmin.

== Result ==
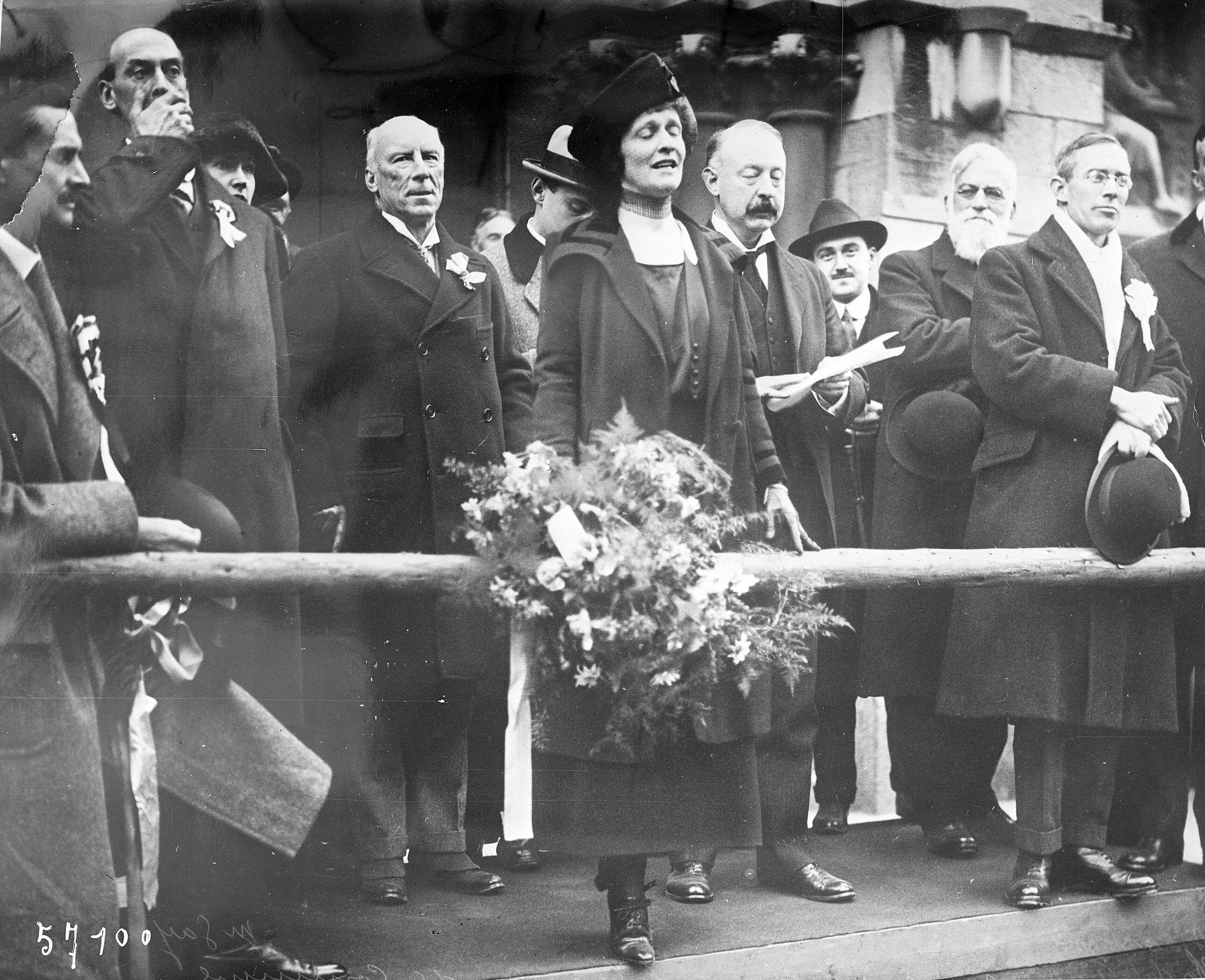
Astor giving her victory speech

Lady Astor retained the seat. She became the first woman to take up her seat in the Commons when the first woman to be elected, Countess Markievicz, (the Sinn Féin MP for Dublin St Patrick's refused to take her seat).

Plymouth Sutton by-election, 1919
| Party | | Candidate | Votes | % | ±% |
|---|---|---|---|---|---|
| C | Unionist | Nancy Astor | 14,495 | 51.9 | −14.0 |
| | Labour | William Gay | 9,292 | 33.3 | +12.7 |
| | Liberal | Isaac Foot | 4,139 | 14.8 | +1.3 |
| Majority | | | 5,203 | 18.6 | −26.7 |
| Turnout | | | 27,926 | 72.5 | +12.9 |
| Registered electors | | | 38,539 | | |
| | Unionist hold | | Swing | -13.3 | |
C indicates candidate endorsed by the coalition government.

== Previous result ==
General election 1918: Plymouth Sutton
| Party | | Candidate | Votes | % |
|---|---|---|---|---|
| C | Unionist | Waldorf Astor | 17,091 | 65.9 |
| | Labour | William Gay | 5,334 | 20.6 |
| | Liberal | Sidney Ransom | 3,488 | 13.5 |
| Majority | | | 11,757 | 45.3 |
| Turnout | | | 25,913 | 59.6 |
| Registered electors | | | 43,444 | |
| | Unionist win (new seat) | | | |
C indicates candidate endorsed by the coalition government.

== See also ==
- List of United Kingdom by-elections
- Plymouth Sutton constituency
