= Henry Foot =

English cricketer

Personal information
- Full name: Henry Boorn Foot
- Born: 21 November 1805; Romsey, Hampshire, England
- Died: 14 May 1857 (aged 51); Brighton, Victoria, Australia

Domestic team information
- Years: Team
- 1851/52: Victoria
- Only First-class: 29 March 1852 v Tasmania

Career statistics
Competition	First-class
Matches	1
Runs scored	22
Batting average	11.00
100s/50s	0/0
Top score	20
Balls bowled	0
Wickets	–
Bowling average	–
5 wickets in innings	–
10 wickets in match	–
Best bowling	–
Catches/stumpings	0/0
- Source: CricketArchive, 17 November 2011

Henry Foot (21 November 1805 – 14 May 1857) was an English-born cricketer who played for Victoria. He was born in Romsey, Hampshire and died in Brighton, Victoria.

Foot made a single first-class appearance for the side, during the 1851–52 season, against Tasmania. From the opening order, he scored 20 runs in the first innings in which he batted, and 2 runs in the second.
