= Isaac Foot =

British Liberal politician and solicitor

The Right Honourable Isaac Foot

Secretary for Mines
- In office 3 September 1931 – 30 September 1932
- Prime Minister: Ramsay MacDonald
- Preceded by: Manny Shinwell
- Succeeded by: Ernest Brown

Member of Parliament for Bodmin
- In office 30 May 1929 – 25 October 1935
- Preceded by: Gerald Harrison
- Succeeded by: John Rathbone
- In office 24 February 1922 – 9 October 1924
- Preceded by: Charles Hanson
- Succeeded by: Gerald Harrison

President of the Liberal Party
- In office 1947–1948
- Leader: Clement Davies
- Preceded by: Violet Bonham-Carter
- Succeeded by: Elliott Dodds

Personal details
- Born: 23 February 1880 Plymouth, England
- Died: 13 December 1960 (aged 80) Callington, Cornwall, England
- Party: Liberal
- Spouse(s): Eva Mackintosh; Catherine Dawe
- Children: Dingle (1905–1978); Hugh (1907–1990); John (1909–1999); Margaret Elizabeth (1911–1965); Michael (1913–2010); Jennifer Mackintosh Highet (1916–2002); Christopher Isaac (1917–1984)
- Relatives: Paul, Sarah, and Oliver (grandchildren)
- Profession: Solicitor

Isaac Foot (23 February 1880 – 13 December 1960) was a British Liberal politician and solicitor.

== Early life ==
Isaac Foot was born in Plymouth, the son of a carpenter and undertaker who was also named Isaac Foot, and educated at Plymouth Public School and the Hoe Grammar School, which he left at the age of 14. He then worked at the Admiralty in London, but returned to Plymouth to train as a solicitor. Foot qualified in 1902, and in 1903, with his friend Edgar Bowden, he set up the law firm Foot and Bowden, which as Foot-Anstey still exists.

He became a member of the Liberal Party, and in 1907 was elected to Plymouth City Council, of which he remained a member for twenty years, serving as Deputy Mayor in 1920. As Deputy Mayor he represented Plymouth in the United States for the celebrations of the Mayflower's tercentenary.

== Parliamentary career ==
Foot first stood for parliament in Totnes in January 1910, losing to the sitting Liberal Unionist, F. B. Mildmay He then stood twice for Bodmin, but was unsuccessful. At Plymouth Sutton in the by-election of November 1919 he was beaten by Nancy Astor, who became the first woman MP in Britain to take her seat in Parliament and a lifelong friend of Foot.

Foot was elected as Member of Parliament for Bodmin at a by-election in February 1922, retaining his seat in the general elections of 1922 and 1923. He lost his seat in October 1924 but regained it in the 1929 general election, when the Liberals took all five Cornish seats. He held the seat until he lost again in the 1935 general election.

Foot served on the Round Table Conference on India in 1930–31 and on Burma in 1931 and was also on the Joint Select committee on India. His championing of the poor of the subcontinent earnt him the sobriquet of "the member for the Depressed Classes".

In 1931 he became Secretary for Mines in the National Government, but resigned the following year in protest at the protectionist Ottawa Agreements.

He fought two more elections, at St Ives in 1937, and Tavistock in 1945, losing both.

== After parliament ==
In 1936 he was elected to serve on the Liberal Party Council. He became a Privy Counsellor in 1937. He served as President of the Liberal Party from 1947 to 1948.

Foot was a Methodist local preacher (as his father had been) and served as Vice President of the Methodist Conference (1937–38).

In 1945 he was chosen unanimously as Lord Mayor of Plymouth, despite not being a member of the council. Foot also served as deputy-chairman of the Cornwall Quarter Sessions in 1945, and was chairman from 1953 to 1955, a distinction rarely granted to a solicitor.

Exeter University awarded him the honorary degree of DLitt in 1959.

Foot also built up a library of over 70,000 books at his home near Callington and would wake at five in the morning in order to read them. In old age he taught himself Greek, so as to read the New Testament in the original.

== Personal life ==
Foot was married to Eva Mackintosh, daughter of Angus Mackintosh. Eva died in 1946. Foot married Catherine Elizabeth Taylor, née Dawe (born Liskeard 1894) in St Germans in 1951, who survived him.

Four of the Foots' sons followed their father into public life.

- Sir Dingle Mackintosh Foot (1905–1978), a Liberal, later Labour, Member of Parliament and Solicitor General.
- Hugh Mackintosh Foot, Baron Caradon (1907–1990), a senior diplomat and member of the House of Lords.
- John Mackintosh Foot, Baron Foot (1909–1999), Liberal politician and life peer.
- Michael Mackintosh Foot (1913–2010), Labour Member of Parliament and later Leader of the Labour Party (1980–83).

The Foots also had two daughters, Margaret and Jennifer, and one other son, Christopher, who went into the family law practice. Hugh's son, Paul Foot, was a prominent campaigning journalist and political activist, being a member of the Trotskyist Socialist Workers Party (SWP).

He died on 13 December 1960 in his sleep at his home in Callington, Cornwall, England. He was 80.

Parliament of the United Kingdom
Preceded by Charles Hanson	Member of Parliament for Bodmin; 1922–1924	Succeeded by Gerald Harrison
Preceded by Gerald Harrison	Member of Parliament for Bodmin; 1929–1935	Succeeded by John Rathbone
Party political offices
Preceded by Violet Bonham-Carter	President of the Liberal Party; 1947–1948	Succeeded by Elliott Dodds
