= Hugh Foot, Baron Caradon =

English colonial administrator and diplomat (1907–1990)

The Right Honourable The Lord Caradon GCMG KCVO OBE PC

Permanent Representative of the United Kingdom to the United Nations
- In office 16 October 1964 – 19 June 1970
- Monarch: Elizabeth II
- Preceded by: Sir Patrick Dean
- Succeeded by: Sir Colin Crowe

Minister of State for Foreign and Commonwealth Affairs Foreign Affairs (1964–1968)
- In office 16 October 1964 – 19 June 1970
- Prime Minister: Harold Wilson
- Preceded by: The Earl of Dundee; Peter Thomas
- Succeeded by: Joseph Godber; Richard Wood

Member of the House of Lords Lord Temporal
- In office 27 October 1964 – 5 September 1990; Life Peerage

Governor of Cyprus
- In office 3 December 1957 – 16 August 1960
- Monarch: Elizabeth II
- Prime Minister: Harold Macmillan
- Preceded by: Sir John Harding
- Succeeded by: Cyprus gained independence

Governor of Jamaica
- In office 7 April 1951 – 18 November 1957
- Monarchs: George VI; Elizabeth II
- Prime Minister: Sir Winston Churchill; Sir Anthony Eden; Harold Macmillan
- Preceded by: Sir John Huggins
- Succeeded by: Sir Kenneth Blackburne

Personal details
- Born: 8 October 1907 Plymouth, England
- Died: 5 September 1990 (aged 82) Plymouth, England
- Spouse: Florence Sylvia Tod (m. 1936; died 1985)
- Children: Paul, Sarah, Oliver, and Benjamin
- Parent(s): Isaac Foot; Eva Mackintosh
- Relatives: Sir Dingle Foot (brother); The Lord Foot (brother); Michael Foot (brother); John Foot (grandson)
- Education: Leighton Park School
- Alma mater: St John's College, Cambridge

Hugh Mackintosh Foot, Baron Caradon GCMG KCVO OBE PC (8 October 1907 – 5 September 1990) was an English colonial administrator and diplomat who was Permanent Representative of the United Kingdom to the United Nations and the last governor of British Cyprus.

== Early life and education ==
Hugh Mackintosh Foot was born in Plymouth on 8 October 1907. He was educated at Leighton Park School in Reading, Berkshire, and went on to study at St John's College, Cambridge, where he graduated with a Bachelor of Arts degree in 1929. He was president of the Cambridge Union and also of the Cambridge University Liberal Club. His three politically active brothers, Dingle, John and Michael, were all educated at Oxford and all became presidents of the Oxford Union.

== Career ==
Hugh Foot's career in the diplomatic service was both long and distinguished. In Mandatory Palestine, he served as the assistant district commissioner for the Nablus region. During the Second World War he was appointed as British Military Administrator of Cyrenaica, and served as Colonial Secretary of Cyprus from 1943 to 1945. After the War, he served as Colonial Secretary of Jamaica, 1945–47, Chief Secretary for Nigeria, 1947–50 and was appointed to be the Captain-General and Governor-in-Chief of Jamaica in 1951, a post he held until 1957.

He returned to Cyprus as the last colonial Governor and Commander in Chief on 3 December 1957 until 1960, when Cyprus gained independence. In 1961, he became British Ambassador to the United Nations Trusteeship Council. After the Labour Party won the 1964 general election, Foot became Minister of State for Foreign Affairs and Permanent Representatives from the United Kingdom to the United Nations from 1964 to 1970. Caradon worked with Charles W. Yost on the Four Power United Nations Middle East negotiations. During his tenure as Permanent Representative, he was sworn of the Privy Council in the 1968 New Year Honours. After his retirement, he became a visiting fellow at Harvard University and Princeton University.

In 1964 Foot was granted a life peerage as Baron Caradon, of St Cleer in the County of Cornwall, the title referring to Caradon Hill on Bodmin Moor, not far from Trematon Castle, which was his country home. He jokingly claimed to be glad to be divested of the surname "Foot", which he considered a standing invitation to wags, as he liked to illustrate by recalling a telegram his father received on his election to parliament: "Foot, congratulations on your feat!" Foot was an active freemason.

== Honours and arms ==
Foot was appointed Officer of the Order of the British Empire (OBE) in the 1939 New Year Honours and elevated Companion of the Order of St Michael and St George (CMG) in the 1946 Birthday Honours. He was elevated Knight Commander of the Order of St Michael and St George (KCMG) in the 1951 New Year Honours and was appointed Knight Commander of the Royal Victorian Order (KCVO) on 27 November 1953. In the 1957 Birthday Honours, he was elevated a Knight Grand Cross of the Order of St Michael and St George (GCMG).

Coat of arms of Hugh Foot, Baron Caradon
Crest Perching on a Tower Sable supported by two Lions' Gambs erect Gules a Cornish Chough proper Escutcheon Or on a Chevron engrailed Sable between three Lions' Gambs erect and erased Gules three Wheels Or Supporters On either side an African Lion proper charged on the shoulder with the Head of a Trident Or within a Wreath a two Olive Branches leaved and the Stems crossed in saltire Argent, the whole on a Compartment of Rock in the middle thereof a Pit proper Motto Pro lege et libertate (For law and liberty)

== Family ==
He was one of the four sons of the Liberal Member of Parliament Isaac Foot, his three brothers being the politician Sir Dingle Foot, the life peer Lord Foot, and the journalist and Labour Party leader Michael Foot. "We were proud to be nonconformists and Roundheads", Caradon once wrote of his family: "Oliver Cromwell was our hero and John Milton our poet."

Foot married Florence Sylvia Tod in 1936. She predeceased him in 1985. They had three sons and a daughter together:

- Hon. Paul Mackintosh Foot (8 November 1937 – 18 July 2004), a journalist
- Hon. Sarah Dingle Foot (24 September 1939 – 28 February 2015), also a journalist
- Hon. Oliver Isaac Foot (19 September 1946 – 6 February 2008), a charity worker who led Project Orbis International
- Hon. Benjamin Arthur Foot (born 19 August 1949)

Foot died in Plymouth, aged 82, on 5 September 1990. He was survived by his four children.

== Works ==
- Lord Caradon, "The Obligation of Optimism", Conspectus of History 1.8 (1982): 1–9.
- Sir Hugh Foot, A Start in Freedom (Hodder & Stoughton, 1964) - autobiography
- Sylvia Foot, Emergency Exit (Chatto & Windus, 1960) - memoir by his wife

Government offices
Preceded by Sir John Huggins	Governor of Jamaica; 1951–1957	Succeeded by Sir Kenneth Blackburne
Preceded by John Harding	Governor of Cyprus; 1957–1960	Cyprus became independent
