= Paul Foot (journalist) =

British journalist (1937–2004)

- Born: Paul Mackintosh Foot; 8 November 1937; Haifa, Mandatory Palestine
- Died: 18 July 2004 (aged 66); Stansted Mountfitchet, England
- Resting place: Highgate Cemetery
- Education: Shrewsbury School; University College, Oxford
- Occupations: Investigative journalist, campaigner, author
- Political party: Socialist Workers Party
- Spouses: Monica Beckinsale (m. 1962–1970) Rose Roseanne Harvey (m. 1971–1993)
- Partner: Clare Fermont (?–?)
- Children: 4, including John
- Parents: Hugh Foot, Baron Caradon (father); Florence Sylvia Tod (mother)
- Relatives: Sarah Foot (sister); Oliver Foot (brother); Isaac Foot (grandfather); Sir Dingle Foot (uncle); The Lord Foot (uncle); Michael Foot (uncle)

Paul Mackintosh Foot (8 November 1937 – 18 July 2004) was a British investigative journalist, political campaigner, author, and long-term member of the Socialist Workers Party (SWP).

== Early life and education ==
Foot was born in Haifa during the British mandate.

He was the son of Sir Hugh Foot (who was the last Governor of Cyprus and Jamaica and, as Lord Caradon, the Permanent Representative of the United Kingdom to the United Nations from 1964 to 1970) and the grandson of Isaac Foot, who had been a Liberal MP. He was a nephew of Michael Foot, later leader of the Labour Party, to whom the younger Foot was close. He spent his youth at his uncle's house in Devon, in Italy with his grandmother and with his parents (who lived abroad) in Cyprus and Jamaica.

He was sent to what he described as "a ludicrously snobbish preparatory school (Ludgrove) and an only slightly less absurd public school, Shrewsbury". Contemporaries at Shrewsbury included Richard Ingrams, Willie Rushton, Christopher Booker, and several other friends with whom he later become involved in Private Eye.

Anthony Chenevix-Trench, later the Headmaster of Eton College, was Foot's Housemaster at Shrewsbury School between 1952 and 1955, a time when corporal punishment in all schools was commonplace. In adult life, Foot exposed the ritual beatings that Chenevix-Trench had given. Nick Cohen wrote in Foot's obituary in The Observer:

"Even by the standards of England's public schools, Anthony Chenevix-Trench, his housemaster at Shrewsbury, was a flagellomaniac. Foot recalled, 'He would offer his culprit an alternative: four strokes with the cane, which hurt; or six with the strap, with trousers down, which didn't. Sensible boys always chose the strap, despite the humiliation, and Trench, quite unable to control his glee, led the way to an upstairs room, which he locked, before hauling down the miscreant's trousers, lying him face down on a couch and lashing out with a belt."

Foot first detailed Chenevix-Trench's behaviour for Private Eye in 1969, an experience described by Cohen as one of Foot's happiest days in journalism.

After his national service in Jamaica as a second lieutenant with the Duke of Cornwall's Light Infantry, Foot was reunited with Ingrams at University College at the University of Oxford, where he read jurisprudence, and wrote for Isis, one of the student publications at the university. He briefly edited Isis, resulting in the publication being temporarily banned by the university authorities after Foot began to publish articles that found fault with university lectures.

== Years in Glasgow ==
Via his uncle, Paul Foot made the acquaintance of Hugh Cudlipp, the editorial director of Mirror Group Newspapers, who offered him a job with the company and Foot joined the Daily Record in Glasgow. He was expected "to sort out the Trots" in his journalism, but instead the experience of living in the Scottish city changed his whole outlook.

Foot met workers from shipyards and engineering firms who had joined the Young Socialists. He read, for the first time, Karl Marx, Vladimir Lenin, Rosa Luxemburg, Leon Trotsky, and the multi-volume biography of Trotsky by Isaac Deutscher.

While living in Glasgow he met Tony Cliff, "an ebullient Palestinian Jew". Cliff argued that Russia was state capitalist and that Russian workers were cut off from economic and political power as much as, if not more than, those in the West. Persuaded by what he heard and saw, in 1963 Foot joined the International Socialists, the group in which Cliff had a leading role, and the organisational forerunner of the Socialist Workers Party (SWP).

"Of all the many lessons I learnt in those three years in Glasgow," he wrote later, "the one which most affected my life was a passing remark by Rosa Luxemburg. She predicted that, however strong people's socialist commitment, as soon as they are involved even to the slightest degree in managing the system on behalf of capitalists, they will be lost to the socialist cause."

Foot covered the 1962 West Lothian by-election as a political reporter for the Daily Record. He asked of the Labour candidate, Tam Dalyell: "How on earth is it that the West Lothian Constituency Labour Party with six coal-mines in the constituency can choose somebody from Eton and King's College, Cambridge, as their candidate?" H. B. Boyne, a political correspondent for the Daily Telegraph, reminded Foot of his own background. The incident did not stop the two men becoming friends.

== Journalism and public career (1964–1978) ==
In 1964, he returned to London and began to work for The Sun, as the trade union newspaper, the Daily Herald, had become, in a department called Probe. The intention was to investigate and publish stories behind the news but the Probe team resigned after six months. "The man in charge turned out to be a former Daily Express City editor."

Foot left to work, part-time, on the Mandrake column on The Sunday Telegraph. He had contributed articles to Private Eye since 1964 but decided, in February 1967, to take a cut in salary and join the staff of the magazine on a full-time basis, working with its editor, Richard Ingrams and Peter Cook, by now in possession of a controlling interest in the magazine. When asked about the decision later, Foot would say he could not resist the prospect of two whole pages with complete freedom to write whatever he liked. "Writing for Private Eye is the only journalism I have ever been engaged in which is pure enjoyment. It is free publishing of the most exhilarating kind."

Foot got on very well with Cook, only realising after the latter's death in 1995 how much they had in common, "We both were born in the same week, into the same sort of family. His father, like mine, was a colonial servant rushing round the world hauling down the imperial flag. Both fathers shipped their eldest sons back to public school education in England. We both spent our school holidays with popular aunts and uncles in the West Country."

Foot's first stint at Private Eye lasted until 1972 when, according to Patrick Marnham, Foot was sacked by Ingrams, who had come to the conclusion that Foot's copy was being unduly influenced by his contacts in the International Socialists. Ingrams has denied this, writing, "It was said at the time that he and I had fallen out over political issues. In fact, we very seldom disagreed about such things, the only tension arising from Paul's belief that whenever there was a strike he had to support the union regardless of any rights or wrongs." In October 1972, he left to join the Socialist Worker, the weekly newspaper of the International Socialists, "confident that a revolution was coming", as he explained decades later. He became editor in 1974. He unsuccessfully fought the Birmingham Stechford by-election in 1977 for the SWP, winning 1 per cent of the vote.

== Career (1978–2004) ==
Six years later he returned to Private Eye but was poached in 1979 by the editor of the Daily Mirror, Mike Molloy, who offered him a weekly investigative page of his own with one condition, that he was not to make propaganda for the SWP. In 1980, Foot began to look into the case of the "Bridgewater Four", who had been convicted the previous year of killing Stourbridge newspaper boy Carl Bridgewater. He repeatedly returned to this case, to the occasional consternation of his editor but believed this practice would lead to new witnesses coming forward. Foot and his colleagues looked through many thousands of pages of evidence and statements. When his book Murder at the Farm: Who killed Carl Bridgewater? was published in 1986, Stephen Sedley wrote in the London Review of Books that Foot had not managed to "answer his own question" but did succeed in demonstrating "that if a jury had known what is now known about the case, it would not have inculpated" the defendants. After nearly 20 years in prison, their convictions were overturned at the Court of Appeal in February 1997 and the three surviving men (one had died in prison) were released.

Foot stayed at the Daily Mirror for 14 years, managing to survive at the paper during the years Robert Maxwell was in control from 1984. Foot wrote in 2000: "Maxwell demeaned everyone who worked for him, myself included, but I was able by sheltering behind the editor to protect myself from his more monstrous excesses." He finally fell out with the new Mirror editor, David Banks, in March 1993, nearly 17 months after Maxwell's death. Banks, he claimed, had accused him of being "mad" and a contemporaneous boardroom coup had introduced, according to Foot, a "systematic campaign of union-busting" at the company. He left the Mirror in 1993 when the paper refused to print articles critical of its new management and placed Foot on sick leave. "This is Stalinist psychiatry," he said at the time. "If you don't agree with us you must be mad." Banks also revealed Foot's salary as £55,000 at the time of the row over the unpublished column, although Foot himself said that it was actually a few thousand less.

Foot rejoined Private Eye, now with Ian Hislop as the magazine's editor, and began his regular column for The Guardian. From 2001, he was a Socialist Alliance candidate for several offices. In the Hackney mayoral election in 2002 he came third, beating the Liberal Democrat candidate. Foot also stood in the London region for the Respect coalition in the 2004 European elections.

Foot's last book, The Vote: How It Was Won and How It Was Undermined, was published posthumously in 2005. His friend and Private Eye colleague Francis Wheen, in his Guardian review, concluded: "Passionate, energetic and invincibly cheerful: the qualities of his final book are also a monument to the man himself."

== Writing ==
Foot wrote Red Shelley (1981), a book that exalted the radical politics of Percy Shelley's poetry. Foot was a bibliophile, following in the steps of his grandfather Isaac and uncle Michael, and was also the author of a publication about the radical union leader A. J. Cook.

== Awards and campaign journalism ==
Paul Foot was named journalist of the year in the What The Papers Say Awards in 1972 and 1989 and campaigning journalist of the year in the 1980 British Press Awards; he won the George Orwell Prize for Journalism in 1995 with Tim Laxton, won the journalist of the decade prize in the What The Papers Say Awards in 2000, and the James Cameron special posthumous Award in 2004.

His best known work was in the form of campaign journalism, including his exposure of corrupt architect John Poulson and, most notably, his prominent role in the campaigns to overturn the convictions of the Birmingham Six, which eventually succeeded in 1991. Foot also said that a former British intelligence officer, Colin Wallace, had been framed for manslaughter with a view to suppressing Wallace's allegations of collusion between British forces and Loyalist paramilitaries in Northern Ireland during the 1970s.

Foot took a particular interest in the conviction of Abdelbaset al-Megrahi for the Lockerbie bombing, firmly believing Megrahi to have been a victim of a miscarriage of justice at the Pan Am Flight 103 bombing trial.

He also worked, though without success, to gain a posthumous pardon for James Hanratty, who was hanged in 1962 for the A6 murder. It was a position he maintained even after DNA evidence in 1999 confirmed Hanratty's guilt.

== Personal life ==
Paul Foot was married twice, to Monica (née Beckinsale, 1962–70) and Rose (Roseanne, née Harvey, 1971–93) and had a long-term relationship with Clare Fermont. He had two sons by his first wife, one son by his second, and a daughter by his relationship with Fermont: John Foot is an academic and writer specialising in Italy, Matt Foot is a solicitor, and Tom Foot is a journalist. With Fermont, Foot had a daughter, Kate.

Foot was an admirer of West Indian cricket and a supporter of Plymouth Argyle Football Club. He was also a batsman and golfer.

== Death and memorials ==
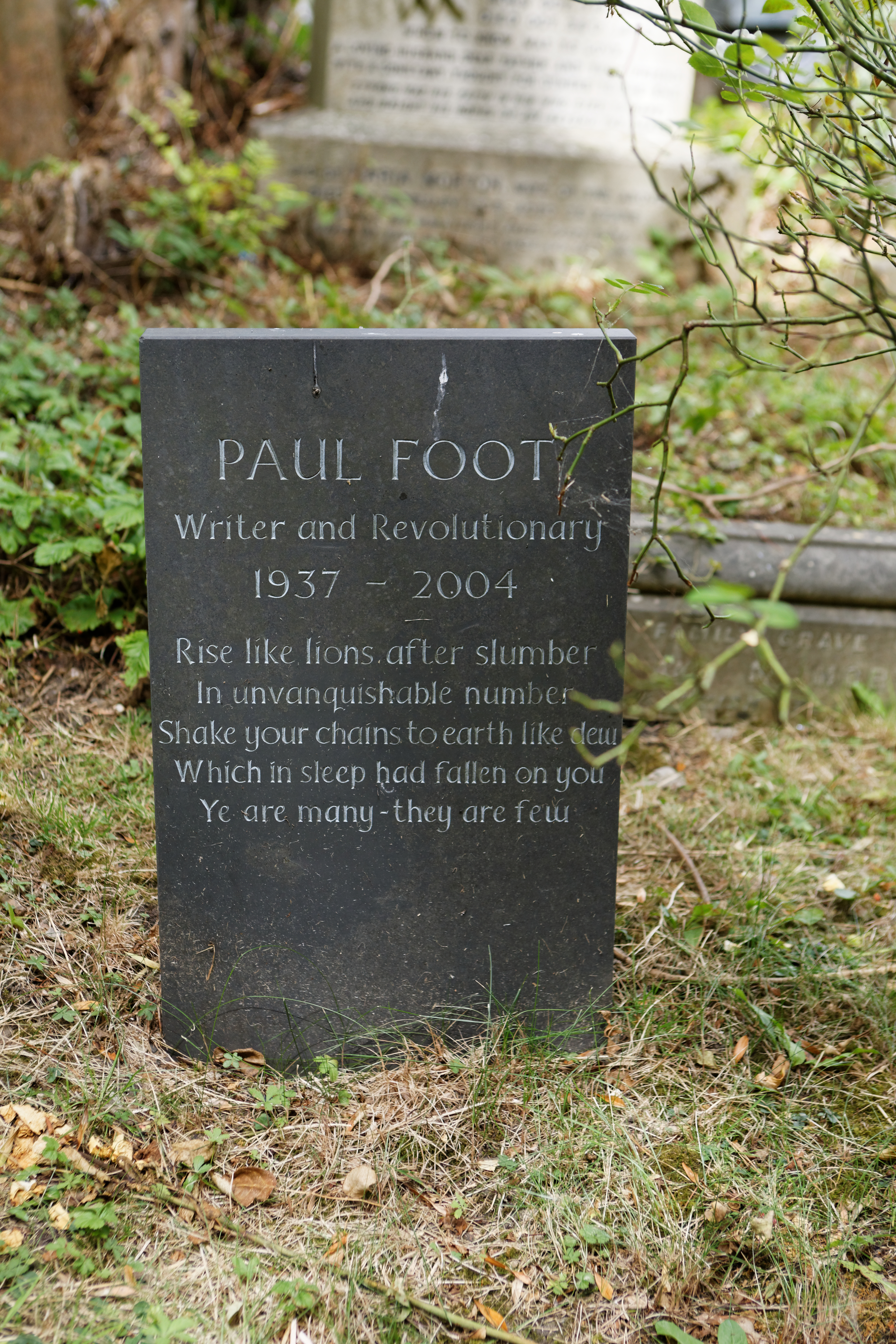
Foot's gravestone in Highgate Cemetery. The epitaph is from The Masque of Anarchy by Percy Bysshe Shelley.

Paul Foot died of a heart attack at the age of 66. A tribute issue of the Socialist Review, on whose editorial board Foot sat for 19 years, collected together many of his articles, while issue 1116 of Private Eye included a tribute to Foot from the many people with whom he had worked. Three months after his death, on 10 October 2004, there was a full house at the Hackney Empire in London for an evening's celebration of his life. The following year, The Guardian and Private Eye jointly set up the Paul Foot Award for investigative or campaigning journalism, with an annual £10,000 prize fund.

Foot is buried in Highgate Cemetery, London, near Karl Marx's tomb, with the grave of Chris Harman, another long-time SWP member, adjacent to Foot's.

== Publications ==
- Unemployment – the Socialist Answer (1963), Glasgow: The Labour Worker.
- Immigration and Race in British Politics (1965), Harmondsworth: Penguin Books.
- The Politics of Harold Wilson (1968), Harmondsworth: Penguin Books.
- The Rise of Enoch Powell: An Examination of Enoch Powell’s Attitude to Immigration and Race (1969), London: Cornmarket Press, ISBN 0-7191-9017-7.
- Who Killed Hanratty? (1971), London: Cape, ISBN 0-224-00546-4.
- The Postal Workers and the Tory offensive (1971), London: International Socialists.
- Workers Against Racism (1973), England: International Socialists.
- Stop the Cuts (1976), London: Rank and File Organising Committee.
- Why You Should Be a Socialist: The Case For the New Socialist Workers Party (1977), London: Socialist Workers Party, ISBN 0-905998-01-4.
- Red Shelley (1981), London: Sidgwick and Jackson, ISBN 0-283-98679-4.
- This Bright Day of Summer: The Peasants' Revolt of 1381 (1981), London: Socialists Unlimited, ISBN 0-905998-22-7.
- Three Letters to a Bennite (1982), London: Socialist Workers Party, ISBN 0-905998-29-4.
- The Helen Smith Story (1983), Glasgow: Fontana, ISBN 0-00-636536-1 (with Ron Smith).
- 'An Agitator of the Worst Type': A Portrait of Miners' Leader A.J. Cook (1986), London: Socialist Workers Party, ISBN 0-905998-51-0.
- Murder at the Farm: Who Killed Carl Bridgewater? (1986), London: Sidgwick & Jackson, ISBN 0-283-99165-8.
- Ireland: Why Britain Must Get Out (1989), London: Chatto & Windus, ISBN 0-7011-3548-4.
- Who Framed Colin Wallace? (1989), London: Macmillan, ISBN 0-333-47008-7.
- The Case for Socialism: What the Socialist Workers Party Stands For (1990), London: Bookmarks, ISBN 0-905998-74-X.
- Words as Weapons: Selected Writing 1980–1990 (1990), London: Verso, ISBN 0-86091-310-4/0860915271.
- "David Widgery (obituary)". New Left Review. I (196). New Left Review. November–December 1992.
- "Inspiring Memory". Socialist Worker: 49–50. 12 December 1992. (Obituary of David Widgery.)
- Articles of Resistance (2000), London: Bookmarks, ISBN 1-898876-64-9.
- Why You Should Vote Socialist (2001), London: Bookmarks. ISBN 1 898876 77 0.
- Lockerbie: The Flight from Justice (2001), London: Private Eye Special Issue.
- The Vote: How It Was Won and How It Was Undermined (2005), London: Viking, ISBN 0-670-91536-X.
- Orwell & 1984: A Talk by Paul Foot (2021), London: Redwords, ISBN 9781912926503
- Toussaint Louverture and the Haitian Revolution: Two Talks by Paul Foot (2021), London: Redwords, ISBN 9781914143311.
- The British Library Catalogue

== See also ==
- Alternative theories of the bombing of Pan Am Flight 103

Media offices
Preceded by Roger Protz	Editor of Socialist Worker; 1974–1978	Succeeded by Chris Harman
