= Oliver Foot =

British charity worker

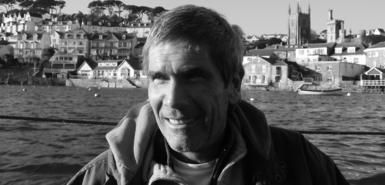
Oliver Isaac Foot

The Honourable Oliver Isaac Foot (19 September 1946 – 6 February 2008) was a British actor, philanthropist and charity worker.

== Early life ==
Oliver Foot was born on 19 September 1946, the son of Hugh Foot, (later Baron Caradon, Jamaica's last British Colonial Secretary), and Florence Sylvia Tod. He was the younger brother of journalists Paul Foot and Sarah Foot, and nephew of the former leader of the British Labour Party, Michael Foot, Labour government minister Sir Dingle Foot and Liberal peer Lord John Foot. Oliver was a lifelong socialist.

After leaving Leighton Park School, he read English at Goddard College, Vermont before returning to England to attend a drama studio in Ealing, west London.

== Career ==
=== Footsbarn Theatre ===
In 1971, Foot, with his wife Nancy and a group of other friends, set up the Footsbarn Theatre Company using a barn near Liskeard, Cornwall, for rehearsals – hence the name, "Footsbarn".

=== Christian faith ===
In the mid-1970s, Foot became a born-again Christian while staying with the L'Abri Fellowship in Hampshire. He was a member of Grace Community Church in Morval, near Looe in Cornwall.

=== Orbis ===
Foot was a long-standing supporter of ORBIS International, the flying eye hospital, and was the chief executive from 1982 to 1987, becoming president from 1987 to 1995 and again from 2004 to his death in 2008.

=== Air Jamaica and Sandals ===
After his departure from Orbis, Foot worked for Air Jamaica and Sandals Resorts as a Vice-President of Public Affairs from 1996 to 2004. Splitting his time between Jamaica and the UK, Foot used his contacts in the press to significantly raise the profile of Air Jamaica, Sandals and Jamaica at large to the people of the UK.

=== Jamaica Blue ===
During 1998, in partnership with the Jamaican Government, Foot started a chain of coffee shops called Jamaica Blue Mountain Coffee Shops Limited (Jamaica Blue). The first location opened in Mayfair, London, in mid-January 1999. Jamaica Blue sold and used Jamaican Blue Mountain Coffee and served locally supplied Jamaican foods, cakes and crafts; Air Jamaica transported all the coffee at a discount price and flew out shipments of Jamaica's own St Catherine's peak spring water.

Most of the staff were of Jamaican descent or had a Jamaican connection. Foot set up the shop, not to make money, but to help the small coffee farmers in Jamaica, who were suffering due to a surplus of Blue Mountain coffee created by financial instability in Japan, the main purchaser of Jamaican Blue Mountain Coffee. In the end, the location was poorly chosen and the overheads were too high. Jamaica Blue closed in 2001.

== Death ==
Foot died, aged 61, in hospital in South London due to heart failure.
