= Foot Lake =

Lake in the state of Minnesota, United States

- Location within Minnesota
- Location: Kandiyohi County, Minnesota
- Coordinates: 45°7′56″N 95°3′37″W
- Type: lake

Foot Lake is a lake in Kandiyohi County, in the U.S. state of Minnesota.

Foot Lake was named for Solomon R. Foot, a pioneer settler.

== See also ==
- List of lakes in Minnesota
