= Sarah Foot (journalist) =

British journalist and author

Sarah Dingle Foot (24 September 1939 – 28 February 2015) was a British journalist and author, the daughter of Hugh Foot. She wrote a number of books about Cornwall, including Following the River Fowey, 1985 (enlarged as Fowey, River and Town); My Grandfather, Isaac Foot was an intimate family memoir about the Liberal politician Isaac Foot.
