= Records of members of parliament of the United Kingdom =

This article about records of members of parliament of the United Kingdom and of England includes a variety of lists of MPs by age, period and other circumstances of service, familiar sets, ethnic or religious minorities, physical attributes, and circumstances of their deaths.

== Age ==
=== Youngest ===
Prior to the Acts of Union, the youngest known person to have sat in the House of Commons of England was Christopher Monck, elected MP for Devon in 1667, "probably without a contest", at the age of 13. He sat in the House for three years, before being elevated to the House of Lords upon his father's death. He is said to have been "moderately active during his short period of membership, sitting on seven committees".

Monck was one of many members returned underage in the late seventeenth century, with around ten underage members in each of the Parliaments of 1690 and 1695, many aristocrats. In response to this, the Parliamentary Elections Act 1695 established 21 as the minimum age, although this was not reliably enforced. Until the Reform Act 1832, underage MPs were seldom unseated. For example, Charles James Fox became an MP aged 19 in 1768, and Robert Jocelyn, Viscount Jocelyn, became an MP aged 18 in 1806.

Before the general election of 2015, the youngest MP since the Reform Act 1832 was William Charles Wentworth-FitzWilliam, elected at Malton in the 1832 general election aged 20 and 11 months. His election, whilst theoretically illegal, was unchallenged; Malton was a pocket borough controlled by his family, and the matter was viewed as academic as he would be of full age by the time Parliament assembled.

After Wentworth-FitzWilliam, the youngest MP elected was James Dickson, who was elected as a Liberal at a by-election for the Borough of Dungannon on 25 June 1880. He was born on 19 April 1859, and so was aged 21 years 67 days. The youngest female MP was Bernadette Devlin, elected on 17 April 1969 from Mid Ulster, aged 21 years 359 days. Until 1970, the minimum age to sit in parliament was 21. In 1970, the minimum age was lowered to 18. Both records are now jointly held by Mhairi Black, who was aged 20 years and 237 days old at the time of her election to the seat of Paisley and Renfrewshire South in the 2015 general election.

=== Oldest ===
The oldest serving MP whose exact dates are known was Samuel Young (1822–1918), who was MP for East Cavan from 1892 (when aged 70), until his death at the age of 96 years 63 days.

=== Oldest debuts ===
Perhaps the oldest parliamentary debut of all time was that of Warren Lisle, believed born in 1695, who was elected on 7 September 1780 during that year's general election as MP for Weymouth and Melcombe Regis as locum tenens, aged reportedly 85. He stood down on 21 November to allow his kinsman, Gabriel Steward, to stand for the seat after completing his own term as mayor of the borough (when he had been the local returning officer). He died in July 1788 aged reportedly 93.

The oldest debut where a confirmed birth date is known was made by Sir Robert Pullar (born 18 February 1828) who was elected at an unopposed by-election for Perth on 12 February 1907 aged 78 years and 359 days. He retired at the January 1910 general election.

The oldest debut at a general election to the UK Parliament was possibly by Bernard Kelly (born 1808) who was elected MP for South Donegal in 1885 in the year of his 77th birthday. He died in office on 1 January 1887 aged 78.

The oldest woman at first entry to the Commons was Dr Ethel Bentham (born 5 January 1861) who was elected MP for Islington East at the 1929 general election aged 68 years and 145 days. She died in office, the first woman to do so, in 1931.

Jim Allister was the oldest MP first elected at the last general election, the 2024 general election, at age 71.

=== List of oldest sitting MPs since 1945 ===
Name	Born	Became oldest MP	Left House	Age on leaving	Died	Political party	Highest office held
Murdoch Macdonald	6 May 1866	1945	1950	83 ^{2}	24 April 1957	Liberal	
David Logan	22 November 1871	1950	Feb 1964	92 ^{1}	25 February 1964	Labour	
Winston Churchill ^{F}	30 November 1874	Feb 1964	Sep 1964	89 ^{2}	24 January 1965	Conservative	Prime Minister of the United Kingdom
Emanuel Shinwell	18 October 1884	Sep 1964	1970	85 ^{2}	8 May 1986	Labour	Minister of Defence
S. O. Davies	probably 9 November 1879	1970	1972	92 ^{1}	25 February 1972	Labour	
John Rankin	1 February 1890	1972	1973	83 ^{1}	8 October 1973	Labour	
Irene Ward	23 February 1895	1973	Feb 1974	79 ^{2}	26 April 1980	Conservative	
David Weitzman	18 June 1898	Feb 1974	1979	80 ^{2}	6 May 1987	Labour	
Robert Edwards	16 January 1905	1979	1987	82 ^{2}	4 June 1990	Labour	
Michael Foot	23 July 1913	1987	1992	78 ^{2}	3 March 2010	Labour	Leader of the Opposition
Edward Heath ^{F}	9 July 1916	1992	2001	84 ^{2}	17 July 2005	Conservative	Prime Minister of the United Kingdom
Piara Khabra	20 November 1921	2001	2007	85 ^{1}	21 June 2007	Labour	
Ian Paisley	6 April 1926	2007	2010	84 ^{2}	12 September 2014	Democratic Unionist Party	First Minister of Northern Ireland
Peter Tapsell ^{F}	1 February 1930	2010	2015	85 ^{2}	18 August 2018	Conservative	
Gerald Kaufman ^{F}	21 June 1930	2015	2017	86 ^{1}	26 February 2017	Labour	Shadow Foreign Secretary
Dennis Skinner	11 February 1932	2017	2019	87 ^{3}	living	Labour	
Bill Cash	10 May 1940	2019	2024	84 ^{2}	living	Conservative	
Roger Gale	20 August 1943	2024	present	Incumbent aged 82	living	Conservative	

Notes:

^{F} Also Father of the House (not necessarily contemporaneous with seniority)
^{1} Died in office
^{2} Retired
^{3} Defeated when seeking re-election

=== Longest-lived MP ===
==== Oldest living former MP, since 1974 ====
Name	Born	Tenure as MP	Died	Age	Political party
Harry Brittain	24 December 1873	1918–29	9 July 1974	100 years, 197 days	Conservative
Charles Ponsonby	2 September 1879	1935–50	28 January 1976	96 years, 148 days	Conservative
George Schuster	25 April 1881	1938–45	5 June 1982	101 years, 41 days	Liberal
Hugh O'Neill	8 June 1883	1915–52	28 November 1982	99 years, 173 days	Irish Unionist; Ulster Unionist
Manny Shinwell	18 October 1884	1922–24; 1928–31; 1935–70	8 May 1986	101 years, 202 days	Labour
Fenner Brockway	1 November 1888	1929–31; 1950–64	28 April 1988	99 years, 179 days	Labour
William Paling	28 October 1892	1945–59	10 April 1992	99 years, 165 days	Labour
Edgar Granville	12 February 1898	1929–51	14 February 1998	100 years, 2 days	Liberal; National Liberal; Independent; Labour
Jack Oldfield	5 July 1899	1929–31	11 December 1999	100 years, 159 days	Labour; Conservative
Hartley Shawcross	4 February 1902	1945–58	10 July 2003	101 years, 156 days	Labour
George Wallace	18 April 1906	1945–50; 1964–74	11 November 2003	97 years, 207 days	Labour
Bert Hazell	18 April 1907	1964–70	11 January 2009	101 years, 268 days	Labour
James Allason	6 September 1912	1959–74	16 June 2011	98 years, 283 days	Conservative
Edward Short	17 December 1912	1951–76	4 May 2012	99 years, 139 days	Labour
Morgan Morgan-Giles	19 June 1914	1964–79	4 May 2013	98 years, 319 days	Conservative
John Freeman	19 February 1915	1945–55	20 December 2014	99 years, 304 days	Labour
Ronald Atkins	13 June 1916	1966–70; 1974–79	30 December 2020	104 years, 200 days	Labour
Patrick Duffy	17 June 1920	1963–66; 1970–92	2 January 2026	105 years, 199 days	Labour
Elizabeth Shields	27 February 1928	1986–87	Living	98 years, 256 days	Liberal

Although his alleged birth year predates parish registers and civil birth registration, William Badger, who was member for Winchester in the 1597 parliament of England, is supported by a History of Parliament biographer to have been a centenarian, being established to have been born 'circa 1523' and to have been buried on 18 January 1629, aged at least 105 years.

Sir Patrick Duffy (17 June 1920 – 2 January 2026), the member for Colne Valley from 1963 to 1966 and for Sheffield Attercliffe from 1970 to 1992, was the oldest living former MP since the death of Ronald Atkins in December 2020, and the oldest ever former MP with a known birth date since surpassing Atkins in January 2025 until his death in January 2026.

Ronald Atkins (13 June 1916 – 30 December 2020), member for Preston North from 1966 to 1970 and from 1974 to 1979 was, between 2018 and 2025, the longest-lived former MP whose birth date is registered. On 30 August 2018, he surpassed the previous record set by Theodore Cooke Taylor (3 August 1850 – 19 October 1952), member for Radcliffe-cum-Farnworth from 1900 to 1918, who had lived to be 102 years and 77 days old. Atkins died aged 104 years and 200 days old. His record was surpassed on 3 January 2025 by Sir Patrick Duffy.

Other ex-MPs who have reached their centenary are Nathaniel Micklem (1853–1954), Sir Harry Brittain (1873–1974), Sir George Ernest Schuster (1881–1982), Manny Shinwell (1884–1986), Edgar Granville (1898–1998), Jack Oldfield (1899–1999, who outlived his parliamentary service by 68 years), Hartley Shawcross (1902–2003), Bert Hazell (1907–2009), and Michael Shaw (1920–2021).

Frank James, who was elected MP for Walsall at the 1892 general election, but unseated on petition in November that year, died at 102 years and 135 days old; James's record was surpassed by Atkins on 27 October 2018.

Jill Knight (9 July 1923 – 6 April 2022) was the longest lived former woman MP, aged 98 years, 271 days.

As of 2026 Elizabeth Shields is the oldest living female former MP (born 27 February 1928, age 98 years, 256 days). As of 2 January 2026, upon the death of Sir Patrick Duffy, she is the oldest living former MP. This is the first time that a woman has been the oldest living former MP.

Stratton Mills (born 1 July 1932, age 94 years, 132 days), who was elected MP for Belfast North at the 1959 general election, is the earliest elected former MP still living. Mills was sworn in on 22 October that year.

The oldest former prime minister was James Callaghan (27 March 1912 – 26 March 2005), who died the day before his 93rd birthday. The oldest living former prime minister is John Major, (born 29 March 1943, age 83 years, 226 days).

=== Shortest-lived MPs ===
One known contender for this record for whom both birth and death dates are known, in the Parliament of England, was James Wriothesley, Lord Wriothesley, who while still a minor was MP for Callington in 1621–1622, and for Winchester from early in 1624 until his death from illness on military service in the Netherlands on 1 November 1624 aged 19 years and 251 days.

Based only on evidence from his university entrance records, Peter Legh, MP for Newton from 1640, may have been aged 19 or younger when he died after a duel on 2 February 1642, but his precise birthdate is not known.

Geoffrey Palmer, MP for Ludgershall from March 1660, died in office on 31 October 1661 aged 19 years and at least 245 days, based on his baptism registration (28 February 1642).

After the setting of the youngest age of candidacy at 21, the youngest MP to die in office was George Charles Grey who was elected MP for Berwick-upon-Tweed in 1941 and was killed in action on 30 July 1944 aged 25 years 240 days. Throughout this period he was the Baby of the House.

The shortest-lived female MP, Lady Cynthia Mosley, MP for Stoke 1929–1931, died in 1933 aged 34. The youngest female MP to die in office was Jo Cox, MP for Batley and Spen since 2015, who was murdered on 16 June 2016, 6 days before her 42nd birthday.

The shortest-lived former prime minister was William Cavendish, 4th Duke of Devonshire (8 May 1720 – 2 October 1764), who was aged 44 years, 147 days upon his death. The youngest living former prime minister is Rishi Sunak, (born 12 May 1980, age 46 years, 182 days).

== Period of service ==
=== Longest ===
Sir Francis Knollys (also the oldest ever sitting MP) was first elected as MP for Oxford in 1575 at the age of around 25 and was MP for Reading at the time of his death in 1648, a period spanning 73 years, although there were eight periods, amounting to 27 entire years (1590–1592, 1594–1596, 1599–1600, 1602–1603, 1605–1613, 1615–1619, 1627 and 1630–1639) in which the Parliament of England did not meet, and his period of service totalled little more than 23 years.

The longest span of service of an MP since the start of the 20th century was Winston Churchill who was first elected on 1 October 1900 and left the House of Commons on 25 September 1964, a period of 63 years 360 days. His service was not continuous, as he was not an MP for a spell in 1908 and between 1922 and 1924.

Charles Pelham Villiers was the longest continuously serving MP. He was elected in 1835 and remained an MP continuously for over 62 years until his death on 16 January 1898, aged 96 years 13 days. Since the start of the 20th century, the longest continuous service by an MP has been 51 years 80 days by Edward Heath, who sat from 1950 to 2001.

The longest continuous service record for a female MP is held by Harriet Harman, first elected in October 1982. The longest total service record for a female MP is held by Dame Margaret Beckett, who served for 4 years and 7 months between 1974 and 1979 and was then re-elected in June 1983. Beckett also holds the record for the longest span of service for a woman. Both Harman and Beckett left the House of Commons on 30 May 2024.

=== Shortest ===
There are cases of MPs being elected posthumously; Edward Legge (1710–1747) was elected unopposed as MP for Portsmouth on 15 December 1747, four days before news arrived that he had died 87 days previously in the West Indies. In 1780 John Kirkman was elected as MP for the City of London despite dying before polls closed.

In more recent times, members have died after polling, but before the declaration of the results. In 1906, Thomas Higgins was declared elected for the seat of North Galway, even though he had died earlier that morning, after polling day. More recently, in 1945 Sir Edward Taswell Campbell at Bromley and Leslie Pym at Monmouth died after polling, but nine days before the declaration of the results. Both were declared elected posthumously, and both had been MPs for a number of years. Noel Skelton is another example in 1935.

The shortest non-posthumous service was that of Alfred Dobbs, who was declared elected MP for Smethwick on 26 July 1945 and was killed the following day in a car accident on the way to take his seat.

The shortest service for women MPs has been 92 days in the case of both Ruth Dalton, who was MP for Bishop Auckland from a by-election on 7 February 1929 to dissolution of Parliament on 10 May 1929 prior to that year's general election, and Margo MacDonald, who was MP for Glasgow Govan from a by-election on 8 November 1973 until the dissolution of Parliament on 8 February 1974 prior to the coming general election.

==== Shortest total service since 1900 ====
For a comprehensive list of MPs since 1900 with less than 365 days total service see:

- List of United Kingdom MPs with the shortest service

=== Members who never took their seats ===
- Pat Cullen (Note: Abstentionist) 2024–
- Dáire Hughes 2024–
- Cathal Mallaghan 2024–
- John Finucane 2019–
- Órfhlaith Begley 2018–
- Chris Hazzard 2017–
- Elisha McCallion 2017–2019
- Barry McElduff 2017–2018
- Mickey Brady 2015–2024
- Francie Molloy 2013–2024
- Paul Maskey 2011–
- Michelle Gildernew 2001–2015, 2017–2024
- Pat Doherty 2001–2017
- Conor Murphy 2005–2015
- Martin McGuinness 1997–2013
- Gerry Adams 1983–1992, 1997–2011
- Owen Carron 1981–1983
- Bobby Sands (Note: In prison at time of election) (Note: Died before taking seat) 1981
- Philip Clarke (Note: Ruled ineligible) 1955
- Tom Mitchell 1955
- Alfred Dobbs 1945
- Joseph Bell 1922
- Harry Wrightson 1918–1919
- 69 Sinn Féin Members elected at the 1918 general election (including 6 first elected in by-elections 1917–1918)
- James Annand 1906
- Thomas Higgins (Note: Elected posthumously) 1906
- Henry Compton (Note: By-election win was superseded by their subsequent general election loss, without Parliament sitting in the meantime) 1905–1906 (shortest serving MP – 46 days – whose tenure was not ended by his death)
- Joseph Andrews 1905–1906

== MPs who never won an election ==
On rare occasions the election winner may be disqualified, either by an election court or by the House of Commons, and the seat awarded to the runner-up.

Malcolm St. Clair: Bristol South-East, 1961–1963
Charles Beattie: Mid-Ulster, 1955–1956

== MPs elected to two or more constituencies simultaneously ==
- Charles Stewart Parnell: elected in 1880 General election for three separate seats – Cork City, County Mayo and County Meath.
- Richard Hazleton: from 9 December 1910 until 23 February 1911, when he was unseated on a petition from the second seat, he was MP for North Galway and North Louth.
- At the 1918 election, 4 Sinn Féin candidates were each elected to two seats: Arthur Griffith (Cavan East and Tyrone North West), Éamon de Valera (Clare East and Mayo East), Liam Mellows (Galway East and Meath North) and Eoin MacNeill (Londonderry City and National University of Ireland). However, none of them took their seat in the House of Commons, instead attending the First Dáil.

== MPs who have sat for three or more different constituencies ==
In modern times, it is unusual for an MP to represent more than one or two constituencies during their career, although before the 20th century it was quite common. MPs whose seats were altered purely by boundary changes are not listed.

Michael Ancram: Berwick and East Lothian ^{1}; Edinburgh South ^{1}; Devizes ^{5}
Ralph Assheton: Rushcliffe ^{1}; City of London ^{2}; Blackburn West ^{5}
Walter Ayles: Bristol North^{1}; Southall ^{4}; Hayes and Harlington ^{3}
Kenneth Baker: Acton ^{1}; St. Marylebone ^{2}; Mole Valley ^{5}
Arthur Balfour: Hertford ^{4}; Manchester East ^{1}; City of London ^{1}
Joseph Braithwaite: Hillsborough ^{1}; Holderness ^{2}; Bristol North West ^{1}
James, Lord Brudenell: Marlborough; Fowey ^{2}; North Northamptonshire ^{5}
John Calcraft (the younger): Wareham ^{4}; Rochester ^{4}; Dorset ^{10}
Winston Churchill: Oldham ^{4}; Manchester North West ^{1}; Dundee ^{1}; Epping ^{2} Woodford ^{2}
William Clark: Nottingham South ^{1}; East Surrey ^{4}; Croydon South ^{5}
Roger Conant: Chesterfield ^{1}; Bewdley ^{2}; Rutland and Stamford ^{5}
Mims Davies: Eastleigh ^{4}; Mid Sussex ^{4}; East Grinstead and Uckfield
Geoffrey de Freitas: Nottingham Central ^{4}; Lincoln ^{3}; Kettering ^{5}
Benjamin Disraeli: Maidstone ^{4}; Shrewsbury ^{4}; Buckinghamshire ^{6}
Walter Elliot: Lanark^{1}; Kelvingrove^{1}; Combined Scottish Universities ^{2}; Kelvingrove ^{10}
George Galloway: Glasgow Hillhead/Kelvin ^{4}; Bethnal Green and Bow ^{4}; Bradford West ^{1}; Rochdale ^{1}
William Ewart Gladstone: Newark ^{1}; Oxford University ^{1}; South Lancashire ^{2}; Greenwich ^{4}; Midlothian ^{5}
Thomas Graves: Okehampton ^{4}; Windsor ^{4}; Milborne Port ^{5}
Arthur Griffith-Boscawen: Tunbridge ^{1}; Dudley ^{1}; Taunton ^{1}
Ray Gunter: South-East Essex ^{2}; Doncaster ^{1}; Southwark ^{3}
Edward Hemmerde: East Denbighshire ^{4}; North West Norfolk ^{2}; Crewe ^{1}
Arthur Henderson: Barnard Castle ^{4}; Widnes ^{1}; Newcastle East ^{1}; Burnley ^{1}; Clay Cross ^{10}
Austin Hudson: Islington East ^{1}; Hackney North ^{1}; Lewisham North ^{10}
Roy Jenkins: Southwark Central ^{2}; Birmingham Stechford ^{3}; Glasgow Hillhead ^{1}
Harcourt Johnstone Willesden West ^{1}; South Shields ^{1}; Middlesbrough West ^{10}
William Jowitt: Hartlepool ^{1}; Preston ^{4}; Ashton-under-Lyne ^{6}
Richard Kidston Law: Kingston upon Hull South West ^{1}; Kensington South ^{2}; Haltemprice ^{6}
Geoffrey Lloyd: Birmingham Ladywood ^{1}; Birmingham King's Norton ^{2}; Sutton Coldfield ^{5}
Walter Long: Wiltshire North ^{2}; Devizes ^{1}; Liverpool West Derby ^{4}; Bristol South ^{4}; South Dublin ^{4}; Strand ^{2}; Westminster St George's ^{6}
Sir Manasseh Masseh Lopes: New Romney ^{3}; Evesham ^{9}; Barnstaple ^{9}, Westbury ^{3}
Leonard Lyle: Stratford ^{1}; Epping ^{5}; Bournemouth ^{6}
Charles MacAndrew: Kilmarnock ^{1}; Glasgow Partick ^{4}; Bute and North Ayrshire ^{5}
Ramsay MacDonald: Leicester ^{2}; Aberavon ^{4}; Seaham ^{1}; Combined Scottish Universities ^{10}
James Patrick Mahon: Clare ^{8}; Ennis ^{1}; County Carlow ^{10}
Lord John Manners: Newark ^{1}; Colchester ^{4}; North Leicestershire ^{4}; Melton ^{6}
Frank Markham: Chatham ^{5}; Nottingham South ^{1}; Buckingham ^{5}
Fergus Montgomery: Newcastle East ^{1}; Brierley Hill ^{2}; Altrincham and Sale ^{2}
Hyacinth Morgan: Camberwell North West ^{5}; Rochdale ^{4}; Warrington ^{5}
John Fletcher Moulton: Clapham ^{1} South Hackney ^{1}, Launceston ^{5}
Wilfred Paling: Doncaster ^{1}; Wentworth ^{2}; Dearne Valley ^{5}
Arthur Palmer: Wimbledon ^{1}; Cleveland ^{1}; Bristol Central ^{2}; Bristol North East ^{2}
Sir Robert Peel: Cashel ^{4}; Chippenham ^{4}; Oxford University ^{4}; Westbury ^{4}; Tamworth ^{10}
Charles Simmons: Birmingham Erdington^{1}; Birmingham West ^{2}; Brierley Hill ^{1}
Frank Soskice: Birkenhead East ^{2}; Sheffield Neepsend ^{2}; Newport ^{5}
John Strachey: Aston ^{1}; Dundee ^{2}, Dundee West ^{10}
Earl Gower: St Mawes ^{4}; Newcastle-Under-Lyme ^{4}; Staffordshire ^{5}
Shirley Williams: Hitchin ^{2}; Hertford and Stevenage ^{1}; Crosby ^{1}
John Wilmot: Fulham East ^{1}; Kennington ^{4}; Deptford ^{5}
Sir Joseph Yorke: Reigate ^{7}; Saint Germans ^{3}; Sandwich ^{4} Reigate ^{10}

Notes:

^{1} subsequently defeated
^{2} seat abolished
^{3} resigned
^{4} sought another constituency
^{5} retired
^{6} inherited/raised to peerage
^{7} resigned but returned to constituency at later date
^{8} unseated on petition; elected at a later date, then retired
^{9} unseated for bribery
^{10} died

== MPs who have made more than one comeback ==
In modern times, it is unusual for an MP who has been defeated (or retired e.g. due to their seat being abolished) to achieve more than one comeback to the House of Commons after a period of absence. In the UK Parliament, William Vesey-FitzGerald, Lord Charles Beresford and Arthur Henderson were exceptional in achieving it on no fewer than four occasions each: Vesey-FitzGerald over a span of 18 years through three by-elections and one general election, Beresford over a span of 25 years after voluntarily resigning or retiring from the House at stages of his naval career, Henderson invariably at by-elections following serial general election defeats in other seats, in the shorter span of 14 years. A woman has never come back more than once.

Of living MPs, George Galloway transferred to a different constituency and party in 2005 but did not have any period of absence from the Commons at that time. Having left Parliament in 2010 he made a comeback at a by-election in a third constituency in 2012, was defeated in 2015, then returned at a by-election for a fourth constituency in February 2024 before losing it in the general election the same year.

George Galloway: 2012 ^{b}, 2024 ^{b}
William McCrea: 2000 ^{b}, 2005
Michael Ancram: 1979, 1992
Fergus Montgomery: 1967 ^{b}, October 1974
Tony Benn: 1963 ^{b}, 1984 ^{b}
Arthur Palmer: 1952 ^{b}, 1964
Alec Douglas-Home: 1950, 1963 ^{b}
Frank Soskice: 1950 ^{b}, 1956 ^{b}
Richard Law: 1945 ^{b}, 1951
Hyacinth Morgan: 1940^{b}, 1950^{b}
Frank Markham: 1935, 1951
Sir Herbert Williams: 1932 ^{b}, 1950
Cahir Healy: 1931 ^{b}, 1950
Harold Macmillan: 1931, 1945 ^{b}
Ian Fraser: 1931, 1940 ^{b}
Harcourt Johnstone: 1931, 1940 ^{b}
Cuthbert Headlam: 1931, 1940 ^{b}
Gwilym Lloyd George: 1929, 1951
Walter Ayles: 1929, 1945
Somerville Hastings: 1929, 1945
George Isaacs: 1929, 1939 ^{b}
William Jowitt: 1929, 1939 ^{b}
James Chuter Ede: 1929, 1935
Herbert Morrison: 1929, 1935
Robert Richards: 1929, 1935
Arthur Henderson Jr.: 1929, 1935
Benjamin Walter Gardner: 1929, 1934 ^{b}
Tom Smith: 1929, 1933 ^{b}
William Wedgwood Benn: 1928 ^{b}, 1937 ^{b}
Manny Shinwell: 1928 ^{b}, 1935
Austin Hudson: 1924, 1950
Walter Elliot: 1924, 1946 ^{b}
Edward Cadogan: 1924, 1940 ^{b}
Lord Erskine: 1924, 1940 ^{b}
Tom Johnston: 1924 ^{b}, 1935
Andrew MacLaren: 1924, 1935
Alec Cunningham-Reid: 1924, 1932^{b}
Archibald Boyd-Carpenter: 1924, 1931
Sir Geoffrey Ellis: 1924, 1931
Arthur Evans, 1924, 1931
Park Goff, 1924, 1931
Vivian Henderson: 1924, 1931
George Hume: 1924, 1931
Frank Sanderson: 1924, 1931
Wilfred Sugden: 1924, 1931
Charles Lyle: 1923, 1940 ^{b}
Tom Kennedy: 1923, 1935
Thomas Ellis Naylor: 1923, 1935
Francis Dyke Acland: 1923, 1932 ^{b}
Walter Rea: 1923, 1931
John Edmund Mills: 1923, 1929
Walter Robert Smith: 1923, 1929
Henry Guest: 1922, 1937 ^{b}
Ramsay MacDonald: 1922, 1936 ^{b}
Charles Roden Buxton: 1922, 1929
Fred Jowett: 1922, 1929
Hastings Lees-Smith: 1922, 1924, 1935
John Edward Sutton: 1922 ^{b}, 1923
Arthur Henderson, Sr.: 1919 ^{b}, 1923 ^{b}, 1924 ^{b}, 1933 ^{b}
Edward Hemmerde: 1912 ^{b}, 1922
Geoffrey Howard: 1911 ^{b}, 1923
Charles Masterman: 1911 ^{b}, 1923
Sir James Millar: 1911 ^{b}, 1922, 1929
Sir Donald Maclean: December 1910, 1929
Edward Anthony Strauss: December 1910, 1927 ^{b}, 1931
Sir Hamar Greenwood: December 1910, 1924
Frederick Guest: December 1910, 1923, 1931
Leif Jones: December 1910, 1923, 1929
William Mitchell-Thomson: December 1910, 1923
Arthur Griffith-Boscawen: December 1910, 1921 ^{b}
J. E. B. Seely: 1910 ^{b}, 1923
Sir Harry Foster: January 1910, 1924
Henry Duke: January 1910, 1911
Winston Churchill: 1908 ^{b}, 1924
Frederick Leverton Harris: 1907 ^{b}, 1914 ^{b}
Thomas Bramsdon: 1906, 1918
Havelock Wilson: 1906, 1918
John Scurrah Randles: 1906 ^{b}, 1912 ^{b}
Bonar Law: 1906 ^{b}, 1911 ^{b}
James Rowlands: 1906, December 1910
Harry Levy-Lawson: 1905 ^{b}, 1910
Walter Runciman: 1902 ^{b}, 1924
Charles Cripps: 1901 ^{b}, 1910
Alfred Billson: 1897 ^{b}, 1906
Sir Francis Evans: 1896 ^{b}, 1901 ^{b}
Lord Henry Cavendish-Bentinck: 1895, 1910
Sir Robert Finlay: 1895, January 1910
Robert Hermon-Hodge: 1895, 1909 ^{b}, 1917 ^{b}
Archibald Grove: 1895, 1906
John Fletcher Moulton: 1894 ^{b}, 1898 ^{b}
Harry Levy-Lawson: 1893 ^{b}, 1905 ^{b}, Jan 1910
Philip Stanhope: 1893 ^{b}, 1904^{b}
Eugene Wason: 1892, 1899 ^{b}
Michael Davitt: 1892, 1893 ^{b}, 1895
William Mather: 1889 ^{b}, 1900 ^{b}
Edmund Leamy: 1888 ^{b}, 1900
Thomas Buchanan: 1888 ^{b}, 1892 ^{b}, 1903 ^{b}
Tim Healy: 1887 ^{b}, 1911 ^{b}
William O'Brien: 1887 ^{b}, 1900, January 1910
William Sproston Caine: 1886 ^{b}, 1892, 1900
James Agg-Gardner: 1885, 1900, 1911 ^{b}
Lord Charles Beresford: 1885, 1898, 1902 ^{b}, 1910
William Grenfell: 1885, 1892 ^{b}, 1900
Sir Henry Havelock-Allan, 1885, 1892
Sir William Ingram: 1885, 1892
Henry Meysey-Thompson: 1885, 1892
James Lowther: 1881 ^{b}, 1888 ^{b}
John Aloysius Blake: 1880, 1886 ^{b}
Sir Thomas Lea: 1880, 1886
Samuel Danks Waddy: 1879 ^{b}, 1882 ^{b}, 1886
Jacob Bright:1876 ^{b}, 1886
John Philip Nolan: 1874 ^{b}, 1900
Sir George Elliot: 1874 ^{b}, 1881 ^{b}, 1886
Arthur Hayter: 1873 ^{b}, 1893 ^{b}, 1900
Sir Julian Goldsmid: 1870 ^{b}, 1885
Thomas Salt: 1869 ^{b}, 1881 ^{b}, 1886
Lord Claud Hamilton: 1869 ^{b}, 1880 ^{b}, January 1910
Sir Wilfrid Lawson: 1868, 1886, 1903 ^{b}
Edward Brydges Williams: 1868, 1880
Ralph Bernal Osborne: 1866, 1870
William Henry Leatham: 1865, 1880
Arthur Otway: 1865, 1878 ^{b}
Edward Watkin: 1864, 1874
Sir John Ramsden: 1859 ^{b}, 1868, 1880
Sir James Fergusson: 1859, 1885
Abel Smith: 1859, 1866 ^{b}
Joseph Hardcastle: 1857, 1880
Thomas Collins: 1857. 1868, 1881 ^{b}
Sir John Salusbury-Trelawny: 1857, 1868
Sir William Fraser: 1857, 1863 ^{b}, 1874 ^{b}
George Peacocke: 1854 ^{b}, 1859, 1874
Lord Montagu Graham: 1852, 1858 ^{b}
James Patrick Mahon: 1847, 1879 ^{b}, 1887 ^{b}
William Ewart Gladstone: 1847, 1865 ^{b}
Sir Harry Verney: 1847, 1857, 1880
Viscount Melgund: 1847, 1857
Thomas Alcock: 1839, 1847
Fitzroy Kelly: 1838 ^{b}, 1843 ^{b}, 1852
Frederick Tollemache: 1837, 1857, 1868
Robert Aglionby Slaney: 1837, 1847, 1857
Anthony Lefroy: 1833, 1842, 1858
Daniel O'Connell: 1832, 1837
James Barlow-Hoy: 1832, 1835
William Lascelles: 1831, 1837, 1842 ^{b}
Sir William Miles: 1830, 1834 ^{b}
Philip John Miles: 1829 ^{b}, 1835
Sir John Beckett: 1826, 1835
John Nicholas Fazakerley: 1826, 1830 ^{b}
John Ashley Warre: 1820, 1831, 1857
Lord John Russell: 1818, 1826 ^{b}, 1835 ^{b}
William Vesey-FitzGerald: 1813 ^{b}, 1829 ^{b}, 1830 ^{b}, 1831
Frederick Trench: 1812 ^{b}, 1819 ^{b}, 1835
Lord Palmerston: 1811 ^{b}, 1831 ^{b}, 1835 ^{b}
Thomas Creevey: 1807, 1820, 1831
Sir Manasseh Masseh Lopes: 1807, 1812, 1820

Notes:

^{b} indicates a by-election

=== Longest delay before making a comeback ===
In absolute terms two 17th-century members of the English Parliament had 35-year intervals outside the House of Commons:

Edward Mainwaring, 35 years and 269 days from serving as MP for Newcastle-under-Lyme in the parliament that closed on 12 August 1625, to returning for the same seat at start of the Cavalier Parliament on 8 May 1661,
Sir William Killigrew who was out of the Commons 35 years and 30 days from the close of the 1628 parliament on 10 March 1629 when he served as MP for Penryn, Cornwall, until returning as MP for Richmond, Yorkshire on 9 April 1664

Note that intervals of more than a decade between service in the Commons were more commonplace in the 17th than in later centuries due to factors such as:

-years when no parliaments were held, such as Charles I's rule without parliament covering 1630–39,
-Royalist MPs expelled during the English Civil Wars sitting again after the restoration of Charles II (1660),
-the Cavalier Parliament of 1661–79 which met without general elections in meantime.
-former Civil War and Commonwealth era Roundhead MPs returning to the Commons in the 1670s and 1680s under the Whig Party.

Since the establishment of regular parliamentary government at the end of the 17th century and the creation of the United Kingdom Parliament in 1801, possibly the longest gap between sitting was faced by Henry Drummond (1786–1860), of nearly 35 years between the dissolution of his first parliament on 29 September 1812 and returning to his next at the general election held in July–August 1847.

Others who served in the United Kingdom Parliament:

John Angerstein, 33 years (1802–1835)
Walter Hungerford, 32 years (1701–1734)
Henry Bulwer, 31 years (1837–1868)
William Allen, 31 years (1900–1931)
John Buller, 29 years (1796–1826)
Sir Thomas Miller, 28 years (1778–1806)
Sir William Scott, 28 years (1830–1859)
William John Evelyn, 28 years (1857–1885)
Sir Alfred Hopkinson, 28 years (1898–1926)
Samuel Trehawke Kekewich, 27 years (1830–1858)
Sir Edward East, 26 years (1796–1833)
Love Parry-Jones, 26 years (1808–1835)
Lord Edward Thynne, 26 years (1832–1859)
Octavius Coope, 26 years (1848–1874)
James Patrick Mahon, 26 years (second comeback) (1852–1879)
Robert Ferguson, 24 years (1807–1831)
Richard Spooner, 24 years (1820–1844)
Charles Tottenham (1807–1886), 24 years (1831–1856)
Philip Pleydell-Bouverie, 24 years (1832–1857)
Henry Luttrell, 2nd Earl of Carhampton, 23 years (1794–1817)
William Peachy, 23 years (1802–1826)
Henry Tufton, 23 years (1802–1826)
William Ormsby-Gore, 23 years (1807–1830)
Edward Southwell Ruthven, 23 years (1807–1830)
John Arthur Wynne, 23 years (1832–1856)
John Ashley Warre, 23 years (1834–1857)
Sir John Chetwode, 22 years (1818–1841)
James Wentworth Buller, 22 years (1834–1857)
Robert Carden, 21 years (1859–1880)
Lord Claud Hamilton, 21 years (1888–1910)
Francis Leigh, 20 years (1801–1821)
John Cressett-Pelham, 20 years (1802–1822)
Walter Boyd, 20 years (1802–1823)
Duncombe Pleydell-Bouverie, 20 years (1807–1828)
Lord William Cholmondeley, 20 years (1832–1852)
Sir John Shelley, 20 years (1832–1852)
Mathew Wilson, 20 years (1853–1874)
Sackville Stopford-Sackville, 20 years (1880–1900)
Moss Turner-Samuels, 20 years (1924–1945)
John Frederick Cheetham, 19 years (1885–1905)
Felix Cobbold, 19 years (1886–1906)
Ernest Bennett, 19 years (1910–1929)
Sir Thomas Acland, 18 years (1868–1885)
Edward Brocklehurst Fielden, 18 years (1906–1924)
Fenner Brockway, 18 years (1931–1950)
Richard Watson, 17 years (1835–1852)
Sir James Fergusson, 17 years (1868–1885)
John Henry Maden, 17 years (1900–1917)
Paul Tyler, 17 years (1974–1992)
James Patrick Mahon, 16 years (first comeback) (1830–1847)
Hugh Lucas-Tooth, 16 years (1929–1945)
Ian Horobin, 16 years (1935–1951)

The longest interval between parliamentary service for women MPs was 13 years in the case of Jennie Lee, Leah Manning and Lucy Noel-Buxton, Baroness Noel-Buxton who lost their first seats at the general election of October 1931 then gained their second at that of July 1945.

== MPs who resigned without completing at least one full parliament (or five years' service) ==
Nigel Farage, 2026 (resigned to recontest his seat, due to an ongoing Parliamentary Standards Investigation) (Note: won the by election and returned as an MP)
Josh Simons, 2026 (resigned to give a chance for Andy Burnham to return to Parliament)
Stephen Gethins, 2026 (resigned after being elected as a Member of the Scottish Parliament) (Note: Had previously served as an MP 2015–2019)
Scott Benton, 2024 (after suspension for a serious breach of lobbying rules)
Imran Ahmad Khan, 2022 (after conviction for sexual assault)
Tracy Brabin, 2021 (resigned after being elected Mayor of West Yorkshire)
Barry McElduff, 2018 (published a video which was seen to be a mockery of the Kingsmill massacre)
Mark Reckless, 2014 (to re-contest, after defecting to UKIP)
Louise Mensch, 2012 (to spend more time with her family)
Jim Nicholson, 1985 (to re-contest but was defeated)
Frank Cousins, 1966 (disagreed with the Prime Minister over introducing a statutory incomes policy)
Malcolm St. Clair, 1963 (honoured a pledge to stand down)
Sidney Schofield, 1953
John Belcher, 1949 (scandal)
Tom Williamson, 1948
Noel Mason-Macfarlane, 1946 (ill health)
John Boyd Orr, 1946 (to become Director-General of the Food and Agriculture Organization)
Clarice Shaw, 1946 (terminally ill)

== MPs who were recalled before completing at least their first term (or five years' service) ==
Since the Recall of MPs Act 2015 was enacted:

Chris Davies, 2019 (elected in 2015)
Fiona Onasanya, 2019 (elected in 2017)

== MPs who represented multiple parties ==
It is relatively common for MPs to cross the floor and join another party, sometimes with a period as an independent. MPs representing three distinct parties in the House of Commons are much less common.

- Richard Acland – Liberals (1935 to 1942), Common Wealth Party (1942 to 1945), Labour (1947 to 1955)
- Heidi Allen – Conservatives (2015 to February 2019), Change UK (February to June 2019), Liberal Democrats (October to December 2019)^{Ind}
- Carlyon Bellairs – Liberals (1906), Liberal Unionists (1906 to 1910), Conservatives (1915 to 1931)
- Luciana Berger – Labour (2010 to February 2019), Change UK (February to June 2019), Liberal Democrats (September to December 2019)^{Ind}
- John Cartwright – Labour (1974 to 1981), Social Democrats (1981 to 1988), continuing Social Democrats (1988 to 1990)^{SDP}
- Jesse Collings – Liberals (1885 to 1886), Liberal Unionists (1886 to 1912), Conservatives (1912 to 1918)
- Robert Finlay – Liberals (1885 to 1886), Liberal Unionists (1886 to 1892, 1895 to 1906, 1910 to 1912), Scottish Unionists (1912 to 1916)
- George Galloway – Labour (1987 to 2003), Respect (2004 to 2010; 2012 to 2015), Workers (February to May 2024)
- John Horam – Labour (1970 to 1981), Social Democrats (1981 to 1983), Conservatives (1992 to 2010)
- Frank Markham – Labour (1929 to 1931), National Labour (1931; 1935 to 1945), Conservatives (1951 to 1964)
- Francis Mildmay – Liberals (1885 to 1886), Liberal Unionists (1886 to 1912), Conservatives (1912 to 1922)
- Oswald Mosley – Conservatives (1918 to 1920), Labour (1924 to 1931), New Party (1931)
- Angela Smith – Labour (2005 to February 2019), Change UK (February to June 2019), Liberal Democrats (September to December 2019)^{Ind}
- David Owen – Labour (1977 to 1981), Social Democrats (1981 to 1988), continuing Social Democrats (1988 to 1990)^{SDP}
- Jim Sillars – Labour (1970 to 1976), Scottish Labour (1976 to 1979), Scottish National Party (1988 to 1992)
- Chuka Umunna – Labour (2010 to February 2019), Change UK (February to June 2019), Liberal Democrats (August to December 2019)
- Sarah Wollaston – Conservatives (2010 to February 2019), Change UK (February to June 2019), Liberal Democrats (August to December 2019)

Ind: Was also a member of The Independents, a grouping of independent MPs that was not registered as a political party

SDP: After the Social Democratic Party merged with the Liberal Party to form the Liberal Democrats, a minority of SDP members formed the continuing SDP.

== Former and future Commonwealth heads of government ==
Several former heads of government have settled in Britain after their service and served in one of the Houses.

Australia:
Sir Robert Torrens, Premier of South Australia (September 1857); MP for Cambridge 1868–74
Sir George Reid, Prime Minister of Australia (1904–05), previously Premier of New South Wales (1894–99); MP for St George, Hanover Square 1916–18
Sir Newton Moore, Premier of Western Australia (1906–10); MP for St George, Hanover Square October–December 1918, Islington North 1918–23, and Richmond upon Thames 1924–32
Stanley Melbourne Bruce, 1st Viscount Bruce of Melbourne, Prime Minister of Australia (1923–29); in House of Lords 1947–67

Canada:
Edward Blake, Premier of Ontario (1872-73); South Longford 1892-1907
Joseph Martin, Premier of British Columbia (February–June 1900); St Pancras East 1910–18
Richard Bedford Bennett, 1st Viscount Bennett, Prime Minister of Canada (1930–35); in House of Lords 1941–47

Northern Ireland:

Several Prime Ministers of Northern Ireland when it had its own parliamentary government between 1921 and 1972 while remaining in the UK came to serve in Westminster as follows:

James Craig, 1st Viscount Craigavon, Prime Minister of Northern Ireland 1921–40, MP for East Down 1906–18 and Mid Down 1918–21; in House of Lords 1927–40.
Basil Brooke, 1st Viscount Brookeborough, Prime Minister of Northern Ireland 1943–63; in House of Lords 1952–73
Terence O'Neill, Baron O'Neill of the Maine, Prime Minister of Northern Ireland 1963–69; in House of Lords 1970–90
James Chichester-Clark, Baron Moyola, Prime Minister of Northern Ireland 1969–71; in House of Lords 1971–2002
Brian Faulkner, Baron Faulkner of Downpatrick, Prime Minister of Northern Ireland 1971–72; in House of Lords 1977

Several United Kingdom MPs have become a head of government in other parts of the Commonwealth:

Australia:
Sir Charles Gavan Duffy, Premier of Victoria (1871–72), had been MP for New Ross in Ireland in 1852–56
Sir Bryan O'Loghlen, Premier of Victoria (1881–83), had been MP for County Clare, Ireland in 1877–79 (but did not sit)

Hong Kong (as crown colony in 1843–1941 and 1945–1981; Dependent Territory in 1981–1997):
John Bowring, Governor of Hong Kong (1854–59), had been MP for Kilmarnock Burghs in 1835–37 and for Bolton in 1841–49.
John Pope Hennessy, Governor of Hong Kong (1877–83), had been MP for King's County in 1859–65.
Chris Patten, Governor of Hong Kong (1992–97), had been MP for Bath in 1979–92 and has sat in the House of Lords since 2005.

Irish Free State (within Commonwealth to 1948 – subsequently seceded as the Republic of Ireland):
W. T. Cosgrave, President of the Executive Council (1922–32), had been MP for Kilkenny City in 1917–18 and for North Kilkenny 1918–22 but he did not sit at Westminster because of the Sinn Féin policy of abstentionism.
Éamon de Valera, President of the Executive Council (1932–37) and Taoiseach (1937–48) while the Irish Free State was within the Commonwealth (later Taoiseach in the Government of Ireland in 1951–54 and 1957–59, and President of Ireland 1959–73). He had been MP for East Clare 1917–22 and for East Mayo 1918–22, but he did not sit at Westminster because of the Sinn Féin policy of abstentionism.

Malta:
Gerald Strickland, 1st Baron Strickland, Prime Minister of Malta (1927–32), had been MP for Lancaster 1924–28; also sat in the House of Lords 1928–40.

Pakistan:
Chaudhry Mohammad Sarwar, Governor of Punjab (2013–15, 2018–22), had been MP for Glasgow Govan 1997–2005 and Glasgow Central 2005–10; also sat in the Senate of Pakistan 2018.

== Women ==
The first woman elected to the House of Commons was Constance Markievicz who was elected on 14 December 1918 to the constituency of Dublin St Patrick's, but she refused to take her seat as she was a member of Sinn Féin.

The first woman to take her seat as an MP was Conservative Nancy Astor, Viscountess Astor, elected 28 November 1919.

The first female MP to become a cabinet minister was Margaret Bondfield who was appointed Minister of Labour in 1929.

The first female prime minister of the United Kingdom was Margaret Thatcher who served as PM from 1979 to 1990 and Leader of the Conservative Party from 1975 to 1990. Margaret Thatcher was also the first woman to hold one of the Great Offices of State.

=== Mother-daughter sets of MPs ===
These are rarer than father-son sets:

- Edith Summerskill, MP for Fulham West 1938–1955 and Warrington 1955–1961, was mother of Shirley Summerskill, MP for Halifax 1964–1983. Their consecutive service in the Commons totalled 43 years and spans 45 years.
- Winnie Ewing, MP for Hamilton 1967–1970 and Moray and Nairn 1974–1979 was mother of Annabelle Ewing, MP for Perth 2001–2005.

=== Sister sets ===
Sylvia Heal (née Sylvia Lloyd Fox), MP for Mid Staffordshire 1990–1992 and Halesowen and Rowley Regis 1997–2010 and Ann Keen (née Ann Lloyd Fox), MP for Brentford and Isleworth 1997–2010. Keen additionally served with her husband, Alan Keen.

There are two sets of sisters since the 2024 general election:

- Angela Eagle, MP for Wallasey since 1992, and Maria Eagle, MP for Liverpool Garston 1997–2010 and Garston and Halewood 2010–2024, and Liverpool Garston since 2024.
- Rachel Reeves, MP for Leeds West 2010–24 and Leeds West and Pudsey since 2024, and Ellie Reeves, MP for Lewisham West and Penge 2017–2024 and Lewisham West and East Dulwich from 2024. Ellie Reeves additionally served with her husband, John Cryer, until 2024.

The first sister set to succeed each other, indirectly, to the same constituency have been Jo Cox and Kim Leadbeater who both represented Batley and Spen respectively in 2015–2016 and from by-election in 2021 until 2024. Leadbeater continued serving since 2024 for its successor constituency Spen Valley.

=== Constituency representation ===
Most women representing:

Halifax (in 1964–83 and since 1987) has, since 2024 – been represented by a fifth woman to sit for the constituency.

Longest period represented by women MPs:

Birmingham Edgbaston has been represented by 4 women MPs in continuous succession since a by-election on 2 July 1953, a period of 70 years, apart from a vacancy interval of 63 days between the death of Dame Edith Pitt on 27 January 1966 and the election of her successor Dame Jill Knight at the general election that year.

== Husband-wife sets of MPs ==
First couples to serve as MPs

- Indirectly successively – John Stewart-Murray, Marquess of Tullibardine was MP for West Perthshire from the December 1910 general election until 1917 when he succeeded his father as Duke of Atholl and moved to the House of Lords. His wife Katharine Stewart-Murray, Duchess of Atholl, was MP for Kinross and West Perthshire from 1923 to 1938.
- Directly successively – Waldorf Astor (later 2nd Viscount Astor), who was MP for Plymouth December 1910 until 1918 and Plymouth Sutton from 1918 – October 1919 (on succession to hereditary peerage), and Nancy Astor, Viscountess Astor, who succeeded him as MP for the latter seat, becoming the first woman to take her seat in the Commons, from by-election in November 1919 until 1945.
- Concurrently – Walter Runciman, MP for Swansea West 1924–1929 and Hilda Runciman, MP for St Ives 1928–1929. She relinquished the latter seat at the 1929 general election, enabling him to hold the seat until 1937. (He was also, previously, MP for Oldham 1899–1900 and Dewsbury 1902–1918.)

First widow elected to succeed deceased husband as MP Margaret Wintringham who became MP for Louth, Lincolnshire in 1921 at by-election following death of her husband Thomas Wintringham, who had only served since June 1920 and had died in August 1921. She lost the seat at the 1924 general election. She was the second woman to take her seat in the Commons.

Longest concurrent Commons service as married couple Nicholas Winterton and Ann Winterton – 27 years, from the latter's election in 1983 for Congleton until both retired at the 2010 general election. The former had commenced serving as MP for Macclesfield from 1971. They are also contenders for the record of couple with highest collective years of service in the Commons, totaling 66 years.

Longest span of couple's service in the Commons

- (Consecutive) – Noel Buxton, MP for Whitby from by-election in May 1905 to 1906, and for Norfolk North 1910 to 1918 and 1922 to 1930 when he was raised to peerage as Baron Noel-Buxton, following which his wife Lucy, Baroness Noel-Buxton served as MP for Norfolk North from 1930 to the 1931 general election, and for Norwich from 1945 to 1950, making a span of nearly 45 years.
- (Concurrent) – Aneurin Bevan was MP for Ebbw Vale from 1929 (until his death in 1960), while his wife Jennie Lee, served from 1945 to 1970 as MP for Cannock, making a span of 41 years and 18 days. The latter had been MP for North Lanarkshire from 1929 to 1931, prior to their marriage in 1934.

Although differing in that the husband's service preceded and outlasted the wife's, the Bevans' span has been surpassed by Sir Peter Bottomley who served in the Commons from 26 June 1975 to the 2024 general election, and his wife Virginia, who sat as MP for South West Surrey from by-election on 4 May 1984 to the 2005 general election – a period of 48 years, 339 days.

Representation of a constituency by a couple The establishment of single-member seats by the 20th century as the norm for parliamentary constituencies means there have been no concurrent representations of a constituency by a couple but successive representations by one spouse after the other has died or relinquished the seat have been relatively commonplace in parliament.

Hemel Hempstead was represented the longest, for nearly 39 years, by John Davidson from a by-election in November 1920 until he was elevated to the House of Lords as Viscount Davidson in 1937, when the seat was represented by his wife Frances Davidson, Viscountess Davidson from the subsequent by-election until her retirement at the October 1959 general election.

Louth, Lincolnshire was represented for the shortest time, a total of 4 years and 3 months, by Thomas Wintringham from June 1920 to his death in August 1921, then by his widow, Margaret, from the by-election in September 1921 to the general election in October 1924.

Couples who served separately as MPs before marriage but not together after

- Campbell Stephen, MP for Glasgow Camlachie 1922–1931 and 1935 to his death in 1947, who married in 1945 Dorothy Jewson, who had been MP for Norwich in 1923–1924.
- Nigel Fisher, MP for Hitchin 1950–1955 and Surbiton 1955–1983, who married in 1956 Patricia Ford who had been MP for North Down 1953–1955.
- Jim Sillars, MP for South Ayrshire 1970–1979 and Glasgow Govan 1988–1992, who married in 1981 Margo MacDonald who had been MP for Glasgow Govan in 1973–1974
- Sir Alan Beith, MP for Berwick-upon-Tweed 1973–2015, who married in 2001 Diana Maddock, who had been MP for Christchurch 1993–1997.

Couples who married serving as MPs

- Andrew MacKay, MP for Birmingham Stechford 1977–1979, East Berkshire 1983–1997 and Bracknell 1997–2010, who married in August 1997, Julie Kirkbride, MP for Bromsgrove 1997–2010, when both had been returned in the general election in May 1997.
- Frank Doran, MP for Aberdeen South 1987–1992, Aberdeen Central 1997–2005, and Aberdeen North 2005–2015, who married in 2010 Dame Joan Ruddock, MP for Lewisham Deptford 1987–2015.
- Duncan Hames, MP for Chippenham 2010–2015, who married in 2011 Jo Swinson, MP for East Dunbartonshire 2005–2015 and 2017–2019.
- Nick Raynsford, MP for Fulham 1983–1987, Greenwich 1992–1997 and Greenwich & Woolwich 1997–2015, who married in 2012 Alison Seabeck, MP for Plymouth Devonport 2005–2010 and Plymouth Moor View 2010–2015.
- Nick Smith, MP for Blaenau Gwent since 2010 who married in 2012 Jenny Chapman, MP for Darlington 2010–2019.
- Mark Lancaster, MP for North East Milton Keynes 2005–2010 and Milton Keynes North 2010–2019, who married in 2014 Caroline Dinenage, MP for Gosport since 2010.
- Jack Lopresti, MP for Filton and Bradley Stoke 2010–2024, who married in 2017 Andrea Jenkyns, MP for Morley and Outwood 2015–2024.
- Philip Davies, MP for Shipley 2005–2024, who married in 2020 Esther McVey, MP for Wirral West 2010–2015 and for Tatton since 2017.
- Jeevun Sandher, MP for Loughborough since 2024, who married in 2025 Louise Sandher-Jones, MP for North East Derbyshire since 2024.

Couples who divorced before one partner became an MP

- Shirley Summerskill, MP for Halifax 1964–1983, who divorced in 1971 from her husband John Ryman, who later became MP for Blyth 1974–1983, and Blyth Valley 1983–1987.
- Ron Davies, MP for Caerphilly 1983–2001, who divorced in 1999 from his wife Christina Rees, who later became MP for Neath 2015–2024.

Couples who divorced when one partner had ceased to be an MP

- John Dunwoody, MP for Falmouth and Camborne 1966–1970, and Gwyneth Dunwoody, MP for Exeter 1966–1970 and Crewe 1974–1983 and Crewe and Nantwich 1983–2008, who divorced in 1975.
- Andrew Griffiths, MP for Burton 2010–2019, and Kate Kniveton, MP for the same seat 2019–2024, whose divorce finalised following her election.
- Charlie Elphicke, MP for Dover 2010–2019, and Natalie Elphicke, MP for same seat 2019–2024, who divorced in 2021.

Couples who divorced while both partners served as MPs

- Gordon Prentice, MP for Pendle 1992–2010 and Bridget Prentice, MP for Lewisham East 1992–2010, who divorced in 2000. They were married to each other when both were returned at the same 1992 general election.
- Jack Lopresti, MP for Filton and Bradley Stoke 2010–2024, and Andrea Jenkyns, MP for Morley and Outwood 2015–2024, who had married while both serving as MPs, whose divorce was announced in April 2024.

Couple serving together since 2024 general election

- Alex Norris, MP for Nottingham South 2017–2024 and Nottingham North and Kimberley since 2024, who is married to Emma Foody, MP for Cramlington and Killingworth since 2024.
- Jeevun Sandher, MP for Loughborough since 2024, who is married to Louise Sandher-Jones, MP for North East Derbyshire since 2024.

Couples with one spouse still serving in the Commons

- Yvette Cooper, MP for Pontefract and Castleford 1997–2010, for Normanton, Pontefract and Castleford 2010–2024, and Pontefract, Castleford and Knottingley since 2024, whose husband Ed Balls was MP for Normanton 2005–2010 and Morley and Outwood 2010–2015
- Caroline Dinenage, MP for Gosport since 2010, whose husband Mark Lancaster was MP for North East Milton Keynes 2005–2010 and Milton Keynes North 2010–2019
- John Cryer, MP for Hornchurch 1997–2005 and Leyton and Wanstead 2010–2024, married since 2012 to Ellie Reeves, MP for Lewisham West and Penge 2017–24 and Lewisham West and East Dulwich since 2024.
- John Mann, MP for Bassetlaw 2001–2019, whose wife Jo White has been MP for the same seat since 2024.
- Nick Smith, MP for Blaenau Gwent since 2010, whose wife Jenny Chapman was MP for Darlington 2010–2019
- Philip Davies, MP for Shipley 2005–2024, married since 2020 to Esther McVey, MP for Wirral West 2010–2015 and for Tatton since 2017.

First UK MP married to a foreign head of government Stephen Kinnock, MP for Aberavon since May 2015, is married to Helle Thorning-Schmidt, member of the Danish Parliament 2005–2016 and Prime Minister of Denmark 2011–2015, resigning shortly after Kinnock's election.

== Mother-in-law and child-in-law sets ==
(Not as commonplace as those of fathers- and children-in-law.)

- Gwendolen Guinness, Countess of Iveagh, MP for Southend 1927–1935, was mother-in-law to two sons-in-law serving as MPs in her lifetime:

- Sir Henry Channon, MP for Southend 1935–1950 and Southend West 1950–1958
- Alan Lennox-Boyd, MP for Mid Bedfordshire 1931–1960

- Edith Summerskill, MP for Fulham West 1938–1955 and Warrington 1955–1961, was mother-in-law (prior to his divorce from her daughter Shirley) to John Ryman, MP for Blyth 1974–1983 and Blyth Valley 1983–1987
- Patricia Ford, MP for North Down 1953–1955, was mother-in-law to Sir Michael Grylls, MP for Chertsey 1970–1974 and North West Surrey 1974–1997
- Winnie Ewing, MP for Hamilton 1967–1970 and Moray and Nairn 1974–1979, was mother-in-law to Margaret Ewing, MP for East Dunbartonshire 1974–1979 and Moray 1987–2001
- Ann Cryer, MP for Keighley 1997–2010, is mother-in-law to Ellie Reeves, MP for Lewisham West and Penge 2017–2024 and Lewisham West and East Dulwich since 2024, who is married to her son John Cryer, a former MP.

== Parents and children sets – unusual records ==
=== Children elected before parents ===
This is not as commonplace as children following parents into the Commons.

- Thomas Davis Lamb, elected in 1802, and father Thomas Phillipps Lamb, elected in 1812.
- Robert Williams (1767–1847), elected in 1802, and father Robert Williams (1735–1814), elected in 1807.
- William Miles, elected in 1818, and father Philip John Miles, elected in 1820.
- Raymond Greene, elected in 1895, and father Sir Edward Greene, Bt, elected in 1900.
- Walter Runciman, elected in 1899, and father Sir Walter Runciman, Bt, elected in 1914.

=== Children serving alongside parents ===
It is rarer for parents and children to serve in the Commons simultaneously than consecutively (frequent cause of latter being death, retirement or promotion to House of Lords of the father). In most cases given below the children entered parliament in latter stages of the parent's service.

- Ann Cryer, MP 1997–2010, and son John Cryer, MP 1997–2005 and 2010–2024.
- Sally Oppenheim-Barnes, MP 1970–87, and son Phillip Oppenheim, MP 1983–97 – first mother and son set to serve concurrently.
- David Mitchell, MP between 1964 and 1997, and son Andrew Mitchell, MP 1987–97 and since 2001.
- Tony Benn, MP 1950–2001, and son Hilary Benn, MP since 1999.
- Thomas Galbraith, MP between 1940 and 1965, and son Tam, MP 1948–82.
- Harold Macmillan, MP 1924–64, and son Maurice Macmillan, MP 1955–84.
- Arthur Greenwood, MP 1922–54, and son Tony Greenwood, MP 1946–70.
- Isaac Foot, MP 1922–35, and son Dingle, MP 1931–45 and 1957–70.
- William Adamson, MP 1910–31, and son William Murdoch Adamson, MP 1922–45.
- Stanley Baldwin, MP 1908–37, and son Oliver, MP 1929–47.
- Sir Francis Acland, MP 1906–39, and son Richard, MP 1935–55.
- Ramsay MacDonald, MP 1906–37 and son Malcolm MacDonald, MP 1929–45.
- Arthur Henderson, MP 1903–35, and sons Arthur, junior, MP 1923–66 and William, MP 1923–31.
- Winston Churchill, MP 1900–64, and son Randolph, MP 1940–45.
- Sir Edward Greene, 1st Baronet, MP 1900–06, and son Sir Raymond Greene, 2nd Baronet, MP 1895–1923.
- John Fitazalan Hope, MP 1900–29, and son Arthur, MP 1924–39.
- Sir Walter Runciman, MP 1914–18, and son Walter, MP 1899–1937.
- Alexander Henderson, MP 1898–1916, and son Harold Henderson, MP 1910–16.
- Wentworth Beaumont, MP 1895–1907, and brother Hubert, MP 1906–10.
- Sir Frederick Cawley, MP 1895–1918, and son Harold Thomas Cawley, MP 1910–15.
- Alfred Hopkinson, MP 1895–98 and 1926–29, and son Austin Hopkinson, MP 1918–29 and 1931–45.
- John Benn, MP 1892–1910, and son William Wedgwood Benn, MP 1906–42. (Latter father of Tony Benn.)
- Thomas Curran, MP 1892–1900, and son Thomas Bartholomew Curran MP 1892–1900.
- David Lloyd George, MP 1890–1945, son Gwilym Lloyd George, MP 1922–57, and daughter Megan Lloyd George, MP 1929–51 and 1957–66. First concurrent father and son and daughter set of MPs when returned at 1929 general election.
- Sir Charles Swann, 1st Baronet, MP 1886–1918, and son Duncan Swann, MP 1906–10.
- Sir John Brunner, 1st Baronet, MP 1885–1910, and son Sir John Brunner, 2nd Baronet, MP 1906–24.
- John Redmond, MP 1881–1918, and son William Redmond, MP 1910–22.
- Justin McCarthy (politician), MP 1879–1900, and son Justin Huntly McCarthy, MP 1884–92.
- Joseph Chamberlain, MP 1876–1914, and son Austen, MP 1892–1937.
- William Vernon Harcourt, MP 1868–1904, and son Lewis, MP 1904–17 (the latter was elected in March 1904, before his father died serving in October same year).
- Samuel Morley, MP 1866–85, and son Arnold, MP 1880–95.
- Duncan McLaren, MP 1865–81, and sons John, MP 1880 and 1881, and Charles, MP 1880-85 and 1892–1910.
- Sir Joseph Whitwell Pease, 1st Baronet, MP 1865–1903, and sons Sir Alfred Edward Pease, 2nd Baronet, MP 1885–1902, and Joseph Albert Pease, MP 1892–1916.
- George Goschen, MP 1863–1900, and his son George Goschen, jnr, MP 1895–1900.
- Sir Bernhard Samuelson, MP 1859–95, and son Henry, MP 1868–85.
- John Hubbard, MP 1859–87, and son Egerton, MP 1874–89.
- Sir Edward Watkin, MP 1857–95 and son Alfred Mellor Watkin, MP 1877–80.
- Abel Smith (1829–1898), MP 1854–98, and son Abel Henry Smith, MP 1892–1910.
- William Philip Price, MP 1852–73, and son William Edwin Price, MP 1868–80.
- Samuel Whitbread, MP 1852–95, and son Samuel Howard Whitbread, MP 1892–1910.
- Michael Thomas Bass, MP 1848–83, and sons Michael, MP 1865–86, and Hamar Alfred Bass, MP 1878–98.
- Lionel de Rothschild, MP 1847–74, and his son Nathan Rothschild, MP 1865–85.
- John Bright, MP 1843–89, and son William, MP 1885–90.
- Walter Long, MP 1835–65 and son Richard Penruddocke Long, MP 1859–68.
- Sir Thomas Dyke Acland, 11th Baronet, MP 1837–86, and sons Thomas, MP 1882–92, and Arthur, MP 1885–99.
- John Bagshaw, MP 1835–59, and son Robert John Bagshaw, MP 1857–59 (both represented same two-member seat of Harwich).
- William Ewart Gladstone, MP 1832–95, and sons William Henry, MP 1865–85, and Herbert, MP 1880–1910.
- Thomas Law Hodges, MP 1830–41 and 1847–52, and son Thomas Twisden Hodges, MP 1835–37 and 1847–52.
- Thomas Langlois Lefroy, MP 1830–41, and son Anthony, MP 1830–70.
- Daniel O'Connell, MP 1828–46, and sons John, MP 1832–57, Maurice, MP 1832–53, and Morgan, MP 1832–40. (Possibly greatest number of sons returned alongside their father in 1832 general election.)
- Sir Gilbert Heathcote, 5th Baronet, MP 1820–56, and son Sir Gilbert Heathcote, 6th Baronet, MP 1852–67.
- Philip John Miles, MP 1820–37, and son William Miles, MP 1818–65.
- Hussey Vivian, MP 1820–41, and son Charles Vivian, MP 1835–42.
- Ralph Bernal, MP 1818–52, and son Ralph Bernal Osborne, MP 1841–74.
- Luke White, MP 1818–24, and son Henry White, MP 1823–61.
- George Tennyson, MP 1818–19, and son Charles Tennyson-d'Eyncourt, MP 1818–52.
- John Maberley, MP 1816–32, and son William Leader Maberley, MP 1819–34.
- Wilbraham Egerton, MP 1812–31, and son William Egerton, MP 1830–58.
- Henry Lowther, MP 1812–67, and son Henry, jnr, MP 1847–72.
- Sir Thomas Frankland Lewis, MP 1812–55, and son George Cornewall Lewis, MP 1847–63.
- Sir George Philips, 1st Baronet, MP 1812–35, and son Sir George Philips, 2nd Baronet, MP 1818–52.
- Sir Robert Peel, 2nd Baronet, MP 1809–50, and son Frederick Peel, MP 1849–65.
- Richard Hart Davis, MP 1807–31, and his son Hart Davis, MP 1812–18.
- Alexander Baring, MP 1806–35, and sons Bingham Baring, MP 1826–48, and Francis Baring, MP 1830–57.
- William Ormsby-Gore, MP 1806–57, and son John, MP 1837–76.
- Sir John Shelley, MP 1806–31, and son John Villiers Shelley, MP 1830–67.
- Henry Grattan, MP 1803–20, and son James, MP 1817–29.
- Robert Haldane Bradshaw, MP 1802–32, and son James, MP 1825–32. (They represented the same, two-member seat, of Brackley.)
- Charles Chaplin the elder, MP 1802–16, and son Charles Chaplin the younger, MP 1809–31
- John Smith, MP 1802–35, and son John Abel Smith, MP 1830–59.
- Charles Grant, MP 1802–18, and son Charles, jnr, MP 1811–35.
- Sir Robert Wigram, 1st Baronet, MP 1802–07, and son Sir Robert Wigram, 2nd Baronet, MP 1806–30.
- Robert Williams (1735–1814), MP 1807–12, and his son Robert Williams (1767–1847), MP 1802–34.
- Henry Bankes, MP 1801–31, and sons William John Bankes, MP 1810–34, and George Bankes, MP 1816–56.
- John Blackburne (1754–1833), MP 1801–31, and son John Ireland Blackburne (1783–1874), MP 1807–47.
- John Calcraft, MP 1801–31, and son John Hales Calcraft, MP 1820–59.
- John Calvert (1726–1804), MP 1801–02, and son John Calvert (died 1844), MP 1801–31.
- Lord George Cavendish, MP 1801–31, and sons William Cavendish, MP 1804–12, George Henry Compton Cavendish, MP 1806–09, Henry Frederick Compton Cavendish, MP 1812–34, and Charles Compton Cavendish, MP 1814–57. (Largest number of sons serving during their father's service in the Commons.)
- Sir Henry Dashwood, 3rd Baronet, MP 1801–20, and son George Dashwood, MP 1814–18.
- Sir William Lemon, 1st Baronet, MP 1801–24, and son Sir Charles Lemon, 2nd Baronet, MP 1807–57.
- John Fownes Luttrell (1752–1816), MP 1801–16, and son John Fownes Luttrell (1787–1857), MP 1812–32. (Both sat together for same two-member seat, Minehead.)
- Andrew Foley, MP 1801–18, and son Thomas, MP 1805–22.
- Sir Gilbert Heathcote, 4th Baronet, MP 1801–41, and son Sir Gilbert Heathcote, 5th Baronet, MP 1820–56.
- Michael Hicks-Beach (1760–1830), MP 1801–18, and son William Hicks-Beach (1783–1856), MP 1812–17.
- Sir Robert Peel, 1st Baronet, MP 1801–20, and sons Sir Robert Peel, 2nd Baronet, MP 1809–50, and William Yates Peel, MP 1817–47.
- Samuel Smith (1754–1834), MP 1801–32, and son Abel Smith (1788–1859), MP 1810–47. (On two occasions they sat together for the same two-member seat, Wendover, in 1812–18 and 1830–32.)
- Sir Matthew White Ridley, MP 1801–12, and son Nicholas Ridley-Colborne, MP 1805–37.
- Thomas Drake Tyrwhitt-Drake, MP 1801–10, and son Thomas Tyrwhitt-Drake, MP 1805–32. (Both sat for same two-member seat, Amersham.)
- John Beresford, MP 1801–05, and son John Claudius Beresford, MP 1801–11.
- Sir Mark Wood, 1st Baronet, MP 1801–18, and son Mark Wood, jnr., MP 1816–18. (They sat together for same two-member seat, Gatton.)

== Brother sets of MPs ==
=== Largest set ===
Six brother sets:

- Francis Seymour-Conway, Viscount Beauchamp (later 2nd Marquess of Hertford) served 1766–1794; Lord George Seymour-Conway 1784–1790 and 1796–1801; Henry-Seymour-Conway (later Lord Henry Seymour) 1766–1784; Lord Robert Seymour 1771–1790 and 1794–1820; Lord William Seymour 1783–1784 and 1785–1796; and Lord Hugh Seymour 1784–1786 and 1788 to his death in 1801. All began serving in the pre-1801 Parliament of Great Britain and their service in the Commons totalled 126 years.
- Henry Paget, Lord Paget (later 1st Marquess of Anglesey) served 1790–1804 and 1806–1810; Arthur Paget 1794–1807; Berkeley Paget 1807–1826; Sir Charles Paget 1804–1826 and 1831–1833 and 1833–1834; Sir Edward Paget, 1796–1806 and 1810–1820; and William Paget 1790 to his death in 1794. Four of the brothers began serving under the pre-1801 Parliament of Great Britain and their service in the Commons totalled 79 years.

=== Longest span of service in the Commons by brothers ===
Probably the longest (though not continuous) all time span of service by brothers in the Commons, in the Parliament of England, was 85 years from 1562, when Sir Henry Knollys was elected MP for Reading, until the death in 1648 of his brother Sir Francis Knollys (above, aged reputedly 97) also representing Reading, although there were intervals of years when parliament did not meet. They were part of another set of six brothers who all sat at various times.

Since regular parliamentary government was established by the start of the UK Parliament, contenders for longest span of continuous service include the four brothers Sir Robert Peel (also twice prime minister), William Yates Peel, Jonathan Peel and Edmund Peel, with a span of 59 years from Robert's by-election return on 15 April 1809 as MP for Cashel, to the retirement of Jonathan at the 1868 general election as MP for Huntingdon. Their collective service totalled 115 years and all four were simultaneously in Parliament when Edmund was sitting in 1831–1832 and 1835–1837 for Newcastle-under-Lyme. Another 59-year service span was enjoyed by two brothers, William Lowther, 2nd Earl of Lonsdale (when Viscount Lowther before entering the House of Lords in 1841) and Henry Cecil Lowther, from the former's election as MP for Cockermouth in 1808 until the death of the latter as MP for Westmorland (which he had represented since 1812) and Father of the House on 4 December 1867.

Thomas Hyde Villiers and his brother Charles Pelham Villiers (above) had a span of nearly 72 years service from the former's first election as MP in 1826 to the latter's death as a serving MP and Father of the House in 1898, but this was broken by an interval when the former was out of parliament in 1831, and the gap between Thomas' death on 3 December 1832 and Charles' first election in 1835. Their consecutive service thus totalled 69 years.

=== Representation of same constituency by brothers ===
Where seats were in the patronage of territorial magnates, it was commonplace into the 19th century for brothers in (usually landowning) families to hold seats successively or (before the advent of single member seats) even concurrently, before the system of choosing candidates by local party associations became organised on a competitive selection basis. Two brothers successively represented North Derbyshire for a total span of nearly 48 years. Lord Cavendish of Keighley was MP from the 1832 general election until succeeding his father and going to the House of Lords as Earl of Burlington in 1834. He was succeeded by Lord George Henry Cavendish from 1834 until the latter's death on 23 September 1880.

The last set of brothers to represent the same constituency were Frederick and Henry Guest, who did so in connection with two successive constituencies:

- East Dorset. Frederick was first elected at the January 1910 general election but was unable to take his seat due to irregularity by an election agent, causing a by-election in June 1910 when he stepped aside in favour of Henry, who held the seat until the December 1910 general election when Henry in turn stepped aside in favour of Frederick who was elected, to hold the seat until the 1922 general election.
- Plymouth Drake, of which Frederick was MP from 1931 to his death in 1937 when Henry succeeded him at the by-election and held the seat until the 1945 general election.

=== Brother sets serving after the 2024 general election ===
Sets with one brother still serving following the election:

David Miliband, MP for South Shields 2001–2013, and Ed Miliband, MP for Doncaster North from 2005.

== Brother-sister sets of MPs ==
- Gwilym Lloyd George (later 1st Viscount Tenby), MP for Pembrokeshire 1922–1924 and 1929–1950 and Newcastle upon Tyne North 1951–1957, and sister Lady Megan Lloyd George, MP for Anglesey 1929–1951 and Carmarthen 1957–1966.
- Victor Cazalet, MP for Chippenham 1924–1943 and his sister Thelma Cazalet-Keir, MP for Islington East 1931–1945.

=== Brother-sister set serving after the 2024 general election ===
- Set with one sibling still serving – Keith Vaz, MP for Leicester East 1987–2019, and sister Valerie Vaz, MP for Walsall South 2010–2024 and Walsall and Bloxwich since 2024.

== Twins ==
James Grenville and Richard Grenville sat together as MPs for Buckingham from 1774 to 1780.

Edward John Stanley, MP for North Cheshire, sat alongside his brother William Owen Stanley, MP for Anglesey, from 1837 to 1841.

Angela Eagle and Maria Eagle, mentioned above, are the only twin sisters to have sat in the Commons together, last elected in 2024.

== First general election victors by religious affiliation ==
When the UK Parliament was established in 1801, non-Anglicans were prevented from taking their seats as MPs under the Test Act 1672. However, Methodists took communion at Anglican churches until 1795, and some continued to do so, and many Presbyterians were prepared to accept Anglican communion, thus ensuring that members of these creeds were represented in the Parliament. Some Unitarians were also elected.

The first Roman Catholic general election victors in the UK Parliament were at the 1830 general election. They included Daniel O'Connell and James Patrick Mahon in County Clare.

The first Quaker general election victor was Joseph Pease at the 1832 general election.

The first Moravian general election victor was Charles Hindley at the 1835 general election.

The first Jewish general election victor was Lionel de Rothschild at the 1847 general election. He was not permitted to take his seat until 1858.

The first Catholic Apostolic general election victor was Henry Drummond also at the 1847 election.

The first Baptist general election victor was George Goodman at the 1852 general election.

The first Congregationalist general election victor was Samuel Morley at the 1865 general election.

The first declared atheist general election victor was Charles Bradlaugh at the 1880 general election. He was not permitted to take the oath until January 1886, although he sat briefly in 1880–81 when permitted to affirm allegiance; a legal action later held that affirmation had no effect.

The first Parsi general election victor was Dadabhai Naoroji at the 1892 general election.

The first Sikh general election victor was Piara Khabra at the 1992 general election.

The first Latter-day Saint general election victor was Terry Rooney at the 1992 general election, after being initially elected for his seat at a by-election in 1990.

The first Muslim general election victor was Mohammad Sarwar at the 1997 general election.

The first Hindu general election victor was Shailesh Vara at the 2005 general election.

The first Buddhist general election victor was Suella Braverman, then known as Suella Fernandes, at the 2015 general election.

== Physical attributes ==
=== Heaviest ===
The heaviest MP of all time is believed to be Sir Cyril Smith, MP for Rochdale between 1972 and 1992, who weighed 189.6 kg (nearly 30 stone) at his peak in 1976.

=== Tallest ===
The tallest MP of all time is believed to be Daniel Kawczynski, MP for Shrewsbury and Atcham between 2005 and 2024, at 6 feet 8 1/2 inches (2.04 m) in 2007, later stated to be 6 feet 9 inches (2.06 m) in 2014. Before Kawczynski's election the record was held by Louis Gluckstein, MP for Nottingham East between 1931 and 1945, who measured 6 feet 8 inches (2.02 m).

Among pre-20th-century MPs, Sir John Cheyne (c. 1442–1499), known among contemporaries as the "Vigorous Knight" and MP for Wiltshire between 1471 and 1481, has been estimated to have been 6 feet 8 inches (2.03 m) tall, based on analysis of his femur (measuring 21 inches (53 cm)) found in his tomb.

The tallest female MP of all time is believed to be Antoinette Sandbach at 6 feet 4 inches (1.93 m) in 2011, when she was a Senedd Cymru – Welsh Parliament (formerly National Assembly for Wales) member, later stated to be 6 feet 5 inches (1.96 m) in 2019. She served in the House of Commons as MP for Eddisbury in 2015–2019.

=== Shortest ===
Not counting MPs who served as minors, adult contenders for this record in modern times include Sarah Teather, MP for Brent East 2003–2010 and Brent Central 2010–2015, who in 2014 was held to be the shortest MP then sitting, at 4 feet 10 inches (1.47 m) and is now regarded as the shortest woman member in British parliamentary history.

=== Physically disabled MPs ===
The following were all known to be disabled when serving as MPs:

- Sir Francis Bryan, MP for Buckinghamshire in 1529, 1539, 1542 and 1545, who lost an eye in a tournament in 1526.
- William Page, MP for Bridport in 1559, Oxford 1562–1567, and Saltash 1571–1581, who had a hand cut off in lieu of execution for distributing a political pamphlet in 1579.
- John Stubbs or Stubbe, MP for Great Yarmouth 1588–1589, who also had right hand cut off in lieu of execution as Page was for publication of the same pamphlet in 1579.
- Sir Edward Sackville, MP for Sussex 1621–22, who lost a finger in a duel in 1613.
- Sir Thomas Hutchinson, MP for Nottinghamshire 1626 and 1640–1643, who lost two or three fingers when attacked by his guardian in 1613.
- Hugh Bethell, MP for East Riding of Yorkshire 1654–1656 and Hedon 1660–1679, who lost an eye at the Battle of Marston Moor in 1644.
- John Hewson, MP for Guildford 1656–1658, who lost an eye in action in Ireland in 1650.
- Sir Frescheville Holles, MP for Grimsby 1667–1672, who lost an arm in a sea battle in 1666.
- Thomas Erle, MP for Wareham 1679–1698 and 1701–1718, and Portsmouth 1698–1702 and 1708, who lost his right hand (by some reports) at the Battle of Almanza in 1707.
- Sackville Tufton, MP for Appleby 1681–1689, who lost some use of his right hand after being wounded at the Battle of Schooneveld in 1673.
- Sir James Lowther, MP for Carlisle 1694–1702, Appleby 1723–1727, and Cumberland 1708–1722 and 1727–1755, who had his right leg amputated due to gout in 1750.
- John Richmond Webb, MP for Ludgershall 1695–1698, 1699–1705, 1706–1713 and 1715–1724, and for Newport, Isle of Wight 1713–1715, who was lame after being severely wounded at the Battle of Malplaquet in 1709.
- John Mordaunt, Viscount Mordaunt, MP for Chippenham 1701–1705 and 1705–1708, who lost his left arm at the Battle of Blenheim in 1704.
- George Clarke, MP for Winchelsea 1702–1705, East Looe 1705–1708, Launceston 1711–1713, and Oxford University 1717–1736, who by 1734 lost his left eye and was losing sight in the other.
- Sir John Jennings, MP for Queenborough 1705–1710, Portsmouth 1710–1711 and Rochester 1715–1734, who was becoming increasingly deaf in 1727.
- Galfridus Walpole, MP for Lostwithiel 1715–1721, who lost his right arm by a sea battle in 1711.
- Richard Herbert, MP for Ludlow 1727–1741 and 1743–1754, who lost an eye in a pistol duel in 1746.
- William Windham, MP for Sudbury 1720–1727 and Aldeburgh 1727–1730, who lost a leg at the Battle of Blenheim.
- Charles Stewart, MP for Malmesbury 1723–1727 and Portsmouth 1737–1741, who lost his right hand in a sea battle in 1697.
- William Banks, MP for Grampound 1741–1747, who lost use of legs after an illness in 1745.
- Frederick North, Lord North, MP for Banbury 1754–1790, and Prime Minister 1770–1782, who was increasingly blind from 1786.
- Isaac Barré, MP for Wycombe 1761–1774 and Calne 1774–1790, who became blind in one eye at the Battle of Quebec in 1759 and totally blind in 1784.
- Richard Burton Phillipson, MP for Eye 1762–1768 and 1770–1792, who became deaf by 1784.
- John Sawbridge, MP for Hythe 1768–1774 and City of London 1774–1795, who was paralysed from about 1792.
- Frederick Cornewall, MP for Montgomery Boroughs 1771–1774, who lost his right arm at the Battle of Toulon (1744).
- James Murray, MP for Perthshire 1773–1794, who was permanently disabled in 1761 by a battle wound that left him unable to lie down.
- Hugh Palliser, MP for Scarborough 1774–1779 and Huntingdon 1780–1784, whose left leg was left permanently lame by injury from an accidental shipboard explosion in 1748.
- Pinckney Wilkinson, MP for Old Sarum 1774–1784, who was incapacitated by a stroke from 1782.
- Sir William Middleton, MP for Northumberland 1774–1795, who was lame for life after severe wounding at Battle of Minden in 1759.
- Brook Watson, MP for the City of London 1784–1793, who lost his right leg after a shark attack while swimming at Havana in 1749.
- Francis Mackenzie, MP for Ross-shire 1784–1790 and 1794–1796, who became deaf and almost dumb from scarlet fever at about age of 12.
- Sir John Call, MP for Callington 1784–1801, who became blind in about 1794.
- Sir Lawrence Palk, MP for Ashburton 1787–1796 and Devon 1796–1812, who was severely crippled by gout by 1809.
- Banastre Tarleton, MP for Liverpool 1790–1806 and 1807–1812, who sustained a crippled right hand, losing two fingers, in action during the American War of Independence in 1781.
- John Theophilus Rawdon, MP for Appleby 1791–1796, and Launceston 1796–1802, who lost a leg at the Battle of Brandywine during the American War of Independence in 1777.
- Sir Watkin Williams-Wynn, MP for Beaumaris 1794–1796 and Denbighshire 1796–1840, who became deaf after contracting erysipelas in 1826, and had a large tongue which impeded speech.
- Sir Alexander Hope, MP for Dumfries Burghs 1796–1800 and Linlithgowshire 1800–1834, who lost an arm and was left permanently lame after being wounded in the Flanders Campaign in 1795.
- Sir Edward Paget, MP for Caernarvon Boroughs 1796-1806 and Milborne Port 1810–1820, who lost his right arm in battle during the Peninsular War.
- Sir Robert Abercromby, MP for Clackmannanshire 1798–1802, who became increasingly blind in office due to an eye disease contracted in India by 1797.
- John Horne Tooke, MP for Old Sarum 1801–1802, who lost sight of right eye in a boyhood fight and was reportedly "lame" when he took his seat.
- Robert Haldane Bradshaw, MP for Brackley 1802–1832, who lost use of his left limbs after a stroke in 1831.
- Mervyn Archdall, MP for County Fermanagh 1802–1834, who lost his right arm in battle in Egypt in 1801.
- James Paull, MP for Newtown (Isle of Wight) 1805–1806, who was left disabled in his right arm from a duel in 1795.
- Sir William Maxwell, MP for Wigtownshire 1805–1812 and 1822–1830, who lost his left arm at the Battle of Corunna and was badly wounded in the knee in the Walcheren Expedition in 1809.
- James Mingay, MP for Thetford 1806–1807, who lost his right hand in childhood accident at a mill.
- Sir Samuel Hood, MP for Westminster 1806–1807 and Bridport 1807–1812, who lost an arm in action at sea in 1806.
- Thomas Thompson, MP for Rochester 1807–1818, who lost a leg at the Battle of Copenhagen (1801).
- Fulk Greville Howard, MP for Castle Rising 1808–1832, who lost the sight of one eye during the Helder Expedition in 1799.
- Sir William Beresford, MP for County Waterford 1811–1814, who was blinded in one eye by an accident with a musket on military service in 1786.
- Samuel Shepherd, MP for Dorchester 1814–1819, who was increasingly deaf since 1790.
- Coningsby Waldo-Sibthorpe, MP for Lincoln 1814–1822, who was left paralysed in his lower back in carriage accident in 1821.
- Lord Fitzroy Somerset, MP for Truro 1818–1820 and 1826–1829, who lost his right arm at the Battle of Waterloo.
- Thomas Henry Hastings Davies, MP for Worcester 1818–1834 and 1837–1841, who became increasingly paralysed since a carriage accident while contesting the 1835 general election.
- John Mytton, MP for Shrewsbury 1819–1820, who had incipient deafness which affected his only appearance in a debate.
- Sir Henry Hardinge, MP for Durham 1820–1830, St Germans 1830–1831, Newport (Cornwall) 1831–1832, and Launceston 1832–1844, who lost his left hand at the Battle of Ligny in 1815.
- Lord John Hay, MP for Haddingtonshire 1826–1831 and Windsor 1847–1850, who lost his left arm in a sea battle in 1807.
- Lord William Lennox, MP for King's Lynn 1831–1834, who lost the sight of one eye in a horse riding accident in 1815.
- William Ewart Gladstone, MP for Newark 1832–1845, Oxford University 1847–1865, South Lancashire 1865–1868, Greenwich 1868–1880, and Midlothian 1880–1895, four times prime minister between 1868 and 1894, who lost the forefinger of his left hand in a shotgun accident in 1842.
- Peter Hesketh-Fleetwood, MP for Preston 1832–1837, who lost an eye due to erysipelas infection while in office.
- George Julius Poulett Scrope, MP for Stroud 1833–1867, who became increasingly blind later in office.
- Admiral Sir Charles Napier, MP for Marylebone 1841–1847 and Southwark 1855–1860, who walked with a limp and stoop due to leg and neck wounds received in the Napoleonic Wars.
- Henry Fawcett, MP for Brighton 1865–1874 and Hackney 1874–1884, who was blind since a field shooting accident when he was 25.
- Arthur MacMurrough Kavanagh, MP for County Wexford 1866–1868 and County Carlow 1868–1880, who was born with no arms, and no legs. Or more precisely, no arms below the lower third of his upper arm, nor legs below mid thigh. And in consequence, no hands and no feet.
- Joseph Chamberlain, MP for Birmingham 1876–1885 and Birmingham West 1885–1914, whose sight, speech and use of right hand were impaired by a stroke in 1906.
- Walter Wren, MP for Wallingford in 1880, who was crippled by spinal disease since age of 18.
- Arthur Elliot, MP for Roxburghshire 1880–1892 and City of Durham 1898–1906, who had a leg amputated at age four after a fall.
- Michael Davitt, MP for County Meath in 1882, North Meath in 1892, North East Cork in 1893, and South Mayo 1895–1899, who lost his right arm in an industrial accident at a textile mill in 1857 aged 11.
- Sir William Tindal Robertson, MP for Brighton 1886–1889, who became blind from glaucoma in 1873.
- William Archibald Macdonald, MP for Queen's County Ossory 1886–1892, who was totally blind from age of 13.
- Sir William Hornby, MP for Blackburn 1886–1910, who became deaf in 1908.
- George William Palmer, MP for Reading 1892–1895 and 1898–1904, who became increasingly deaf in office, causing his resignation.
- Sir Winston Churchill, MP for Oldham 1900–1906, Manchester North West 1906–1908, Dundee 1908–1922, Epping 1924–1945 and Woodford 1945–1964, twice prime minister between 1940 and 1955, who became increasingly deaf from 1949 and a wheelchair user after a series of strokes towards the end of his service.
- Joseph Nannetti, MP for Dublin College Green 1900–1915, who was paralysed by illness from 1913.
- Daniel Desmond Sheehan, MP for Mid-Cork 1901–1918, who became deaf due to shellfire and ill-health while serving in World War I by 1917.
- Philip Snowden, MP for Blackburn 1906–1918 and Colne Valley 1922–1931, who was paralysed by cycling accident from waist down in 1891 and walked with aid of sticks.
- Edward Frederick Lindley Wood, MP for Ripon 1910–1925, who was born with a withered left arm and without a left hand.
- Duncan Frederick Campbell, MP for North Ayrshire 1911–1916, who lost his left arm at the First Battle of Ypres in 1914.
- Aubrey Herbert, MP for South Somerset 1911–1918 and Yeovil 1918–1923, who was near blind from youth, becoming totally blind in his last year of life and service.
- Cathal Brugha, MP for County Waterford 1918–1922, who was left with a permanent limp after being wounded in the Easter Rising 1916.
- Dan Irving, MP for Burnley 1918–1924, who had lost a leg in an industrial accident as a railway worker.
- Sir Oswald Mosley, MP for Harrow 1918–1924 and Smethwick 1926–1931, who was left with a permanent limp after fracturing his right leg in a plane crash during World War I.
- Brunel Cohen, MP for Liverpool Fairfield 1918–1931, who lost both legs at the Third Battle of Ypres.
- Frederick Martin, MP for Aberdeen and Kincardine East 1922–1924, who was blinded during military training in 1915.
- Douglas Pielou, MP for Stourbridge 1922–1927, who was severely disabled by wounds at the Battle of Loos in 1915.
- Alfred Barnes, MP for East Ham South 1922-1931 and 1935–1955, who lost his leg in a fairground accident aged eight.
- John Jacob Astor V, MP for Dover 1922–1945, who lost his right leg in battle in World War I in 1918.
- Herbert Morrison, MP for Hackney South 1923–1924, 1929–1931 and 1935–1945, Lewisham East 1945–1950 and Lewisham South 1950–1959, who lost sight of his right eye due to babyhood infection.
- Mabel Philipson, MP for Berwick-upon-Tweed 1923–1929, lost sight in one eye after a car crash near Brooklands racing circuit in 1911 that killed her first husband Thomas Stanley Rhodes.
- Ian Fraser, MP for St. Pancras North 1924–1929, 1931–1937 and for Lonsdale 1940–1958, who was blinded at the Battle of the Somme.
- Robert Bourne, MP for Oxford 1924–1938, who lost sight of one eye in schooldays game of rounders and sustained a crippled hand at Suvla Bay during World War I.
- Harold Macmillan, MP for Stockton-on-Tees 1924–1929 and 1931–1945 and for Bromley 1945–1964, Prime Minister 1957–1963, who was left with a slight limp and weak right hand, affecting handwriting, by a series of wounds in World War I.
- Charles Simmons, MP for Birmingham Erdington 1929–1931, Birmingham West 1945–1950 and Brierley Hill 1950–1959, who lost a lower leg at the Battle of Vimy Ridge in 1917.
- Richard Austen Butler, MP for Saffron Walden 1929–1965, who was left with a poorly functioning right hand after a childhood riding accident.
- Reginald Essenhigh, MP for Newton 1931–1935, who lost a leg in action in World War I in 1917.
- Joseph Leckie, MP for Walsall 1931–1938, who became increasingly deaf in office.
- Duncan Sandys, MP for Norwood 1935-1945 and Streatham 1950–1974, who was left with a permanent limp after foot injuries in a motoring accident in 1941.
- John Dugdale, MP for West Bromwich 1941–1963, who was partly deaf from childhood.
- Violet Bathurst, Lady Apsley, MP for Bristol Central 1943–1945, had a hunting accident in 1930 which left her permanently disabled and unable to walk, needing a wheelchair.
- Cecil Manning, MP for Camberwell North 1944–1950, who lost his right arm serving in World War I.
- Michael Foot, MP for Plymouth Devonport 1945–1955, Ebbw Vale 1960–1983 and Blaenau Gwent 1983–1992, who walked with aid of a stick since car crash injuries in 1963 and was blinded in one eye by an attack of shingles in 1976.
- Hervey Rhodes, MP for Ashton under Lyne 1945–1964, who walked with a limp after severe wounding in World War I.
- Geoffrey Stevens, MP for Portsmouth Langstone 1950–1964, who became increasingly deaf from 1962.
- Iain Macleod, MP for Enfield West 1950–1970, who permanently limped due to a World War II wound in 1940 and later ankylosing spondylitis.
- Richard Frederick Wood, MP for Bridlington 1950–1979, who lost both legs in battle in the Middle East in World War II (son of Edward Frederick Lindley Wood, above).
- William Rees-Davies, MP for Isle of Thanet 1953–1974 and Thanet West 1974–1983, who lost his right arm in action in World War II.
- William Yates, MP for The Wrekin 1955–1966, who lost a leg at the knee in the First Battle of El Alamein.
- Julian Critchley, MP for Rochester and Chatham 1959–1964 and Aldershot 1970–1997 who was severely impaired in mobility since before 1992 because of complications of polio suffered when a young man.
- John Montagu Douglas Scott, Earl of Dalkeith, MP for Edinburgh North 1960–1973, who was left paralysed chest down after a fox hunting accident in 1971.
- Jack Ashley, MP for Stoke-on-Trent South 1966–1992, who became profoundly deaf in 1967 after a routine operation.
- Roland Boyes, MP for Houghton and Washington 1983–1997, who suffered from Alzheimer's disease from 1993.
- Terry Dicks, MP for Hayes and Harlington 1983–1997, who had cerebral palsy.
- Gordon Brown MP for Dunfermline East 1983–2005 and Kirkcaldy and Cowdenbeath 2005–2015, Prime Minister 2007–2010. Blind in left eye since a rugby accident in 1967.
- David Maclean, MP for Penrith and The Border 1983–2010, who has had multiple sclerosis since 1996 (own account).
- Paul Flynn, MP for Newport West 1987–2019, who was diagnosed with lifelong rheumatoid arthritis at age nine and suffered serious hearing loss while employed in a nail factory.
- Emma Nicholson, MP for Devon West and Torridge 1987–1997, who has been deaf since age 16.
- David Blunkett, MP for Sheffield Brightside 1987–2010 and Sheffield Brightside and Hillsborough 2010–2015, who has been blind since birth.
- Anne Begg, MP for Aberdeen South 1997–2015, who has used a wheelchair since 1984 due to a degenerative disease.
- Fiona Mactaggart, MP for Slough 1997–2017, who suffered from multiple sclerosis as early as 2006.
- Nicola Blackwood, MP for Oxford West and Abingdon 2010–2017, who was diagnosed with Ehlers–Danlos syndrome in 2013.
- Robert Halfon, MP for Harlow 2010–2024, who has cerebral palsy.
- Stephen Lloyd, MP for Eastbourne 2010–2015 and 2017–2019, who is deaf in one ear and has partial hearing in another since contracting measles aged six.
- Paul Maynard, MP for Blackpool North and Cleveleys 2010–2024, who has cerebral palsy and a congenital speech defect.
- Alec Shelbrooke, MP for Elmet and Rothwell 2010–2024 and Wetherby and Easingwold since 2024, who is partially deaf.
- Craig Mackinlay, MP for South Thanet 2015–2024, who had his feet and hands amputated in 2023 after contracting sepsis.
- Marsha de Cordova, MP for Battersea since 2017, who is registered blind.
- Jared O'Mara, MP for Sheffield Hallam 2017–2019, who has cerebral palsy.
- Fiona Onasanya, MP for Peterborough 2017–2019, who was diagnosed with multiple sclerosis in 2018.
- Jonathan Gullis, MP for Stoke-on-Trent North 2019–2024, who is deaf in one ear.
- Tom Randall, MP for Gedling 2019–2024, who has had ankylosing spondylitis since age 16.
- Liam Conlon, MP for Beckenham and Penge since 2024, who has been disabled since a major hip fracture at age 13.
- Stephen Darling, MP for Torbay since 2024, who has been registered blind since 1986, having been born with a genetic eye condition.
- Marie Tidball, MP for Penistone and Stocksbridge since 2024, who was born with foreshortened arms and legs and one digit on each hand.

== Members of Parliament notable by the manner of their death ==
=== Died on wartime service in HM Armed Forces ===
==== To 1914 ====
Rank and title	Name	Born	Killed/Died	Where/How	Political party	MP's seat	Other
Sir	Peter de Montfort	1215	1265	Killed at the Battle of Evesham	Baronial Forces	Unknown	1st Speaker of the House of Commons
Sir	Richard de Caverswall	c. 1255	1297	Believed killed at Battle of Falkirk		Staffordshire (1295)	
Sir	Robert de Mauveysin	c. 1295	1346/47	Died during Siege of Calais in the Hundred Years' War		Staffordshire (1336)	
Sir	Robert de Swynnerton	c. 1355	1386	Died during attack on Brest during Hundred Years' War		Staffordshire (1378)	
Sir	Thomas Blenkinsop	c. 1336	By April 1388	Died a war prisoner in Scotland		Cumberland (1383), Westmorland (February 1388-death)	
Sir	Robert Whitney		1402	Killed at Battle of Bryn Glas during Glyndŵr Rising		Herefordshire (1377–80, 1391)	High Sheriff of Herefordshire (1377)
Sir	Kynard de la Bere		1402	Killed at Battle of Bryn Glas		Herefordshire (1384, 1386, 1390, 1399)	High Sheriff of Herefordshire (1387, 1396 and 1401)
Sir	Walter Devereux	c. 1361	1402	Mortally wounded at Battle of Bryn Glas		Herefordshire 1401	High Sheriff of Herefordshire (1401)
Royal Standard Bearer of England Sir	Walter Blount		1403	Killed on royal side at the Battle of Shrewsbury		Derbyshire (1399–1400)	
Sir	Nicholas Burdon		1403	Killed on royal side at Battle of Shrewsbury		Nottinghamshire (1395)	
Sir	John Calveley		1403	Killed on royal side at Battle of Shrewsbury		Rutland (1383, 1390), Leicestershire (1385, 1397)	Sheriff of Rutland (1384 and 1389); Sheriff of Warwickshire and Leicestershire (1389 and 1402)
Sir	John Clifton		1403	Killed on royal side at Battle of Shrewsbury		Nottinghamshire (1402)	Sheriff of Nottinghamshire and Derbyshire, (1402-death)
Sir	Hugh Shirley	c. 1362	1403	Killed on royal side at Battle of Shrewsbury		Leicestershire (1393)	
Sir	Thomas Wensley	c. 1343	1403	Killed on royal side at Battle of Shrewsbury	Lancastrian	Derbyshire (1382, 1384, 1386, 1390, 1394)	
Sir	Hugh Browe	1346	1403	Believed to have died fighting on rebel Henry Percy (Hotspur)'s side at the Battle of Shrewsbury		Rutland (1388 and 1390)	
Sir	Reynold Braybrooke	c. 1356	1405	Died of wound during expedition to Flanders		Kent (1404-death)	
Sir	William Boteler		1415	Died during Siege of Harfleur in Hundred Years' War		Lancashire (1406)	
Sir	Thomas Clinton		1415	Died of disease during Siege of Harfleur		Warwickshire (1397), Kent (1404, 1406 and 1414)	
Sir	Nicholas Longford	before 1373	1415	Killed or died of disease during the Siege of Harfleur		Derbyshire (1404)	Sheriff of Lancashire (1414)
Sir	John Phelip		1415	Died of fever during the Siege of Harfleur		Worcestershire (1413)	English Ambassador to France (1414–death)
	Nicholas Broomford	c. 1362	1415	Died after invaliding home after the Siege of Harfleur		Cornwall (1406), Barnstaple (1411)	Coroner of Cornwall (1411)
Sir	William Brokesby		1416	Believed to have died of effects of service Agincourt–Harfleur campaign		Leicestershire (1404)	Sheriff of Warwickshire and Leicestershire (1404 and 1409)
Sir	Richard Arches		1417	Died on service in Normandy during Hundred Years' War		Buckinghamshire (1402)	
	Ralph Green	c. 1379	1417	Believed to have died on service in Normandy during Hundred Years' War		Northamptonshire (1404, 1410)	Sheriff of Northamptonshire (1404, 1407 and 1414); Sheriff of Wiltshire (1406); son of Sir Henry Green (also executed).
Sir	John Greyndore	c. 1356	1417	Believed to have died at Harfleur during Hundred Years' War		Herefordshire (1401, 1404)	Sheriff of Glamorganshire (1404, 1405 and 1411)
Marshal Sir	James Haryngton		1417	Killed in siege of Caen in Hundred Years' War		Lancashire (1404)	Constable of Liverpool Castle (1404-death) and Ambassador in Scotland (1415)
Sir	Brian Stapleton		1417	Killed in advance on Alençon in Hundred Years' War		Yorkshire (1416)	
Sir	Edmund Thorpe		1418	Died at siege of Louviers in the Hundred Years' War		Norfolk (1397, 1407)	Mayor of Bordeaux (1400–1402)
Sir	Philip Leche		1420	Killed in siege of Melun in Hundred Years War		Derbyshire (April 1414)	
Sir	Robert Plumpton	1383	1421	Believed killed at the Siege of Meaux in Hundred Years' War		Yorkshire (1411 and 1416), Nottinghamshire (1414)	
Sir	Robert Poynings	c. 1419	1461	Killed during Second Battle of St Albans	Yorkist	Sussex (1450, 1451)	
Sir	William Bonville, later 1st Baron Bonville	c. 1392/93	1461	Beheaded after capture in the Second Battle of St Albans	Yorkist	Somerset (1421), Devon (1422, 1425, 1427)	High Sheriff of Devon (1423)
Sir	John Wenlock, later 1st Baron Wenlock		1471	Killed during Battle of Tewkesbury	Lancastrian	Bedfordshire (1433–55)|Speaker of the House of Commons (1459)	
Sir	Gervase Clifton		1471	Beheaded after capture in Battle of Tewkesbury	Lancastrian	Kent (1455)	Treasurer of the Household and Treasurer of Calais (1450–60) and High Sheriff of Kent (1439, 1450 and 1458)
Sir	John Delves	c. 1418	1471	Beheaded after capture in Battle of Tewkesbury	Lancastrian	Staffordshire (1467–68)	Joint Warden of the Mint (1471)
Sir	Thomas Tresham		1471	Beheaded after capture at Battle of Barnet	Lancastrian	Buckinghamshire (1447–49), Huntingdonshire (1449), Northamptonshire (1453–59)	Speaker of the House of Commons (1455)
	Walter Devereux, later 8th Baron Ferrers of Chartley	c. 1431	1485	Killed at the Battle of Bosworth	Yorkist	Herefordshire (1450–55)	
	John Howard, later 1st Duke of Norfolk	c. 1425	1485	Killed at the Battle of Bosworth	Yorkist	Suffolk (1449–67)	Sheriff of Norfolk and Suffolk 1461, Treasurer of the Royal Household (1468–70), Earl Marshal and Lord Admiral of England (1483-death)
Sir	William Catesby	1450	1485	Beheaded after capture at Battle of Bosworth	Yorkist	Northamptonshire (1484-death)	Speaker of the House of Commons and Chancellor of the Exchequer (1483–1484)
Sir	Edward Bayntun	1480	1544	Died of wounds in France during the Italian War of 1542–46		Wiltshire (1529, 1539–42), Wilton (1542-death)	
Sir	Ralph Eure	by 1510	1545	Killed at Battle of Ancrum Moor in War of the Rough Wooing		Scarborough (1542–44)	Warden of the Middle Marches (1542-death)
Vice-Admiral Sir	George Carew	c. 1504	1545	Lost in sinking of the Mary Rose off Spithead during the Italian War		Devon 1529	
Marshal of the Army in France Sir	Ralph Ellerker		1546	Killed in battle at Boulogne during Italian War		Yorkshire (1542–45)	
Vice-Admiral Sir	John Clere	c. 1511	1557	Drowned in sea battle in command of English naval expedition against the Scots in Orkney Islands		Bramber (1542–44, 1545–47), Thetford (1553), Norfolk (1555)	
Sir	William Courtenay	1529/30	1557	Died of disease after Siege of St Quentin, France		Plympton Erle (1555)	
Captain	Francis Somerset	By 1532	1571	Killed in attack on Le Havre		Monmouthshire (1558)	Younger son of Henry Somerset, 2nd Earl of Worcester hence 'The Honourable'
Captain	William Norreys	c. 1545	1579	Died of fever on arrival in Ireland		Berkshire (1576-death)	Younger son of Henry Norris, 1st Baron Norreys hence 'The Honourable' and brother of Sir John Norreys and Sir Henry Norreys
	Henry Knollys	c. 1542	1582	Died of wounds or disease in Netherlands during Eighty Years' War		Reading (1562–72), Oxfordshire (1572-death)	
	William Thomas	1551	1586	Killed at Battle of Zutphen during Eighty Years' War		Caernarvonshire (1572-death)	High Sheriff of Anglesey (1578) and Caernarvonshire (1580)
General Sir	Philip Sidney	1554	1586	Died from wound received at Battle of Zutphen		Shrewsbury (1572–84), Kent (1584–85)	Master-General of the Ordnance (1585-death)
Admiral Sir	Richard Grenville	1542	1591	Died of wounds received in Battle of Flores during Anglo–Spanish War		Cornwall (1585–1586)	
Admiral Sir	John Hawkins	1532	1595	Died of sickness off Puerto Rico during Anglo–Spanish War		Plymouth (1571–84)	Treasurer of the Navy (1578-death)
Vice-Admiral Sir	Francis Drake	c. 1540	1596	Died of dysentery at sea off Panama, on same expedition as Hawkins.		Bossiney (1584–85), Plymouth (1593)	
Colonel Sir	John Wingfield		1596	Killed in attack on Cádiz during Anglo-Spanish War		Lichfield (1593-death)	
Colonel-General Sir	Thomas Baskerville		1597	Died of fever on expedition in Picardy		Carmarthen Boroughs (1593)	
General Sir	John Norreys	c. 1547	1597	Died of wounds received in Ireland		Oxfordshire (1589)	Eldest son of Henry Norris, 1st Baron Norreys hence 'The Honourable' and brother of William Norreys and Sir Henry Norreys
Marshal of the Army in Ireland Sir	Henry Bagenal	c. 1556	1598	Killed at the Battle of the Yellow Ford		Anglesey (1586–88)	
Sergeant-Major-General Sir	Conyers Clifford		1599	Killed in Battle of Curlew Pass		Pembroke (1593–97)	President of Connaught (1597-death)
Captain Sir	Thomas Egerton	1574	1599	Killed in ambush while serving in Ireland		Cheshire (1597)	
Colonel-General Sir	Henry Norreys	c. 1554	1599	Mortally wounded at Finniterstown in Ireland		Berkshire (1589 and 1597–98)	Younger son of Henry Norris, 1st Baron Norreys hence 'The Honourable' and brother of William Norreys and Sir John Norreys
Captain	James Wriothesley, Lord Wriothesley	1605	5 November 1624	Died of fever in Netherlands during Eighty Years' War		Callington (1621–22), Winchester (February 1624-death)	Eldest son of Henry Wriothesley, 3rd Earl of Southampton, hence Lord Wriothesley
Colonel Sir	John Ratcliffe	1582	1627	Killed in France in Siege of Saint-Martin-de-Ré		Tewkesbury (1614), Lancashire (1621–26), Tavistock (1626)	
	Robert Pooley	c. 1600	1627	Killed in France in Siege of Saint-Martin-de-Ré		Queenborough (1624–25 and 1626-death)	
Lieutenant-Colonel Sir	Edward Vere	1581	1629	Died of wounds at siege of 's-Hertogenbosch during Thirty Years' War		Newcastle-under-Lyme (February–April 1624)	
Sir	Arthur Tyringham	c. 1585	1642	Died of disease or wounds received commanding defence of Lisburn during Irish rebellion		Brackley (1614)	Custos Rotulorum of Anglesey (1640-death)
Royal Standard-Bearer of England Sir	Edmund Verney	1590/1596	1642	Killed during the Battle of Edgehill during the Civil War	Royalist	Buckingham (1624–25), New Romney (1625–26), Aylesbury (1629), Wycombe (1640-death)	Knight Marshal (1623–1642)
Lieutenant Colonel	William Herbert		1642	Killed during the Battle of Edgehill	Royalist	Cardiff (1640-death)	
Colonel Sir	Oliver St John, later 5th Baron St John of Bletso	1603	1642	Died of wounds after Battle of Edgehill	Civil War Roundhead	Bedfordshire (1624–29)	
Sir	Richard Buller	1578	1642	Died after retreat from Launceston in Civil War	Roundhead	St Germans (1621), Saltash (1625–29), Cornwall (1640), Fowey (1640-death)	High Sheriff of Cornwall (1637)
Colonel	Thomas Smith or Smyth	1609	1642	Died while serving with Royalist army at Cardiff	Royalist	Bridgwater (1628–29 and 1640 – August 1642), Somerset (1640)	
Colonel	Ralph Sneyd	1564	1643	Killed by gunfire on the Isle of Man during Civil War	Royalist	Stafford (1640–1642)	
General	Robert Greville, later 2nd Baron Brooke	1607	1643	Killed by a sniper in Lichfield during the Civil War	Roundhead	Warwick (1628)	
General	Spencer Compton, Lord Compton, later 2nd Earl of Northampton	1601	1643	Killed during Battle of Hopton Heath during the Civil War	Royalist	Ludlow (1621–29)	Lord Lieutenant of Warwickshire and Lord Lieutenant of Gloucestershire (1630-death)
Lieutenant-General Sir	Robert Pierrepont, later 1st Earl of Kingston-upon-Hull	1584	1643	Captured by Roundheads at Gainsborough, then killed by friendly fire when boat transporting him to Hull was fired on by Royalist artillery	Civil War Royalist	Nottinghamshire (1601–04)	High Sheriff of Nottinghamshire (1613)
Colonel	Lucius Cary, 2nd Viscount Falkland	1610	1643	Killed during the First Battle of Newbury during the Civil War along with The Earl of Carnarvon and the Earl of Sunderland	Parliamentarian, then Royalist from 1642	Newport (Isle of Wight) (1640–42)	Scottish peer so could sit in English Commons; Secretary of State (1642-death)
Colonel	William Brooke, later 12th Baron Cobham	1601	1643	Died of wounds received on Roundhead side at First Battle of Newbury		Rochester (1628–29)	
Colonel	Ferdinando Stanhope		1643	Killed at Bridgeford during the Civil War	Royalist	Tamworth (1640-death)	
Colonel Sir	Bevil Grenville	1596	1643	Killed during the Battle of Lansdowne during the Civil War	Royalist	Cornwall (1621–25 and 1640–42), Launceston (1625–29 and 1640)	
Colonel	Nicholas Kendall	c. 1577	1643	Killed at siege of Bristol during the Civil War.	Royalist	Lostwithiel (1625 and 1640)	
Colonel Sir	Nicholas Slanning	1606	1643	Killed at siege of Bristol	Royalist	Plympton Erle (1640), Penryn (1640–42)	
	John Trevanion	1613	1643	Killed at siege of Bristol	Royalist	Grampound (1640), Lostwithiel (1640-death)	
Trooper	Sidney Godolphin	1610	1643	Killed at Chagford during Civil War	Royalist	Helston (1628–29 and 1640-death)	
Colonel	John Hampden	c. 1595	1643	Killed at Battle of Chalgrove Field during Civil War	Roundhead	Grampound (1621), Wendover (1624–29), Buckinghamshire (1640-death)	
Colonel	Henry Bulstrode	1578	1643	Died serving in Roundhead army in Civil War		Helston (1614), Buckinghamshire (1625)	
Colonel	Arthur Goodwin	c. 1593/94	1643	Died of 'camp fever' after campaign in Buckinghamshire in Civil War	Roundhead	High Wycombe (1621–24), Aylesbury (1626), Buckinghamshire (1640-death)	
Colonel Sir	William Pennyman, 1st Baronet	1607	1643	Died of plague in Oxford during Civil War	Royalist	Richmond, Yorkshire (1640–42)	
Sir	Edward Noel, later 2nd Viscount Campden	1582	1643	Died in the Royalist garrison at Oxford during Civil War	Civil War Royalist	Rutland (1601)	
Colonel	John Fenwick		1644	Killed during Battle of Marston Moor during the Civil War	Royalist	Morpeth (1640–1644)	
Colonel Sir	John Mill	c. 1608	1644	Died after capture by Roundhead forces at Christchurch, Hampshire	Civil War Royalist	Lymington (1625)	
Sir	William Savile, 3rd Baronet	1612	1644	Killed in action near York during Civil War	Royalist	Yorkshire 1640, Old Sarum 1641–42	
	Michael Warton	1593	1645	Killed during Great Siege of Scarborough Castle during the Civil War	Royalist	Beverley (1640–1644)	
Colonel Sir	Richard Hutton	1594	1645	Killed as Royalist in battle at Sherburn-in-Elmet during the Civil War		Knaresborough (1626–29)	
Sir	Richard Cave	c. 1593	1645	Killed at Battle of Naseby during Civil War	Royalist	Lichfield (1641–42)	
Colonel Sir	Thomas Aston, 1st Baronet	1600	1645	Struck on head attempting to escape Roundhead captivity in Stafford and died of fever it and other wounds caused in the Civil War	Royalist	Cheshire (1640)	High Sheriff of Cheshire (1635)
Colonel	Thomas Lowther	1602	1645	Died of tuberculosis at Newark during the Civil War	Civil War Royalist	Berwick-upon-Tweed (1626–28), Appleby (1628–29)	
	Thomas Leedes		1645	Killed at Oxford during the Civil War	Royalist	Steyning (1640–1642)	
Sir	William Croft	c. 1595	1645	Killed after attempted raid on Stokesay Castle in Civil War	Civil War Royalist	Launceston (1614), Malmesbury (1626–29)	
Colonel Sir	Marmaduke Roydon	1583	1646	Died of illness in command in Berkshire during the Civil War	Civil War Royalist	Aldeburgh (1628–29)	
Colonel	John Ramsden	1594	1646	Killed at the Siege of Newark in the Civil War	Royalist	Pontefract (1628, 1640)	
Colonel	Nicholas Kemeys, later Sir Nicholas, 1st Baronet	by 1593	1648	Killed leading defence of Chepstow Castle in Civil War	Civil War Royalist	Monmouthshire (1628–29)	High Sheriff of Monmouthshire (1631) and High Sheriff of Glamorganshire (1638)
Colonel Sir	Francis Thornhagh	1617	1648	Killed near Chorley after Battle of Preston (1648) during the Civil War	Roundhead	East Retford (1646–death)	
Colonel	Thomas Rainsborough	1610	1648	Killed at siege of Pontefract during Civil War	Roundhead	Droitwich (1647-death)	
Colonel	John Moore	1599	1650	Died of fever in Ireland during Irish Confederate Wars	Roundhead	Liverpool (1640-death)	
Lieutenant-General	William Hamilton, Earl of Lanark, later 2nd Duke of Hamilton	1616	1651	Died of wounds at Battle of Worcester	Royalist	Portsmouth, 1640	Scottish Peer so could sit in English House of Commons; Secretary of State, Scotland (1641–49)
General	Henry Ireton	1611	1651	Died of fever after Siege of Limerick	Roundhead	Appleby (1645-death)	Lord Deputy of Ireland (1651-death)
General at Sea	Edward Popham	1610	1651	Died of fever in naval command at Dover during Civil War	Roundhead	Minehead (1645–48)	
Lord	William Widdrington	1610	1651	Killed at the Battle of Wigan Lane	Royalist	Northumberland (1640–1642)	
General at Sea	Robert Blake	1598	1657	Died at sea from wounds received in Anglo-Spanish War en route to Plymouth	Roundhead	Bridgwater (1640, 1645, 1654) Taunton (1656-death)	Lord Warden of the Cinque Ports (1656-death)
Lieutenant-Colonel	Francis White		1657	Lost at sea on Goodwin Sands returning from Flanders	Roundhead	Tewkesbury (1656-death)	
Captain	Charles Berkeley, 1st Viscount Fitzhardinge, later 1st Earl of Falmouth	1630	1665	Killed during the Battle of Lowestoft along with Earl of Marlborough and the Earl of Portland when a chain shot decapitated them	Royalist	New Romney (1661–1664)	Sat in Commons while Irish peer until created Earl of Falmouth; Keeper of the Privy Purse (1662-death)
Captain-Lieutenant	Edward Montagu	c. 1636	1665	Died at Bergen, Norway in Battle of Vågen	Royalist	Sandwich (1661-death)	Eldest son of Edward Montagu, 2nd Baron Montagu of Boughton, hence 'The Honourable'
Vice-Admiral	Edward Montagu, later 1st Earl of Sandwich	1625	1672	Battle of Solebay	Roundhead to 1660, then Royalist	Huntingdonshire (1645–60), Dover (1660)	English Ambassador to Spain (1666), Custos Rotulorum of Huntingdonshire (1660-death) & Master of the Great Wardrobe (1660-death)
Captain Sir	Frescheville Holles	1642	1672	Battle of Solebay	Royalist	Grimsby (1667-death)	
	Matthew Wren	1629	1672	Battle of Solebay	Royalist	Lostwithiel (1661-death)	
Admiral Sir	Edward Spragge	1629	August 1673	Fourth Battle of Texel	Royalist	Dover (February 1673-death)	
Captain	John Trelawny	c. 1646	1680	Killed in Tangier		West Looe (1677-death)	
	Wadham Strangways	1646	1685	Killed by rebel musketeer on duty with West Dorset Militia in Bridport during the Monmouth Rebellion		Bridport (1677–79)	
Lieutenant-Colonel	Charles FitzWilliam	c. 1646	September 1689	Died during Williamite War in Ireland	Whig	Peterborough (1685–87 and 1689-death)	Younger son of William FitzWilliam, 2nd Baron FitzWilliam, hence 'The Honourable'
Colonel	Philip Babington	c. 1632	1690	Died of fever during Williamite War in Ireland		Berwick-upon-Tweed (1689)	
Colonel Sir	Francis Edwardes, 1st Baronet	1643	1690	Died during Williamite War in Ireland		Shrewsbury (1685–87 and 1689-death)	
Lieutenant-General	Percy Kirke	c. 1646	1691	Died at Brussels on service during War of the Grand Alliance	Tory	West Looe (1689–90)	Keeper of Whitehall Palace (1687-death)
Lieutenant-General	Thomas Tollemache	c. 1651	1694	Died at Plymouth of wounds received in attack on Brest during War of the Grand Alliance		Malmesbury (1689–90), Chippenham (1692-death)	Governor of Portsmouth (1690-death)
Captain	William Bokenham		1702	Died at sea after Battle of Vigo Bay during War of the Spanish Succession	Whig	Rochester (1701–02)	
	Lewis Oglethorpe	1681	1704	Died of wounds received at Battle of Schellenberg		Haslemere (1702-death)	
Colonel	Thomas Stringer	1660	1706	Died in Flanders during War of the Spanish Succession		Clitheroe (1698-death)	
Lieutenant-Colonel	George Dashwood	1669	1706	Died aboard ship at Torbay embarking with his regiment to Spain during War of the Spanish Succession	Tory	Sudbury (1703–05)	
Admiral of the Fleet Sir	Cloudesley Shovell	1650	1707	Died at sea in Scilly naval disaster of 1707 returning from the Mediterranean during War of the Spanish Succession (drowned or murdered by civilian robber onshore)		Rochester (1695–1701 and 1705-death)	
Brigadier-General	William Nassau de Zuylestein, Viscount Tunbridge, later 2nd Earl of Rochford	1682	1710	Killed at Battle of Almenara in War of the Spanish Succession	Whig	Steyning (1708–09)	Also Member of the Parliament of Ireland
Colonel Lord	James Cavendish	1701	November 1741	Died in West Indies during War of Jenkins's Ear.	Whig	Malton (May 1741-death)	Younger son of William Cavendish, 2nd Duke of Devonshire, hence 'Lord'.
Captain Lord	Augustus FitzRoy	1716	1741	Died in West Indies during War of Jenkins's Ear	Whig	Thetford (1739-death)	Younger son of Charles FitzRoy, 2nd Duke of Grafton, hence 'Lord'.
Lieutenant-Colonel	Charles Campbell	c. 1695	1741	Died in Jamaica during War of Jenkins's Ear.		Argyllshire (1736-death)	
Captain	James Cornewall	1698	1744	Killed at Battle of Toulon during War of the Austrian Succession		Weobley (1732–34, 1737–41)	
Lieutenant-General Sir	James Campbell	c. 1680	1745	Died of wounds received at Battle of Fontenoy in War of the Austrian Succession	Whig	Ayrshire (1727–41)	
Colonel	Robert Douglas	c. 1703	1745	Killed at Battle of Fontenoy	Whig	Orkney and Shetland (1730-death)	Younger son of George Douglas, 13th Earl of Morton, hence 'The Honourable'
Captain	Charles Ross	1721	1745	Killed at Battle of Fontenoy		Ross-shire (1741-death)	
Colonel Sir	Robert Munro, 6th Baronet	1684	1746	Killed at Battle of Falkirk during Jacobite Rebellion	Whig	Tain Burghs (1710–41)	
Captain Lord	George Graham	1715	1747	Died of illness contracted at sea during War of the Austrian Succession	Whig	Stirlingshire (1741-death)	Younger son of James Graham, 1st Duke of Montrose, hence 'Lord'
Captain	Thomas Grenville	1719	1747	Mortally wounded in First Battle of Cape Finisterre (1747) during War of the Austrian Succession	Whig	Bridport (1746-death)	
Brigadier-General	William Douglas	1688	1747	Died in Flanders during War of the Austrian Succession	Whig	Kinross-shire (1715–22)	
Brigadier-General	George Howe, 3rd Viscount Howe	1725	1758	Battle of Carillon	Tory	Nottingham (1747–death)	Irish peer so could sit in the Commons
Major	John Rutherfurd	1712	1758	Killed serving with Royal Americans at Battle of Carillon		Roxburghshire (1734–42)	
Colonel	Sir John Armytage, 2nd Baronet	1732	1758	Battle of Saint Cast	Tory	York (1754–death)	
Lieutenant-Colonel	Henry Pleydell Dawnay, 3rd Viscount Downe	1727	1760	Wounds received at Battle of Campen	Tory	Yorkshire (1750–death)	Irish peer so could sit in the Commons
Rear-Admiral	Charles Holmes	1711	1761	Died in command at Jamaica during Seven Years' War		Newport (Isle of Wight) (1758-death)	
Captain Sir	William Peere Williams, 2nd Baronet	c. 1730	1761	Killed in Capture of Belle Île		New Shoreham (1758-death)	
Lieutenant-Colonel	Henry Townshend	1736	1762	Killed at Battle of Wilhelmsthal		Eye (1758–60, 1760-death)	
Captain Lord	William Campbell	1731	1778	Died from effects of wound received in attack on Fort Moultrie in American War of Independence		Argyllshire (1764–66)	Governor of Nova Scotia (1766–73) & Governor of South Carolina (1775); Younger son of John Campbell, 4th Duke of Argyll, hence 'Lord'
Lieutenant-Colonel	John Maitland	1732	1779	Died of fever after Siege of Savannah in American War of Independence		Haddington Burghs (1774-death)	Younger son of Charles Maitland, 6th Earl of Lauderdale, hence 'The Honourable'
Colonel	James Dundas	1721	1780	Died of fever en route to Jamaica		Linlithgowshire (1770–74)	
Lieutenant-Colonel Sir	Alexander Leith, 1st Baronet	1741	3 October 1780	Died in Jamaica commanding expedition against Nicaragua		Tregony (1774 – June 1780)	
Major-General	William Phillips	1731	1781	Died of disease in Virginia during American War of Independence		Boroughbridge (1775–80)	
Rear-Admiral Lord	Robert Manners	1758	1782	Battle of the Saintes	Tory	Cambridgeshire (1780-death)	Younger son of John Manners, Marquess of Granby, hence 'Lord'
Lieutenant-General Sir	Eyre Coote	1726	1783	Died of illness at Madras in command during Second Anglo-Mysore War		Leicester (1768–74), Poole (1774–80)	Commander-in-Chief, India (1779-death)
Captain	Richard Barry, 7th Earl of Barrymore	1769	1793	Accidentally killed with own gun when escorting French prisoners of war to Dover during French Revolutionary Wars		Heytesbury (1791-death)	Irish peer, so could sit in the Commons.
Major-General	Thomas Dundas	1750	1794	Died of Yellow Fever after capture of Guadeloupe in French Revolutionary Wars		Orkney and Shetland (1771–80)	Lieutenant Governor of Guernsey (1793) & Governor of Guadeloupe (1794-death)
Captain	William Paget	1769	1794	Died at sea of reopened wound during French Revolutionary Wars	Whig	Anglesey (1790-death)	Younger son of Henry Paget, 1st Earl of Uxbridge, hence 'The Honourable'
Brigadier-General	Stephens Howe	1758	1796	Died of Yellow Fever in Jamaica in French Revolutionary Wars		Great Yarmouth (1795-death)	
Major	Alexander Telfer Smollett	c. 1764	1799	Killed at Battle of Alkmaar in French Revolutionary Wars		Dunbartonshire (1797-death)	
Lieutenant-General Sir	Ralph Abercromby	1734	1801	Died of wounds after Battle of Alexandria in French Revolutionary Wars		Clackmannanshire left Commons 1786	Lord Lieutenant of Clackmannanshire (1797-death)
Vice-Admiral Lord	Hugh Seymour	1759	1801	Died of yellow fever off Jamaica during French Revolutionary Wars.		Newport (Isle of Wight) (1784–86), Tregony (1788–90), Wendover (1790–96), Portsmouth (1796-death)	Commander-in-Chief, Jamaica Station (1800-death); Younger son of Francis Seymour-Conway, 1st Marquess of Hertford, hence 'Lord'
Rear-Admiral	John Willett Payne	1752	1803	Died in Greenwich naval hospital of illness sustained at sea during French Revolutionary Wars		Huntingdon (1787–96)	
Captain	William Proby, Lord Proby	1779	1804	Died of yellow fever at Suriname during Napoleonic Wars	Whig	Buckingham (1802-death)	Eldest son of John Proby, 1st Earl of Carysfort hence Lord Proby.
Rear-Admiral Sir	Thomas Troubridge	c. 1758	1807	Lost in sinking of HMS Blenheim in cyclone off Madagascar during Napoleonic War		Great Yarmouth left Commons 1806	Commander-in-Chief, East Indies Station (1805-death)
Lieutenant-Colonel	Robert Honyman	c. 1781	1808	Died of Yellow Fever in Jamaica during Napoleonic War		Orkney and Shetland (1806–07)	
Major-General	John Randoll Mackenzie	c. 1763	1809	Killed at Battle of Talavera during the Peninsular War		Tain Burghs (1806–08), Sutherland (1808-death)	
Lieutenant-General	Alexander Mackenzie-Fraser	1758	1809	Died in London of fever contracted in Walcheren Campaign		Cromartyshire (1802–06), Ross-shire (1806-death)	
Lieutenant-General Sir	John Moore	1761	1809	Fatally wounded at the Battle of Corunna during the Peninsular War	Tory	Lanark Burghs (1784–1790)	
Lieutenant-Colonel	Michael Symes	1761	1809	Died on homeward voyage after Battle of Corunna		Carlow (1806), Heytesbury (1807)	
Major	George Henry Compton Cavendish	1784	1809	Lost in sinking of transport ship in storm off Cornwall on return from Corunna	Whig	Aylesbury (1806-death)	
Major-General	Robert Craufurd	1764	1812	Mortally wounded at the Siege of Ciudad Rodrigo and died four days later	Tory	East Retford (1802–1806)	
Major	Edward Charles Cocks	1786	1812	Killed at Siege of Burgos in Peninsular War		Reigate (1806-death)	
Lieutenant-Colonel	Cecil Bisshopp	1783	1813	Died of wounds received in Raid on Black Rock during Anglo-American War		Newport (Isle of Wight) (1811–12)	
Vice-Admiral Sir	Samuel Hood, 1st Baronet	1762	1814	Died at Madras in command of East Indies Station during Napoleonic War		Westminster (1806–07), Bridport (1807–12)	Commander-in-Chief, East Indies Station (1811-death)
Captain Sir	Peter Parker, 2nd Baronet	1785	1814	Killed at Battle of Caulk's Field during Anglo-American War	Tory	Wexford (1810–11)	
Lieutenant-Colonel Sir	Henry Sullivan, 2nd Baronet	1785	1814	Killed at Battle of Toulouse	Tory	Lincoln (1812-death)	
Lieutenant-General Sir	Thomas Picton	1758	1815	Killed at the Battle of Waterloo		Pembroke (1813-death)	Governor of Trinidad (1797–1802) & Governor of Tobago (1803)
Major-General Sir	William Ponsonby	1772	1815	Killed at the Battle of Waterloo	Tory	Londonderry (1812–death)	Younger son of William Ponsonby, 1st Baron Ponsonby, hence 'The Honourable'
Admiral of the Fleet Sir	Henry Byam Martin	1773	1854	Died in command at Portsmouth during Crimean War		Plymouth (1818–32)	Comptroller of the Navy (1816–31)
Colonel	Robert Edward Boyle	1809	1854	Died at Varna of sickness during Crimean War	Liberal	Frome (1847-death)	Younger son of Edmund Boyle, 8th Earl of Cork, hence 'The Honourable'
Lieutenant-Colonel	Lauderdale Maule	1807	1854	Died at Constantinople of cholera contracted in Crimean War		Forfarshire (1852-death)	Surveyor-General of the Ordnance (1853-death)
Lieutenant-Colonel	Edward William Pakenham	1819	1854	Killed Battle of Inkerman in Crimean War	Conservative	Antrim (1852-death)	
Field-Marshal Lord	FitzRoy Somerset, later 1st Baron Raglan	1788	1855	Died of dysentery during the Crimean War	Tory	Truro left Commons 1829	Master-General of the Ordnance (1852-death); Younger son of Henry Somerset, 5th Duke of Beaufort, hence 'Lord'
Major-General	James Bucknall Bucknall Estcourt	1803	1855	Died of cholera in the Crimea		Devizes (1848–52)	
Major-General	George Anson	1797	1857	Died of cholera during Siege of Delhi	Conservative	Great Yarmouth (1818–35), Stoke-on-Trent (1836–37), Staffordshire South (left Commons 1853)	Commander-in-Chief, India (1856-death); Younger son of Thomas Anson, 1st Viscount Anson, hence 'The Honourable'
Lieutenant-General Sir	Henry Havelock-Allan, 1st Baronet	1830	1897	Killed at Khyber Pass, Afghanistan	Liberal Unionist	Sunderland (1874–81), South East Durham (1885–92 and 1895–death)	

==== First World War ====
Rank and title	Name	Born	Killed/Died	Where/How	Political Party	MP's Seat	Other
Lieutenant-Colonel	Charles Duncome, Visount Hemsley, later 2nd Earl of Feversham	1879	1916	Killed during the Battle of Flers–Courcelette	Conservative	Thirsk and Malton (1906–1915)	
Lieutenant-Colonel	Guy Victor Baring	1873	1916	Killed during the Battle of the Somme	Conservative	Winchester	Younger son of Alexander Baring, 4th Baron Ashburton so styled 'The Honourable'
Lieutenant-Colonel Lord	Ninian Crichton-Stuart	1883	1915	Killed while leading the 6th Welsh in a night attack on the Hohenzollern Redoubt, near La Bassée	Liberal Unionist Party	Cardiff	Second son of John Crichton-Stuart, 3rd Marquess of Bute so styled 'Lord'
Lieutenant-Colonel	Percy Clive	1873	1918	Killed in action when attached to the 1/5th Lancashire Fusiliers, 5 April 1918 at Bucquoy	Liberal Unionist Party	Ross	DSO
Lieutenant-Colonel	Duncan Frederick Campbell	1876	1916	Wounded by a mine on the Western Front and died of his wounds at Southwold	Unionist	North Ayrshire	DSO
Major	Charles Henry Lyell	1875	1918	Died of pneumonia while serving as Assistant Military Attaché to the US	Liberal	East Dorset (1904–10), Edinburgh South (1910–17)	The only son and heir of Leonard Lyell, 1st Baron Lyell so styled 'The Honourable'
Major Lord	Alexander Thynne	1873	1918	Killed in action in France	Conservative	Bath	DSO; younger son of John Thynne, 4th Marquess of Bath so styled 'Lord'
Major	Valentine Fleming	1882	1917	Killed by German bombing in Gillemont Farm area, Picardy, France	Conservative	Henley	DSO
Major	Philip Glazebrook	1880	1918	Killed in action on 7 March 1918 at Bireh, near Jerusalem	Conservative	Manchester South	DSO
Major	Francis Bennett-Goldney	1865	1918	Died in US hospital in Brest after car accident in France	Independent Unionist	Canterbury	
Captain	Willie Redmond	1861	1917	Died from wounds at the Battle of Messines	Irish Parliamentary Party	Clare East	
Captain	John Joseph Esmonde	1862	1915	Died of pneumonia and heart failure consequent on the strain of overwork	Irish Parliamentary Party	North Tipperary	
Captain	Thomas Agar-Robartes	1880	1915	Wounded in the Battle of Loos on 28 September and killed by a sniper	Liberal	St Austell Division	Eldest son and heir of Thomas Agar-Robartes, 6th Viscount Clifden so styled 'The Honourable'
Captain	Harold Thomas Cawley	1878	1915	Killed in the Battle of Gallipoli	Liberal	Heywood	The second son of Frederick Cawley, 1st Baron Cawley and brother of Oswald Cawley, below.
Captain	Oswald Cawley	1882	1918	Killed in action near Merville	Liberal	Prestwich	The fourth and youngest son of Frederick Cawley, 1st Baron Cawley so styled 'The Honourable'
Captain	Arthur O'Neill	1876	1914	Killed in action at Klein Zillebeke ridge	Ulster Unionist Party	Mid Antrim	Second but eldest surviving son and heir of Edward O'Neill, 2nd Baron O'Neill so styled 'The Honourable'
Captain	Neil James Archibald Primrose	1882	1917	Killed in Gezer during the Sinai and Palestine Campaign while leading his squadron against Turkish positions on the Abu Shusheh ridge during the Third Battle of Gaza	Liberal	Wisbech	PC MC; second son of Archibald Primrose, 5th Earl of Rosebery so styled 'The Honourable' however was created a Privy Counsellor so styled
Captain	Michael Hugh Hicks-Beach, Viscount Quenington	1877	1916	Died as a result of wounds received at Katia, Egypt	Conservative	Tewkesbury	Eldest son of Michael Hicks-Beach, 1st Earl St Aldwyn so held the courtesy title of Viscount Quenington which was a subsidiary title held by his father
Lieutenant	Francis Walter Stafford McLaren	1886	1917	Died following a flying accident during training at RAF Montrose	Liberal	Spalding	Younger son of Charles McLaren, 1st Baron Aberconway so styled 'The Honourable'
Lieutenant	Charles Thomas Mills	1887	1915	Killed in action 6 October 1915 at Hulluch	Conservative	Uxbridge Division	Eldest son and heir of Charles William Mills, 2nd Baron Hillingdon so styled 'The Honourable'
Lieutenant	William Walrond	1876	1915	Died from wounds	Conservative	Tiverton	Eldest Son and heir of William Walrond, 1st Baron Waleran so styled 'The Honourable'
Lieutenant	Thomas Michael Kettle	1880	1916	Killed in action in the Battle of the Somme	Conservative	East Tyrone (1906–10)	
Lieutenant	William Glynne Charles Gladstone	1885	1915	Killed in action in France	Liberal Party	Kilmarnock Burghs	
Lieutenant	Gerald Archibald Arbuthnot	1872	1916	Killed in action in the Battle of the Somme	Conservative	Burnley (1910–1910)	

Died after end of hostilities but listed as First World War casualty by Commonwealth War Graves Commission:

Lieutenant-Colonel Sir Mark Sykes, 6th Baronet (5th Battalion The Yorkshire Regiment); born 1879: died 1919 of Spanish influenza at Paris while attending peace negotiations. MP (Conservative Party) for Kingston upon Hull Central (1911-death).

==== Interwar period ====
Rank in Military	Name	Born	Killed/Died	Where/How	Political Party	MP's Seat	Honours
General	Michael Collins	1890	1922	Killed in ambush of convoy by IRA opponents during Irish Civil War	Sinn Féin	Cork South (1918–21) (but did not sit)	Commander-in-Chief, Irish National Army; Chairman of Provisional Government (January 1922-death) and Minister of Finance (1919-death) Irish Free State; Teachta Dála 1921-death

==== Second World War ====
Rank and title	Name	Born	Killed/Died	Where/How	Political Party	MP's Seat	Honours
Brigadier	John Whiteley	1898	1943	Killed in plane crash in Gibraltar while escorting General Sikorski	Conservative Party	Buckingham	OBE
Colonel	Lionel Beaumont Thomas	1893	1942	Lost at sea during gale after torpedoeing of MV Henry Stanley off the Azores while on mission travel	Conservative	Birmingham King's Norton (1929–35)	MC
Colonel	Victor Cazalet	1896	1943	Killed in plane crash in Gibraltar while escorting General Sikorski	Conservative Party	Chippenham	MC
Colonel	Edward Orlando Kellett	1902/03	1943	Killed in action fighting in North Africa	Conservative Party	Birmingham Aston	DSO
Colonel	John Macnamara	1905	1944	Killed in action fighting in Italy	Conservative Party	Chelmsford	
Colonel	James Baldwin-Webb	1894	1940	Drowned when the SS City of Benares was torpedoed	Conservative Party	The Wrekin	TD
Lieutenant-Colonel	Frank Heilgers	1892	1944	Killed in the Ilford rail crash	Conservative	Bury St Edmunds	
Lieutenant-Colonel	Somerset Arthur Maxwell	1905	1942	Died of wounds received at the Battle of El Alamein	Conservative Party	King's Lynn	Eldest son and heir of Arthur Maxwell, 11th Baron Farnham so styled 'The Honourable'
Commander	Rupert Brabner	1911	1945	Killed in a plane crash near the Azores, while leading a delegation to Canada	Conservative Party	Hythe	DSO DSC; Under-Secretary of State for Air (1944-death)
Lieutenant-Colonel	James Despencer-Robertson	1886	1942	Died suddenly, apparently from overwork as military secretary at Southern Command Headquarters	Conservative Party	Salisbury	OBE
Lieutenant-Colonel	Anthony Muirhead	1890	1939	Committed suicide owing to his fear that a leg-injury might prevent his service in the war	Conservative Party	Wells	MC & Bar TD; Parliamentary Under-Secretary for India and Burma (1938-death)
Major Lord	Apsley	1895	1942	Killed in action in a plane crash in the Middle-East	Conservative Party	Bristol Central	DSO MC TD; eldest son and heir of Seymour Bathurst, 7th Earl Bathurst so styled Lord Apsley
Major	Ronald Cartland	1907	1940	Killed in action during the retreat to Dunkirk	Conservative Party	Birmingham King's Norton	
Captain	Richard Porritt	1910	1940	Killed in action fighting in Belgium	Conservative Party	Heywood and Radcliffe	
Captain	Stuart Russell	1909	1943	Died of fever on active service in Egypt	Conservative Party	Darwen	
Captain	Hubert Duggan	1904	1943	Died of tuberculosis contracted on active service	Conservative Party	Acton	
Captain	George Charles Grey	1918	1944	Killed in action fighting in Normandy	Liberal Party	Berwick-upon-Tweed	
Captain	John Dermot Campbell	1898	1945	Killed in a plane crash in Adriatic during a fact-finding mission in Italy	Ulster Unionist	Antrim	
Lieutenant	Dudley Joel	1904	1941	Killed in action while serving with the Royal Navy	Conservative Party	Dudley	
Flight Lieutenant	John Rathbone	1910	1940	Killed in action on bombing operations over Germany	Conservative Party	Bodmin	
Lieutenant	Peter Eckersley	1904	1940	Accidentally killed in a plane crash near Eastleigh while serving with the Fleet Air Arm	Conservative Party	Manchester Exchange	
Lieutenant	Robert Bernays	1902	1945	Killed in a plane crash in Adriatic during a fact-finding mission in Italy	Liberal Party	Bristol North	
Pilot Officer	Sir Arnold Wilson	1884	1940	Killed in action over northern France while a gunner in RAF Bomber Command	Conservative Party	Hitchin	KCIE CSI CMG DSO
Private	Patrick Munro	1883	1942	Died while taking part in an exercise for the Home Guard at Westminster	Conservative Party	Llandaff and Barry	

Died after end of hostilities but listed as Second World War Casualty by Commonwealth War Graves Commission:

Admiral of the Fleet Sir Roger Keyes, 1st Baronet, later 1st Baron Keyes of Zeebrugge (Royal Navy); born 1872; died 1945 of effects of smoke inhalation sustained in a Japanese aircraft attack when visiting USS Appalachian during a government goodwill tour over 1944–45. MP (Conservative Party) for Portsmouth North (1934–43).

=== Civilian casualty of war ===
Title	Name known by while in Commons	Born	Killed/Died	When/How	Political Party	MP's Seat	Honours
	Matthew Wren	1629	1672	Died at Greenwich from wounds sustained as accompanying Secretary to the Duke of York at Solebay during Third Anglo-Dutch War	Royalist	Mitchell (1661-death)	Secretary to the Duke of York (1667-death)
The Hon	Coulson Wallop	1774	1807	Was in Amiens when war broke out between Britain and France and was interned as an enemy alien. Died in captivity at Verdun, 1807	Whig	Andover (1796–1802)	Younger son of John Wallop, 2nd Earl of Portsmouth, hence 'The Honourable'
	Alfred Baldwin Raper	1889	1941	Drowned when the SS Nerissa was torpedoed in Second World War	Conservative Party	Islington East (1918–22)	
Rt Hon The Earl of Kimberley	John Wodehouse, Lord Wodehouse	1883	1941	Killed in air raid on London, Second World War	Liberal	Mid Norfolk (1906–10)	
Sir	Percy Alden	1865	1944	Killed by German V1 flying bomb attack on London, Second World War	Liberal, after 1918 Labour	Tottenham (1906–18), Tottenham South (1923–24)	

=== Accidental death ===
Title/Rank	Name known by while in Commons	Born	Killed	Political Party	MP's Seat	Offices Held
Sir	Ralph Carminowe	before 1339	1386 (pulled over cliff by hounds when hunting)		Cornwall (1383, 1384, and 1386 but died before taking seat)	High Sheriff of Cornwall 1378
Sir	Thomas Rempston		1406 (drowned in River Thames near London Bridge)		Nottinghamshire (1381–86, 1393–94, 1395–99)	KG PC; Sheriff of Nottinghamshire 1393, Constable of the Tower 1399-death
	Edward Burnebury		1432 (drowned in well)		Launceston (1410–11, 1413, 1414, 1417, 1419, 1422)	Coroner of Cornwall 1423
	Francis Yaxley		1565 (lost in shipwreck in North Sea)		Stamford (1555–58), Saltash (1558)	
Sir	Humphrey Gilbert	c. 1539	1583 (lost in storm on Squirrel returning from Newfoundland)		Plymouth (1571–72), Queenborough (1580-death)	
Sir	John Glanville	1542	1600 (fall from horse while travelling on judicial circuit)		Launceston (1584–85), Tavistock (1586–87), St Germans (1593)	Recorder of Launceston 1590, Justice of the Common Pleas 1598-death.
	Thomas Warre	c. 1576	1617 (drowned in River Severn)		Bridgwater (1614)	Recorder of Bridgwater 1610-death
Sir	Robert Knollys	1547	1619 (after fall)		Reading (1572–86), Breconshire (1589–1611)	KB
	John Whitson	c. 1558	1629 (fall from horse)		Bristol (1605–21 and 1625–28)	High Sheriff of Bristol 1589, Mayor of Bristol 1616
Sir	Miles Hobart	1595	1632 (carriage accident)		Marlow 1628–29	
Sir	Walter Long	c. 1594	1637 (fall from horse when drunk)		Westbury (1621–24 and 1625–28)	
	John Hoskins	1566	1638 (crushed toe which caused gangrene)		Hereford (1604, 1614 and 1628)	Judge of South Wales circuit (1623-death)
Sir	Thomas Lucy	1583/86	8 December 1640 (fall from horse)		Warwickshire (1614–28 and 1640), Warwick (November 1640-death)	
	Lord Fairfax of Cameron (Ferdinando Fairfax to 1640)	1584	1648 (accident unspecified causing gangrene in leg)	Roundhead	Boroughbridge (1614–29, 1640), Yorkshire (1640-death)	Scottish peer so able to sit in English parliament. Governor of Kingston upon Hull (1643–44), Governor of York (1644)
Sir	Oliver Cromwell	c. 1566	1655 (fall into burning hearth)	Royalist	Huntingdonshire (1589–1614, 1624–25)	KB; uncle of Lord Protector Oliver Cromwell.
Sir	Richard Onslow	1601	1664 (allegedly struck by lightning)	Roundhead before 1660, Royalist since	Surrey (1628–29, 1640–48, 1654, 1656–57), Guildford (1660-death)	
	Thomas Robinson	1608	1665 (gored by pet bull)	Royalist	Helston (1660-death)	
Sir	Robert Brooke	1637	1669 (drowned bathing in the Rhone in Avignon, France)		Aldeburgh (1660-death)	
Sir	Henry Marten	1602	1680 (choked on supper in prison)	Roundhead	Berkshire (1640–43, 1646–53)	
	Edmund Waring	c. 1620	1682 (drowned in pond after drinking)	Roundhead	Bridgnorth (1656, 1658)	High Sheriff of Shropshire (1657–59), Governor of Shrewsbury (1659–60)
The Marquess of Worcester	Charles Somerset, styled Lord Herbert of Raglan to 1682, Marquess of Worcester from 1682	1660	1698 (coach accident)		Monmouth (1679–80). Gloucester (1681–85), Monmouthshire (1685–87 and 1689–95), Gloucestershire (1685–89)	Eldest son of Henry Somerset, 3rd Marquess of Worcester, hence titled Lord Herbert of Raglan, until 1682 when his father was created Duke of Beaufort, when the Marquessate of Worcester became courtesy title of eldest son.
	Sir John Aubrey, 2nd Baronet	c. 1650	1700 (fall from horse)		Brackley (1698-death)	High Sheriff of Glamorganshire 1685
	Legh Banks	1666	1703 (drowned crossing River Dee near Chester)		Newton (1695–98)	
	Sir John Cordell, 3rd Baronet	1677	1704 (fall from horse)		Sudbury (1701)	
	Irby Montagu	c. 1656	1704 (fall from horse riding in Enfield Chase)	Whig	Maldon (1695–1701)	
Sir	David Ramsay, 4th Baronet	After 1673	1710 (fall from horse)	Tory	Kincardineshire (1708-death)	Previously MP Parliament of Scotland
	James Herbert		1721 (drowned falling off footbridge into River Thames at Thame)	Tory	Queenborough (1710–13), Amersham (1714–15) and Oxfordshire (1715-death)	
	Sir William Strickland, 3rd Baronet	1665	1724 (fall from hunting horse)	Whig	Malton (1689–98, 1701–08, 1722-death), Yorkshire (1708–10), Old Sarum (1716–22)	
Sir	John Curzon, 3rd Baronet	1672	1727 (fall from horse hunting)	Tory	Derbyshire (1701-death)	
Lord	William Powlett	1666	1729 (fall from horse)	Whig	Winchester (1689–1710 and 1715-death), Lymington (1710–15)	Son of 1st Duke of Bolton, hence 'Lord'; Mayor of Lymington 1701–03, 1724, 1728; Recorder of Grimsby 1699-death
	Exton Sayer	c. 1691	1731 (riding accident)	Whig	Helston (1726–27), Totnes (1727-death)	Judge Advocate, Court of Admiralty (1726-death)
Sir	Mr John Stapylton	c. 1683	1733 (fall from horse)		Boroughbridge (1705–08)	
	Sir William Keyt, 3rd Baronet	1688	1741 (house fire caused by himself when insane)	Tory	Warwick (1722–35)	
Sir	Erasmus Philipps	c. 1700	1743 (drowned in River Avon near Bath)		Haverfordwest (1726-death)	
Sir	Watkin Williams-Wynn, 3rd Baronet	1692	1749 (fall from hunting horse)	Tory	Denbighshire (1716–41 and 1742-death), Montgomeryshire (1741–42)	
	William Howard, Viscount Andover	1714	1756 (fall from carriage)	Anti-Walpole Whig	Castle Rising (1737–47)	Son of Earl of Suffolk, hence Viscount Andover
Sir	John Lade, 1st Baronet	c. 1731	1759 (unsuccessful amputation after fall from hunting horse)		Camelford (1755-death)	
Lieutenant-General	John Stanwix	1690	1766 (lost in sinking of The Eagle crossing Irish Sea)	Whig	Carlisle (1741–42 and 1746–61), Appleby (1761-death)	Lieutenant-Governor Isle of Wight
	Francis Russell, Marquess of Tavistock	1739	1767 (fall from hunting horse)	Whig	Bedfordshire (1761-to death)	Eldest son of John Russell, 4th Duke of Bedford so titled Marquess of Tavistock.
The Lord Sandys	Mr Samuel Sandys	1695	1770 (overturning of post-chaise)	Whig	Worcester (1718–43)	PC; Chancellor of the Exchequer (1742–43), Speaker of the House of Lords (1756)
Lord	William Manners	1697	1772 (fall from horse)	Tory	Leicestershire (1719–34), Newark left Commons 1754	
	Francis Owen	1745	16 November 1774 (collapse of bridge over which he was riding)		Helston (11 October 1774-death)	
	Lauchlan Macleane	c. 1727	1778 (lost as passenger in foundering of HMS Swallow (1769) en route home from India)		Arundel (1768–71)	Governor of St Vincent (1766), Under Secretary of State (1766–68)
The Earl Temple	Richard Grenville, Viscount Cobham	1711	1779 (fall from phaeton)	Whig	Buckingham (1734–41 and 1747–52), Buckinghamshire (1741–47)	KG PC; First Lord of the Admiralty (1756–57), Lord Privy Seal (1757–61), Lord Lieutenant of Buckinghamshire (1758–63)
Captain	Robert Boyle-Walsingham	1736	1780 (lost in sinking of Thunderer (1760) in hurricane off Jamaica)		Knaresborough (1758–60 and 1768-death), Fowey (1761–68)	Son of Earl of Shannon, hence 'Honourable'; FRS
	Henry Howorth	c. 1746	1783 (drowned in boating accident when yachting)		Abingdon (1782–death)	KC; Recorder of Abingdon 1780
	Sir Herbert Mackworth, 1st Baronet	1737	1791 (blood poisoning from pricked finger)		Cardiff (left Commons 1790)	
Colonel	George Onslow	1731	1792 (after carriage accident)	Tory	Guildford (1760–84)	
Lord	Richard Barry, 7th Earl of Barrymore	1769	1793 (accidentally shot himself while escorting French prisoners of war)		Heytesbury (1791–death)	
The Hon	John Stuart, Lord Mount Stuart	1767	1794 (after fall from horse)	Tory	Cardiff (1790-death)	Son of Marquess of Bute, hence Lord Mount Stuart; Lord Lieutenant of Glamorganshire (1793-death)
	Thomas Whitmore	c. 1743	1795 (drowned in well in own garden)	Tory	Bridgnorth (1771-death)	
	Thomas Francis Wenman	1745	1796 (drowned in River Cherwell)		Westbury left Commons 1780	
	James Bruce	1769	1798 (drowned crossing River Don, South Yorkshire on horseback)		Marlborough (1796–97)	Son of 5th Earl of Elgin, hence 'Honourable'
	William Jolliffe	1745	1802 (fall into home cellar)		Petersfield (1768-death)	Lord of Trade 1772–79 and of Admiralty 1783
	John Bagwell	c. 1780	1806 (fall from horse)		Cashel (1801–02)	
Sir	Lionel Copley, 2nd Baronet	1767	1806 (leg fracture from fall from ladder in home)	Whig	Tregony (1796–1802)	
The Marquess of Thomond	Rt Hon The Earl of Inchiquin	1726	1808 (fall from horse)		Richmond, Yorkshire (1784–96), Liskeard (1796–1800)	Irish peer so could sit in English House of Commons. KP PC (Ire)
	Philip Yorke, Viscount Royston	1784	1808 (lost in sinking of Agatha of Lübeck off Memel)		Reigate (1806-death)	Son of Earl of Hardwicke hence Viscount Royston
	George Knapp	1754	1809 (fall from gig)	Whig	Abingdon (1807-death)	Mayor of Abingdon 1792, 1797, 1799, 1807
	William Eden	1782	1810 (found drowned in River Thames, London)		Woodstock (1806-death)	Possibly a suicide.
General	Sir James Murray-Pulteney, 7th Baronet	c. 1755	1811 (mortally wounded by exploding gunpowder flask)	Tory	Weymouth and Melcombe Regis (1790-death)	PC, Secretary at War (1807–09)
	William Cavendish	1783	1812 (fall from curricle)	Whig	Knaresborough (1804), Aylesbury (1804–06), Derby (1806-death)	
	Richard Worsley-Holmes	1792	1814 (drowned in capsize of rowing boat in River Hamble)	Tory	Newport (Isle of Wight) (1812-death)	
	Ayscoghe Boucherett	1755	1815 (carriage accident)		Great Grimsby (1796–1803)	High Sheriff of Lincolnshire 1796
The Earl of Buckinghamshire	Robert Hobart, Baron Hobart	1760	1816 (fall from horse)	Tory	Bramber (1788–90), Lincoln (1790–96)	PC, also MP Parliament of Ireland; Governor of Madras 1793–97; Secretary of State for War and the Colonies 1801–04; Chancellor of the Duchy of Lancaster 1805, 1812; Postmaster General 1806–07; President of the Board of Control 1812-death
Sir	Alexander Macdonald Lockhart, 1st Baronet	c. 1776	1816 (carriage accident)		Berwick-upon-Tweed (1807–12)	
	Richard Meyler	1791	1818 (fall from horse when hunting)		Winchester (1812-death)	
The Duke of Richmond and Gordon	Mr Charles Lennox	1764	1819 (died of rabies from fox bite)	Conservative	Sussex (1790–1806)	PC KG Lord Lieutenant of Ireland (1807–13), Lord Lieutenant of Sussex (1816-death), Governor General of British North America (1818-death)
	William Shipley	1778	1820 (accidentally shot when hunting)	Whig	St Mawes (1807 and 1812–13), Flint Boroughs (1807–12)	
	John Attersoll	c. 1784	1822 (fall from horse)	Whig	Wootton Bassett (1812–13)	
	William Shepherd Kinnersley	1780	1823 (fall from horse)		Newcastle-under-Lyme (1818-death)	Mayor of Newcastle-under-Lyme 1810
Sir	John Stewart	c. 1758	1825 (carriage accident)	Tory	County Tyrone (1802–06 and 1812-death)	PC (Ire), KC (Ireland); Solicitor General of Ireland (1798–1800), Attorney General of Ireland (1800–03); former member of Parliament of Ireland.
	William Huskisson	1770	1830 (killed by train)	Tory	Morpeth (1796–1802), Liskeard (1804–07), Harwich (1807–12), Chichester (1812–23), Liverpool (1823–death)	PC; President of the Board of Trade (1823–1827) Secretary of State for War (1827–1828)
	John Pringle	1796	1831 (thrown out of carriage)		Lanark Burghs (1819–20)	
Admiral	Sir Joseph Yorke	1768	1831 (drowned in yacht capsize)		Reigate (1790–1806 and 1818-death), Saint Germans (1806–10), Sandwich (1812–18)	KCB
Sir	James Mackintosh	1765	1832 (effects of choking on chicken bone)	Whig	Nairn (1813–18), Knaresborough (1818-death)	
Captain	Lewis Fenton	1780	1833 (falling from a window after standing on a chair to get a better view of his turnip patch)	Whig	Huddersfield (1832-death)	
The Earl of Darnley	Edward Bligh, Lord Clifton	1795	1835 (tetanus from axe injury when felling timber)	Whig	Canterbury (1818–30)	Son of 4th Earl of Darnley, hence Lord Clifton; FRS, Lord Lieutenant of County Meath (1831-death)
The Baron Suffield	Edward Harbord	1781	1835 (fall from horse)	Radical	Great Yarmouth (1806–12), Shaftesbury (1820–21)	
	Thomas Courtenay	1782	1841 (drowned while sea bathing)	Tory	Totnes (1811–32)	PC; Vice-President of the Board of Trade 1828–30
The Baron Sydenham	Mr Charles Thomson	1799	1841 (fall from horse)	Whig	Dover (1826–32), Manchester (1832–39)	PC GCB; President of the Board of Trade (1834, 1835–39), Governor General of Canada (1839-death)
	James Barlow-Hoy	c. 1794	1843 (died of tetanus after accidentally shooting himself in Pyrenees)	Conservative	Southampton (1830–31, 1832–33, 1835–37)	
	Paulet St John-Mildmay	1791	1845 (died of tetanus after breaking leg in altercation with horse)	Liberal	Winchester (1818–34 and 1837–41)	
The Earl of Powis	Edward, Viscount Clive	1785	1848 (accidentally shot on hunt)	Conservative	Ludlow left Commons 1839	KG, Lord Lieutenant of Montgomeryshire (1830-death)
Sir	Sir Robert Peel, Baronet	1788	1850 (fall from horse)	Conservative	Cashel (1809–12), Chippenham (1812–17), Oxford University (1817–29), Westbury (1829–30), Tamworth (1830-death)	Prime Minister (1834–35 and 1841–46), Leader of the Conservative Party (1834–46), Chancellor of the Exchequer (1834–35), Home Secretary (1822–27 and 1828–30), Chief Secretary for Ireland (1812–17)
	Thomas Plumer Halsey	1815	1854 (drowned in sinking of Ercolano in Gulf of Genoa)		Hertfordshire (1846-death)	
	Charles Barclay	1780	1855 (fall from horse when hunting)	Tory	Southwark (1815–18), Dundalk (1826–30), West Surrey (1835–37)	
The Earl of Harewood	Henry Lascelles	1797	1857 (hunting accident)	Tory	Northallerton (1826–31)	Lord Lieutenant of Yorkshire West Riding (1846-death)
	James Platt	1824	1857 (accidentally shot when hunting)	Liberal	Oldham (1857-death)	
	Henry Porcher	1795	1857 (fall from horse)	Tory	Clitheroe (1822–26)	Director of the Bank of England 1825–42
The Marquess of Queensberry	Viscount Drumlanrig	1818	1858 (explosion of shotgun)	Conservative	Dumfriesshire left Commons 1857	PC, Lord Lieutenant of Dumfriesshire (1850-death)
	Herbert Ingram	1811	1860 (drowned in sinking of the Lady Elgin after collision in Lake Michigan).	Liberal	Boston (1856-death)	
	Robert Aglionby Slaney	1791	1862 (effects of fall at London International Exhibition)	Liberal, ex Whig	Shrewsbury (1826–35, 1837–41, 1847–51, 1857-death)	High Sheriff of Shropshire 1854
Dr	Thomas Wakley	1795	1862 (after fall while ill with TB)	Liberal	Finsbury (1835–52)	
	George Hay, Earl of Gifford	1822	1862 (injured by falling tree)	Liberal	Totnes (1855-death)	Son of George Hay, 8th Marquess of Tweeddale, hence Earl of Gifford
Sir	Cresswell Cresswell	1794	1863 (fall from horse)	Conservative	Liverpool (1837–42)	PC KC
Lieutenant-General	William Augustus Johnson	1777	1863 (following fall at home)	Conservative	Boston (1821–26), Oldham (1837–47)	High Sheriff of Lincolnshire 1830
Sir	Culling Eardley Smith, later Eardley, 3rd Baronet	1805	1863 (adverse reaction to smallpox vaccination)	Whig	Pontefract (1830–31)	High Sheriff of Lincolnshire 1858
The Marquess Townshend	Mr John Townshend	1798	1863 (fall from horse)	Liberal	Tamworth (1847–55)	
Sir	Mr Alexander Bannerman	1788	1864 (downstairs fall at home when ill)	Whig	Aberdeen (1832–47)	Provost of Aberdeen 1837, Governor of the Bahamas (1854–57), Governor of Newfoundland (1857–64)
	John Cuffe, 3rd Earl of Desart	1818	1865 (fall during attack of paralysis)	Conservative	Ipswich (1842)	Irish peer so could sit in the Commons; Under Secretary for War and the Colonies (1852)
	William Williams	1788	1865 (fall from horse)	Radical	Coventry (1835–47), Lambeth (1850-death)	
Lieutenant-General The Earl of Cardigan	James, Lord Brudenell	1797	1868 (fall from horse)	Conservative	Marlborough (1818–29), Fowey (1830–32), North Northamptonshire left Commons 1837	KCB
The Lord Farnham	Hon Henry Maxwell	1799	1868 (petroleum fire in Abergele rail disaster)	Conservative	County Cavan left Commons 1838	KP
	Sir John Vanden-Bempde-Johnstone, 2nd Baronet	1799	1869 (hunting accident)	Whig to 1836, Conservative 1836–57, Liberal from 1857	Yorkshire (1830–32), Scarborough (1837–41, 1841-death)	
Sir	George Burrard, 4th Baronet	1805	1870 (drowned bathing at Lyme Regis)		Lymington (1828–32)	
Sir	James Colquhoun, 4th Baronet	1804	1873 (drowned in Loch Lomond rowing boat in storm		Dunbartonshire (1837–41)	Lord Lieutenant of Dunbartonshire (1837)
The Lord Marjoribanks	Mr David Robertson	1797	1873 (knocked down by horse drawn cab)	Liberal	Berwickshire (1859–73)	Lord Lieutenant of Berwickshire (1860-death)
	Charles Paget	1799	1873 (drowned by freak wave on Filey beach)	Liberal	Nottingham (1856–65)	
	John Cunliffe Pickersgill-Cunliffe	1819	1873 (struck by train)	Conservative	Bewdley (March–April 1869)	
	John Laird	1805	1874 (fall from horse)	Conservative	Birkenhead (1861-death)	
	Reginald Greville-Nugent	1848	1878 (fall off horse in steeplechase)	Liberal	County Longford (1869–70)	Son of 1st Baron Greville, hence Honourable
Sir	William Hayter, 1st Baronet	1792	1878 (found drowned in lake at home)	Liberal Party	Wells (1837–65)	Judge Advocate General (1847–49), Financial Secretary to the Treasury (1849–50) and Parliamentary Secretary to the Treasury (1853–58)
	Richard Wingfield-Baker	1802	1880 (hunting accident)	Liberal	South Essex (1857–59, 1868–74)	
Sir	William Payne-Gallwey	1807	1881 (fall on turnip while shooting)	Conservative	Thirsk left Commons 1880	
	Gilbert Leigh	1851	1884 (hunting accident)	Liberal	Warwickshire South (1880-death)	Son of 2nd Baron Leigh, hence Honourable
	Guy Cuthbert Dawnay	1848	1889 (killed by buffalo in East Africa)	Conservative	North Riding of Yorkshire (1882–85)	Son of 7th Viscount Downe so styled Honourable.
	John Wentworth-Fitzwilliam	1852	1889 (thrown off horse)	Liberal	Peterborough (1878-death)	
	William Beckett-Denison	1826	1890 (fell under train)	Conservative	East Retford (1876–80), Bassetlaw (1885-death)	
Sir	Edward Grogan, 1st Baronet	1802	1891 (fall from house window)	Irish Conservative Party	Dublin City (1845–65)	
The Viscount Combermere	The Hon Wellington Stapleton-Cotton	1818	1891 (run over by horsedrawn cab)	Conservative	Carrickfergus left Commons 1847	
	Alexander Brogden	1825	1892 (burns from fall into hearth)	Liberal	Wednesbury (1868–85)	
	James Theobald	1829	1894 (fell when boarding train at Romford Station	Conservative	Romford (1886-death)	
	William McCullagh Torrens	1813	1894 (knocked down by hansom cab)	Liberal	Dundalk (1848–52), Finsbury (1865–85)	
	Charles Joseph Fay	1842	1895 (drowned in the River Annalee)	Home Rule League	County Cavan (1874–1885)	
	Henry Villiers-Stuart	1827	1895 (drowned near home when attempting to board a boat)	Liberal	County Waterford (1873–74 and 1880–85)	
	Henry Byron Reed	1855	1896 (killed in overturned pony trap)	Conservative	Bradford East (1886–92 and 1895-death)	
	Garrett Byrne	1829	1897 (run over by Hackney carriage)	Irish Parliamentary Party	County Wexford (1880–83), West Wicklow (1885–92)	
The Lord Herschell	Mr Farrer Herschell	1837	1899 (fall in street in Washington, D.C.)	Liberal	City of Durham (1874–85)	GCB PC QC FRS; Solicitor General for England and Wales (1880–85), Lord Chancellor (1886 and 1892–95)
	John Edmund Severne	1826	1899 (knocked down by van horse)	Conservative	Ludlow (1865–68) and South Shropshire left Commons 1885	
	William Wither Bramston Beach	1826	1901 (run over by cab)	Conservative	North Hampshire (1857–85), Andover (1885-death)	PC
The Marquess of Salisbury	Robert Cecil, Viscount Cranborne	1830	1903 (fall from chair)	Conservative	Stamford (1853–68)	KG GCVO PC FRS; Secretary of State for India (1866–67 & 1874–78), Foreign Secretary (1885–86, 1887–92 & 1895–1900), Prime Minister (1885–86, 1886–92 & 1895–1902)
	Alexander William Black	1859	1906 (Elliot Junction rail accident)	Liberal	Banffshire (1900-death)	
	Sir James Fergusson, 6th Baronet	1832	1907 (killed in earthquake in Jamaica)	Conservative	Ayrshire (1854–57, 1859–68), Manchester North East left Commons 1906	PC GCSI Under-Secretary of State for India (1866–67), Under-Secretary of State for the Home Department (1867–68), Governor of South Australia (1868–73), Governor of New Zealand (1873–74), Governor of Bombay (1880–85), Under-Secretary of State for Foreign Affairs (1886–91), Postmaster-General (1891–92)
	James Tomkinson	1840	1910 (fall from horse in House of Commons Steeplechase)	Liberal	Crewe (1900-death)	PC
	Edward Brodie Hoare	1841	1911 (car crash)	Conservative	Hampstead left Commons 1902	
Sir	Henry Seton-Karr	1853	1914 (drowned in sinking of Empress of Ireland, Canada)	Conservative	St Helens left Commons 1906	CMG
	Percy Illingworth	1869	1915 (food poisoning by bad oyster)	Liberal	Shipley (1906-death)	Parliamentary Secretary to the Treasury and Liberal Chief Whip 1912-death
Lieutenant	The Hon Francis McLaren	1886	1917 (fatally injured in Royal Flying Corps training flight in Scotland)	Liberal	Spalding (1910-death)	
Major	Francis Bennett-Goldney	1865	1918 (car accident in France)	Independent Unionist	Canterbury (1910-death)	Athlone Pursuivant of the Order of St Patrick
Sir	Alfred Bird	1849	1922 (run over by motor car)	Conservative	Wolverhampton West (1910-death)	
	Frank Lawless	1870	1922 (injured in upset pony trap)	Sinn Féin	Dublin North (1918-death but did not sit)	Later Irish Teachta Dála
Baron Cozens-Hardy	William Cozens-Hardy	1869	1924 (killed in car accident in Germany)	Liberal Party	South Norfolk (1918–20)	
	Alexander MacCallum Scott	1874	1928 (killed in aeroplane crash in North America)	Liberal Party in Parliament, Labour later	Glasgow Bridgeton (1910–22)	
Commodore	Douglas King	1877	1930 (drowned in yacht capsize off Cornwall).	Conservative	North Norfolk (1918–22), Paddington South (1922-death)	CB OBE DSO VD PC Financial Secretary to the War Office (1924–28), Secretary for Mines (1928–29)
	John Joseph Clancy	c. 1891/92	1932 (drowned in River Shannon at Limerick)	Sinn Féin	Sligo North (1918–22 but did not sit)	Later Irish Teachta Dála
Viscount	Antony Bulwer-Lytton, Viscount Knebworth	1903	1933 (plane crash while rehearsing for air show while serving in Auxiliary Air Force)	Conservative	Hitchin (1931–death)	
Sir	Sir Frank Meyer	1886	1935 (hunting accident)	Conservative	Great Yarmouth (1924–29)	
Sir	James Blindell	1884	1937 (killed when car overturned)	Holland with Boston (1929-death)	National Liberal	
Sir	Mr Arthur Crosfield	1865	1938 (fell out of railway carriage)	Liberal	Warrington (1906–10)	GBE
	Anthony Crossley	1903	1939 (plane crash)	Conservative	Stretford (1935–death)	
The Lord Tweedsmuir	Mr John Buchan	1875	1940 (head injury in fall during stroke)	Unionist	Combined Scottish Universities left Commons 1935	PC GCMG GCVO CH Governor General of Canada (1935-death)
	Herbert Fisher	1865	1940 (knocked down by lorry)	Liberal	Sheffield Hallam (1916–18), Combined English Universities (1918–26)	OM PC FRS; President of the Board of Education (1916–22)
Lieutenant-General Sir	Aylmer Hunter-Weston	1864	1940 (fall from turret at home)	Unionist	North Ayrshire (1916–18), Bute and Northern Ayrshire (1918–35)	KCB DSO
Lieutenant	Peter Eckersley	1904	1940 (killed in plane crash in England while serving with Fleet Air Arm)	Conservative	Manchester Exchange (1935-death)	
	Luke Thompson	1867	1941 (killed by winch)	Conservative	Sunderland (1931–1935)	
Sir	Harold Hales	1868	1942 (drowned in River Thames)	Conservative	Hanley (1931–35)	
	John Jagger	1872	1942 (motorcycle accident)	Labour	Manchester Clayton (1935–death)	
	Emil Pickering	1882	1942 (thrown from horse)	Conservative	Dewsbury (1918–22)	DSO TD
Brigadier	John Whiteley	1898	1943 (killed in aircraft crash in Gibraltar)	Conservative	Buckingham (1937-death)	OBE
Colonel	Victor Cazalet	1896	1943 (killed in same aircraft crash as Whiteley)	Conservative	Chippenham (1924-death)	MC
Lieut-Col	Frank Heilgers	1892	1944 (train crash)	Conservative	Bury St Edmunds (1931–death)	
	Alfred Dobbs	1882	1945 (car accident – killed day after election)	Labour	Smethwick (1945-death)	Chairman of Labour Party (1943–1943)
Lord	Cecil Manners	1868	1945 (hit by train)	Conservative	Melton left Commons 1906	Son of Duke of Rutland, hence 'Lord'
	Francis Beattie	1885	1945 (Car accident)	Unionist	Glasgow Cathcart (1942–death)	
	James Walker	1883	1945 (road accident)	Labour	Motherwell (1935–death)	
Sir	William Allen	1866	1947 (Hit by motor van)	Ulster Unionist Party	North Armagh (1917–22), Armagh (1922–death)	KBE DSO
Doctor	Richard Clitherow	1902	1947 (accidental barbiturate overdose)	Labour	Liverpool Edge Hill (1945-death)	
Sir	Stanley Jackson	1870	1947 (effects of road accident)	Conservative	Howdenshire (1915–26)	PC; GCSI GCIE; Financial Secretary to the War Office 1922–23, Governor of Bengal, 1927–32
	Evan Durbin	1906	1948 (drowned)	Labour	Edmonton (1945–death)	Parliamentary Secretary, Ministry of Works, 1947–1948
	Joseph Westwood	1884	1948 (car accident)	Labour	Stirling and Falkirk (1935–death)	Secretary of State for Scotland 1945–1947
Sir	Norman Lamont, 2nd Baronet	1869	1949 (gored by bull kept on Trinidad estate)	Liberal	Buteshire (1905–10)	
Reverend	James Godfrey MacManaway	1898	1951 (fall)	Ulster Unionist	Belfast West (February–October 1950)	MBE
	Vyvyan Adams	1900	1951 (drowned swimming on Cornwall coast)	Conservative	Leeds West left Commons 1945	
	John Emlyn-Jones	1889	1952 (plane crash)	Liberal	Dorset North (1922–24)	
	Thomas Cook	1908	1952 (car crash)	Labour	Dundee (1945–50), Dundee East (1950-death)	
	Hilaire Belloc	1870	1953 (burns after falling into fireplace)	Liberal	Salford South (1910–18)	
Lieutenant-General	Sir Noel Mason-MacFarlane	1889	1953 (effects of fall)	Labour	Paddington North (1945–46)	KCB DSO MC & 2 Bars
Sir	Walter Smiles	1883	1953 (lost in sinking of MV Princess Victoria off Larne Lough in the Great Storm)	Conservative 1931–45, Ulster Unionist from 1945	Blackburn (1931–45), County Down (1945–50), North Down (1950-death)	CIE DSO
	John Peto	1900	1954 (accidentally shot himself)	Conservative	Birmingham King's Norton (1941–45)	
Sir	Mr Leslie Orme Wilson	1876	1955 (hit by truck)	Conservative	Reading (1913–22), Portsmouth South left Commons 1923	GCSI GCMG GCIE PC Parliamentary Secretary Ministry of Shipping (1919–21), Parliamentary Secretary to the Treasury (1921–22, 1922–23), Governor of Bombay (1923–28), Governor of Queensland (1932–46)
Sir	Richard Stokes	1897	1957 (heart attack following car overturn)	Labour	Ipswich (1938-death)	MC and bar; Minister of Materials 1951
	Sidney Dye	1900	1958 (car crash)	Labour	South West Norfolk (1945–51 and 1955-death)	
	Wilfred Fienburgh	1919	1958 (car crash)	Labour	Islington North (1951-death)	MBE
	Richard Fort	1907	1959 (car accident)	Conservative	Clitheroe (1950-death)	
Sir	Peter Macdonald	1895	1961 (following riding accident)	Conservative	Isle of Wight (1924–59)	KBE
	John Henry (Jack) Jones	1894	1962 (road accident)	Labour	Bolton (1945–50), Rotherham (1950-death)	
Lord	Malcolm Douglas-Hamilton	1909	1964 (aircraft crash operating chartered flight in Cameroon)	Unionist	Inverness (1950–54)	Son of 13th Duke of Hamilton, hence 'Lord': OBE DFC
	David Webster	1923	1969 (illness/accident)	Conservative	Weston-super-Mare (1958-death)	
The Baron Reith	Sir John Reith	1889	1971 (following fall)	National Government	Southampton (February–November 1940)	KT GCVO GBE CB TD PC Director-General of the BBC 1927–38, Minister of Information and Minister of Transport 1940, First Commissioner of Works 1940–42
The Lord Grant	Mr William Grant	1909	1972 (road accident)	Conservative	Glasgow Woodside left Commons 1962	PC Solicitor General for Scotland (1955–60), Lord Advocate (1960–62)
Sir	Dingle Foot	1905	1978 (choked on chicken bone in sandwich)	Liberal to 1956, then Labour	Dundee (1931–45), Ipswich (1957–70)	PC QC
	Thomas Henry Swain	1911	1979 (road accident)	Labour	Chesterfield (1959-death)	
	Thomas McMillan	1919	1980 (fall from bus)	Labour	Glasgow Central (1966-death)	
	Keith Wickenden	1932	July 1983 (killed in air crash)	Conservative	Dorking (1979 – June 1983)	
Viscount Boyd of Merton	Alan Lennox-Boyd	1903	1983 (knocked down by car)	Conservative	Mid-Bedfordshire left Commons 1959	PC CH, Minister of Transport 1952–54, Colonial Secretary 1954–59
Lord Maelor	Thomas William Jones	1898	1984 (house fire)	Labour	Meirionnydd left Commons 1966	
Baron Harlech	David Ormsby-Gore	1918	1985 (car crash)	Conservative	Oswestry left Commons 1961	PC KCMG, Parliamentary Under-Secretary of State for Foreign Affairs (1956–57), Minister of State for Foreign Affairs (1957–61), British Ambassador to the United States (1961–65)
	David Penhaligon	1944	1986 (car accident)	Liberal	Truro (1974-death)	President of Liberal Party, 1985-death
	Robert Maxwell	1923	1991 (drowned falling off yacht off Canary Islands)	Labour	Buckingham (1964–70)	MC
	Stephen Milligan	1948	1994 (autoerotic asphyxiation)	Conservative	Eastleigh (1992-death)	
	Bob Cryer	1934	1994 (car accident)	Labour	Bradford South (1987-death)	
	Gordon Matthews	1908	2000 (following fall)	Conservative	Meriden (1959–64)	CBE
	Michael Colvin	1932	2000 (house fire)	Conservative	Bristol North West (1979–83), Romsey and Waterside (1983–97), Romsey (1997-death)	
	Donald Dewar	1937	2000 (following fall)	Labour	Aberdeen South (1966–70), Glasgow Garscadden (1978–97), Glasgow Anniesland (1997-death)	Shadow Secretary of State for Scotland (1983–92), Shadow Secretary of State for Social Security (1992–95), Opposition Chief Whip (1995–97), Secretary of State for Scotland (1997–99), inaugural First Minister of Scotland (1999-death)
Lord Merlyn-Rees	Merlyn Rees	1920	2006 (effects of falls)	Labour	Leeds South (1963–83), Morley & Leeds South left Commons 1992	PC, Secretary of State for Northern Ireland (1974–76), Home Secretary (1976–79), Shadow Home Secretary (1979–80), Shadow Secretary of State for Energy (1980–82)
	Jim Dobbin	1937	2014 (choked through alcohol poisoning after meal)	Labour Co-operative	Heywood and Middleton (1997-death)	
	Brian Sedgemore	1937	2015 (after fall when in hospital)	Labour	Luton West (1974–79), Hackney South and Shoreditch (1983–2005)	

=== Duel ===
Title/Rank	Name known by while in Commons	Born	Killed	Political Party	MP's Seat	Offices Held, Honours
Sir	Sir William Drury	1550	1590		Suffolk (1584)	Governor of Bergen-op-Zoom (1588)
Sir	William Brooke	1565	1597		Kent (1597–death)	
Sir	Sir Matthew Browne	1553	1603		Gatton (1601–death)	
Sir	Sir John Townsend	1564	1603		Orford (1601–death)	
	George Wharton	1583	1609		Westmorland (1601–1604)	
	Peter Legh	c. 1622/23	1642		Newton (1640–death)	
	Charles Price		1645	Royalist	Radnor (1621–1629); Radnorshire (1640–1642)	
Sir	Henry Belasyse	c. 1639	1667	Royalist	Grimsby (1666-death)	KB
	Walter Norbonne	1655	1684		Calne (1679, 1681–1684)	
	Sharington Talbot	1656	1685		Chippenham (March 1685-death)	
Sir	Bourchier Wrey, 4th Baronet	1653	1696		Liskeard (1678–79 and 1689-death), Devon (1685–87)	
Sir	Henry Hobart, 4th Baronet	c. 1657	1698	Whig	King's Lynn (1681), Beeralston (1694–95), Norfolk (1689–90 and 1695–death)	Vice-admiral of Norfolk (1691–after 1696)
Sir	John Hanmer, 3rd Baronet		1701		Flint (1685–1690)	
	Thomas Dodson	c. 1666	1707	Tory	Liskeard (1701-death)	
	Owen Buckingham	1674	1720	Whig	Reading (1708–13, 1716-death)	
Sir	Cholmeley Dering, 4th Baronet	1679	1711	Tory	Kent (1705-death)	
	Charles Aldworth	1677	1714	Tory	New Windsor (1712-death)	
	George Lockhart	1673	1731	Tory	Wigtown Burghs (May–December 1708)	
	John Colclough	1767	1807		County Wexford (1806–07)	
Sir	Alexander Boswell, 1st Baronet	1775	1822	Tory	Plympton Erle (1816–21)	

=== Murdered or assassinated (excluding duels) ===
Title/Rank	Name known by while in Commons	Born	Murdered	Party or political faction	Parliamentary seat	Offices held as MP	Honours	Perpetrator(s)
	Philip de Lutley	c. 1300	1352		Staffordshire (1332)			Outlaw on whom he was serving distraint.
	Hugh Snel	c. 1315	1380		Stafford (1337–38, 1354, 1360, 1362–63, 1365–66, 1368–69, 1371, 1373, 1376–77)	Bailiff of Stafford 1337		William Hewster
Sir	Richard Lyons	1310	1381		Essex (1380)	Sheriff of London 1375, Warden of the Mint	PC	Wat Tyler's rebels
Sir	John Ipstones	c. 1345	1394		Staffordshire (1388, 1394-death)			Roger Swynnerton
	William Soulby		1394		Appleby (1382, 1385, 1388, 1391)			Gang led by Sir Thomas Rokeby
	Thomas Solas		1396		Southwark (1393)			Unknown
Sir	Thomas Colville		1405		Yorkshire (1402)			Murdered at Overton, North Yorkshire by followers of Henry Percy, 1st Earl of Northumberland.
	John Tregoose		1406		Helston (1379), Truro (1383, 1385–86), Bodmin (1395), Liskeard (1397)	Coroner of Cornwall 1400-death		Armed gang led by Ralph Trenewith
	Thomas Moyle		1413		Lostwithiel (1388)			Some Lostwithiel men when at Bodmin
	Robert Crackenthorpe		1438		Westmorland (1413, 1416, 1419, 1427), Appleby (1427)			Rowland Thornburgh and supporters
Sir	William Tresham	1404	1450		Northamptonshire (1423-till death)	Speaker of the House of Commons (1449 to death)		People involved in a property dispute
	Nicholas Radford	c. 1385	1455		Lyme Regis (1421), Devon (1435)	Recorder of Exeter, 1442-death		Armed band led by Sir Thomas Courtenay
Sir	Thomas Thorpe		1461	Lancastrians	Northamptonshire (1449–50), Essex (1453–55)	Speaker of the House of Commons (1453–1454)		Imprisoned at London after the Battle of Northampton (1460); escaped and was then caught by a Yorkist mob in Harringay and hanged by them.
	William Chetwynd	c. 1450	1494		Staffordshire (1491–92)			Twenty men commanded by Sir Humphrey Stanley of Elford
	Robert Pakington	c. 1489	1536		City of London (1533-death)			Unknown (shot)
	William Trewynnard	By 1495	1549		Helston (1542)			Catholic rebels
	Thomas Ardern	By 1516	1551		Sandwich (1547)			Thomas Morsby and 'Black Will of Calais'
	Lewis ap Owen	by 1522	1555		Merioneth (1547–53, 1554-death)	Chamberlain of North Wales, High Sheriff of Merionethshire 1545 and 1554, custos rotulorum of Merioneth (1553-death)		Red Bandits of Mawddwy
	Francis Russell, Baron Russell	c. 1554	1585		Northumberland (1572–84)	Son of Francis Russell, 2nd Earl of Bedford, hence Baron Russell		Unknown (shot)
	Edward Aglionby		1599		Carlisle (1584–85, 1593)	Mayor of Carlisle several times		Several members of rival families
	George Thorpe	1576	1622		Portsmouth (1614)			Powhatan warriors (Indian massacre of 1622)
Lord Brooke	Sir Fulke Greville	1554	1628		Southampton (1581), Warwickshire (1592–1621)	Treasurer of the Navy (1596–1604) Chancellor of the Exchequer (1614–1621)	KB PC	Ralph Heywood
Sir	John Lisle	1610	1664	Roundhead	Winchester (1640, 1659–60), Southampton (1654, 1656)			Sir James Fitz Edmond Cotter
	Thomas Thynne	1648	1682		Wiltshire (1670 to death)			Three men, hired by Count von Königsmark
Sir	William Estcourt, 3rd Baronet	1654	1684		Malmesbury (1679–81)			Henry St John and Edmund Webb
	Henry Goring	1646	1685		New Shoreham (1673–1678); Bramber (1679–1685) Steyning (1685-death)	High Sheriff of Sussex 1681–82		Sir Edward Dering, 3rd Baronet or his son Charles Dering
	Ferdinand Foster	1670	1701	Tory	Northumberland (January 1701-till death)			John Fenwick
	John Stewart		1726	Whig	Kirkcudbright Stewartry (1708–15)			Sir Gilbert Eliott, 3rd Baronet, of Stobs
Lord	Charles Townshend	1769	1796	Tory	Great Yarmouth (1796 – 2 days)	Son of 1st Marquess Townshend, hence Lord.		Lord Frederick Townshend, his brother, who was insane
	Spencer Perceval	1762	1812	Tory	Northampton (1796-death)	Prime Minister of the United Kingdom (1809 to death), Chancellor of the Exchequer (1807 to death), Leader of the House of Commons (1807 to death) and Chancellor of the Duchy of Lancaster (1807 to death)	KC	John Bellingham
Sir	Charles Bampfylde, 5th Baronet	1753	1823	Whig	Exeter (1774–90 and 1796–1812)	High Sheriff of Somerset 1820		An ex-servant
	Nathaniel Sneyd	c. 1767	1833	Tory	County Cavan (1801–24)	High Sheriff of Cavan 1795	Previously Member of Parliament of Ireland	John Mason
Lord	William Russell	1767	1840	Whig	Surrey (1789–1807), Tavistock (1807–1819 and 1826–1831)	Lord of the Admiralty (1806–07)	Son of Francis Russell, Marquess of Tavistock, hence Lord	François Benjamin Courvoisier
The Earl of Mayo	Richard, Lord Naas	1822	1872	Conservative	Cockermouth (1857–1868)	Viceroy of India (1869 to death)	KP, GMSI, PC	Sher Ali Afridi
The Earl of Leitrim	William, Viscount Clements	1806	1878	Liberal	County Leitrim left Commons 1847			Disputed – Thomas and Patrick McGranahan or Michael McElwee and Neil Sheils
	James Sadleir	c. 1815	1881	Liberal	County Tipperary (1852–57)			A Swiss watch thief
Lord	Frederick Cavendish	1836	1882	Liberal	West Riding of Yorkshire North (1865 to death)	Chief Secretary for Ireland (1882 to death)	PC	Irish National Invincibles
Field Marshal Sir	Henry Hughes Wilson, 1st Baronet	1864	1922	Conservative and Unionist	North Down (February 1922 to death)	Chief of the Imperial General Staff (1918–22)	GCB, DSO	IRA
	Kevin O'Higgins	1892	1927	Sinn Féin	Queen's County (1918–22, though did not sit)	Later Minister for Justice in Irish Free State government 1927		IRA
Lord Moyne	Walter Guinness	1880	1944	Conservative and Unionist	Bury St Edmunds (1907–1931)	Leader of the House of Lords (1941–1942), Leader of the Conservative Party in the House of Lords (1941–1942) and Secretary of State for the Colonies (1941–1942)	DSO & Bar PC	Lehi
Sir	Richard Sharples	1916	1973	Conservative	Sutton and Cheam (1954–1972)	Governor of Bermuda (1972 to death)	KCMG OBE MC	Black Beret Cadre
Captain	Walter Scott-Elliot	1895	1977	Labour	Accrington (1945–1950)	Parliamentary Private Secretary to Financial Secretaries to the War Office (1945–1947)		Archibald Hall
	Airey Neave	1916	1979	Conservative	Abingdon (1953–death)	Shadow Secretary of State for Northern Ireland (1974–death)	DSO OBE MC TD	Irish National Liberation Army
The Rev	Robert Bradford	1941	1981	Ulster Vanguard (1974–78); Ulster Unionist Party (1978–death)	South Belfast (1974 to death)			Provisional IRA
Sir	Anthony Berry	1925	1984	Conservative	Enfield Southgate (1983 to death)	Treasurer of the Household (1983 to death)		Provisional IRA (Patrick Magee)
	Ian Gow	1937	1990	Conservative	Eastbourne (1974 to death)	Parliamentary Private Secretary to Margaret Thatcher the Prime Minister (1988 to death)	TD	Provisional IRA claimed responsibility; journalist Paul Routledge suggested possible involvement of the American Central Intelligence Agency (CIA) and intelligence community.
Baron Kaberry of Adel	Sir Donald Kaberry, 1st Baronet	1907	1991	Conservative	Leeds North West (1950–83)		MC TD	Provisional IRA (Carlton Club bombing)
	Jo Cox	1974	2016	Labour	Batley and Spen (2015 to death)			Thomas Mair, a far-right extremist
Sir	David Amess	1952	2021	Conservative	Southend West (1997 to death); Basildon (1983–1997)		Kt	Ali Harbi Ali, Islamic State supporter
Rt Hon	Ann Widdecombe	1947	2026	Conservative	Maidstone (1987–97); Maidstone and The Weald (1997–2010)	Parliamentary Under-Secretary of State for Public Health and Prevention (1990–93), Minister of State for Employment (1993–95), Minister of State for Prisons (1995–97)	DSG	Joshua Kerry (murder suspect)

=== Suicide ===
Title/Rank	Name known by while in Commons	Born	Died	Political Party	MP's Seat	Offices Held
	John Darras	c. 1355	1408		Shropshire (1393, 1404–06)	High Sheriff of Shropshire 1401
	Thomas Rymour		1408		Bath (1406)	
The Earl of Northumberland	Henry Percy	1532	1585		Morpeth 1554–55, Northumberland left Commons 1572	
	William Dodington		1600		Penryn (1571), Boston (1572)	
Baron Clifton	Gervase Clifton	c. 1579	1618		Huntingdonshire (1597–98, 1601)	
Sir	George Southcote	1572	1638		Plympton Erle (1597)	High Sheriff of Devon 1616
Sir	John Suckling	1609	1641?	Royalist	Bramber (30 April-5 May 1640)	
	Thomas Hoyle	1587	1650	Roundhead	City of York (1628–29 and 1640-death)	Lord Mayor of York 1632 and 1644
Sir	Henry Vane	1589	1655	Roundhead from 1641	Lostwithiel (1614), Carlisle (1621–26), Wilton (1640–53), Kent (1654-death)	PC, Treasurer of the Household (1639–41), Secretary of State (1640–41), Lord Lieutenant of Durham (1642)
Sir	William Morley	c. 1586	1658	Royalist	Chichester (1640–42)	
Baron Clifford of Chudleigh	Sir Thomas Clifford	1630	1673		Totnes (1660–72)	Comptroller of the Household (1666–1668), Treasurer of the Household (1668–1672), Lord High Treasurer (1672-till death) and PC
	Thomas Wyndham	c. 1647	1689	Tory	Wells (1685-death)	
	John Lamotte Honywood	1647	1694		Essex (1679–85 and 1693-death)	Gentleman of the Privy Chamber
Viscount Teviot	Robert Spencer	1629	1694		Great Bedwyn (1660), Brackley (1661–79)	
	John Hampden	1653	1696		Buckinghamshire (1679–81), Wendover (1681–85 and 1689–90)	
Sir	John Brownlow, 3rd Baronet	1659	1697	Tory	Grantham (1689-death)	High Sheriff of Lincolnshire 1688
Earl of Bath	Charles Granville, Lord Lansdown	1661	1701	Tory	Cornwall left Commons 1686	Lord Lieutenant of Cornwall and Devon (1691–1693), Lord of the Bedchamber (1692), also Count of the Holy Roman Empire
	Charles Bonython	c. 1653	1705	Tory	Westminster (1685–86)	
	Thomas Price	1680	1706	Tory	Weobley (1702–05)	
	Peter Gott	1653	1712	Whig	Hastings (1690–95 and 1698–1701), Sussex (1708–10), Lewes (1710-death)	
Sir	George Newland	c. 1646	1714	Tory	City of London (1710-death)	
	James Milner	After 1658	1721	Whig	Minehead (1717-death)	
	Humphry Morice	c. 1671	1731	Whig	Newport (Cornwall) (1713–22), Grampound (1722-death)	Governor of the Bank of England (1727–29)
	Abraham Blackmore	c. 1677	1732	Tory	Mitchell (1710–13), Newton (1713–15)	
Baron Herbert of Chirbury	Henry Herbert	c. 1678	1738	Whig	Bewdley left Commons 1709	
Earl of Scarbrough	Richard Lumley, Viscount Lumley	1686	1740	Whig	Arundel left Commons 1715	Colonel of the Coldstream Guards (1722 until death), Vice-Admiral of Durham (1710 until death), Lord Lieutenant of Northumberland (1722 until death), Custos Rotulorum of Northumberland (1722 until death) and KG, PC
Sir	Danvers Osborn, 3rd Baronet	1715	1753	Whig	Bedfordshire (1747 – June 1753)	Governor of Province of New York (June 1753-death)
Sir	John Bland, 6th Baronet	1722	1755	Whig	Ludgershall (1754-death)	
Baron Montfort	Mr Henry Bromley	1705	1755	Whig	Cambridgeshire (1727–41)	Lord Lieutenant of Cambridgeshire (1729–42)
The Duke of Bolton	Charles Powlett, Marquess of Winchester	1718	1765	Whig	Hampshire left Commons 1759	Lieutenant of the Tower of London 1754–1760, Lord Lieutenant of Hampshire 1758–1763 and Vice-Admiral of Dorset and Hampshire (1759 until death) and KCB, PC
Sir	Herbert Lloyd, 1st Baronet	c. 1719	1769	Tory	Cardigan Boroughs (1761–68)	
	Peter Delmé	1710	1770	Whig	Ludgershall (1734–41), Southampton left Commons 1754	
	Charles Yorke	1722	1770	Whig	Reigate (1747–68), University of Cambridge (1768-death)	Lord Chancellor (1770), also PC
	Jenison Shafto	c. 1728	1771	Tory	Leominster (1761–68) and Castle Rising (1768-death)	
	William Fitzherbert	1712	1772	Tory	Derby (1762-death)	
The Duke of Atholl	Mr John Murray	1729	1774	Tory	Perthshire left Commons 1764	KT PC
	Baron Clive of Plassey	1725	1774	Tory	Mitchell (1754–55), Shrewsbury (1762-death)	Irish peer so could sit in Commons; KB FRS; Commander-in-Chief, India (1756–60, 1765–67), Lord Lieutenant of Shropshire (1772-death)
	John Damer	1744	1776	Whig	Gatton (1768–74)	Son of 1st Baron Milton, hence Honourable
Sir	George Hay	1715	1778	Tory	Stockbridge (1754–56), Calne (1757–61), Sandwich (1761–68), Newcastle-under-Lyme (1768-death)	Lord of Admiralty (1756–57, 1757–65), Judge of High Court of Admiralty (1774-death)
	Hans Stanley	1721	1780	Whig (until 1747), Tory (from 1747)	Southampton (1754-death)	Governor of the Isle of Wight (1764–1766) and (1770–1780) Vice-Admiral of the Isle of Wight (1765–1767) and (1771–1780) PC
	Robert Mayne	1724	1782	Tory	Gatton (1774-death)	
	William Skrine	1721?	1783	Tory	Callington (1771–80)	
	John Pardoe	c. 1756	1796	Tory	Camelford (1780–84), Plympton Erle (1784–90), West Looe (1790-death)	
	Trench Chiswell	c. 1735	1797	Tory	Aldborough (1790-death)	High Sheriff of Essex 1776
Colonel	William Crosbie	c. 1740	1798	Tory	Newark (1790–96)	Lieutenant Governor of Portsmouth 1798
Sir	Godfrey Webster, 4th Baronet (surnamed Vassall 1795–97)	1747	1800	Whig, Radicals	Seaford (1786–90), Wareham (1796-death)	
	Arthur Hill, 2nd Marquess of Downshire	1753	1801	Tory	Lostwithiel (1774–1780), Malmesbury (1780–83)	PC, FRS; Irish peer so could sit in House of Commons, also member Parliament of Ireland; High Sheriff of County Down 1785
	James Paull	1770	1808	Whig	Newtown (Isle of Wight) (1805–06)	
	William Eden	1782	1810	Grenvillite Whig	Woodstock (1806–death)	Teller of the Receipt of the Exchequer 1806–10; Eden drowned in the River Thames; it was not known if his death was suicide or not.
Major-General Sir	William Erskine, 2nd Baronet	1770	1813	Tory	Fife (1796–1800 and 1801–06)	
	Samuel Whitbread	1764	1815	Whig	Bedford (1790–1800, 1801-death)	
Sir	Samuel Romilly	1757	1818	Whig	Horsham (1807–08), Wareham (1808–12), Arundel (1812–18), Westminster (July 1818-death)	KC, Solicitor General 1806–07
Admiral Sir	George Campbell	1759	1821		Carmarthen borough (1806–13)	GCB Commander-in-Chief, Portsmouth 1818-death
The Marquess of Londonderry	Robert Stewart, Viscount Castlereagh	1769	1822	Tory	Tregony (1794–96), Orford (1796–97 and 1821-death), Down (1801–05 and 1812–21), Boroughbridge (1806), Plympton Erle (1806–12) and Clitheroe (1812)	Irish Peer so could sit in House of Commons; Foreign Secretary (1812-death), Leader of the House of Commons (1812-death) and KG, GCH, PC, PC (Ire); previously Member of Parliament of Ireland
Viscount Newcomen	Thomas Gleadowe-Newcomen	1776	1825		County Longford (1802–06)	Son of 1st Viscount Newcomen, hence Honourable; High Sheriff of Longford 1801
Colonel	James Hamilton Stanhope	1788	1825		Buckingham (1817–18), Fowey (1818–19), Dartmouth (1822-death)	Son of 3rd Earl Stanhope, hence Honourable.
Baron Graves	Thomas, Baron Graves	1775	1830	Tory	Okehampton (1812–18), Windsor (1819–20), Milborne Port (1820–27)	Irish Peer so could sit in Commons.
	John Calcraft	1765	1831	Whig, but Tory 1828–30	Wareham (1786–90, 1800–06, 1818–31), Rochester (1806–18), Dorset (June 1831-death)	PC, Clerk of the Ordnance (1806–07), Paymaster of the Forces (1828–30)
	James Bradshaw	1786	1833	Tory	Brackley (1825–32)	
General Sir	Rufane Shaw Donkin	1773	1841	Whig	Berwick-upon-Tweed (1832–37), Sandwich (1839-death)	GCH KCB
Baron Congleton	Henry Brooke Parnell	1776	1842	Whig	Queen's County (1802 and 1806–32), Portarlington (1802), Dundee (1832–41)	PC; Secretary at War (1831–33), Paymaster General (1836–41)
Sir	Augustus Foster, 1st Baronet	1780	1848		Cockermouth (1812–13)	GCH PC; British Minister to the United States (1811–12), Minister to Denmark (1814–24), Minister at Turin (1824–40)
Sir	Henry St John Carew St John-Mildmay, 4th Baronet	1787	1848		Winchester (1807–18)	
	George Spence	1787	1850	Tory	Reading (1826–27), Ripon (1829–32)	KC
	Charles Russell	1786	1856		Reading (1830–37 and 1841–47)	
	John Sadleir	1813	1856	Independent Irish Party	Carlow (1847–53), Sligo (1853-death)	Junior Lord of the Treasury (1853–54)
	George Drought Warburton	1816	1857	Independent Liberal	Harwich (March 1857-death)	
Vice-Admiral	Robert Fitzroy	1805	1865	Conservative	Durham left Commons 1843	Governor of New Zealand (1843–45)
The Lord Glenalmond	George Patton	1803	1869	Conservative	Bridgwater (1865–66)	PC, Solicitor General for Scotland 1859, Lord Advocate 1866
Sir	Robert Harvey, 1st Baronet	1817	1870	Conservative	Thetford (1865–68)	
Lord	Arthur Clinton	1840	1870	Liberal	Newark left Commons 1868	
	Isaac Fletcher	1827	1879	Liberal	Cockermouth (1868-death)	FRS
Earl of Shaftesbury	Anthony Ashley-Cooper, Lord Ashley	1831	1886	Liberal	Cricklade left Commons in 1865	
	John Kynaston Cross	1832	1887	Liberal	Bolton left Commons 1885	Under-Secretary of State for India (1883–85)
Sir	William Tindal Robertson	1825	1889	Conservative	Brighton (1886-death)	
The Duke of Bedford	Francis Russell	1820	1891	Liberal	Bedfordshire left Commons in 1872	KG
	James Lloyd Ashbury	1834	1895	Conservative	Brighton (1874–80)	
The Marquess of Waterford	John Beresford, Earl of Tyrone	1844	1895	Conservative	County Waterford (1865–66)	KP, PC (GB and Ire);Lord Lieutenant of Waterford 1874-death
Sir	Edward Hulse, 6th Baronet	1859	1903	Conservative	Salisbury (1886–97)	
	Reginald Jaffray Lucas	1865	1914	Conservative	Portsmouth (1906–10)	
Viscount Harcourt	Lewis Harcourt	1863	1922	Liberal	Rossendale left Commons in 1916	Secretary of State for the Colonies (1910–1915) and PC
	Hugh Meyler	1875	1929	Liberal	Blackpool (1923–24)	
Sir	John Norton-Griffiths, 1st Baronet	1871	1930	Conservative	Wednesbury (1910–18), Wandsworth Central (1918–24)	KCB DSO
	Edward Marjoribanks	1900	1932	Conservative	Eastbourne (1929-death)	
Lieutenant-Colonel	Anthony Muirhead	1890	1939	Conservative Party	Wells (1929-death)	Parliamentary Under-Secretary for India and Burma (1938-till death) and MC & Bar TD
Sir	Charles Cayzer	1896	1940	Conservative Party	City of Chester (1922–death)	
	John Edmondson Whittaker	1897	1945	Labour Party	Heywood and Radcliffe (1945–death)	
Mrs	Mavis Tate	1893	1947	Conservative Party	Willesden West (1931–35) and Frome (1935–45)	
Mr (later Reverend)	George Maitland Lloyd Davies	1880	1949	Independent Christian Pacifist	University of Wales (January–October 1924)	
	Thomas William Stamford	1882	1949	Labour Party	Leeds West (1923–31) (1945–death)	
Sir	Albert Braithwaite	1893	1959	Conservative Party	Buckrose (1926–45), Harrow West (1951-death)	DSO
	Arthur, The Earl Castle Stewart	1889	1961	Conservative	Harborough (1929–33)	MC
	Bernard Floud	1915	1967	Labour Party	Acton (1964-death)	Not in office but was classified as a traitor to the UK for being a secret KGB Russian Spy
	Alan Grahame Brown	1913	1972	Labour Party, had joined the Conservative Party by time of death	Tottenham left Commons in 1964	
	Desmond Donnelly	1920	1974	Labour Party, had joined the Conservative Party by time of death	Pembrokeshire left Commons in 1970	
	Jocelyn Cadbury	1946	1982	Conservative Party	Birmingham Northfield (1979-death)	
	John Heddle	1943	1989	Conservative Party	Lichfield and Tamworth (1979–83), Mid Staffordshire (1983-death)	
	Gordon McMaster	1960	1997	Labour Party	Paisley South (1990-death)	
Sir	Peter Smithers	1913	2006	Conservative Party	Winchester (1950–64)	Parliamentary Under Secretary of State, Foreign Office (1962–64); Secretary General of the Council of Europe (1964–69)

The Irish republican Bobby Sands died while on hunger strike in May 1981; he had been elected as an "Anti-H-Block" MP for Fermanagh and South Tyrone in April 1981, although he never took his seat as he was in prison. Although hunger strike deaths are arguably self-inflicted, they are not conventually considered "suicides."

=== Disappeared ===
Title/Rank	Name known by while in Commons	Born	Disappeared	Political Party	MP's Seat	Offices Held	Honours
	George Robinson	before 1727	1732		Great Marlow (1731–32 but never sat)		
Sir	Orlando Bridgeman, 2nd Baronet	1678	1738 (about 5 months) – died 1746	Whig	Dunwich (1734–38)	Commissioner of the Board of Trade, Governor of Barbados (1737–38)	
	Henry Vansittart	1732	1769		Reading (1768-death)	Governor of Bengal (1759–64)	
Sir	Montagu Chapman, 3rd Baronet	1808	1852	Whig Party	County Westmeath (1832–41)	High Sheriff of Westmeath 1844	
	Walter Powell	1842	1881	Conservative Party	Malmesbury (1868–death)		
	Victor Grayson	1881	1920	Independent Labour	Colne Valley (1907–1910)		
	Henry Newton Knights	1872	1921 (some 2 weeks) – died 1959	Conservative Party	Camberwell North (1918–21)	Mayor of Camberwell 1913, Sheriff of the City of London 1920	MBE
	John Stonehouse	1925	1974 (34 days) – died 1988	Labour Party	Walsall North (1974–1976)	Postmaster-General (1968–1969)	

=== Executed, died in prison or escaped justice ===
Title/Rank	Name	Born	Executed/Died	Crime accused of	MP's Seat	Offices Held, Honours/Political Party
Sir	Andrew Harclay	c. 1270	1323 (Hanged, drawn and quartered)	High treason in making treaty with Scotland	Cumberland (1312)	Sheriff of Cumberland 1311 and 1319, Lord Warden of the West Marches 1322
	Adam de Peshall	c. 1300	1346 (Killed resisting arrest, having escaped from prison in Stafford)	Cause of imprisonment unspecified	Staffordshire 1341	Sheriff of Shropshire and Staffordshire 1341
The Baron Beauchamp of Kidderminster	John Beauchamp	1339	1388 (Beheaded)	High treason (under Merciless Parliament)	Worcestershire (1377)	
Sir	James Berners	1361	1388 (Beheaded)	Put to death by Merciless Parliament for 'exploiting' Richard II	Surrey (1386)	
Sir	Nicholas Brembre		1388 (Hanged)	High treason, corruption and executions without trial	City of London (1383)	Sheriff of London 1372, Lord Mayor of London 1377 and 1383
Sir	Robert Tresilian		1388 (Hanged)	High treason, corruption, misuses of judicial office (under Merciless Parliament)	Cornwall (1369)	Chief Justice of the King's Bench 1381–1387
Sir	Roger Perwych		October 1388 (prosecuted but died before judgement brought)	Armed assault	Leicestershire (1379, 1382, 1383, September 1388-death)	Sheriff of Warwickshire and Leicestershire (1377)
Sir	John Bussy		1399 (Beheaded at Bristol)	High treason (under Henry IV having supported Richard II)	Lincolnshire (1383–1385, 1388–1397), Rutland (1391–1393)	Speaker of the House of Commons (1394–1398), High Sheriff of Lincolnshire (1383, 1385, 1390)
Sir	Henry Green	c. 1347	1399 (Beheaded, with Bussy)	High treason (same cause as Bussy)	Huntingdonshire (1390), Northamptonshire (1394–1397), Wiltshire (1397-death)	
Sir	Thomas Blount		1400 (Hanged, drawn and quartered at Oxford)	Participation in Epiphany Rising against Henry IV	Oxfordshire (1381–1382)	
Sir	Thomas Shelley		1400 (Hanged at Tyburn)	Treason, implicated in Epiphany Rising	Buckinghamshire (1397)	
	Thomas Wintershall	c. 1364	1400 (beheaded)	Treason, joined in Epiphany Rising	Surrey (1397)	
	Roger Cheyne	1362	1414 (Died in the Tower)	Lollard Oldcastle Rising	Buckinghamshire (1404)	
Sir	John Cornwall	c. 1366	1414 (indicted but died before trial)	Harbouring murderer	Shropshire (1402, 1407)	High Sheriff of Shropshire 1399, 1403, 1405
Sir	John Oldcastle		1417 (Hanged and burnt)	Heresy as Lollard rebel	Herefordshire (1404)	High Sheriff of Herefordshire 1406
	John Ninezergh		1420 (Died in exile in France having abjured the English realm)	Homicide in 1414	Appleby 1406	
Sir	William Tresham	1404	1450 (Indicted but murdered before trial)	High treason concerning Jack Cade rebellion	Northamptonshire (1423-death)	Speaker of the House of Commons (1449-death)
Sir	Thomas Browne	1402	1460 (Hanged)	High treason	Dover (1439–1444), Kent (1445–1446), Wallingford 1449–1450	Chancellor of the Exchequer (1440–1450), High Sheriff for Kent in 1443–1444 and JP for Surrey from 20 July 1454 to death
Sir	William Bonville	c. 1392/1393	1461 (Beheaded after capture in Second Battle of St Albans)		Somerset (1421), Devon (1422, 1425, 1427)	KG, High Sheriff of Devon (1423)
Sir	Thomas Kyriell	c. 1396	1461 (Beheaded after capture in Second Battle of St Albans)		Somerset (1421–1425)	
Sir	Thomas Tuddenham	1401	1462 (Beheaded at the Tower)	High treason implicated in plot to murder Edward IV	Suffolk (1431–1432), Norfolk (1432, 1435, 1442)	Lancastrian; High Sheriff of Norfolk and Suffolk 1432, Master of the Great Wardrobe (1446–1450), Treasurer of the Household (1458–1460)
Sir	Thomas Tresham		1471 (Beheaded)	High treason	Northamptonshire	Speaker of the House of Commons (1459) & PC
Sir	Gervase Clifton		1471 (Beheaded)	High treason	Kent (1455)	Treasurer of the Household and Treasurer of Calais (1450–1460), High Sheriff of Kent 1439, 1450, 1458
Sir	John Delves	c. 1418	1471 (Beheaded)	High treason	Staffordshire (1467–1468)	Warden of the Mint 1471
Sir	Thomas Vaughan	c. 1410	1483 (Executed at Pontefract)	Put to death in Richard III's coup	Cornwall (1478–1483)	High Sheriff of Surrey and Sussex 1464, Master of the King's Jewels 1465
Sir	George Browne	1440	1483 (Beheaded at the Tower)	High treason for part in Buckingham's rising against Richard III	Guildford (1472), Surrey (1478), Canterbury (1483-death)	Son of Sir Thomas Browne and stepson of Sir Thomas Vaughan (above); Yorkist to 1483, then Lancastrian; High Sheriff of Kent 1480
Sir	William Catesby	1450	1485 (Beheaded after capture in Battle of Bosworth)	Put to death after Lancastrian victory over Richard III	Northamptonshire (1484-death)	Yorkist; also Speaker of the House of Commons and Chancellor of the Exchequer
	Thomas Flamank		1497 (Hanged, drawn and quartered)	Co-leader Cornish rebellion of 1497	Bodmin 1492	
Sir	James Tyrrell	c. 1455	1502 (Executed)	High treason	Cornwall (1483)	Yorkist in parliament. Governor of Guînes 1486–1501
Sir	Richard Empson	c. 1450	1510 (Beheaded)	High treason	Northamptonshire	Speaker of the House of Commons (1510) & PC
Sir	Edmund Dudley	1462	1510 (Beheaded)	High treason	Sussex	Speaker of the House of Commons (1503) & PC
Sir	Robert Sheffield	Before 1462	1518 (Died in the Tower)	Complaints against Cardinal Wolsey and falsely obtaining pardon	City of London (1495, 1497, 1504), Lincolnshire (1512–1515)	Speaker of the House of Commons 1512; Recorder of the City of London 1495–1508
Saint Sir	Thomas More	1478	1535 (Beheaded)	High treason	Middlesex	Speaker of the House of Commons (1523), Chancellor of the Duchy of Lancaster (1525–1529), Lord Chancellor (1529–1532) and Master of Requests (1517) & PC
	John Rastell	c. 1475	1536 (Died in gaol)	Anti-church statements	Launceston	
Sir	Francis Bigod	1507	1537 (Hanged, drawn and quartered at Tyburn)	High treason, led Catholic rising against Henry VIII	Seats unknown (1529 and 1536)	
The Lord Hussey of Sleaford	John Hussey	1465/1466	1536/1537 (Beheaded at Lincoln)	Conspiracy, implicated in Pilgrimage of Grace	Lincolnshire (1515–1529)	High Sheriff of Lincolnshire 1493, custos rotulorum of Lincolnshire by 1513
Sir	Richard Tempest	c. 1480	1537 (died awaiting trial at Fleet Prison	Implicated in Pilgrimage of Grace)	Appleby (1529–1536)	High Sheriff of Yorkshire 1516
	Thomas Moigne	c. 1509	1537 (Hanged, drawn and quartered at Lincoln)	High treason, involved in Lincolnshire Rising	Lincoln (1536–death)	
Sir	Nicholas Carew	c. 1496	1539 (Beheaded at the Tower)	High treason, implicated in Exeter Conspiracy	Surrey (1529–1536)	KG, Sheriff of Surrey and Sussex 1519, Master of the Horse (1522-death)
The Earl of Essex	Thomas Cromwell	c. 1485	1540 (Beheaded at the Tower)	High treason and heresy	Unknown English seat (1523), Taunton (1529–1536)	KG PC; Secretary of State (1533–1536), Chancellor of the Exchequer (1533–1540), Master of the Rolls (1534–1536), Lord Privy Seal (1536–1540), Lord Great Chamberlain 1540
	Giles Heron	by 1504	1540 (Hanged at Tyburn)	High treason	Thetford (1529)	
The Lord Seymour of Sudeley	Thomas Seymour	c. 1509	1547 (Executed at the Tower)	High treason	Wiltshire (left Commons 1547)	KG, Master General of the Ordnance (1544–1547), Lord Warden of the Cinque Ports (1545), Lord High Admiral of England (1547–1549)
Sir	Thomas Arundell	c. 1502	1552 (Beheaded)	High treason	Dorset (1545 and 1547)	KB, Receiver-General of the Duchy of Cornwall, High Sheriff of Dorset and Somerset (1531)
Sir	Michael Stanhope	by 1508	1552 (Beheaded)	Conspiracy to murder in same plot as Arundell	Nottinghamshire (1545-death)	
Sir	Ralph Vane	By 1510	1552 (hanged)	High treason, conspiracy to murder	Unknown seat (recorded 1549)	
The Duke of Northumberland	John Dudley	c. 1504	1553 (Beheaded)	High treason in placing Jane Grey on throne and attempted arrest of Mary Tudor	Kent (1534–1536), Staffordshire (1542)	KG, PC; Lord High Admiral (1543–1547), Lord Great Chamberlain (1547–1550), Lord President of the Council, Warden General of the Scottish Marches and Lord Lieutenant of Warwickshire (1550–1553)
Sir	John Gates	by 1504	1553 (Beheaded)	High treason	Essex (1547–death)	KB, PC; Captain of the Yeomen of the Guard, Chancellor of the Duchy of Lancaster
Sir	Thomas Wyatt	1521	1554 (Hanged, drawn and quartered)	High treason, rebellion against Mary I	Kent (1547–1553)	
	William Thomas	by 1524	1554 (Hanged, drawn and quartered)	High treason, accused of plotting assassination of Mary I	Old Sarum (1547), Downton (1553)	Clerk of the Privy Council to 1553
Sir	Anthony Kingston	c. 1508	1556 (Arrested but died before justice could be brought)	Conspiracy to place Princess Elizabeth on throne.	Gloucestershire (1539–1553, 1555-death)	High Sheriff of Gloucestershire 1533 and 1550, Constable of the Tower of London 1546, Provost Marshal 1549, Knight Marshal of Parliament 1555
	Edward Lewkenor	1516/1517	1556 (died in the Tower pending execution)	Treason in plotting to murder Queen Mary Tudor	Horsham (1553)	
	Henry Peckham	by 1526	1556 (Hanged)	High treason for plotting rising against Queen Mary Tudor	Wycombe (1553–1555)	
Sir	Edward Waldegrave	c. 1516	1561 (died in the Tower)	Allowing Mass celebration at home	Wiltshire (1553), Somerset (1554), Essex (1558–1559)	PC, Chancellor of the Duchy of Lancaster (1554–1558), Master of the Great Wardrobe to 1558
The Blessed	John Story	c. 1504	1571 (hanged, drawn and quartered at Tyburn)	High treason for complicity in Rising of the North	Salisbury (1545–1547), Hindon (1547–1549), East Grinstead (1553–1554), Bramber (April–November 1554), Bath (1554–1555), Ludgershall (1555–1558), Downton (1559–1562)	Commissioner of heresy 1558
The Blessed The 7th Earl of Northumberland	Thomas Percy	1528	1571 (Beheaded in York)	High treason for complicity in Rising of the North	Westmorland (1554–1555)	KG
	Leonard Dacre	by 1533	1573 (died in exile at Brussels)	Evaded arrest for part in the Rising of the North	Cumberland (1558–1570)	
The 8th Earl of Northumberland	Henry Percy	1532	1585 (died in the Tower-possible suicide)	High treason	Morpeth (1554–1555), Northumberland (left Commons 1572)	Brother of 7th Earl of Northumberland, above
	William Parry		1585 (expelled from Parliament and beheaded)	High treason for considering assassination of Elizabeth I	Queenborough (1584–1585)	
	Brian Fowler	c. 1520	1587 (died at home on parole)	Recusancy	Staffordshire (1558)	
Sir	Thomas Fitzherbert	1518	1591 (died in the Tower)	Recusancy	Staffordshire (1545–1547)	High Sheriff of Staffordshire 1544 and 1555
Sir	John Perrot	1528	1592 (died in the Tower)	Treason	Carmarthenshire (1547), Sandwich (1553, 1555), Wareham (1559), Pembrokeshire (1563), Haverfordwest (1588-death)	PC, Lord Deputy of Ireland (1584–1588)
Sir	Francis Englefield	c. 1522	1596 (died in exile in Spain)	Outlawed in absence for Treason over Catholic plot against Elizabeth I in 1578	Berkshire (1553–1558)	PC, High Sheriff of Oxfordshire and Berkshire 1547, Master of the Court of Wards
Sir	Peter Wentworth	1524	1596 (Died in the Tower)	For claiming Parliamentary privileges	Northampton (1586–1593)	
Sir	Gelly Meyrick	c. 1556	1601 (hanged at Tyburn)	Participation in Earl of Essex's rising	Carmarthen borough (1588–1593), Pembrokeshire (1597–1598)	
Sir	Christopher Blount	c. 1556	1601 (Beheaded)	High treason (Essex rising)	Staffordshire (1593–1598)	
Sir	Charles Danvers	1568	1601 (Beheaded)	High treason (Essex rising)	Cirencester (1586–1593)	
	John Lyttelton	1561	1601 (Reprieved from execution but died in the Queen's Bench Prison)	High treason (Essex rising)	Worcestershire (1584, 1586, 1597)	
Sir	Walter Leveson	1550	1602 (died in Fleet Prison)	debtor (arising from piracy lawsuits)	Shropshire (1584, 1586–1587, 1588–1589), Newcastle-under-Lyme (1597–1598)	
	Thomas Ryvett	1553	1610 (Died in King's Bench Prison)	Debtor	Orford (1597), Aldeburgh (1604-death)	
Sir	Walter Raleigh	c. 1554	1618 (Beheaded)	High treason (participation in Main Plot against King James I)	Devonshire (1584–1587), Mitchell (1593–1597), Dorset (1597–1598), Cornwall (1601)	Warden of the Stannaries (1585), Lord Lieutenant of Cornwall (1585), Vice-admiral of Devon and Cornwall, (1585)
The Lord Clifton	Gervase Clifton	c. 1579	1618 (committed suicide in Fleet Prison)	Threatening Attorney-General Sir Francis Bacon over survey of his estates.	Huntingdonshire left Commons 1604	
Sir	Roger Dalison	c. 1562	1620 (died in Fleet Prison)	Debtor	Malmesbury, 1604, 1614	Lieutenant-General of the Ordnance
The Earl of Castlehaven	Mervyn Tuchet	c. 1588	1631 (beheaded on Tower Hill)	Sodomy and rape	Dorset (1614)	
Sir	John Eliot	1592	1632 (died in the Tower)	For claiming parliamentary privileges against the King's order and King's Bench Court	St Germans 1614, Newport (Isle of Wight) 1628–1629	Vice-Admiral of Devon (1618)
Sir	Cuthbert Halsall	c. 1573	1632 (died in Fleet Prison)	Debtor	Lancashire 1614	
The Earl of Strafford	Thomas Wentworth	1593	1641 (Beheaded)	High treason	Yorkshire	Lord Lieutenant of Yorkshire (1628 until death), Custos Rotulorum of the West Riding of Yorkshire (1630 until death) and Lord Lieutenant of Ireland (1640 until death), KG, PC
Sir	John Suckling	1609	1641? (committed suicide in exile in Paris)	High treason, implicated in First Army Plot, found guilty in absence	Bramber (30 Apr-5 May 1640)	
	Nathaniel Tomkins	1584	1643 (Hanged)	Joining Royalist "Waller Plot" against Parliament	Carlisle (1614–1621), Christchurch (1621–1629)	
	Henry Benson	c. 1578/1579	1643 (died in prison)	Debtor	Knaresborough (1626–1629 and 1640–1641)	Royalist
The Lord Montagu of Boughton	Edward Montagu	1563	1644 (Died prisoner of Parliament at Savoy Hospital)	For being a Royalist	Bere Alston (1584–1586), Tavistock (1597–1601), Brackley (1601–1604), Northamptonshire (1604–1621)	KB
Sir	Alexander Carew, 2nd Baronet	1609	1644 (Beheaded)	For being a Royalist	Cornwall (1640–1643)	Brother of regicide John Carew
Sir	John Bankes	1589	1644 (Died before impeachment by Parliament)	High treason	Wootton Bassett (1624), Morpeth (1626–1629)	PC, Chief Justice of the Common Pleas (1640-death)
Sir	John Hotham, 1st Baronet the Elder	c. 1589	1645 (Beheaded)	For betraying the Parliamentarians to the Royalists	Beverley	
Sir	John Hotham the Younger	1610	1645 (Beheaded)	For betraying the Parliamentarians to the Royalists	Scarborough	
Sir	Alexander Denton	1596	1645 (died in Tower of London)	Royalist in Civil war	Wendover (1624–1625), Buckingham (1625–1626, 1640–1644)	
Sir	Richard Baker	c. 1568	1645 (died in Fleet Prison)	debtor	Arundel (1593–1597), East Grinstead (1597–1601)	High Sheriff of Oxfordshire 1620
	Edward Bridgeman	after 1588	1646 (died prisoner of Parliament while being escorted to London)	Being a Royalist	Wigan (1625 and 1628–1629), Liverpool (1626)	
Sir	Philip Stapleton	1603	1647 (Died in exile at Calais evaded impeachment by Parliament)	High treason	Hedon (1640), Boroughbridge (1640–1647)	
Sir	Robert Heath	1575	1649 (Died in exile at Calais evaded impeachment by Parliament)	High treason	City of London (1621–1622), East Grinstead (1624–1625)	Solicitor General (1621–1625), Attorney General (1625–1631), Chief Justice of the Common Pleas (1631–1634), Lord Chief Justice (1642–1645)
The Earl of Holland	Henry Rich	1590	1649 (Beheaded at Tower of London)	High treason in leading rising against Parliament	Leicester (1610–1614)	KG KB PC
	John Blakiston	1603	1649 (Died before justice could be brought – Estate confiscated)	Regicide of Charles I	Newcastle upon Tyne (1640-death)	Mayor of Newcastle
Sir	Peregrine Pelham		1650 (Died before justice could be brought)	Regicide of Charles I	Kingston upon Hull	Mayor of Kingston upon Hull 1649
Colonel	John Moore	1599	1650 (Died before justice could be brought)	Regicide of Charles I	Liverpool (1640-death)	Parliamentary Governor of Liverpool 1645, Governor of Dublin 1649-death
	John Venn	1586	1650 (Died before justice could be brought)	Regicide of Charles I	City of London (1640-death)	Governor of Windsor Castle 1642–1645
The Earl of Derby	James Stanley	1607	1651 (Beheaded in Bolton)	High treason for being a Royalist	Liverpool (1625)	KG KB
	Clement Walker		1651 (died in Tower without trial)	High treason (dissident Parliamentarian)	Wells (1645–1648)	
Colonel	John Alured	1607	1651 (Died before justice could be brought)	Regicide of Charles I	Hedon	
General	Henry Ireton	1611	1651 (posthumous execution of hanged, drawn and quartered)	Regicide of Charles I	Appleby	Lord Deputy of Ireland (1650 until death)
Sir	Gregory Norton, 1st Baronet	1603	1652 (Died before justice could be brought)	Regicide of Charles I	Midhurst	
	Robert Jones	c. 1596	1653 (last recorded as prisoner in the Marshalsea)	debtor	Caernarvon Boroughs (1625–1626) and Flintshire (1628–1629)	Sheriff of Caernarvonshire 1643, Royalist Governor of Caernarvon Castle 1643–1646
Colonel	Humphrey Mackworth	1603	1654 (Died before justice could be brought;body exhumed from Westminster Abbey and reburied in a communal burial pit after the Restoration)	Regicide of Charles I but did not sign death warrant	Shropshire (February 1654-death)	Parliamentarian governor of Shrewsbury 1645-death)
Sir	William Constable, 1st Baronet	1590	1655 (Died before justice could be brought; body exhumed from Westminster Abbey and reburied in a communal burial pit after the Restoration)	Regicide of Charles I	Scarborough	
Sir	Thomas Mauleverer, 1st Baronet	1599	1655 (Died before justice could be brought, though his son fought for the Royalists and was allowed to keep the Baronetcy)	Regicide of Charles I	Boroughbridge	JP
Colonel	Anthony Stapley	1590	1655 (Died before justice could be brought)	Regicide of Charles I	Sussex	Governor of Chichester and Vice-Admiral of Sussex
Sir	John Danvers	c. 1585	1655 (Died before justice could be brought)	Regicide of Charles I	Malmesbury	Brother of Sir Charles Danvers (executed 1601)
The Lord Grey of Groby	Thomas Grey	1623	1657 (Died before justice could be brought)	Regicide of Charles I	Leicester	
	John Fry	1609	1657 (Died before justice could be brought – estate confiscated)	Regicide of Charles I but did not sign death warrant	Shaftesbury (1647–1651)	
Lord General	Oliver Cromwell	1599	1658 (Posthumous execution of hanged and beheaded)	Regicide of Charles I	Huntingdon (1628–1629), Cambridge (1640–1649), Cambridgeshire (1653)	Roundhead; Lord Protector (1653-death); great-great nephew of Thomas Cromwell, father-in-law of Henry Ireton above.
	Francis Allen	c. 1583	1658 (Died before justice could be brought – Estate confiscated)	Regicide of Charles I but did not sign death warrant	Cockermouth (1642–1653)	
	Humphrey Edwards	1582	1658 (Died before justice could be brought)	Regicide of Charles I	Shropshire	Chief Usher of the Exchequer (1650) and Commissioner of South Wales (1651)
Sir	Henry Slingsby, 1st Baronet	1602	1658 (Beheaded)	For being a Royalist	Knaresborough	
	John Bradshaw	1602	1659 (posthumous execution of hanged and beheaded)	Regicide of Charles I	Stafford (1654 but did not sit), Cheshire (1654 – but did not sit – and 1659)	Roundhead; Chancellor of the Duchy of Lancaster (1649–1654 and 1658–1659)
	William Purefoy	1580	1659 (Died before justice could be brought – Estate confiscated)	Regicide of Charles I	Warwick	
Sir	John Bourchier	c. 1595	1660 (Too ill to be tried and died soon after the Restoration in 1660)	Regicide of Charles I	Ripon (1647–1653)	JP
Major-General	Thomas Harrison	1606	1660 (hanged, drawn and quartered)	Regicide of Charles I	Wendover	
Colonel	Francis Hacker		1660 (hanged, drawn and quartered)	Regicide of Charles I	Leicestershire (1658–1659)	
	John Carew	1622	1660 (hanged, drawn and quartered)	Regicide of Charles I, also brother of Sir Alexander Carew, 2nd Baronet	Tregony	
	Gregory Clement	1594	1660 (hanged, drawn and quartered)	Regicide of Charles I	Fowey	
	Thomas Scot		1660 (hanged, drawn and quartered)	Regicide of Charles I	Wycombe	
	James Chaloner	1602	1660 (Died before justice could be brought)	Regicide of Charles I though did not sign	Aldborough (1648–1653)	Governor of the Isle of Man (1655-death)
Colonel	John Jones	c. 1597	1661 (Hanged, drawn and quartered)	Regicide of Charles I	Merionethshire (1647–1653 and 1656–1659)	Brother-in-law of Oliver Cromwell
	Isaac Penington	1584	(Died in the Tower of London) 1661	Regicide of Charles I though did not sign	City of London	
	Valentine Walton	1594	1661 (Escaped to Germany)	Regicide of Charles I	Huntingdon	
	Simon Mayne	1612	1661 (Died in the Tower of London)	Regicide of Charles I	Aylesbury	
Sir	Henry Vane the Younger	1613	1662 (Beheaded at the Tower)	high treason against Charles II	Kingston upon Hull (1640–1653, 1659–1660)	Roundhead; Governor of Massachusetts 1636–1637; son of [Henry Vane the Elder]
Major-General Sir	John Barkstead		1662 (hanged, drawn and quartered)	Regicide of Charles I	Middlesex	Governor of Reading and Steward of Cromwell's Household
Colonel	John Okey	1606	1662 (hanged, drawn and quartered)	Regicide of Charles I	Bedfordshire	
	Miles Corbet	1595	1662 (hanged, drawn and quartered)	Regicide of Charles I	Great Yarmouth	Clerk of the Court of Wards
	Peter Temple	c. 1599	1663 (died in the Tower)	Regicide of Charles I	Leicester (1645–1653)	
Sir	John Hutchinson	1615	1664 (Imprisoned in Sandown Castle, Kent where he died on 11 September 1664)	Regicide of Charles I, implication in Yorkshire Plot	Nottingham	
Sir	John Lisle	1610	1664 (Escaped but then murdered)	Regicide of Charles I though did not sign	Southampton	
	Augustine Garland	1603	Last reported 1664 (Confiscation and imprisonment, later sentenced to transportation))	Regicide of Charles I	Queenborough (1648–1653, 1654–1656, 1659)	
Sir	Henry Mildmay	1593	1664 (Stripped of knighthood and died whilst being transported to Tangier)	Regicide of Charles I though did not sign	Maldon	Master of the Kings Jewel House (1620)
Colonel	Robert Lilburne	1613	1665 (Life imprisonment)	Regicide of Charles I	East Riding of Yorkshire	Governor of Newcastle upon Tyne
Sir	Michael Livesay, 1st Baronet	1614	Unknown – last reported 1665 (Fled to Netherlands before Justice could be brought)	Regicide of Charles I	Queenborough	High Sheriff of Kent (1643, 1655 & 1656)
Colonel	John Downes	1609	(Died in Tower of London) 1666	Regicide of Charles I	Arundel	
Colonel	Thomas Wogan	1620	Last reported 1666 (Escaped to the Netherlands)	Regicide of Charles I	Cardigan	Governor of Aberystwyth Castle
	Gilbert Millington	c. 1598	(Died in prison in Jersey) 1666	Regicide of Charles I	Nottingham	
	William Say	1604	1666 (Escaped to Switzerland)	Regicide of Charles I	Camelford	
	Robert Wallop	1601	1667 (Life imprisonment)	Regicide of Charles I though did not sign	Andover	
	Francis Lascelles	1612	1667 (Forbidden to hold office again)	Regicide of Charles I though did not sign	Northallerton	
	William Cawley	1602	1667 (Escaped to Switzerland)	Regicide of Charles I	Midhurst	
Sir	Gilbert Pickering, 1st Baronet	1611	1668 (Banned from holding offices for life)	Regicide of Charles I though did not sign	Northamptonshire	Lord Chamberlain to Oliver Cromwell (1657)
	Thomas Lister (Regicide)	1597	1668 (Forbidden from holding office again)	Regicide of Charles I though did not sign	Lincolnshire	
Colonel	Thomas Waite		(Died in prison in Jersey) 1668 (Life Imprisonment)	Regicide of Charles I	Rutland	Governor of Burley-on-the-Hill High Sheriff of Rutland
	Daniel Blagrave	1603	1668 (Escaped to Germany)	Regicide of Charles I	Reading	Recorder of Reading from 1645 to 1656 and again from 1658
Lord	John Hewson	1620	1668 (Escaped to Amsterdam)	Regicide of Charles I	Guildford (1656–1658)	
	Henry Smith	1620	Last recorded 1668 (Died in prison on Jersey)	Regicide of Charles I	Leicestershire (1640–1653)	
	Augustine Skinner	c. 1594	1672 (died in Fleet Prison)	debtor	Kent (1642–1659)	
Major-General Sir	George Fleetwood	1623	(died in Tangiers, where transported) 1672	Regicide of Charles I	Buckingham	
The Viscount Monson	William Monson		c. 1672 (Believed died in Fleet Prison; Stripped of all honours and titles)	Regicide of Charles I though did not actually sign	Reigate	
Colonel	Edmund Harvey	c. 1601	1673 (Life imprisonment, died in Pendennis Castle)	Regicide of Charles I but did not sign, high treason	Great Bedwyn (1646–1648, 1659), Middlesex (1654–1655)	
	William Heveningham	1604	1678 (Imprisoned)	Regicide of Charles I though did not sign	Stockbridge	
Sir	Solomon Swale, 1st Baronet	1610	November 1678 (Died in King's Bench Prison)	Debtor	Aldborough (1660 – June 1678)	
Major-General	William Goffe	c. 1605	c. 1679 (escaped to New England where he died)	Regicide of Charles I	Great Yarmouth 1654, Hampshire 1656	
Colonel	James Temple	1606	1680 (Life imprisonment)	Regicide of Charles I	Bramber	
Sir	James Harrington, 3rd Baronet	1607	1680 (Exiled and stripped of Baronetcy for life)	Regicide of Charles I though did not sign	Middlesex	
Sir	Henry Marten	1602	1680 (Died prisoner in Chepstow Castle)	Regicide of Charles I	Berkshire (1640–1643 and 1646–1653)	
	Nicholas Love	1608	1682 (Escaped to Switzerland)	Regicide of Charles I though did not sign	Winchester	
Sir	Robert Tichborne	c. 1604	1682 (Died in the Tower of London)	Regicide of Charles I	City of London (1653)	Roundhead; Sheriff of London 1650, Lord Mayor of London 1656
Sir	Anthony Ashley-Cooper, 2nd Baronet	1621	1683 (died in exile in Amsterdam	High treason; evaded re-arrest and retrial after plot failures	Tewkesbury 1640, 1654; Wiltshire (1653–1659, 1660–1661), Poole (1654)	PC, Chancellor of the Exchequer (1661–1672), Lord Chancellor (1672–1673), Lord President of the Council (1679)
The Lord Russell	William Russell, Lord Russell	1639	1683 (Beheaded)	High treason and the Rye House Plot	Bedfordshire	PC, forerunner of the Whig Party
Colonel	Algernon Sidney	1623	1683 (Beheaded)	High treason and the Rye House Plot	Cardiff (1645–1653)	Lord Warden of the Cinque Ports (1648–1651)
	George Bowerman	c. 1646	1683 (died in Fleet Prison)	debtor	Bridport (1677–1679)	
Sir	Thomas Armstrong	1633	1684 (Beheaded)	High treason and the Rye House Plot	Stafford (1679–1681)	
Major-General	John Lambert	1619	1684 (died in prison on Drake's Island)	High treason as Roundhead leader	West Yorkshire (1654, 1656), Pontefract (1659)	
Sir	George Pudsey		1688 (died in Fleet Prison)	debtor	Oxford (1685-death)	Tory; Recorder of Oxford 1683-death
	John Dixwell	1607	1689 (Escaped to America)	Regicide of Charles I	Dover	
Sir	Robert Wright	c. 1634	1689 (died in Newgate Prison)	High treason and accepting bribes	King's Lynn 1668–1675	Chief Justice of the King's Bench (1687–1689)
Admiral of the Fleet The Baron Dartmouth	George Legge	c. 1647	1691 (died in the Tower)	Detained as Jacobite loyal to King James II	Ludgershall (1673–1679), Portsmouth (1679–1685)	PC, Governor of Portsmouth (1673–1682), Master-General of the Ordnance (1682–1688), Governor of Tangier (1683–1684), Constable of the Tower of London (1685–1688)
Lieutenant-General	Edmund Ludlow	1617	1692 (Surrendered then escaped – died in exile in Switzerland)	Regicide of Charles I	Wiltshire	Lord Deputy of Ireland (1659–1660)
	John Friend	c. 1641	1696 (Hanged at Tyburn)	High treason, implicated in Jacobite assassination plot against William III	Great Yarmouth (1685)	
Sir	John Fenwick, 3rd Baronet	1645	1697 (Beheaded)	High treason and for being a Jacobite	Northumberland	
	John Bennet	c. 1656	1712 (died in gaol)	debtor	Newton (1691–1695)	
	Edmund Dummer	1651	1713 (died in Fleet Prison)	debtor	Arundel (left Commons 1708)	Surveyor of the Navy (1692–1699)
Sir	Alexander Rigby	c. 1663	1717 (died in Fleet Prison)	debtor	Wigan (1701–1702)	High Sheriff of Lancashire 1690
Sir	Thomas Tipping, 1st Baronet	1653	1718 (died in prison in Southwark)	debtor	Oxfordshire (1685), Wallingford (1689–1690 and 1695–1701)	Whig to 1713, Tory since
	John Essington	1689	1729 (died at Newgate Prison)	debtor	New Romney (1727-death)	Whig; High Sheriff of Surrey 1724
Sir	Henry Goring, 4th Baronet	1679	1731 (died in exile in France)	Conspiracy in Atterbury Plot 1722	Horsham (1707–08 and January–June 1715) and Steyning (1709–1715)	Tory
	Abraham Blackmore	c. 1677	1732 (committed suicide in Fleet Prison)	debtor	Mitchell (1710–1713), Newton (1713–1715)	Tory
	George Robinson	before 1727	after 1732 (absconded, and expelled from Parliament)	fraud	Great Marlow (1731–1732)	
	Matthew Jenison	1654	1734 (died in Fleet Prison)	debtor	Newark (1701–1705)	
	William Beaw	c. 1676	1738 (died in Fleet Prison)	debtor	Mitchell (February–November 1701)	
	Thomas Forster	1683	1738 (died in exile in Boulogne, having escaped prison and been expelled by parliament)	Participating in 1715 Jacobite Rising	Northumberland (1708–1716)	Tory
	Anthony Hammond	1668	1738 (died in Fleet Prison)	debtor	Huntingdonshire (1695–1698), Cambridge University (1698–1702), Huntingdon borough (1702–1708), New Shoreham (1708)	Deputy Paymaster of the Forces 1711
Sir	Orlando Bridgeman, 2nd Baronet	1678	1746 (died in Gloucester gaol)	Debtor	Coventry (1707–1710), Calne (1715–1722), Lostwithiel (1724–1727), Bletchingley (1727–1734), Dunwich (1734–1738)	Governor of Barbados (1737–1738), Whig
Admiral	John Byng	1704	1757 (shot, after court martial, aboard HMS Monarch)	Cowardice and disaffection, in failing to prevent capture of Menorca by the French.	Rochester (1751-death)	Son of Viscount Torrington, hence Honourable; Commodore-Governor of Newfoundland (1742)
	George Pigot, 1st Baron Pigot	1718	1777 (died in detention near Fort St George, India)	Misconduct in office, corruption	Wallingford (1765–1768), Bridgnorth (1768-death)	Irish peer so could sit in Westminster; Governor of Madras (1775-death)
	Robert Paris Taylor	c. 1741	1792 (died in Fleet Prison)	debtor	Berwick-upon-Tweed (1768–1774)	Whig; Deputy Paymaster in Germany (1759–1763)
Lord	George Gordon	1751	1793 (died in Newgate Prison)	defamation	Ludgershall (1774–1780)	Son of Duke of Gordon hence Lord
Sir	William Congreve	1772	1828 (died in exile in France)	avoiding prosecution for business fraud (found guilty)	Gatton (1812–1818), Plymouth (1818-death)	KCH FRS: Tory
	Andrew Cochrane-Johnstone	1767	1833 (died in exile in France)	fled prosecution for Stock Exchange fraud	Stirling Burghs (1791–1797), Grampound (1807–1808 and 1812–1814)	Tory; Governor of Dominica 1797–1803
	John Mytton	1796	1834 (died in King's Bench Prison)	debtor	Shrewsbury (1819–1820)	Tory; Sheriff of Merionethshire 1821, Sheriff of Shropshire 1823, Mayor of Oswestry 1824
	Edward King, Viscount Kingsborough	1795	1837 (died of typhus in Sheriff's Prison, Dublin)	debtor	County Cork (1818–1826)	Son of 3rd Earl of Kingston, hence Viscount Kingsborough; Whig
	John Wharton	1765	1843 (died in Fleet Prison)	debtor	Beverley (1790–1796 and 1802–1826)	Whig
	Frederick Mullins (from 1841 De Moleyns)	1804	1854 (died in Fleet Prison)	Forgery of signature with intent to defraud bank	County Kerry (1831–1837)	Whig, later Liberal
	William John Bankes	1786	1855 (died in exile Venice)	avoiding prosecution for sodomy in 1841.	Truro (1810), Cambridge University (1822–1826), Marlborough (1829–1832), Dorset (1832–1835)	Conservative; FRS
	Pierce McCan	1882	1919 (Died of Spanish influenza in Gloucester Prison)	Uncharged but implicated in so-called "German Plot"	East Tipperary (1918–death but did not sit)	Sinn Féin; also Irish Teachta Dála but unable to sit.
	Terence Joseph McSwiney	1879	1920 (Died after hunger strike in Brixton Prison)	Possession of seditious articles and documents (in Irish republican cause)	Mid Cork (1918–death, though did not sit)	Sinn Féin; also Irish Teachta Dála; Lord Mayor of Cork 1920
	Harry Boland	1887	1922 (Died in hospital after wounding when arrested by Irish Free State Army)	Anti-Anglo-Irish Treaty IRA member	South Roscommon (1918–death but did not sit)	Sinn Féin; later Irish Teachta Dála
	Liam Mellows	1895	1922 (Executed by firing squad at Mountjoy Prison)	Reprisal during Irish Civil War	Galway East (1918–1922 but did not sit)	Sinn Féin; later Irish Teachta Dála
	Joseph MacDonagh	1883	1922 (Died after hunger strike in prison under Irish Free State)	Political – opponent of Anglo-Irish Treaty	Tipperary North (1918–1922 but did not sit)	Sinn Féin; also Irish Teachta Dála
	Seán Etchingham	1868	1923 (Died of sickness in prison under Irish Free State)	Political detainee during Irish Civil War	Wicklow East (1918–1922 but did not sit)	Sinn Féin; also Irish Teachta Dála and Secretary for Fisheries in Free State government.
	Bobby Sands	1954	5 May 1981 (Died after hunger strike in Maze Prison)	Unlawful possession of arms, membership of PIRA	Fermanagh and South Tyrone (9 April 1981-death, but unable to sit)	Anti H-Block

== See also ==
- Parliamentary records of the United Kingdom
- United Kingdom general election records
- United Kingdom by-election records
- Records of Prime Ministers of the United Kingdom
- List of military veterans in British politics
