= John St Aubyn (Parliamentarian) =

English politician

John St Aubyn (1613–1684) was an English politician who sat in the House of Commons of England in 1640. He served as a colonel in the parliamentary army in the English Civil War.

== Biography ==
St Aubyn was the eldest son of John St. Aubyn of Clowance, Cornwall and his wife Catherine Arundell, daughter of John Arundell of Trerice. He entered Middle Temple in 1631. In April 1640, St Aubyn was elected Member of Parliament (MP) for Tregoney. He became commissioner for assessment for Cornwall, commissioner for sequestrations and commissioner for levying of money in 1643. In 1644 for was commissioner for execution of ordinances and became High Sheriff of Cornwall to 1645. He became recorder of St Ives in 1646.

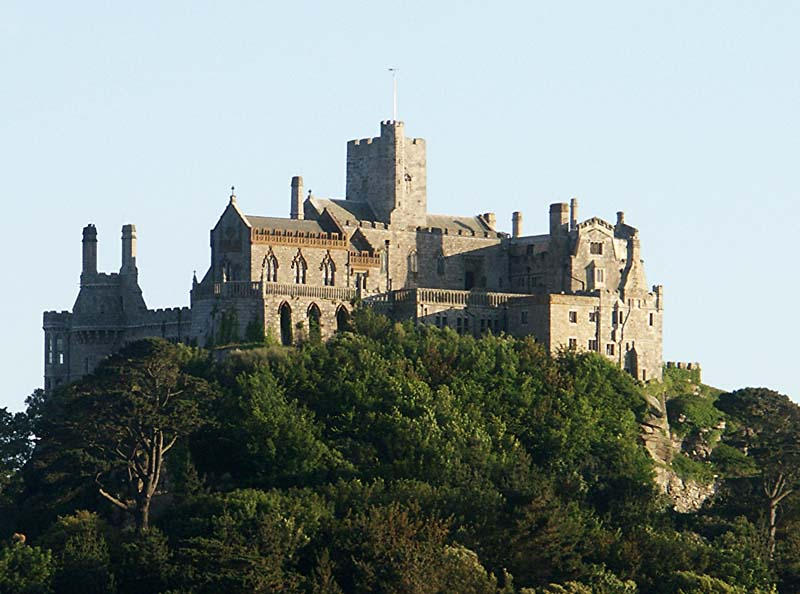
The Castle - St Michael's Mount

St Aubyn was a colonel in the parliamentary army and took part in the capture of St Michael's Mount in 1646. He was appointed Governor of the Mount in 1647 when it became a prison.

St Aubyn became freeman of Plymouth in 1648 and also commissioner for militia in Cornwall. In 1649 he became Vice-Admiral for South Cornwall and in 1650 he became a justice of the peace (JP) until 1653. He became a commissioner for security in 1655. In 1656 he was elected MP for Cornwall in the Second Protectorate Parliament. He was commissioner for assessment for Cornwall and became a JP again in 1657. He was commissioner for militia in Cornwall in 1659. In April 1659 he was elected MP for St Ives in the Third Protectorate Parliament. In 1659 he purchased St Michael's Mount from the Bassett family and it became his home. He was one of the Cornish gentry who met at Truro in December 1659 to demand a free parliament. He was commissioner for assessment for Cornwall again in January 1660 and commissioner for militia for Cornwall again in March 1660.

In April 1660 St Aubyn was re-elected MP for St Ives in the Convention Parliament in a double return. He became colonel of the militia in April 1660. He did not stand for parliament in 1661. He was stannator of Tywarnwhaile in 1663 and commissioner for assessment for Cornwall from 1663 to 1680. He was High Sheriff of Cornwall again in 1666.

St Aubyn married Catherine Godolphin, daughter of Francis Godolphin of Treveneage, and had six sons and four daughters. His son John was created baronet and MP for Mitchell.

Parliament of England
Vacant Parliament suspended since 1629	Member of Parliament for Tregoney; 1640; With: Sir John Arundell	Succeeded by Sir Richard Vyvyan; John Polwhele
Preceded by Anthony Rous; Anthony Nicholl; Thomas Silly; Richard Carter; Walter Moyle; Charles Boscawen; Thomas Gewen; James Launce	Member of Parliament for Cornwall; 1656; With: Anthony Nicholl; Thomas Silly; Richard Carter; Walter Moyle; William Braddon; Francis Rous	Succeeded by Hugh Boscawen; Francis Buller
Preceded by Not represented in Second Protectorate Parliament	Member of Parliament for St Ives; 1659; With: Peter Silly	Succeeded by John Feilder
Preceded by John Feilder	Member of Parliament for St Ives; 1660; With: James Praed; Edward Nosworthy	Succeeded by James Praed; Edward Nosworthy
