= Francis Rous =

English politician (c.1581–1659)

Francis Rous MP, JP
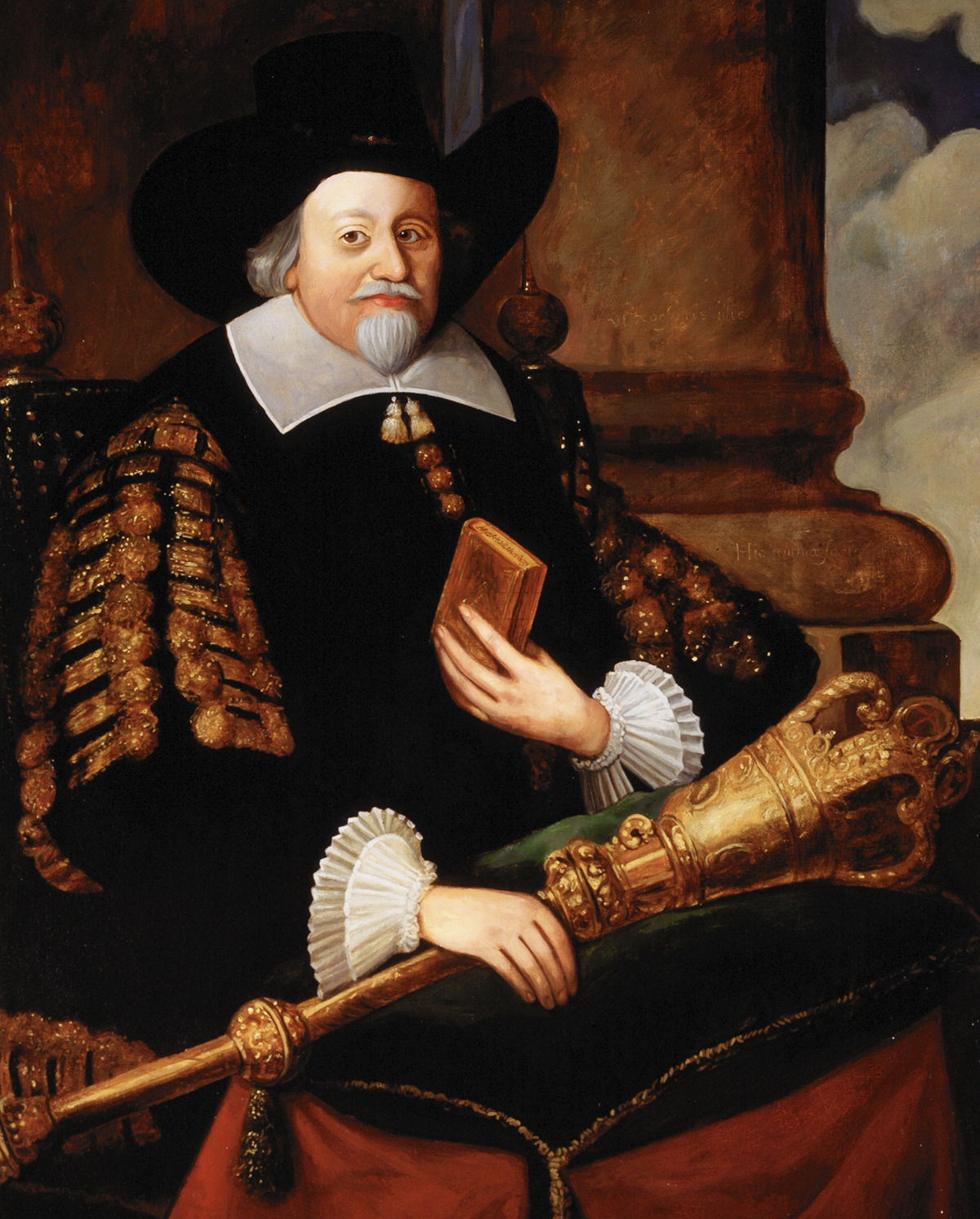
- Francis Rous

Member of Parliament for Cornwall
- In office 1656 – 1659 †

Member of Parliament for Truro 1626: 1640
- In office 1654–1655

Speaker of the House of Commons
- In office 1653–1653

Provost, Eton College
- In office 1644–1659

Member of Parliament for Tregony
- In office 1628–1629

Personal details
- Born: circa 1581 Dittisham, Devon
- Died: 7 January 1659 (aged 77) Acton
- Resting place: Eton College Chapel
- Spouse: Philippa (1619–1657)
- Children: Francis Rous (1615–1643)
- Parent(s): Sir Anthony Rous (c.1555–1620); Elizabeth Southcote (1547–1585)
- Relatives: John Pym (stepbrother)
- Education: Pembroke College, Oxford; Leiden University
- Occupation: Politician and theologian

Francis Rous, also spelled Rouse (c. 1581 to 1659), was an English politician and Puritan religious author, who was Provost of Eton from 1644 to 1659, and briefly Speaker of the House of Commons in 1653.

Stepbrother of Parliamentary leader John Pym, he joined him in opposing Arminianism in the Church of England, and played a leading role in the impeachment of Archbishop Laud. When the First English Civil War began in 1642, he supported the 1643 Solemn League and Covenant, and was appointed to the Westminster Assembly.

Under the Protectorate, he moved away from his Presbyterian colleagues, becoming closer to the religious Independents, and Oliver Cromwell. He died in January 1659, and was buried in Eton College Chapel.

== Biography ==
Francis Rous was born at Dittisham in Devon around 1581, fourth son of Sir Anthony Rous (ca 1555-1620), and his first wife, Elizabeth Southcote (1547–1585). His father remarried Philippa Colles (died 1620), mother of John Pym; his stepbrother became a close friend and political ally.

At some point after 1601, he married Philippa, 1575 to 1657; their son Francis, (1615–1643), became a distinguished classicist and doctor, but was disinherited by his father for marrying without his approval.

== Career ==
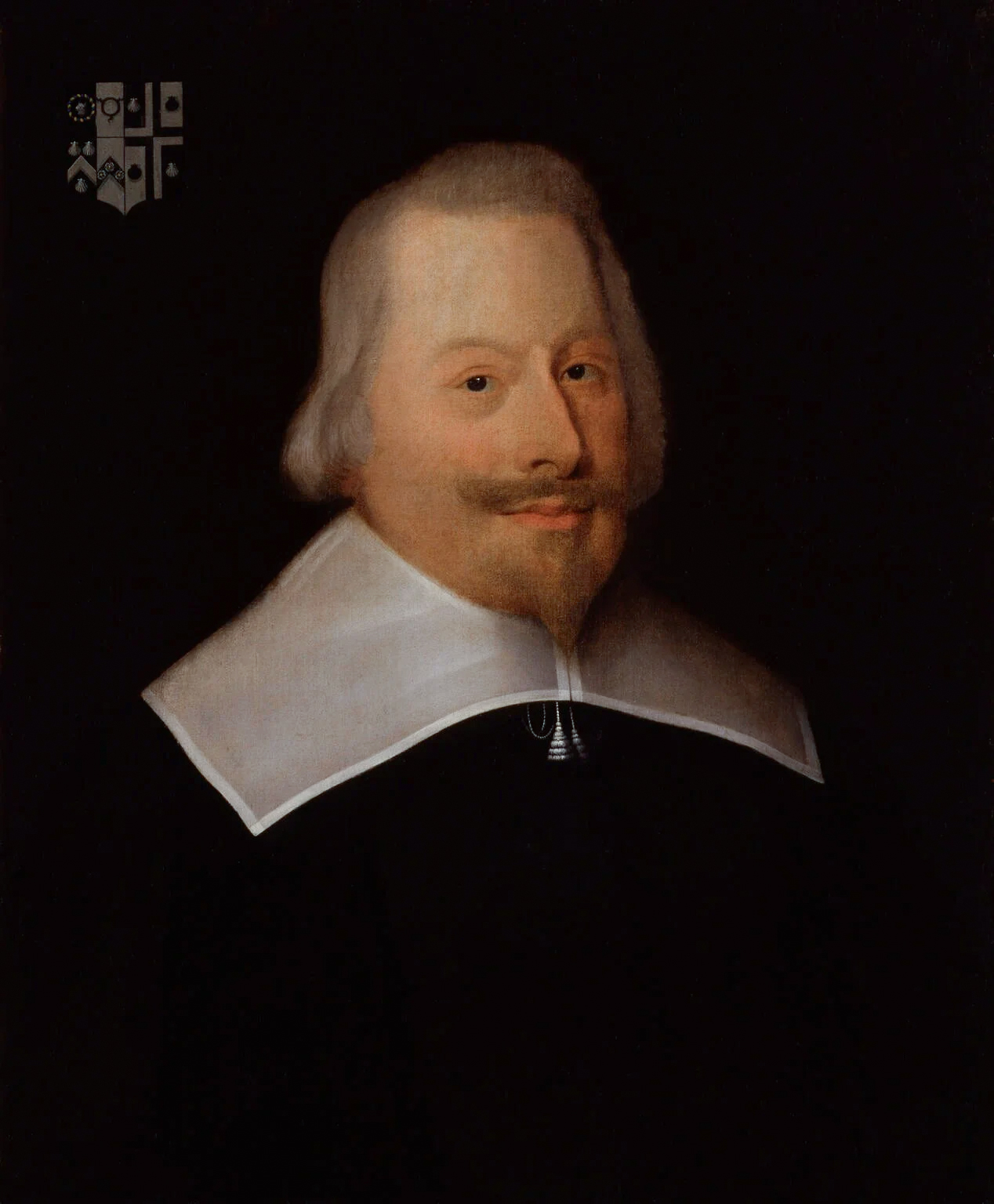
Rous' stepbrother and friend, John Pym

Sir Anthony Rous was a devout Puritan, who instilled the same values in his children. Francis was educated at Pembroke College, Oxford, then known as Broadgates, and known for its "advanced Protestantism". In 1598, he moved to the University of Leiden, an important centre of study for Scots and English Calvinists.

As legal training was then considered part of an education, he attended the Middle Temple for a short period in 1601, but moved to Landrake, in Cornwall. There are few details of his life prior to 1626, although he produced several books, and Rous claimed in 1641 that he spent some of 1609 travelling in Europe with Sir Thomas Overbury, victim in one of the most famous murder cases of the period.

Understanding individuals from this period requires an appreciation of the centrality of religious belief in daily life, and politics. With the exception of Independents, who opposed any state church, most people believed in a 'universal' church, where everyone belonged to the same structure, and used the same practices; where Charles I, William Laud, Rous and others disagreed was the form it took, particularly within the Church of England. It was taken for granted good government depended on 'true religion', and as many also believed the Second Coming was imminent, it gave debates on what that meant a real urgency and importance.

"Puritan" was a term for anyone who wanted to reform, or 'purify', the Church of England, the most prominent being Presbyterians. Most of these factions considered themselves part of the national church; those who were expelled by the 1662 Act of Uniformity became Nonconformists. Like John Pym, Rous was a passionate opponent of Arminianism; between 1619 and 1623, he published three works focusing on idolatry and 'carnal gloriations' among the priesthood.

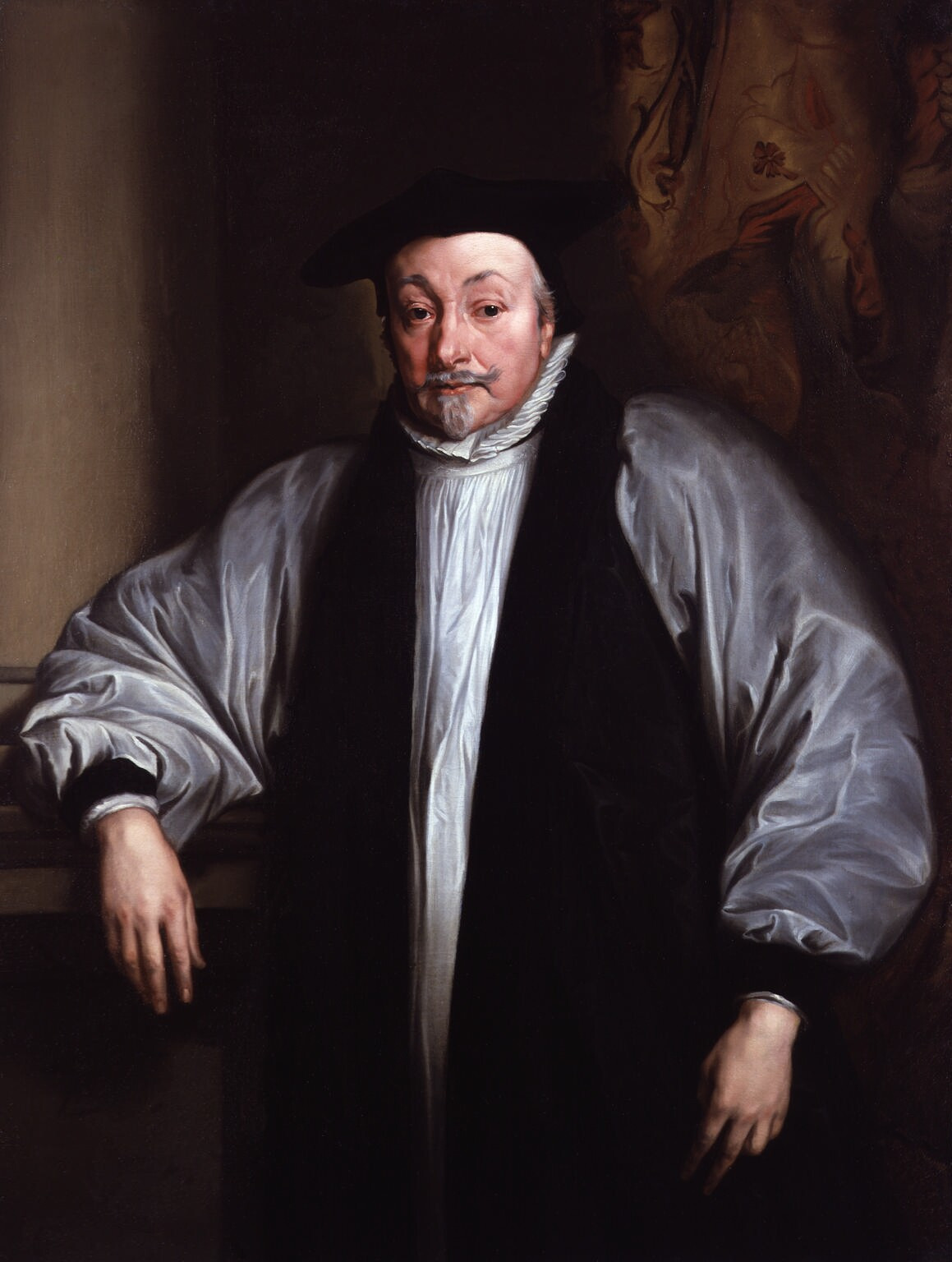
Rous was a fervent opponent of Archbishop Laud, executed in 1645

In 1626, he was elected Member of Parliament for Truro, then Tregony in 1628. Rous and Pym led the attack on Roger Maynwaring and Robert Sibthorpe, two clergymen who published sermons supporting divine right of kings, and passive obedience. Essentially political arguments, they were seen as undermining the role of Parliament, and condemned as such. In a speech made in January 1629, Rous argued if Arminianism continued to spread, 'true religion' was doomed; this inspired much of the subsequent opposition to Archbishop Laud. Charles responded by dissolving Parliament, initiating the period of Personal Rule that continued until 1640.

Returned for Truro in the elections of April and November 1640 Long Parliament, Rous opened the debate on the legality of Laud's reforms in December 1640, and presented articles of impeachment against John Cosin in 1641. He sat in the Westminster Assembly, took the Solemn League and Covenant, and in 1644, became Provost of Eton College, a position he retained until his death in 1659.

In 1643, Rous published his metrical paraphrases of the Book of Psalms, The Psalms of David set forth in English meeter, to be used in the Churches of England and Scotland. His text was heavily edited by a committee of translators, and in 1650 his Psalms were approved for use by the General Assembly of the Church of Scotland. Despite the extent of the revisions, Rous's text for Psalm 23 is generally considered to be the basis of the popular Christian hymn, "The Lord's my Shepherd".

After 1647, Rous moved closer to the Independents like Oliver Cromwell, and supported Charles' execution in 1649; since Presbyterians believed a 'well-ordered' monarchy was divinely mandated, The Protectorate presented a problem. In April 1649, he published a pamphlet titled The Lawfulness of Obeying the Present Government; claiming to be written by a 'true Presbyterian', this argued scripture required obedience to authority, regardless of who wielded it.

In early 1652, he served on the Committee for Propagation of the Gospel; led by Congregationalist minister John Owen, Parliament was dissolved before any of its suggested reforms were enacted. He was appointed Speaker of the House of Commons in 1653, although he proved incapable of managing the violent factionalism of Barebone's Parliament. Along with Charles Worsley and John Lambert, Rous was increasingly disturbed by the radicalism of many MPs. In a pre-planned move, on the morning of 12 December 1653, he led moderate members to Cromwell's office, where they resigned 'their powers unto his Excellency', effectively dissolving Parliament.

He was MP for Cornwall in 1656, along with Pym's nephew, Anthony Nicholl, but rejected a seat in the newly created Upper House. His wife Philippa was terminally ill, and died in December 1657; Rous followed in January 1659. His will left £50 to his grandson, 'so long as he shall be in preparation towards a profession', and funded three scholarships for Etonians to attend Pembroke College. He was buried in Eton College Chapel.

== Bibliography; significant works ==
- 1616; Meditations of Instruction, of Exhortation, of Reprofe: indeavouring the Edification and Reparation of the House of God
- 1619; The Arte of Happines, consisting of three Parts, whereof the first searcheth out the Happinesse of Man, the second particularly discovers and approves it, the third sheweth the Meanes to attayne and increase it;
- 1622; Diseases of the Time attended by their Remedies;
- 1623; Oyl of Scorpions;
- 1626; Testis Veritatis; a reply to Richard Montagu's Appello Caesarem;
- 1641; Catholicke Charity; originally written in response to a 1630 work of the Catholic Tobie Matthew, but could not be printed in the Laudian 1630s.
- 1643; The Psalmes of David in English Meeter; used by the Church of Scotland until mid 19th century;
- 1649; The Lawfulness of Obeying the Present Government;

== Sources ==
- Bremer, Francis; Webster, Tom (2006). Puritans and Puritanism in Europe and America. ABC-CLIO. ISBN 978-1576076781.
- Burrow, Colin (2008). "Rous, Francis". Oxford Dictionary of National Biography (online ed.). Oxford University Press. doi:10.1093/ref:odnb/24171. (Subscription, Wikipedia Library access or UK public library membership required.)
- Chisholm, Hugh, ed. (1911). "Rous, Francis" . Encyclopædia Britannica. Vol. 23 (11th ed.). Cambridge University Press. p. 774.
- Hunneyball, Paul (2010). ROUS, Francis (1581-1659), of Landrake, Cornw.; later of Brixham, Devon, Eton, Bucks. and Acton, Mdx; in The History of Parliament: the House of Commons 1604-1629. CUP. ISBN 978-1107002258.
- Lamport, Mark A.; Forrest, Benjamin K. (2019). Hymns and Hymnody: Historical and Theological Introductions, Volume 2: From Catholic Europe to Protestant Europe. Wipf and Stock Publishers. ISBN 978-1-5326-5127-4.
- Little, Patrick (2008). Oliver Cromwell: New Perspectives. Palgrave Macmillan. ISBN 9781137018854.
- Macleod, Donald (Autumn 2009). "The influence of Calvinism on politics" (PDF). Theology in Scotland. XVI (2).
- McGee, Sears J (2004). "Francis Rous and "scabby or itchy children": The Problem of Toleration in 1645". Huntington Library Quarterly. 67 (3): 401–422. JSTOR 10.1525/hlq.2004.67.3.401.
- Petersen, Randy (2014). Be Still, My Soul: The Inspiring Stories behind 175 of the Most-Loved Hymns. Tyndale House Publishers, Inc. ISBN 978-1-4143-8842-7.
- Prögler, Daniela (2013). English Students at Leiden University, 1575-1650. Routledge. ISBN 978-1409437123.
- Royle, Trevor (2004). Civil War: The Wars of the Three Kingdoms 1638–1660 (2006 ed.). Abacus. ISBN 978-0-349-11564-1.
- Sharpe, Kevin (2000). Remapping Early Modern England: The Culture of Seventeenth-Century Politics. Cambridge University Press. ISBN 978-0521662932.
- Wedgwood, CV (1955). The King's Peace, 1637-1641 (1983 ed.). Penguin Classics. ISBN 978-0140069907.

Political offices
Preceded by William Lenthall	Speaker of the House of Commons; 1653	Succeeded by William Lenthall
Parliament of England
Preceded by William Rous; Henry Rolle	Member of Parliament for Truro; 1626; With: Henry Rolle	Succeeded by Henry Rolle; Richard Daniel
Preceded by Thomas Carey; Sir Robert Killigrew	Member of Parliament for Tregony; 1628–1629	Parliament suspended until 1640
Vacant Parliament suspended since 1629	Member of Parliament for Truro; 1640–1653; With: John Rolle 1640–1648	Not represented in Barebones Parliament
Vacant Not represented in Rump Parliament	Member of Parliament for Devon; 1653; With: George Monck; John Carew; Christopher Martyn; James Erisey; Richard Sweet	Succeeded by Thomas Saunders; Robert Rolle; Arthur Upton; Thomas Reynell; William Morice; John Hale; William Bastard; William Fry; Sir John Northcote, Bt; Henry Hatsell
Vacant Not represented in Barebones Parliament	Member of Parliament for Truro; 1654	Succeeded by Walter Vincent
Preceded by Anthony Rous; Anthony Nicholl; Thomas Silly; Richard Carter; Walter Moyle; Charles Boscawen; Thomas Gewen; James Launce	Member of Parliament for Cornwall; 1656; With: Anthony Nicholl; Thomas Silly; Richard Carter; Walter Moyle; William Braddon; John St Aubyn	Succeeded by Hugh Boscawen; Francis Buller
Academic offices
Preceded by Richard Steward	Provost of Eton; 1644–1659	Succeeded by Nicholas Lockyer
