= Richard Carew (antiquary) =

Cornish translator and antiquary (1555-1620)

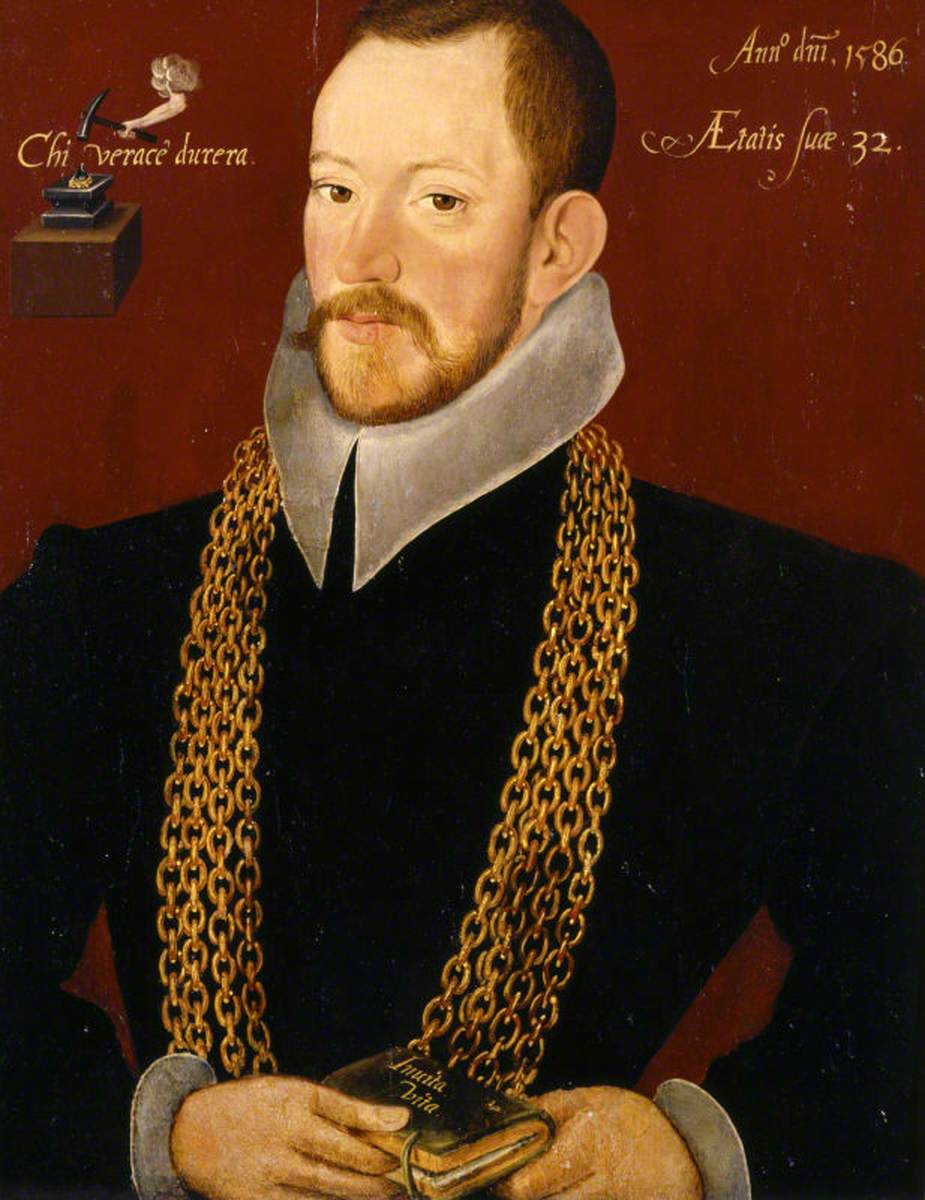
- Richard Carew, High Sheriff and Deputy-Lieutenant of Cornwall, in 1586

Member of Parliament for Saltash
- In office 1584

High Sheriff of Cornwall
- In office 1583; 1586

Personal details
- Born: 17 July 1555 Antony, Cornwall, England
- Died: 6 November 1620 (aged 65)
- Spouse: Juliana Arundell
- Children: 1+, including Richard
- Parent: Thomas Carew (father)
- Relatives: George Carew (brother); Richard Carew (grandson); John Carew (grandson)
- Education: Christ Church, Oxford
- Occupation: Translator

Richard Carew (17 July 1555 – 6 November 1620) was a Cornish translator and antiquary. He is best known for his county history, Survey of Cornwall (1602).

== Life ==
Carew belonged to a prominent gentry family, and was the eldest son of Thomas Carew: he was born on 17 July 1555 at East Antony, Cornwall. He was educated at Christ Church, Oxford, where he was a contemporary of Sir Philip Sidney and William Camden, and then at the Middle Temple. He made a translation of the first five cantos of Tasso's Jerusalem Delivered (1594), which was more correct than that of Edward Fairfax. He also translated Juan de la Huarte's Examen de Ingenios, basing his translation on Camillo Camilli's Italian version. (This book is the first systematic attempt to relate physiology with psychology, though based on the medicine of Galen.)

Carew was a member of the Elizabethan Society of Antiquaries, and is particularly known for his Survey of Cornwall (1602), the second English county history to appear in print. Later editions were published in 1723, 1769 and 1811, and Davies Gilbert published an index in his Cornwall, vol. 4, pp. 381–92. He also published an Epistle concerning the Excellencies of the English Tongue (1605).

Carew served as High Sheriff of Cornwall (1583 and 1586), and as MP for Saltash in 1584. He was married to Juliana Arundell, the eldest daughter of Sir John Arundell of Trerice; their son Richard Carew was created a baronet in 1641 (see Carew baronets).

Carew died on 6 November 1620 and was buried in Antony church on 7 November.

== Selected publications ==
- Survey of Cornwall, 1769 edition
- The Survey of Cornwall, by Richard Carew of Antony; ed. with an introduction by F. E. Halliday. London: Andrew Melrose, 1953; reissued in 1969 by Adams & Dart, London ISBN 0-238-78941-1 (includes an informative introduction, pp. 15–73, four minor works of Carew, and Norden's maps)
- The Survey of Cornwall 1602; Tamar Books, 2000 ISBN 0-85025-389-6
- The Survey of Cornwall; J. Chynoweth, N. Orme & A. Walsham, eds. (Devon and Cornwall Record Society. New series; 47.) Exeter: D. C. R. S, 2004 (introduction, ca. 50 p.; facsimile reproduction, originally published:- London: John Jaggard, 1602, 168 ff.)

== Notes ==
Honorary titles
Preceded by The Earl of Bedford	Lord Lieutenant of Cornwall jointly with Sir Francis Godolphin, Sir William Mohun, and Peter Edgcumbe; 1586–1587	Succeeded by Sir Walter Raleigh
