= John Moyle (politician) =

Cornish gentleman and politician

John Moyle (1592?–1661) was a Cornish gentleman, known as a High Sheriff of Cornwall, friend of Sir John Eliot and supporter of the Parliamentarian cause in the Long Parliament.

== Life ==
He was son of Robert Moyle of Bake in St. Germans, Cornwall (buried 9 May 1604), by his wife Anne, daughter of Henry Lock of Acton, Middlesex (buried 12 April 1604). He matriculated at Exeter College, Oxford, on 10 June 1608, aged 16. Among his contemporaries at Exeter was John Eliot, to whose father Moyle on one occasion told something about of his son's extravagance. Eliot found out, went to Moyle's house to express his resentment, and in a fit of passion drew his sword and wounded Moyle in the side. This act was unpremeditated, and Eliot expressed regret for what he had done. Moyle and Eliot became friends.

Moyle was sheriff in Cornwall in 1624. To fill a vacancy in the Long Parliament, he was returned for the Cornish borough of East Looe in 1647/8. He died at Bake on 9 October 1661, and was buried at St. Germans on 17 October.

Some of Moyle's correspondence with Sir John Eliot is quoted in Alexander Balloch Grosart's edition of his Letter-book, pp. 109–10, 143–8, and in John Forster's Eliot, ii. 630–2. Papers relating to him are in British Library Add MSS 5494, f. 79 and 5497, f. 162.

== Family ==
In 1612 he married Admonition, daughter of Edmond Prideaux of Netherton, Devon, who was buried at St. Germans on 3 December 1675. Of his numerous sons, Sir Walter Moyle of Bake (1627–1701) was knighted at Whitehall 4 February 1663, was High Sheriff of Cornwall for 1671, and was father of Walter Moyle the political writer.

== Notes ==
Attribution

This article incorporates text from a publication now in the public domain: Courtney, William Prideaux (1894). "Moyle, John (1592-1661)". In Lee, Sidney (ed.). Dictionary of National Biography. Vol. 39. London: Smith, Elder & Co.
