= St Tudy =

Village in Cornwall, England

Coordinates: 50.555°N 4.731°W

St Tudy: Cornish: Eglostudik
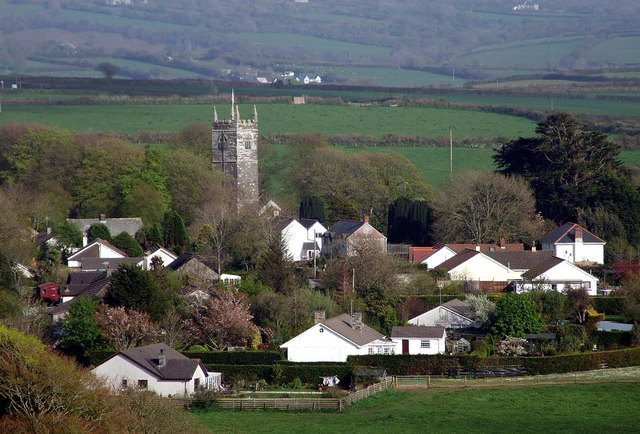
- St Tudy

- Location within Cornwall
- Population: 604 (2011 census)
- OS grid reference: SX06557641
- Unitary authority: Cornwall
- Ceremonial county: Cornwall
- Region: South West
- Country: England
- Sovereign state: United Kingdom
- Post town: BODMIN
- Postcode district: PL30
- Dialling code: 01208
- Police: Devon and Cornwall
- Fire: Cornwall
- Ambulance: South Western
- UK Parliament: North Cornwall
- Councillors: Stephen Rushworth (C, St Issey and St Tudy)
- Website: www.sttudy.co.uk

St Tudy (Cornish: Eglostudik) is a village and civil parish in north Cornwall, England. The village is situated in the River Camel valley approximately five miles northeast of Wadebridge.

== History ==
The village is mentioned as having a cattle fair in Owen's book of fairs 1788.

During World War II, the US Army 60th Engineer Combat Battalion, part of the 35th Infantry Division were based at St Tudy prior to leaving for the Normandy landings via Southampton Docks.

== Notable houses ==
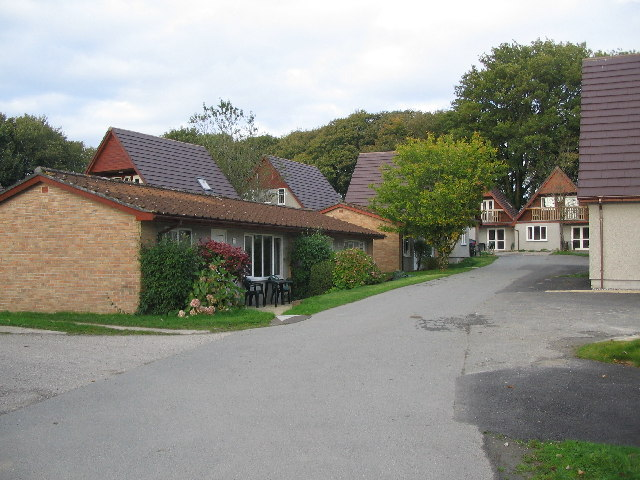
Hengar

There was formerly a manor house at Tinten and the chapel may still be recognised. It has been reused as a barn and has a 15th-century window. Other small former manor houses in the parish are Hengar, which was destroyed by a fire in 1904 (in 1906 it was rebuilt in Elizabethan style); Lamellen, Tremeer and Wetherham Lamellen has a garden with some very large rhododendrons and cryptomerias. Between 1941 and 1962 the garden became very overgrown but after 1962 a programme of reclamation began. The garden is full of plants such as Stewartia pseudocamellia, Magnolia campbellii and Rhododendron malayanum.

Another notable garden is the garden of Tremeer which is full of rhododendrons and camellias. There are fifty colourful, evergreen Kurume hybrid azaleas sent to Cornwall from Yokohama and planted in the lawn by Major General Eric Harrison. Behind the house is a plantation of camellia varieties. Harrison has produced several varieties of rhododendron from Rhododendron impeditum and R. augustinii; these were given local names 'St Tudy', 'St Breward', 'St Merryn' and 'St Minver' (all named after local saints). The paths through the rhododendrons lead to a pond at the far end of the garden. Other notable plants in the garden are a Camellia 'Donation' and a Magnolia x veitchii.

One of the most well-known of Thomas Rowlandson's paintings is "Hengar House the seat of Matthw [sic] Mitchell Esqr., Cornwall" (1812) which was sold at the Sir Richard Onslow sale, Sotheby's, 15 July 1959. Hengar was a country seat of the Onslows.

== Parish church ==
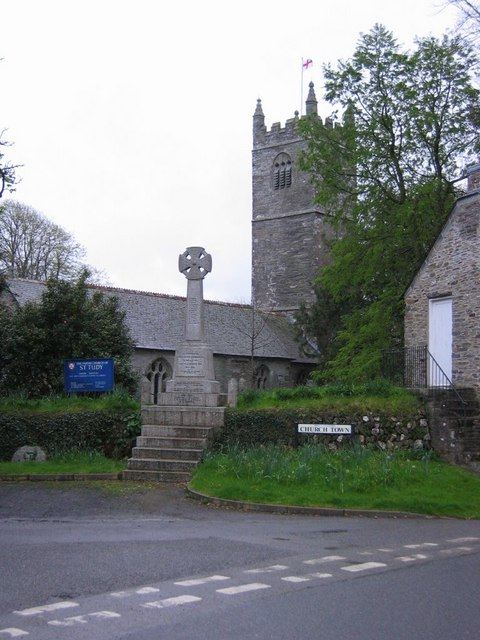
St Tudy Church and War Memorial

The parish church is dedicated to St Tudius and was restored in 1873. There was a Norman church here but the present structure is of the Perpendicular period. There are two aisles, the arcades of which are identical. The tower has three stages, is 64 feet high, and is topped with battlements and pinnacles; there are six bells. It is Grade I listed. Anthony Nicholl (died 1658) is commemorated by a sumptuous memorial erected by his wife. In the churchyard is a pre-Norman coped stone with carving, possibly a rare hogback tomb.

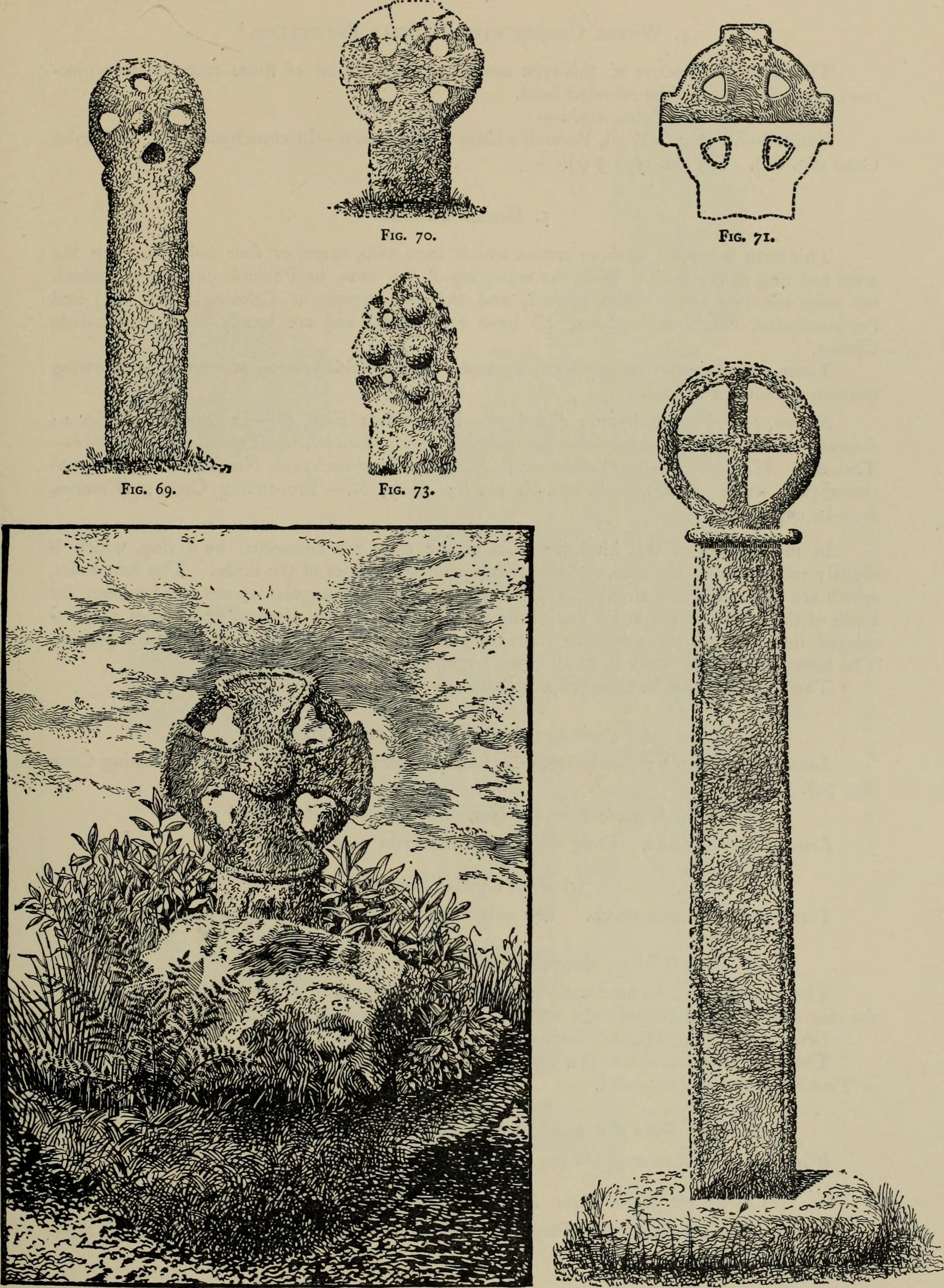
Trevenning Cross (fig. 70) illustrated in The Victoria History of the County of Cornwall (1906)

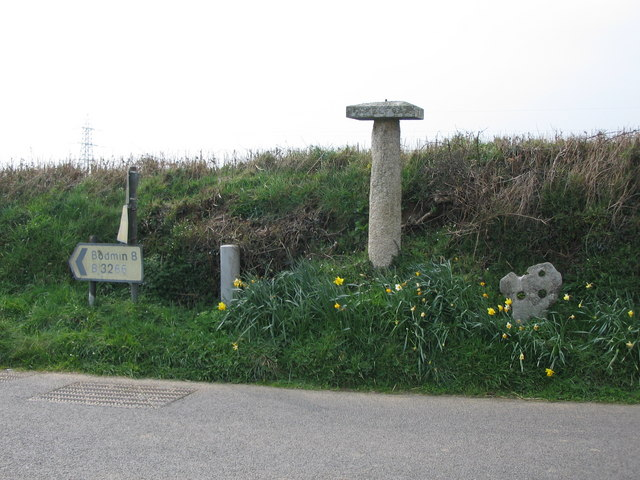
Trevenning Cross

Trevenning Cross is at a road junction about one and a half miles northeast of the churchtown. It was found in the hedge close to its present position by J. R. Collins of Bodmin.

The bell-ringers of the village are celebrated in the song The Ringers of Egloshayle (Roud 1163).

A soldier returning to St Tudy from World War I is reported to have planted a conker collected from Flanders near the church.

== Notable people ==
Notable people from St Tudy include: William Bligh (1754–1817), naval officer; Eddie George (1938–2009), former governor of the Bank of England; Oscar Kempthorne (1919–2000), statistician and geneticist at Iowa State University; Richard Lower (c.1631–1691), an early experimenter in blood transfusion; Humphrey Nicholls (1577–1643); MP for Bodmin; and Vice Admiral Sir Louis Le Bailly (1915–2010), who led a campaign for the local pub to be renamed after William Bligh. Major-General Eric Harrison (1893–1987), served in both world wars; he was a rugby player, Olympic athlete, and later a painter; in retirement he lived at Tremeer.

Edward Byllynge (died 1687) was a colonial administrator and governor of West New Jersey from 1680, until his death in England. Byllynge owned a large section of land in New Jersey with the Quakers. He was born at Hengar.

== Cornish wrestling ==
Cornish wrestling tournaments, for prizes, were held at Hengar Manor in the 1800s.
