= Sir Richard Carew, 1st Baronet =

British writer and Member of Parliament

Member of Parliament for Mitchell
- In office 1621-1622

Member of Parliament for Cornwall
- In office 1614

Personal details
- Born: ca. 1580
- Died: 14 March 1643 (aged 62–63)
- Spouse(s): Bridget Chudleigh; Miss Rolle
- Children: Sir Alexander Carew, 2nd Baronet; 4 Daughters; John Carew; Thomas Carew
- Parent: Richard Carew (father)
- Relatives: Sir John Carew, 3rd Baronet (grandson)
- Education: Oxford University

Arms of Carew: Or, 3 lions passant in pale sable These were the arms shown on the seal of "Nicholas de Carreu" (c.1255–1311), appended to the Barons' Letter, 1301, which he joined as "Lord of Mulesford" and which were blazoned for the same bearer in the Caerlaverock Poem or Roll of Arms of 1300, when he was present at the Siege of Caerlaverock Castle. From him were descended the Carew baronets of Antony and of Haccombe

Sir Richard Carew, 1st Baronet (ca. 1580 – 14 March 1643), of Antony in Cornwall, was an English writer and Member of Parliament.

== Life ==
Carew was the eldest son of the antiquary Richard Carew (1555–1620). He was educated at Oxford, probably at Merton, and studied law at the Middle Temple. He also visited the courts of Poland, Sweden and France, the first two as part of an embassy led by his uncle and the last in attendance on the ambassador, Sir Henry Nevill. He entered Parliament in 1614 as member for Cornwall, and subsequently also represented Mitchell in 1621–2.

Carew published several works, including a treatise written to prove that "a warming stone" was "useful and comfortable for the colds of aged and sick people". His most notable work, however, was the True and readie Way to learne the Latine Tongue, attested by three excellently learned and approved authours of three nations, of which he was the English author. This was not published until 1654, well after his death, and apparently only made its way into print on the misapprehension that it was his more distinguished father who had penned it. The work argues for learning by translating back and forth, with a minimal amount of grammar teaching.

On 9 August 1641, Richard Carew was created a baronet. He died less than two years later.

== Family ==
He had married twice: first, during his father's lifetime, to Bridget Chudleigh, by whom he had one son, Alexander (who succeeded to the baronetcy), and four daughters. After her death he married again, to a Miss Rolle, and they had at least two other sons, John and Thomas.

The Civil War divided the family, and proved particularly fateful for them, for two years after Sir Richard's death Sir Alexander was executed on Tower Hill for treason as a Royalist, while John as a loyal Parliamentarian sat on the court that condemned King Charles and was eventually hanged, drawn and quartered as a regicide at the Restoration.

== Notes ==
Parliament of England
Preceded by Sir Anthony Rous; Sir William Godolphin	Member of Parliament for Cornwall; 1614; With: John St Aubyn	Succeeded by Bevil Grenville; John Arundell
Preceded by Christopher Hodson; Walter Hickman	Member of Parliament for Mitchell; 1621–1622; With: Richard Thelwall	Succeeded by John Holles; John Sawle
Baronetage of England
New creation	Baronet (of Antony); 1641–1643	Succeeded by Alexander Carew
