= Walter Moyle (MP) =

English politician

Sir Walter Moyle (9 March 1627 – 19 September 1701) was an English politician who sat in the House of Commons at various times between 1656 and 1660.

Moyle was the son of John Moyle of Bake, Cornwall. He was educated at Exeter College, Oxford and at Inner Temple.

In 1654, Moyle was elected Member of Parliament for Cornwall in the First Protectorate Parliament and was re-elected in 1656 for the Second Protectorate Parliament. In 1659 he was elected MP for Lostwithiel in the Third Protectorate Parliament.

In 1660, Moyle was elected MP for Lostwithiel in the Convention Parliament. He was knighted at Whitehall on 4 February 1664.

Moyle died in 1701 at the age of 74.

Moyle married Thomasine Morice, daughter of Sir William Morice, the Secretary of State. His son Walter was a political writer.

Parliament of England
Preceded by Robert Bennet; Francis Langdon; Anthony Rous; John Bawden	Member of Parliament for Cornwall; 1654 – 1656; With: Charles Boscawen 1654; Thomas Gewen 1654; James Launce 1654; Anthony Rous 1654–1656; Thomas Ceely 1654–1656; Richard Carter 1654-166; Anthony Nicholl 1654–1656; Anthony Rous 1656; William Braddon 1656; John St Aubin 1656	Succeeded by Hugh Boscawen; Francis Buller
Preceded by Not represented in Second Protectorate Parliament	Member of Parliament for Lostwithiel; 1659; With: John Clayton	Succeeded by Not represented in restored Rump
