= Sir Alexander Carew, 2nd Baronet =

English landowner, soldier, and politician (1608–1644)

Sir Alexander Carew MP, JP
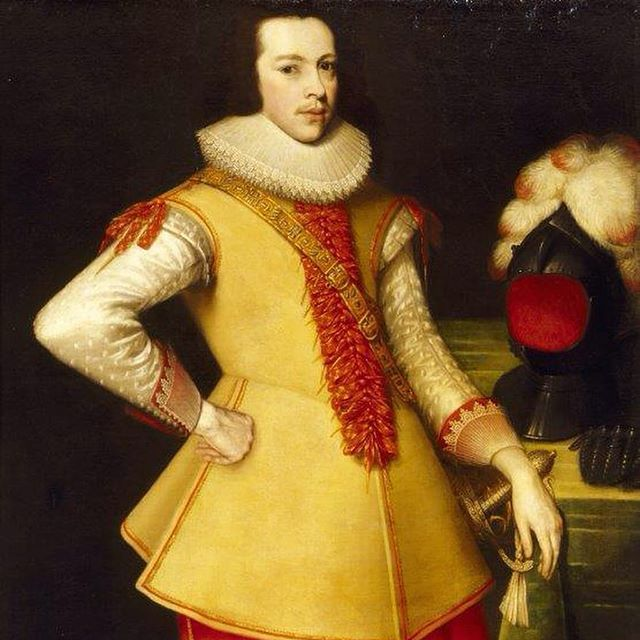
- Sir Alexander Carew

Governor of St Nicholas' Island, Plymouth
- In office 1642 – August 1643

Member of Parliament for Cornwall
- In office November 1640 – September 1643 (suspended)

Personal details
- Born: 30 August 1609 Antony, Cornwall
- Died: 23 December 1644 (aged 35) Tower Hill
- Cause of death: Executed for treason
- Resting place: St Augustine's, Hackney
- Spouse: Jane Rolle (1606–1679)
- Relations: John Carew; James Chudleigh;
- Children: Sir John Carew, 3rd Baronet; Richard (1641-1691); Joan (?-1716); Mary; Bridget
- Parent(s): Bridget Chudleigh (ca 1584–1612); Sir Richard Carew, 1st Baronet (1580–1643)
- Occupation: Landowner, soldier and politician

Military service
- Allegiance: England
- Battles/wars: First English Civil War

Sir Alexander Carew (30 August 1608 – 23 December 1644) was an English landowner, soldier and politician from Antony, Cornwall. Elected Member of Parliament for Cornwall in November 1640, he voted for the execution of the Earl of Strafford in May 1641, and supported the removal of bishops from the Church of England.

When the First English Civil War began in August 1642, he was one of the relatively few members of the Cornish gentry who backed Parliament. In March 1643, he was appointed commander of St Nicholas' Island, a key defensive position for Plymouth. He was arrested in August, after attempting to switch sides and handing over the island to the Royalists, and was taken to London.

In a demonstration of Parliament's commitment to winning the war, he was executed for treason in December 1644, followed in January by Sir John Hotham, his son John Hotham the younger, and Archbishop Laud. His half-brother, John Carew, was executed as a regicide in October 1660.

== Personal details ==
Alexander Carew was born on 30 August 1608, the eldest surviving son of Sir Richard Carew, 1st Baronet (c. 1580–1643), and his first wife, Bridget Chudleigh (ca 1584–1612). In 1621, Sir Richard remarried, this time to Grace Rolle (1606–1655); their four sons included John Carew, who signed the death warrant for Charles I, and was executed for treason, in October 1660. Richard Carew was a moderate Puritan, who was more interested in education, inventions, and breeding cats; in August 1641, he purchased a baronetcy, a method used by Charles I to raise money.

In 1631, Alexander married Jane Rolle (1606–1679); they had five children who lived to adulthood, Bridget, Mary, Joan, John, and Richard.

== Career ==
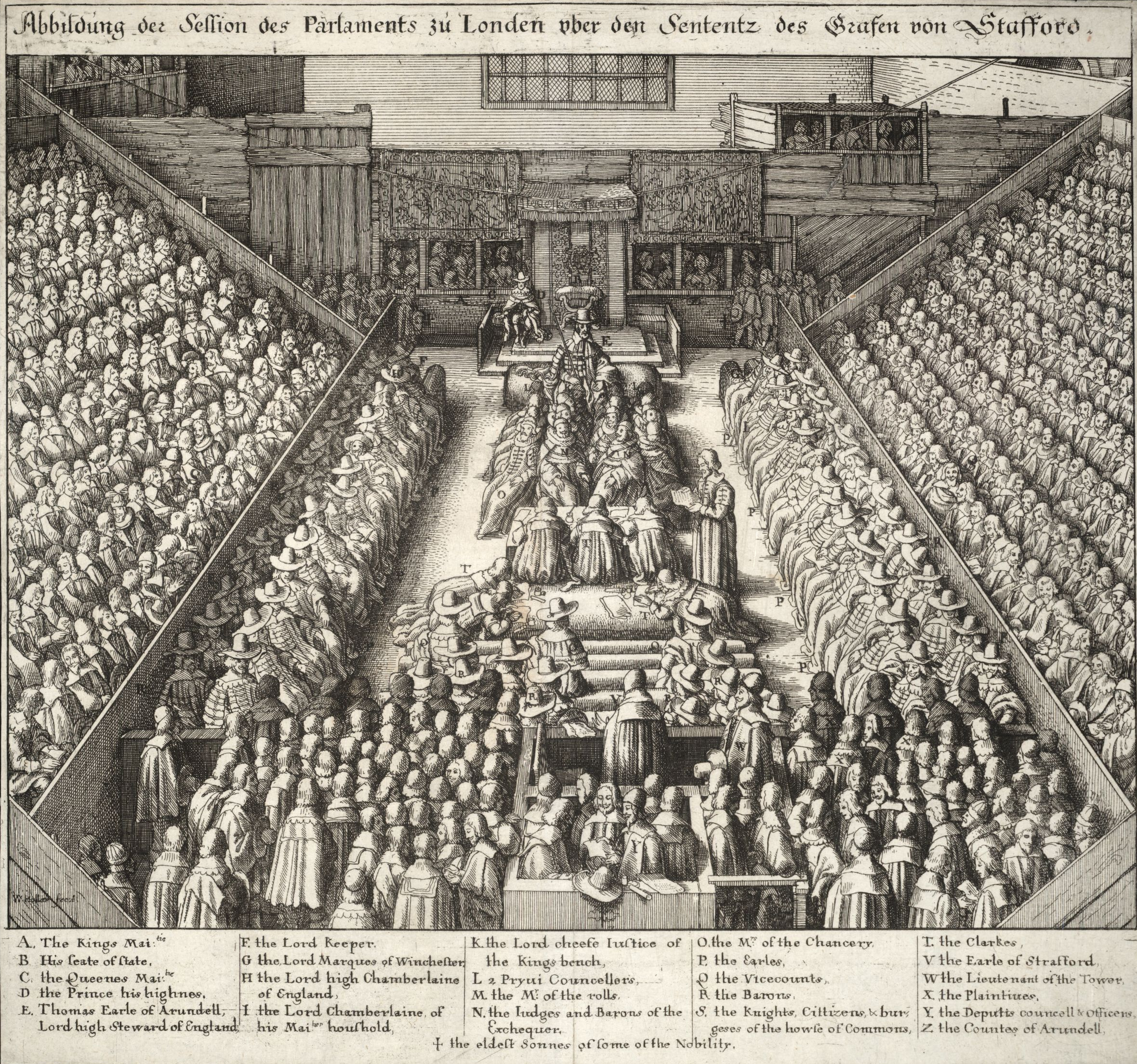
Trial of the Earl of Strafford, May 1641; Carew voted for his execution

Although there is no record of which university he attended, in 1628 Carew entered the Middle Temple to acquire legal training, then considered part of a gentleman's education. Like his father and grandfather before him, in November 1640 Carew was elected Member of Parliament for Cornwall. He supported the removal of bishops from the Church of England, and voted for the execution of the Earl of Strafford in May 1641. He reportedly claimed "If I were sure to be the next man, that should suffer upon the same scaffold, with the same axe, I would give my consent."

When the First English Civil War began in August 1642, Carew was one of the relatively few members of the Cornish gentry who openly supported Parliament, and was appointed to numerous committees as a result. After succeeding his father in March 1643, he was made a member of the Cornish Sequestration Committee, and commander of St Nicholas' Island, a key defensive position for Plymouth. Many went to war in 1642 expecting a single, decisive battle; by 1643, it was clear this was incorrect, and Parliamentarians like Carew whose estates lay in occupied territory faced financial ruin.

The summer of 1643 was the highpoint of Royalist success, and by August they controlled the entire West Country with the exception of Plymouth and Exeter. Carew's cousin James Chudleigh, leader of Parliamentarian forces in Devon, switched sides after being captured at Stratton in May, and he himself now opened negotiations to do the same. In August, he ordered his men to open fire on a Parliamentarian warship entering harbour; they refused, and he allegedly escaped lynching only after the ship's captain intervened on his behalf.

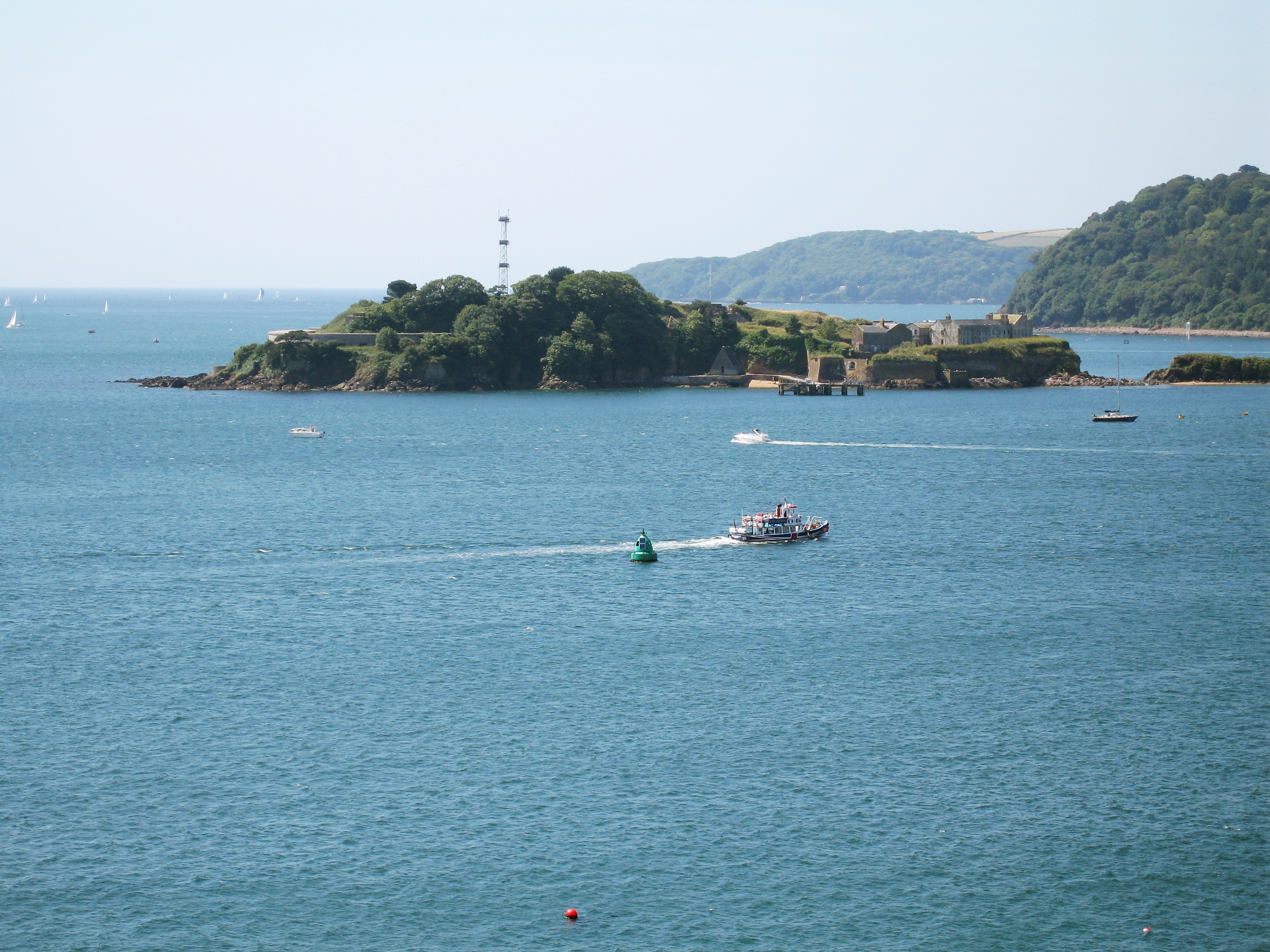
St Nicholas' Island, Plymouth, now Drakes Island

Accused of treason, Carew was held in the Tower of London, and expelled from Parliament. As the war grew more bitter, both sides began using martial law to prosecute senior officers who had defected. In August 1644, Parliament established a military tribunal to try those suspected of treachery; in November, Carew was sentenced to death, along with the former commander of Hull, Sir John Hotham, and his son. These sentences were supported by those like Oliver Cromwell, who felt the war risked being lost due to lack of commitment.

His wife petitioned Parliament, who dismissed her claim that he was "in a kind of distracted condition and unfit to die", but gave him a month to arrange his affairs. He was executed on Tower Hill in December 1644, followed in January by the Hothams, and Archbishop Laud; held since 1641, it was widely believed he was put to death to please the Scots Covenanters. Carew was buried in the graveyard attached to St Augustine's Tower, Hackney.

His social standing seemed unaffected either by his execution, or that of his half-brother in 1660; John inherited title and estates, and he and Richard both served as MPs. Of their three sisters, Mary married John Sparke (1636-1680), MP for Plymouth, Joan married Walter Kendall, MP for Lostwithiel. Bridget's husband was John Pendarves of Roscrow; their son Alexander was an MP from 1689 to 1725.

== Sources ==
- Cruikshanks, Eveline (1983). KENDALL, Walter (1626-96), of Pelyn, nr. Lostwithiel, Cornw (Online ed.). Cambridge University Press.
- Cruikshanks, Eveline (2002). CAREW, Richard (1641-91), of Abertanat, Salop. in The History of Parliament: the House of Commons 1690-1715 (Online ed.). Cambridge University Press.
- Hayton, David (2002). PENDARVES, Alexander (1662-1725), of Roskrow, Gluvias, Cornw in the House of Commons, 1690-1715. Cambridge University Press.
- Holford-Strevens, L. A. (2004). "Carew, Sir Richard, first baronet". Oxford Dictionary of National Biography (online ed.). Oxford University Press. doi:10.1093/ref:odnb/4636. (Subscription, Wikipedia Library access or UK public library membership required.)
- Hopper, Andrew (2012). Turncoats and Renegadoes: Changing Sides during the English Civil Wars. OUP. ISBN 978-0199575855.
- Wedgwood, C. V. (1958). The King's War, 1641–1647 (2001 ed.). Penguin Classics. ISBN 978-0141390727.
- Wright, Richard (2008). "Carew, Sir Alexander, second baronet". Oxford Dictionary of National Biography (online ed.). Oxford University Press. doi:10.1093/ref:odnb/4622. (Subscription, Wikipedia Library access or UK public library membership required.)

Parliament of England
Preceded by William Godolphin; Richard Buller	Member of Parliament for Cornwall; 1640–1643; With: Sir Bevil Grenville 1640–1642	Vacant Title next held by Hugh Boscawen; Nicholas Trefusis
Baronetage of England
Preceded by Richard Carew	Baronet (of Antony); 1643–1644	Succeeded by John Carew
