= Hugh Boscawen (1625–1701) =

English politician (1625-1701)

Arms of Boscawen: Ermine, a rose gules barbed and seeded proper

Hugh Boscawen (1625 – 30 May 1701) was an English politician who sat in the House of Commons on seven occasions between 1646 and 1701.

== Origins ==
Boscawen was the second son of Hugh Boscawen of Tregothnan, Cornwall by his wife Margaret Rolle, daughter of Robert Rolle (1560–1633) of Heanton Satchville, Petrockstowe, Devon. He was baptised on 21 August 1625. His brothers were Nicholas Boscawen, Charles Boscawen (1627–1689), and Edward Boscawen (1628–1685). He and his brothers Charles and Edward were MPs in Cornwall. His brother Edward was the father of Hugh Boscawen, 1st Viscount Falmouth (1680–1734). The Boscawens are an ancient Cornish family. His father Hugh Boscawen (fl.1620) of Tregothnan was thirteenth in descent from a certain Henry de Boscawen. He derived a huge income from his copper mines at Chacewater and Gwennap where he was the principal landowner. The Chacewater mine, now known as Wheal Busy, was located in what was known at one time as "the richest square mile on Earth". During its life it produced over 100,000 tons of copper ore, and 27,000 tons of arsenic.

== Career ==
In December 1646, Boscawen was elected Member of Parliament for Cornwall in the second half or the Long Parliament but refused to sit after Pride's Purge in 1648. From 1647 to 1652 he was commissioner for assessment for Cornwall. He became a J.P. in 1651 and was again commissioner for assessment in 1657. He was re-elected MP for Cornwall in 1659 for the Third Protectorate Parliament in which he attacked the abuses of the Protectorate. In December he signed the Cornish address for a free parliament.

In 1660 Boscawen stood for parliament at Cornwall and at Grampound, but failing to be elected for Cornwall sat in the Convention Parliament for Grampound until the Cornwall seat was restored to him on petition in July. He was a colonel of the Militia from April 1660 to 1680, and a commissioner for oyer and terminer on the western circuit in July 1660. In 1661 he was elected MP for Tregoney for the Cavalier Parliament, where he sat until 1685. He was stannator at Blackmore in 1673 and commissioner for recusants in Cornwall in 1675. By 1690 he was recorder of Tregoney. He was re-elected MP for Cornwall in 1689 and held the seat until his death in 1701. Boscawen was very active in all the parliaments in which he sat, and as a strong Protestant was considered the "great pillar of the presbyterians". From 1698 until his death he was governor of St Mawes.

== Marriage and children ==
In 1651 Boscawen married Lady Margaret Clinton, eldest daughter of Theophilus Clinton, 4th Earl of Lincoln, 12th Baron Clinton (1600–1667), and co-heiress of her brother Edward Clinton, 5th Earl of Lincoln, 13th Baron Clinton (d. 1692). They had eight sons, all of whom predeceased their father, and two daughters, only one of whom survived, becoming his sole heiress:

- Bridget Boscawen (d.1708), married Hugh Fortescue (1665–1719), MP, of Penwarne, Cornwall and Filleigh, Devon. Their son was Hugh Fortescue, 1st Earl of Clinton, 14th Baron Clinton (1696–1751), builder of the Palladian mansion Castle Hill, Filleigh, who died childless.

Most of his Cornish Estates, including the family seat at Tregothnan, passed to his nephew, Hugh Boscawen, 1st Viscount Falmouth.

== Death ==
Boscawen died on 30 May 1701 at the age of 75.

Parliament of England
Preceded by Bevil Grenville; Sir Alexander Carew, 2nd Baronet	Member of Parliament for Cornwall; 1646–1648; With: Nicholas Trefusis	Succeeded by Not represented in Rump Parliament
Preceded by Thomas Ceely Richard Carter; Anthony Rous; John St Aubyn; Walter Moyle; Francis Rous; Anthony Nicholl William Braddon	Member of Parliament for Cornwall; 1659; With: Francis Buller	Succeeded by Not represented in restored Rump
Preceded by Sir John Trevor	Member of Parliament for Grampound; 1660; With: Thomas Herle; John Tanner	Succeeded by John Tanner; Charles Trevanion
Preceded by Sir John Carew, 3rd Baronet; Robert Robartes	Member of Parliament for Cornwall; 1660; With: Francis Buller	Succeeded by Sir Jonathan Trelawny, 2nd Baronet; Sir John Coryton, 1st Baronet
Preceded by Sir John Temple; Sir Peter Courtney	Member of Parliament for Tregoney; 1661–1685; With: Thomas Herle; Robert Boscawen; John Tanner; Charles Trevanion	Succeeded by Charles Porter; Charles Trevanion
Preceded by Lord Lansdown; Francis Robartes	Member of Parliament for Cornwall; 1689–1701; With: Sir John Carew, 3rd Baronet; Francis Robartes; John Speccot	Succeeded by John Speccot; Richard Edgcumbe
