= Richard Carter (MP for Cornwall) =

English politician

Richard Carter (1617–1668) was an English politician who sat in the House of Commons in 1654 and 1656.

Carter was the son of John Carter of Columb, Cornwall. He matriculated at Exeter College, Oxford on 9 September 1634, aged 17. He was of St. Columb, or Columb Major.

In 1654, Carter was elected Member of Parliament for Cornwall in the First Protectorate Parliament. He was re-elected MP for Cornwall in 1656 for the Second Protectorate Parliament.

Carter died at the age of 50 and was buried on 29 January 1668.

Parliament of England
Preceded by Robert Bennet; Francis Langdon; Anthony Rous; John Bawden	Member of Parliament for Cornwall; 1654–1656; With: Thomas Ceely 1654–1656; Anthony Rous 1654–1656; Walter Moyle 1654–1656; Anthony Nichols 1654–1656; Charles Boscawen 1654; Thomas Gewen 1654; James Launce 1654; Francis Rous 1656; William Braddon 1656; John St Aubyn 1656	Succeeded by Hugh Boscawen; Francis Buller
