= Francis Buller (died 1682) =

English politician

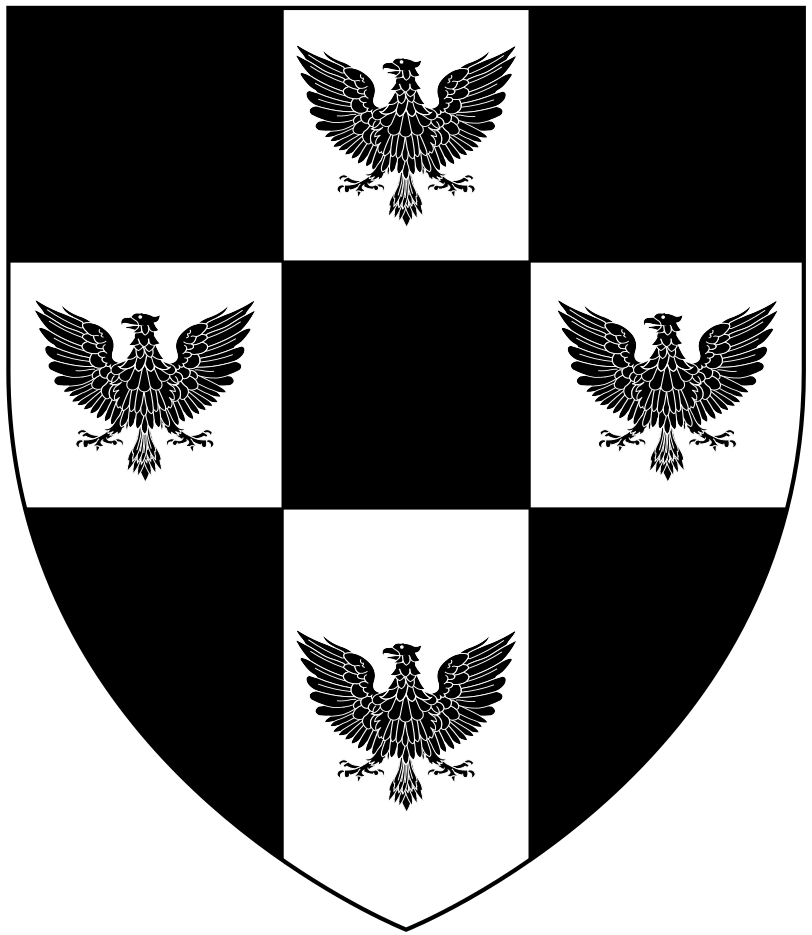
Arms of Buller: Sable, on a cross argent quarter pierced of the field four eagles displayed of the first

Francis Buller (c. 1630 – 1682) was an English politician who sat in the House of Commons between 1659 and 1679.

== Origins ==
Buller was the eldest son and heir of Francis Buller, MP, of Shillingham near Saltash in Cornwall, by his wife Thomasine Honeywood and was baptised at Saltash on 10 January 1630. His younger brother and eventual heir was John Buller (1632–1716), also a Cornish MP.

== Education ==
He was educated at Leyden in 1643 and at Trinity College, Cambridge where he was awarded BA in 1647. He also entered Middle Temple in 1646, received MA from Oxford in 1649 and was called to the bar in 1652.

== Career ==
In 1659, Buller was elected Member of Parliament for Cornwall in the Third Protectorate Parliament. In 1660 he was elected MP for Saltash in the Convention Parliament and re-elected in 1661 for the Cavalier Parliament remaining until 1679. He was considered one of the most powerful presbyterians in the country. In 1662 he became recorder of Saltash. He was active in parliament on behalf of the tinners of Cornwall. In 1666 he was tried under the Security Act for treason on account of indiscrete speech and was fined £30,000. He lost his own estate and his first wife's estate was alienated. Later he retired to the Cambridgeshire estate of his second wife. He received few votes in the election of 1679 and did not stand for parliament again.

== Marriages and progeny ==
Buller married twice:

- Firstly on 22 October 1652 to Elizabeth Grosse, daughter and sole heiress of Ezekiel Grosse of Gowlden, attorney of Cornwall. She inherited 17 manors from her father. Their son James Buller (d.1707) died without issue, when his heir became his uncle John Buller (1632–1716), MP.
- Secondly in 1666 to Lady Catherine Maynard, daughter of John Rushout, merchant of London, and widow of Sir John Maynard of Tooting Graveney, Surrey.

== Death ==
Buller died "in a frenzy" at the age of 52.

Parliament of England
Preceded by Thomas Ceely Richard Carter; Anthony Rous; John St Aubyn; Walter Moyle; Francis Rous; Anthony Nicholl William Braddon	Member of Parliament for Cornwall; 1659; With: Hugh Boscawen	Succeeded by Not represented in restored Rump
Preceded by Not represented in restored Rump	Member of Parliament for Saltash; 1660–1679; With: Anthony Buller 1660; John Buller 1661–1679	Succeeded by Bernard Granville; Nicholas Courtney
