= Robert Bennet (Roundhead) =

Robert Bennet (1605–1683) was an English politician who sat in the House of Commons between 1653 and 1654. He fought in the Parliamentary army in the English Civil War.

== Biography ==
Bennet was the eldest son of Richard Bennet, of Hexworthy in the parish of Lawhitton in Cornwall. He matriculated at Exeter College, Oxford on 13 December 1622, aged 17 and was awarded BA on 25 October 1624. He was a student of the Middle Temple in 1622. Bennet was a Parliamentary colonel, and governor of St. Michael's Mount and St. Mawes Castle in the Civil War.

In 1653, Bennet was nominated as Member of Parliament for Cornwall in the Barebones Parliament. He was elected MP for Launceston in 1654 for the First Protectorate Parliament.

Bennet died at the age of 79 and was buried at Lawhitton on 7 July 1683.

Parliament of England
Preceded by Not represented in Rump Parliament	Member of Parliament for Cornwall; 1653; With: Francis Langdon; Anthony Rous; John Bawden	Succeeded by Thomas Ceely; Anthony Rous; Walter Moyle; Anthony Nichols; Richard Carter; Charles Boscawen; Thomas Gewen; James Launce
Preceded by Not represented in Barebones Parliament	Member of Parliament for Launceston; 1654	Succeeded by Thomas Gewen
