= Walter Vincent =

English politician (1631–1680)

Walter Vincent (15 April 1631 – c. July 1680) was an English politician who sat in the House of Commons at various times between 1656 and 1680.

Vincent was the son of Henry Vincent, a lawyer and his wife Elizabeth. His father was an attorney of Truro and Vincent also became a thriving lawyer living at Truro in Cornwall. In 1656, he was elected Member of Parliament for Truro in the Second Protectorate Parliament. He was re-elected MP for Truro in the Third Protectorate Parliament in 1659. In 1660, Vincent was elected MP for Truro again in the Convention Parliament. In 1667 he purchased the manor of Trelevan. He was elected MP for Mitchell in 1679.

Vincent was appointed a Baron of the Exchequer in 1680. He died on his journey to London, before he had chance to be sworn in at the age of 49.

Vincent married Jane Nosworthy and had sons Walter and Henry who were also in parliament.

Parliament of England
Preceded by Francis Rous	Member of Parliament for Truro; 1656–1659; With: Charles Boscawen 1659	Succeeded by Not represented in Restored Rump
Preceded by Seat restored	Member of Parliament for Truro; 1660–1661; With: Edward Boscawen	Succeeded by Nicholas Arundell
Preceded by Francis Hawley	Member of Parliament for Mitchell; 1679–1680; With: Sir John St Aubyn	Succeeded by Henry Vincent
