= Henry Vincent (1653–1717) =

English politician

Henry Vincent (1653 – 28 December 1717) was an English politician and lawyer who sat as MP for Mitchell in March 1681, Truro from 1685 till 1687 and 2 February 1689 till 1713.

He was baptised on 9 July 1653. He was the first son of Walter Vincent and Jane, the daughter of Edward Nosworthy. He is the brother of Walter Vincent. He was educated at Exeter College, Oxford in 1667 and entered the Inner Temple in 1667, he was called to the bar in 1674. On 22 October 1679, his marriage was licensed to Rebecca, the daughter of Henry Searle and they had three sons (one predeceased him).
