= Walter Vincent (1663–1692) =

English politician (1663–1692)

Walter Vincent (1663 – 25 April 1692) was an English Tory politician and lawyer. He sat as MP for St. Ives in 1689 and Grampound from 1690 till April 1692.

He was baptised on 25 May 1663. He was the third son of Walter Vincent and the brother of Henry Vincent. He was educated at Exeter College, Oxford and matriculated in 1678. In 1678, he entered the Middle Temple and was called to the bar in 1685. That year he was nomintated to the Truro corporation, but was removed for opposing the religious policies of James II. At the Glorious Revolution of 1688 he was among the gentlemen to join William of Orange after the landing at Torbay and was given a commission as a captain of foot.

He sat as MP for St Ives in 1689 and Grampound from 1690 till April 1692. In 1689 he voted that the throne was not vacant, although was thereafter recorded as a court Tory. In 1691, he served under the Earl of Portland in Flanders during the Nine Years' War. He never married and died in office in April 1692.
