= John Speccot (1665–1705) =

English Tory politician (1665–1705)

John Speccot (April 1665 – 1705) was an English Tory politician.

== Biography ==
Speccot was the second, but eldest surviving son, of John Speccot and Honor Eliot. He was educated at Exeter College, Oxford. In 1685, he was elected to the Loyal Parliament as a Tory Member of Parliament for Newport. On 9 April 1689 he married a daughter of John Robartes, 1st Earl of Radnor. He represented Foweymore in the Cornish Stannary Parliament of 1686. Speccot was a notable supporter of the Tory line at the Convention Parliament in 1689, which led to Bishop Trelawny endorsing Speccot for the Cornwall county seat in the 1690 English general election. Speccot was, however, unable to mount a sustained campaign and he was elected again for Newport. On 14 February 1695 he was summoned briefly into custody for failing to attend the Commons.

Speccot was returned unopposed for Cornwall in 1695 alongside Hugh Boscawen. Increasingly associated with the High Tories, Speccot refused to sign the Association of 1696. He was re-elected at the 1698 English general election. He suffered periods of illness in 1699 and 1700 which reduced his attendance, but was re-elected at the January 1701 English general election. Shortly afterwards, on account of declining health, he withdrew from parliamentary politics and he did not stand at the November 1701 English general election. He died of apoplexy in London on 16 June 1705 and was buried at St Anne's Church, Soho.

Parliament of England
Preceded by William Morice; Ambrose Manaton	Member of Parliament for Newport with William Morice (1685–1687); Sir William Morice, Bt (1689–1690); The Viscount Newhaven (1690); John Morice (1690–1695); 1685–1695	Succeeded by John Morice; The Viscount Newhaven
Preceded by Francis Robartes; Hugh Boscawen	Member of Parliament for Cornwall with Hugh Boscawen (1695–1701); Richard Edgcumbe (1701); 1695–1701	Succeeded by John Granville; James Buller
