= Charles Trevanion (1631–1703) =

English Tory politician (c.1631–1703)

Charles Trevanion (c. 1631 – 26 November 1703) was an English politician.

== Biography ==
Trevanion was the son of the Royalist officer, John Trevanion and Anne Arundell, daughter of John Arundell. In summer 1660, Trevanion was appointed a justice of the peace and commissioner for assessment for Cornwall. In 1661, he was returned to the Cavalier Parliament as a Member of Parliament for Grampound. He was a relatively inactive member, but was appointed to seven committees. He was re-elected at the March 1679 English general election and voted in favour of the Exclusion Bill, likely motivated by his hatred for Roman Catholicism.

At the October 1679 English general election, Trevanion was elected to sit for Tregony. He had likely abandoned his support for the Exclusion Bill, as he remained on the local commission of the peace in 1680. He was not recorded as making any speeches or sitting on any committees in the Exclusion Bill Parliament of 1680 or the Oxford Parliament of 1681. In 1685, Trevanion was elected to the Loyal Parliament as a Tory. He was appointed to one committee, on the bill for the relief of poor prisoners for debt. He gave evasive answers to the three questions posed by James II on the proposed repeal of the Test Acts 1673 & 1678. In summer 1688, he was removed from his local offices. After the Glorious Revolution later that year, he took no further part in public affairs.

He married Jane Drummond, a daughter and co-heiress of Sir Maurice Drummond. They had two sons and one daughter. Trevanion died on 26 November 1703 and was succeeded in his estates by his eldest son, John Trevanion.

Parliament of England
Preceded by John Tanner; Hugh Boscawen	Member of Parliament for Grampound with John Tanner (1661–1679); Sir Joseph Tredenham (1679); 1661–1679	Succeeded by John Tanner; Nicholas Herle
Preceded by Hugh Boscawen; John Tanner	Member of Parliament for Tregony with Hugh Boscawen (1679–1681); Charles Porter (1685–1687); 1679–1687	Succeeded by Charles Boscawen; Hugh Fortescue
