= John Feilder =

The Honourable John Feilder MP

Member of Parliament for St. Ives
- In office 1659–1659
- Preceded by: John St Aubyn
- Succeeded by: James Praed

Governor of Portsmouth
- In office 1649–1649
- Preceded by: George Goring, 1st Earl of Norwich
- Succeeded by: John Desborough

Member of Parliament for St. Ives
- In office 1647 – December 1648
- Preceded by: Seat unrepresented
- Succeeded by: James Praed

High Sheriff of Hampshire
- In office 1642–1643
- Preceded by: Sir Hugh Stewkley
- Succeeded by: William Kingsmill

Personal details
- Born: Kingston, London
- Education: St Edmund Hall, Oxford

John Feilder was an English politician who sat as a royal independent during the Rump Parliament, where he has been described as "one of the most conservative influences".

After attending Oxford University he joined the army, becoming a colonel and captain of foot, and captain of a troop of horse during the English Civil War, when he was initially commander of Farnham Castle and thereafter commanded the forces of Surrey. In 1649 he briefly served as Governor of Portsmouth .

He entered politics after marrying the sister of Sir John Trevor, a fellow Cornish MP. He was High Sheriff of Hampshire for 1642 and then returned as Member of Parliament for St Ives, Cornwall for 1647–1653 and again in 1659.

The family lived at Horkesley Hall, in Essex, and Heyshott Manor, in West Sussex.
