= Trevenning =

Hamlet in Cornwall, England

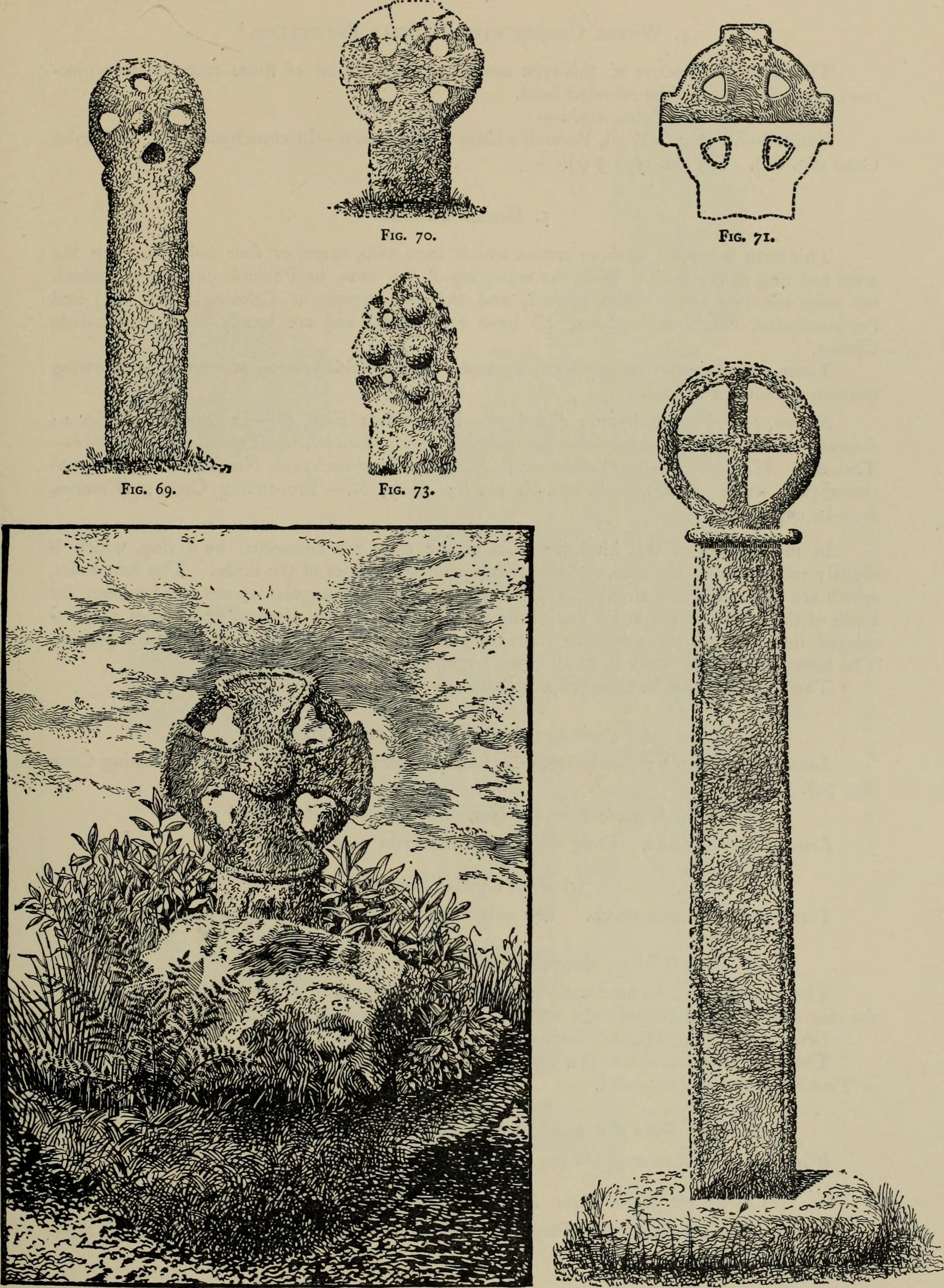
Trevenning Cross (fig. 70) illustrated in The Victoria History of the County of Cornwall (1906)

Trevenning is a hamlet south of Michaelstow, Cornwall, England, UK.

There are three Cornish crosses and a cross base here. In 1896, they were in Mr. Bastard's garden. Mr. Bastard had brought two of the crosses from part of Bodmin Moor in the parish of St Breward in 1888.

Trevenning Cross is at a road junction about one and a half miles northeast of St Tudy churchtown. It was found in the hedge some years before 1896 close to its present position by J. R. Collins of Bodmin.
