= Walter Moyle =

English politician and political writer

- Born: 3 November 1672; Bake, Cornwall
- Died: 10 June 1721 (aged 48); Bake
- Resting place: St German's Priory, Cornwall
- Education: Exeter College, Oxford
- Occupations: politician and political writer
- Spouse: Henrietta Maria Davie
- Children: two sons and one daughter
- Parent(s): Sir Walter Moyle and Thomasine Morice
- Relatives: John Moyle (grandfather)

Walter Moyle (1672–1721) was an English politician and political writer, an advocate of classical republicanism.

== Life ==
He was born at Bake in St Germans, Cornwall, on 3 November 1672, the third, but eldest surviving son of Sir Walter Moyle, who died in September 1701, by his wife Thomasine, daughter of Sir William Morice. Walter Moyle the Elder had been High Sheriff of Cornwall in 1671, and was the son of John Moyle, the friend of Sir John Eliot.

After having been grounded in classical learning, probably at Liskeard grammar school, he matriculated at Exeter College, Oxford, on 18 March 1689, and a set of verses by him was inserted in the university collection of poems for William III and Mary II, 1689; but he left Oxford without taking a degree. About 1708 he contributed towards the erection of new buildings at Exeter College opposite the front gate and stretching eastwards, and his second son was a fellow of the college. On 26 January 1691 he was specially admitted at the Middle Temple, and took up the study of constitutional law and history. At first Moyle frequented Maynwaring's coffee-house in Fleet Street and the Grecian near the Temple, but to be nearer the realms of fashion he removed to Covent Garden, and became a regular companion of the wits at Will's.

Moyle sat in parliament for Saltash from 1695 to 1698. He was a zealous Whig, with a keen desire to encourage British trade, and a strong antipathy to ecclesiastical establishments.

Moyle was married on 6 May 1700 to Henrietta Maria, daughter of John Davie of Bideford, Devon. They had two sons and one daughter. She died on 9 December 1762, aged 85, and was buried at St. Germans on 15 December. Moyle died at Bake on 10 June 1721, and was buried at St German's Priory on 13 June. A monument was placed to his memory at the end of the north aisle, near the chancel.

== Works ==
Moyle speculated in his retirement from public life, in 1698, on forms and laws of government. He once had the intention of compiling a history of Greece, and later he went into ecclesiastical history. In the autumn of 1713 he finished a new library at Bake, and began to stock it. He was a student of botany and ornithology, making collections on the birds of Cornwall and Devon and was described as the ″Father of Cornish Ornithology″ by Roger Penhallurick in 1978. He helped John Ray, as is acknowledged in the preface in the second edition of the Synopsis Methodica Stirpium Britannicarum, and promised to send William Sherard a catalogue of his specimens for insertion in the Philosophical Transactions. Books in his study were full of notes. His library and manuscripts were destroyed by fire, at Bake, in 1808.

After Moyle's death Thomas Sergeant edited the Works of Walter Moyle, none of which were ever before published, 1726, 2 vols. It contained in the first volume:

- Essay on the Constitution of the Roman Government.
- A Charge to the Grand Jury at Liskeard, April 1706.
- Letters to Dr. William Musgrave of Exeter.
- Dissertation on the age of Philopatris, a Dialogue commonly attributed to Lucian.
- Letters to and from Tancred Robinson, Sherard, and others.

The second volume comprised:

- Remarks upon some Passages in Dr. Prideaux's Connection.
- Miracle of the Thundering Legion examin'd, in several Letters between Moyle and K—— [i.e. Richard King of Topsham, near Exeter].

This collection was followed in the subsequent year by a reprint by Edmund Curll of The Whole Works of Walter Moyle that were Published by Himself, with an account of his life and writing by Anthony Hammond (1668–1738). It contained, in addition to some works already mentioned:

- Xenophon's Discourse on the Revenue of Athens, which was translated at Charles Davenant's request, and after it had been included in his Discourses on the Publick Revenues and the Trade of England, 1698, was reprinted in Sir William Petty's Political Arithmetic, 1751, in Davenant's 'Works' in 1771, and in the Works of Xenophon translated by Ashley Cooper and others, 1831.
- An Essay on Lacedæmonian Government, which was included, with three other tracts by him, in A Select Collection of Tracts by W. Moyle, printed at Dublin in 1728 and Glasgow in 1750.

The Essay on the Roman Government, which was inserted in Sergeant's collection, was reprinted by John Thelwall in 1796, and, when translated into French by Bertrand Barrière, was published at Paris in 1801. The series of Remarks on some Passages in Dr. Prideaux's Connection was included in the French editions of the work that were published in 1728, 1732, 1742, and 1744. Moyle's Examination of the Miracle of the Thundering Legion was attacked by William Whiston, and Thomas Woolston, and Thomas Hearne, in his volume of John of Glastonbury, referred to some of Moyle's criticisms on the "Shield" of Dr. John Woodward, but he was defended by Curll in An Apology for the Writings of Walter Moyle, 1727. His 'Remarks on the Thundering Legion' were translated into Latin by Johann Lorenz von Mosheim and published at Leipzig in 1733, discussed, with Moyle's Notes on Lucian, in Nathaniel Lardner's Collection of Ancient Testimonies to the Truth of the Christian Religion, ii. 229, 241–50, 355–69, and they formed the text of some letters from Charles Yorke to William Warburton in Francis Kilvert's Selection from the Papers of Warburton, 1841, pp. 124 seqq.

Around 1693 Moyle translated four pieces by Lucian, which were included in the version issued in 1711 under the direction of John Dryden. Dryden acknowledged his indebtedness to Moyle for the argument on the reason why imitation pleases, as well as for "all the particular passages in Aristotle and Horace to explain the art of poetry by that of painting"; and again praised him in the Discourse on Epick Poetry. Charles Gildon published in 1694 a volume of Miscellaneous Letters and Essays' containing 'An Apology for Poetry, in an essay directed to Moyle, and letters between him, William Congreve, and John Dennis are included in Dennis's collections of Letters upon Several Occasions, 1696, and Familiar and Courtly Letters of Voiture, with other Letters by Dryden, Wycherley, Congreve, 1700, and reprinted in Moyle's Works in 1727. In 1721 Dennis issued two more volumes of Original Letters.

Letters from Moyle to Horace Walpole on the passage of the Septennial Bill were printed in William Coxe's Sir Robert Walpole. Several were in the Gentleman's Magazine for 1837, 1838, and 1839, and 45 letters on ancient history which passed between him and two local correspondents in Devon were preserved in manuscript at St John's College, Cambridge. There are references to him in Sherard's correspondence. Charles Hopkins addressed an ode to him (Epistolary Poems, 1694), and John Glanvill published a translation of Horace, bk. i. ode 24, which he prepared on his death (Poems, 1725, pp. 205–6).

With John Trenchard, Moyle started the Standing Army Controversy in 1697 by issuing An Argument showing that a Standing Army is inconsistent with a Free Government, and absolutely destructive to the Constitution of the English Monarchy, which was reprinted in 1698 and 1703, and included in The Pamphleteer, x. 109–40 (1817). It caused offence at court, and James Vernon questioned the printer to discover the author; and it produced several other pamphlets, including Lord Somers's A Letter ballancing the necessity of keeping of a Land-Force in Times of Peace.

Parliament of England
Preceded by Sir John Carew; Michael Hill	Member of Parliament for Saltash; 1695–1698; With: Francis Buller 1695–1698; Francis Pengelly 1698	Succeeded by John Specott; John Morice
