= John Carew (regicide) =

English politician and regicide (1622-1660)

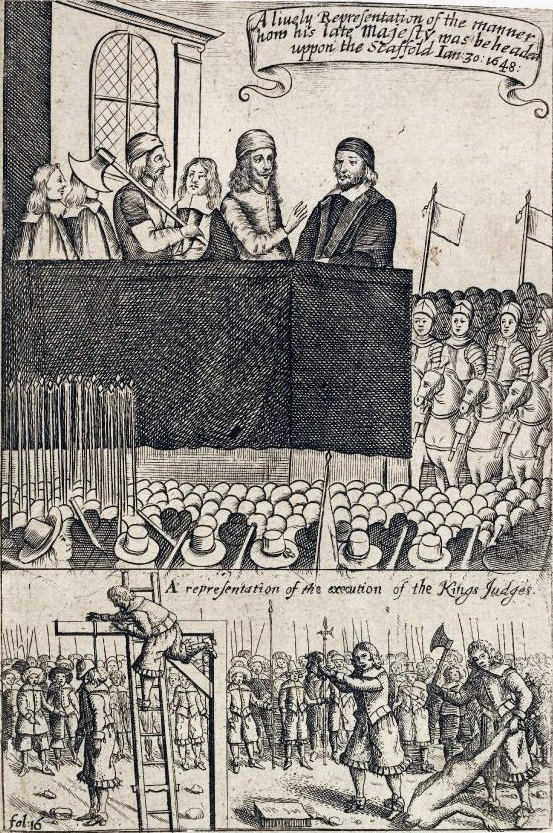
- Contemporary print showing the Execution of Charles I (top), with regicides like Carew (bottom)

Nominated for Devon in Barebone's Parliament
- In office July 1653 – December 1653

English Council of State
- In office 1651–1653

Member, Board of Admiralty
- In office 1652–1654

Member of Parliament for Tregony
- In office February 1647 – April 1653

Personal details
- Born: 3 July 1622 Antony, Cornwall
- Died: 15 October 1660 (aged 38) Charing Cross, London
- Cause of death: Executed
- Relations: Sir Alexander Carew, 2nd Baronet (half-brother, executed by Parliament 1644)
- Education: Gloucester Hall, Oxford
- Occupation: Politician

John Carew (3 July 1622 - 15 October 1660) was a member of the landed gentry from Antony, Cornwall and MP for Tregony from 1647 to 1653. A prominent supporter of the Fifth Monarchists, a millenarianist religious sect, he backed Parliament and the Commonwealth in the Wars of the Three Kingdoms and approved the Execution of Charles I in January 1649. He held various administrative positions during the Interregnum, including membership of the English Council of State, but was deprived of office and jailed in 1655 for his opposition to The Protectorate.

Although aware that as a regicide of Charles I he was likely to be arrested after the 1660 Stuart Restoration, Carew made no attempt to escape. During the trial, he claimed that by signing Charles's death warrant, he was simply complying with a legal Act of Parliament, an argument rejected by the court.

He was found guilty of treason and hanged, drawn and quartered on 15 October 1660, two days after his close friend Thomas Harrison suffered the same fate.

== Personal details ==
John Carew was born 3 July 1622 in Antony, Cornwall, the eldest child of Sir Richard Carew, 1st Baronet (c. 1580–1643), and Grace Rolle (1606–1655), his second wife. He had three full brothers, including Thomas (1624–1681), plus five siblings from his father's first marriage, among them Elizabeth (1605–1679), and Alexander (1608–1644). The latter fought for Parliament in the early stages of the First English Civil War, but was executed in December 1644 after attempting to hand over Drake's Island to the Royalists.

He does not appear to have married or produced children; his estate of Boxhill Manor, now part of the city of Exeter, was confiscated after his death, then returned to his brother Thomas in 1662.

== Career ==
Carew entered Gloucester Hall, Oxford in March 1638, and began legal training at the Inner Temple in November 1639, although there is no record of him graduating from either. When the First English Civil War began in August 1642, the Carew family were among the few members of the Cornish gentry who supported Parliament. As a result, he served on a number of Parliamentary committees for Cornwall, although it was held by the Royalists until their forces in the West Country surrendered on 12 March 1646.

Elected MP for Tregony in 1647, Carew also belonged to the Fifth Monarchists, a Protestant millenarianist group who viewed the execution of Charles I in January 1649 as paving the way for the second coming of Christ. This belief was one reason he became a regicide, as did other members of the sect, including Thomas Harrison, William Goffe, and John Jones Maesygarnedd.

Like many of the other 59 men who signed the death warrant for Charles I, he was in grave danger when Charles II of England was restored to the throne. Some of the 59 fled England but Carew apparently made no attempt to escape and was arrested, put on trial, and found guilty. He was hanged, drawn and quartered on 15 October 1660. Unlike others executed by this method, "his quarters, by a great favour... [were not] hanged up" on public display as a warning to other anti-monarchists, according to contemporary diarist Samuel Pepys.

== Trial ==
Mr John Carew was tried on 12 October 1660.

He found the same usage from the Court as Major-General Harrison had done, being frequently interrupted and council denied, though earnestly desired by him in that point of law touching the authority by which he had acted.

When he saw that all he could say was to no purpose, he frankly acknowledged that he sat in the High Court of Justice, and had signed two warrants, one for summoning the Court in order to the King's trial, and another for his execution.

Upon this the Court, who were well acquainted with the disposition of the jury, permitting him to speak. He said that in the year 1640, a Parliament was called according to the laws and Constitution of this nation: that some differences arising between the King and that Parliament, the King withdrew his person from them. Upon which the Lords and Commons declared ...Here the Court being conscious that their cobweb-coverings were not sufficient to keep out the light of those truths he was going to produce, contrary to the liberty they had promised, interrupted him, under color that what he was about to say, tended not only to justify the action for which he was accused, but to cast a ball of division among those who were present. But Mr. Carew going on to say, 'The Lords and Commons by their declaration---'

Judge Foster interrupted him again, and told him he endeavored to revive those differences which he hoped were laid asleep, and that he did so to blow the trumpet of sedition; demanding if he had ever heard, or could produce an Act of Parliament made by the Commons alone. To this he would have answered, but was not permitted to finish what he began to say, or hardly any one thing he endeavored to speak in his defense during the whole trial;

Mr. Arthur Annesley particularly charging him with the exclusion of the members in the year 1648, of which number he had been one; to which he only replied, 'That it seemed strange to find a man who sat as a judge on the bench to give evidence as to witness in the Court.'

These irregular proceedings unbecoming a court of judicature, obliged Mr. Carew to address himself to the jury, leaving them to judge of the legality of his trial; and appealing to their consciences, whether he had been permitted to make his defense. But they who were not to be diverted from the resolutions they had taken, without any regard to the manner of his trial, declared him guilty as he was accused."

== Execution ==
According to Edmund Ludlow,

On the fifteenth (15 October 1660), Mr. John Carew suffered there also, even their enemies confessing that more steadiness of mind, more contempt of death, and more magnanimity could not be expressed. To all who were present with them (also Major General Harrison), either in prison or at the place where the sentence was executed, they owned that having engaged in the cause of God and their country, they were not at all ashamed to suffer in the manner their enemies thought fit, openly avowing the inward satisfaction of their minds when they reflected upon the actions for which they had been condemned, not doubting the revival of the same cause; and that a time should come when men would have better thoughts of their persons and proceedings.

== See also ==
- Sir Alexander Carew, 2nd Baronet, his brother.
- List of regicides of Charles I
- Long Parliament

== Sources ==
- Hopper, Andrew (2012). Turncoats and Renegadoes: Changing Sides during the English Civil Wars. OUP. ISBN 978-0199575855.
- Holford-Strevens, LA (2004). "Carew, Sir Richard, first baronet". Oxford Dictionary of National Biography (online ed.). Oxford University Press. doi:10.1093/ref:odnb/4636. (Subscription, Wikipedia Library access or UK public library membership required.)
- Lysons, Daniel; Lysons, Samuel (1822). Magna Britannia: Volume 6, Devonshire. Cadell & Davies.
- Peacey, LT (2004). "Carew, John (1622–1660)". Oxford Dictionary of National Biography (online ed.). Oxford University Press. doi:10.1093/ref:odnb/4630. (Subscription, Wikipedia Library access or UK public library membership required.)
- This article incorporates text from a publication now in the public domain: Courtney, William Prideaux (1887). "Carew, John (d.1660)". In Stephen, Leslie (ed.). Dictionary of National Biography. Vol. 9. London: Smith, Elder & Co.
- The Memoirs of Edmund Ludlow, Lieutenant-General of the Horse, in the Army of the Commonwealth of England, 1625-1672, Edited with Appendices of Letters and Illustrative Documents, by C.H. Firth, M.A., in two volumes, Oxford, At the Clarendon Press, 1894
- Wedgwood, C.V. (1958). The King's War, 1641–1647 (1983 ed.). Penguin Classics. ISBN 978-0-14-006991-4.
