= Thomas Gewen =

English politician

Thomas Gewen (1585 – November 1660) was an English politician who sat in the House of Commons variously between 1645 and 1660.

He was the grandson of Thomas and the son of Christopher Gewen of Werrington. He was educated at the Queen's College, Oxford and the Inner Temple. He married twice; first to a daughter of Edward Cosworth, with whom he had a son. In July 1622, he married Mary, the daughter of Matthew Springham, with whom he had one son and two daughters.

Thomas Gewen settled at Bradridge, in the parish of Boyton in Cornwall and was a joint auditor for the Duchy of Cornwall, until he was deprived of his position at the outbreak of the Civil War for his support of the parliamentary cause.

He was appointed by Act of Parliament as a member of the Cornwall Committee for raising money. He was elected member of parliament (MP) for Launceston in 1645 for the second part of the Long Parliament but was excluded under Pride's Purge in 1648. In 1654, he was elected MP for Cornwall in the First Protectorate Parliament. He was elected MP for Launceston in 1656 for the Second Protectorate Parliament and in 1659 for the Third Protectorate Parliament. In 1657, Gewen was a strong supporter of Cromwell but by 1660, he was opposed to the military party and was in favour of monarchy and the House of Lords. He was also a sturdy Presbyterian and was considered one of the main persecutors of Quakers.

He was Recorder of Launceston, and as justice of the peace was responsible for conducting marriages.

Gewen was re-elected MP for Launceston in April 1660 which he held until his death a few months later at the age of 75.

Parliament of England
Preceded by John Harris; Ambrose Manaton	Member of Parliament for Launceston; 1645–1648; With: John Harris	Succeeded by Not represented in the Rump Parliament
Preceded by Robert Bennet; Francis Langdon; Anthony Rous; John Bawden	Member of Parliament for Cornwall; 1654; With: Charles Boscawen; Thomas Ceely; Richard Carter; Anthony Rous; James Launce; Walter Moyle; Anthony Nicholl	Succeeded by Thomas Ceely; Richard Carter; Anthony Rous; John St Aubin Walter Moyle; Francis Rous; Anthony Nicholl William Braddon
Preceded by Robert Bennet	Member of Parliament for Launceston; 1656–1659; With: Robert Bennet 1659	Succeeded by Not represented in restored Rump
Preceded by Not represented in restored Rump	Member of Parliament for Launceston; 1660; With: Edward Eliot; John Cloberry	Succeeded by Richard Edgcumbe; Sir Charles Harbord
