= Charles Boscawen =

English politician

Charles Boscawen (1627–1689) was an English politician who sat in the House of Commons variously between 1654 and 1689.

== Origins ==
Boscawen was the son of Hugh Boscawen of Tregothnan, Cornwall by his wife Margaret Rolle, daughter of Robert Rolle (1560–1633) of Heanton Satchville, Petrockstowe, Devon. He was baptised on 28 October 1627. His brothers were Hugh Boscawen (1625–1701), MP, and Edward Boscawen (1628–1685), MP, (father of Hugh Boscawen, 1st Viscount Falmouth (1680–1734)) both of whom also represented Cornish constituencies. The Boscawens are an ancient Cornish family. His father Hugh Boscawen (fl.1620) of Tregothnan was thirteenth in descent from a certain Henry de Boscawen. He derived a huge income from his copper mines at Chacewater and Gwennap where he was the principal landowner. The Chacewater mine, now known as Wheal Busy, was located in what was known at one time as "the richest square mile on Earth". During its life it produced over 100,000 tons of copper ore, and 27,000 tons of arsenic.

== Education ==
He trained as a lawyer at the Inner Temple in 1646.

== Career ==
In December 1654, Boscawen was elected Member of Parliament for Cornwall in the First Protectorate Parliament. He was elected MP for Truro in 1659 for the Third Protectorate Parliament. In 1652 and 1657, he was commissioner for assessment for Cornwall. In December 1659 he was party to the Cornish address for a free parliament. In 1660, he became a J.P. Since then, he was a captain in the militia, and at various times, commissioner for assessment. In 1689, he was elected MP for Tregoney which he held until his death a few months later at the age of 62.

== Personal life ==
Boscawen was unmarried. He was described as a melancholy man who was not fit to be deputed to welcome the Prince of Orange.

Parliament of England
Preceded by Robert Bennet; Francis Langdon; Anthony Rous; John Bawden	Member of Parliament for Cornwall; 1654; With: Thomas Gewen; Thomas Ceely; Richard Carter; Anthony Rous; James Launce; Walter Moyle; Anthony Nicholl	Succeeded by Thomas Ceely; Richard Carter; Anthony Rous; John St Aubin Walter Moyle; Francis Rous; Anthony Nicholl William Braddon
Preceded by Walter Vincent	Member of Parliament for Truro; 1659; With: Walter Vincent	Succeeded by Not represented in restored Rump
Preceded by Charles Porter; Charles Trevanion	Member of Parliament for Tregoney; 1689; With: Hugh Fortescue	Succeeded by Hugh Fortescue; Robert Harley
