= Drake's Island =

Small island in Plymouth Sound, England

Drakes Island
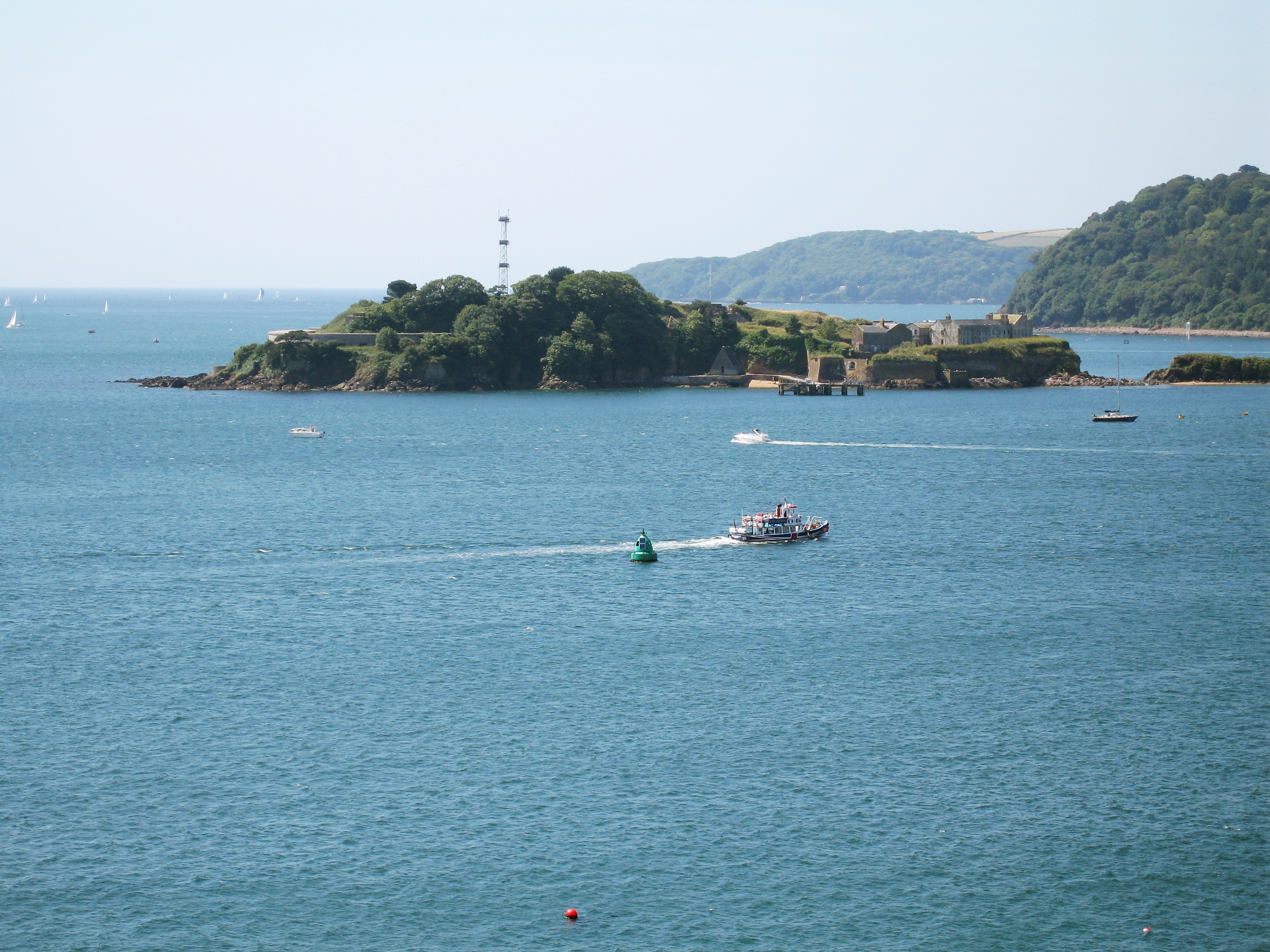
- Image of Drake's Island landing platform from Millbay, Plymouth

- Location within Devon

Geography
- Coordinates: 50°21′20″N 4°9′13″W
- OS grid reference: SX4681952912
- Adjacent to: Plymouth Sound
- Area: 2.6 ha (6.4 acres)
- Length: 400 m (1300 ft)
- Width: 100 m (300 ft)

Administration
- United Kingdom

Additional information
- Time zone: Greenwich Mean Time

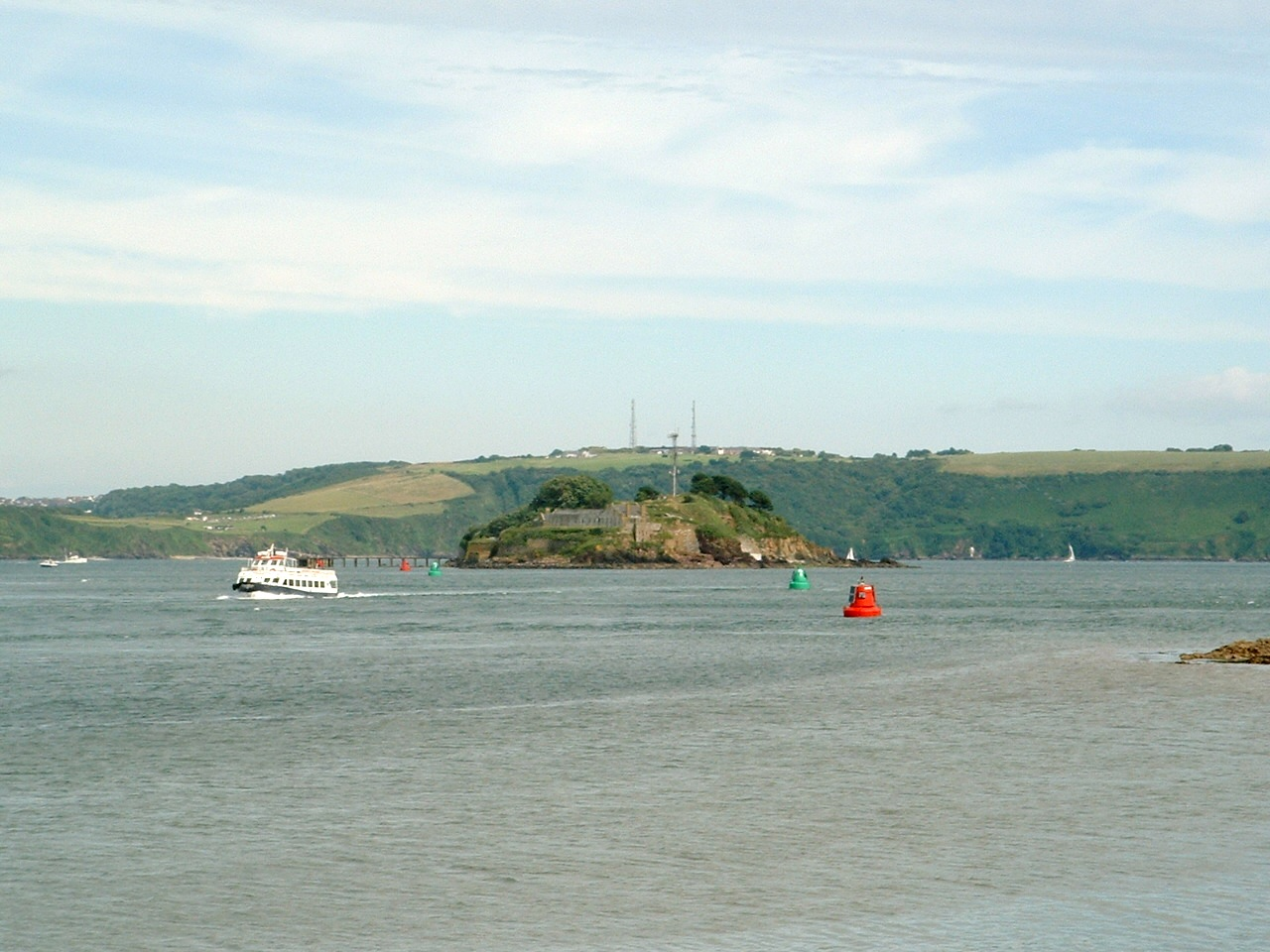
Drake's Island as seen from Mount Edgecumbe

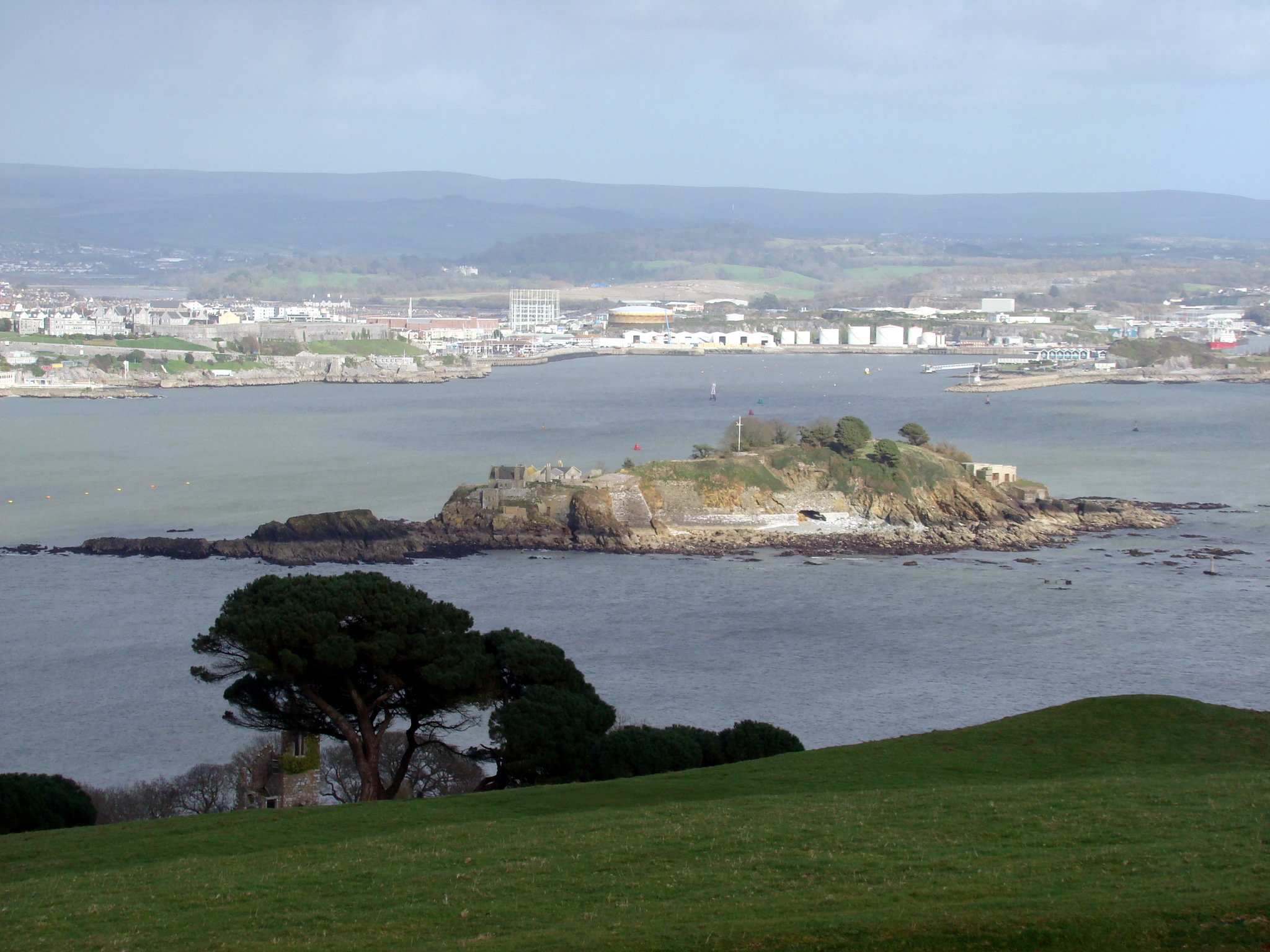
View of Drake's Island from the southern end of Mount Edgecumbe

Drake's Island is a 6.5-acre (2.6-hectare) island approximately 500 metres from land in Plymouth Sound, the stretch of water south of the city of Plymouth, Devon. The rocks which make up the island are volcanic tuff and lava, together with marine limestone of the Devonian period. For more than 400 years the island was fortified.

== History ==
=== 1100s–1700s: Early history ===
The first recorded name for the island was in 1135, when it was referred to as St Michael's after the chapel erected on it. At some later date the chapel was rededicated to St Nicholas and the island adopted the same name. From the latter part of the 16th century the island was occasionally referred to as Drake's Island after Sir Francis Drake, the English privateer who used Plymouth as his home port. Even well into the 19th century, maps and other references continued to refer to the island as St Nicholas's Island and it is only in about the last 100 years that this name has slipped into disuse and the name Drake's Island has been adopted.

It was from Plymouth that Drake sailed in 1577, to return in 1580 having circumnavigated the world, and in 1583 Drake was made governor of the island. From 1549 the island began to be fortified as a defence against the French and Spanish, with barracks for 300 men being built on the island in the late 16th century.

In 1642, during the English Civil War, Plymouth declared itself for Parliament. During the wars, the island was used to defend Plymouth from the Royalist army's siege of the city.

For several centuries, the island remained the focal point of the defence of the three original towns that were to become modern Plymouth. In 1665 the Leveller Robert Lilburne died imprisoned on the island. He had been sentenced to life imprisonment for his part in the regicide of Charles I. A few years later John Lambert, a former general of the New Model Army in the English Civil War, was moved to Drake's Island from Guernsey, where he had been imprisoned since 1662. Like Lilburne, he never regained his liberty, dying on Drake's Island in the winter of 1683.

In June 1774 the first recorded submarine fatality in history occurred north of Drake's Island, when a carpenter named John Day perished while testing a wooden diving chamber attached to the sloop Maria.

=== 1800s–1950: Upgrades and World Wars ===
The 1859 Royal Commission on the Defence of the United Kingdom recommended a huge programme of new fortifications to defend Plymouth. On Drake's Island, the existing battery at the centre of the island was to be replaced by five 12-inch muzzle loading guns in open emplacements. A new battery was to be built on the southwestern end, of 21 9-inch guns in an arc of stone casemates with iron shields. The work was not complete in 1880. Six 12-pounder quick firing guns were added in 1897 and three 6-inch guns became the main armament in 1901; the original muzzle loaders were dumped under a pile of earth. Finally, in 1942, a modern twin 6-pounder gun was installed.

=== 1950–present: recent history ===
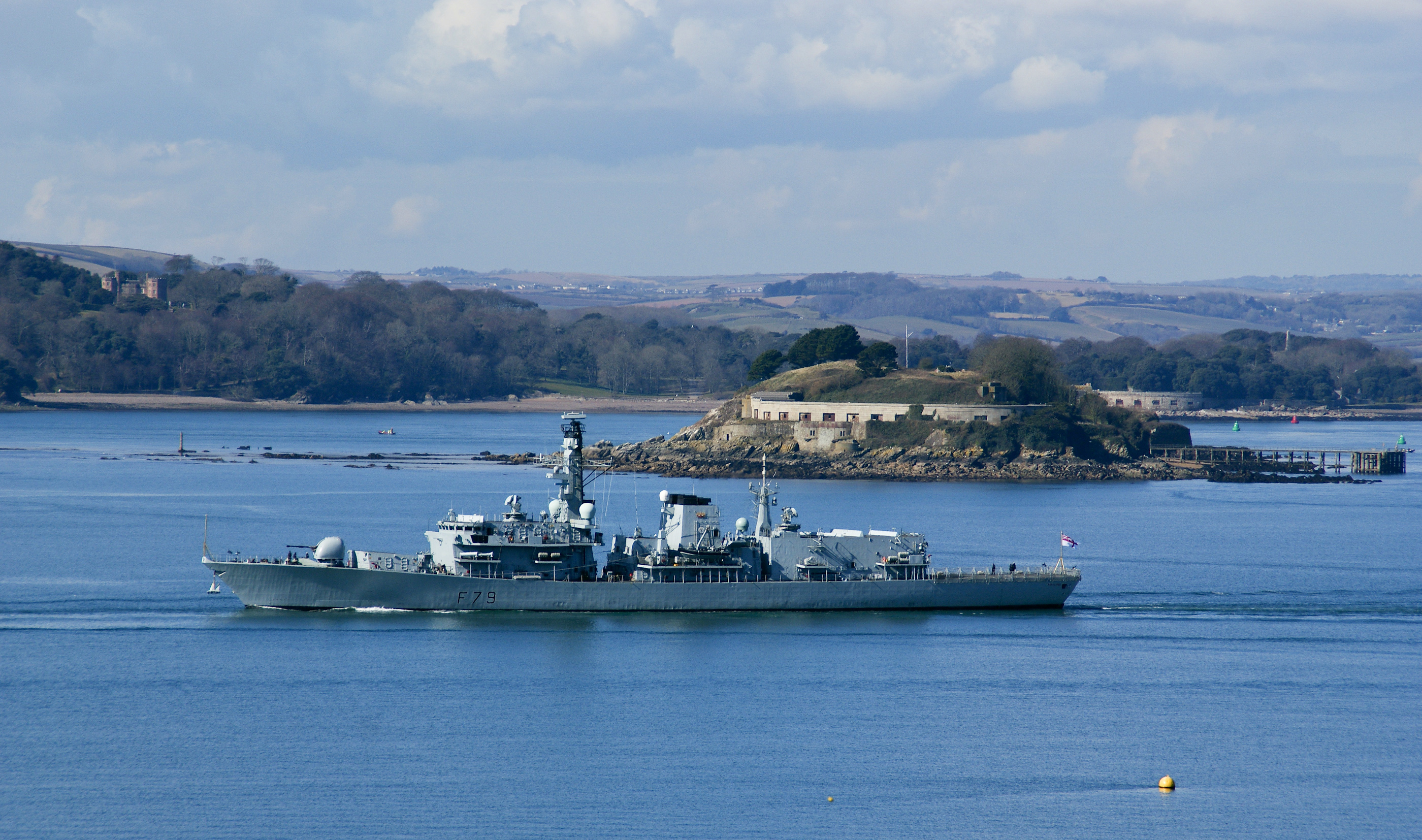
HMS Portland passing Drake's Island

Following World War II Drake's Island remained under the administration of the War Office, which, despite having announced in 1956 that it was no longer needed for defence purposes, did not finally vacate the island until 1963, when Plymouth City Council obtained a lease from the Crown with the aim of establishing a youth adventure training centre there. This centre was opened in 1964, the year in which a mains water supply finally reached the island.

On 1 May 1987 the island got its first telephone line, using a cable attached to the mains water pipe. The telephone number was Plymouth 63393. The warden had previously used the Ministry of Defence system. Drake's Island Adventure Centre, under the custody of the Mayflower Centre Trust, operated until 31 March 1989, when the Mayflower Trust surrendered their lease to the Crown and sold off the boats and sports equipment.

In 1995, Drake's Island was put up for sale by the Crown Estate, with an asking price of £235,000, and had numerous offers. In the end, a bidding war commenced between the then Plymouth Argyle chairman, Dan McCauley, and a Cheshire-born businessman who wanted to open it to the public. McCauley's bid was successful, and he bought the island for £384,000 in 1995, with plans to turn it into a hotel complex.

In 2003, Plymouth City Council turned down a planning application from McCauley to build a hotel and leisure complex complete with helipad. McCauley further submitted planning permission in 2011.

In May 2005 the island attracted British media attention when one of the empty buildings on the island was squatted by a group of anti-nuclear protesters, Trident Ploughshares.

The island's owner, Dan McCauley, received planning consent in April 2017 and released details showing how the Grade II-listed Island House, barracks block and ablutions building could be linked to form a £10 million-plus hotel and spa complex containing 25 bedrooms.

In October 2018, the island was put up for sale for £6 million. It was purchased by Morgan Phillips. Phillips planned to open the island to the public with a museum and heritage centre, thirty years after previously closing.

On 15 March 2020, the island received its first public visitors since 1989 when a one-off public tour was held to raise money for St Luke's Hospice. Drake's Island featured in an episode of the BBC's Antiques Road Trip first broadcast on 17 December 2020, and in an episode of the BBC's Secret Britain first broadcast on 20 April 2016. Regular guided tours have been held on the island since summer 2020.

In August 2026, it was listed for sale, "offers in excess of £2 million", with planning permission for a 43-bed hotel, with Morgan Phillips' company Plymouth Sound Properties Ltd in receivership.

== Bibliography ==
- Woodward, Freddy (1996). The Historic Defences of Plymouth. Cornwall County Council. ISBN 978-1898166467.
