= Anthony Rous =

English politician (1605–1677)

Member of the English Parliament for Helston
- In office May 1660 – 27 June 1660
- Succeeded by: Thomas Robinson

Member of the English Parliament for Cornwall
- In office 17 September 1656 – 4 February 1658
- Succeeded by: Hugh Boscawen; Francis Buller

Member of the English Parliament for Cornwall
- In office 3 September 1654 – 22 January 1655

Member of the English Parliament for Cornwall
- In office 4 July 1653 – 12 December 1653

Personal details
- Born: 1605
- Died: 1 May 1677 (aged 71–72)
- Spouse: Mary Bradshaw
- Children: Francis Rous
- Parents: Robert Rous (father); Jane Pam (mother)

Anthony Rous (1605 – 1 May 1677) was an English politician who sat in the House of Commons at various times between 1653 and 1660. He was an officer in the Parliamentary army in the English Civil War.

Rous was the son of Robert Rous and his wife Jane Pym, daughter of Alexander Pym and niece of John Pym.

In 1653, Rous was elected Member of Parliament for Cornwall in the Barebones Parliament. He was re-elected MP for Cornwall in the First Protectorate Parliament and in the Second Protectorate Parliament.

In April 1660, Rous was elected Member of Parliament for Helston for the Convention Parliament in a double return. He was seated in May 1660, but the election was declared void on 27 June and a by-election was held.

Rous married Mary Bradshaw, daughter of William Bradshaw of Lancashire and had a son Francis.

Parliament of England
Preceded by Not represented in Rump Parliament	Member of Parliament for Cornwall; 1653 – 1656; With: Robert Bennet 1653; Francis Langdon 1653; John Bawden 1653; Charles Boscawen 1654; Thomas Gewen 1654; James Launce 1654; Walter Moyle 1654–1656; Thomas Ceely 1654–1656; Richard Carter 1654-166; Anthony Nicholl 1654–1656; Francis Rous; William Braddon 1656; John St Aubin 1656	Succeeded by Hugh Boscawen; Francis Buller
