= Anthony Nicholl =

English politician

Anthony Nicholl MP, JP
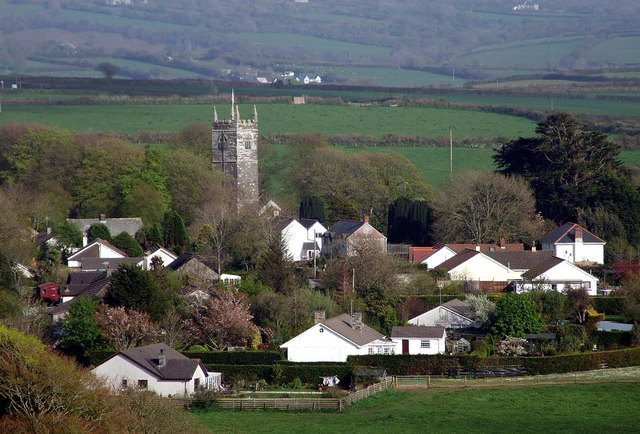
- St Tudy, Nicholl's birthplace

Sheriff of Cornwall
- In office 1656 – 1658 †

Member of Parliament for Cornwall 1654
- In office 1654 – 1658 †

Master of the Armoury
- In office 1648 – 1658 †

Member of Parliament for Bodmin
- In office 1640 – 1648 (suspended)

Member of Parliament for Bossiney
- In office April 1640 – May 1640

Personal details
- Born: 14 November 1611 Penvose, St Tudy, Cornwall
- Died: 20 February 1658 (aged 46) London, England
- Resting place: Savoy Chapel
- Spouse: Amey Speckett (1629–1685)
- Relations: John Pym (uncle)
- Children: 9
- Parent(s): Humphrey Nicoll (1577–1643); Philippa Rouse (died 1669)
- Occupation: Politician

Anthony Nicholl, (14 November 1611 to 20 February 1658), was an English politician from Cornwall. Prior to the outbreak of the Wars of the Three Kingdoms in 1639, he was closely associated with Parliamentarian leaders John Pym and John Hampden. A political moderate, following victory in the 1642 to 1646 First English Civil War, he was among the Eleven Members accused by senior Army officers in July 1647 of attempting to destabilise the kingdom.

Suspended in January 1648, he was restored, then expelled in Pride's Purge of December 1648. He returned to Parliament in 1654, and was appointed High Sheriff of Cornwall in 1656. He died in London on 20 February 1658.

== Personal details ==
Anthony Nicholl was born in Cornwall on 14 November 1611, one of numerous children of Humphrey Nicholl (1577–1643), a member of the Cornish gentry, and his wife Philippa Rouse (died 1669), half-sister to John Pym.

Anthony married Amey Speckett (1609–1685), whose family came from Thornbury, Devon; they had nine children, five sons and four daughters. After his death, she married another member of the local gentry, John Vivian.

== Career ==
Anthony's father Humphrey Nicholl was a close associate of William Coryton, leader of the opposition in Cornwall to the 1627 Forced Loan. A key stage in the struggle between Charles I and Parliament, this led to the institution of Personal Rule in 1629.

Both Humphrey and Anthony supported the Presbyterian faction in the House of Commons, led by John Pym. In April 1640, Nicholl was elected MP for Bossiney, which was dissolved by Charles in May. Following new elections in November 1640, he became MP for Bodmin, in the 1640 to 1660 Long Parliament.

John Pym nominated him as a Parliamentary observer at the trial of Strafford in March 1641. When the First English Civil War began in August 1642, unlike many of the Cornish gentry, the Nicholls backed Parliament. In September 1642, Francis Bassett, the Royalist Sheriff of Cornwall, expelled them and other supporters from the county.

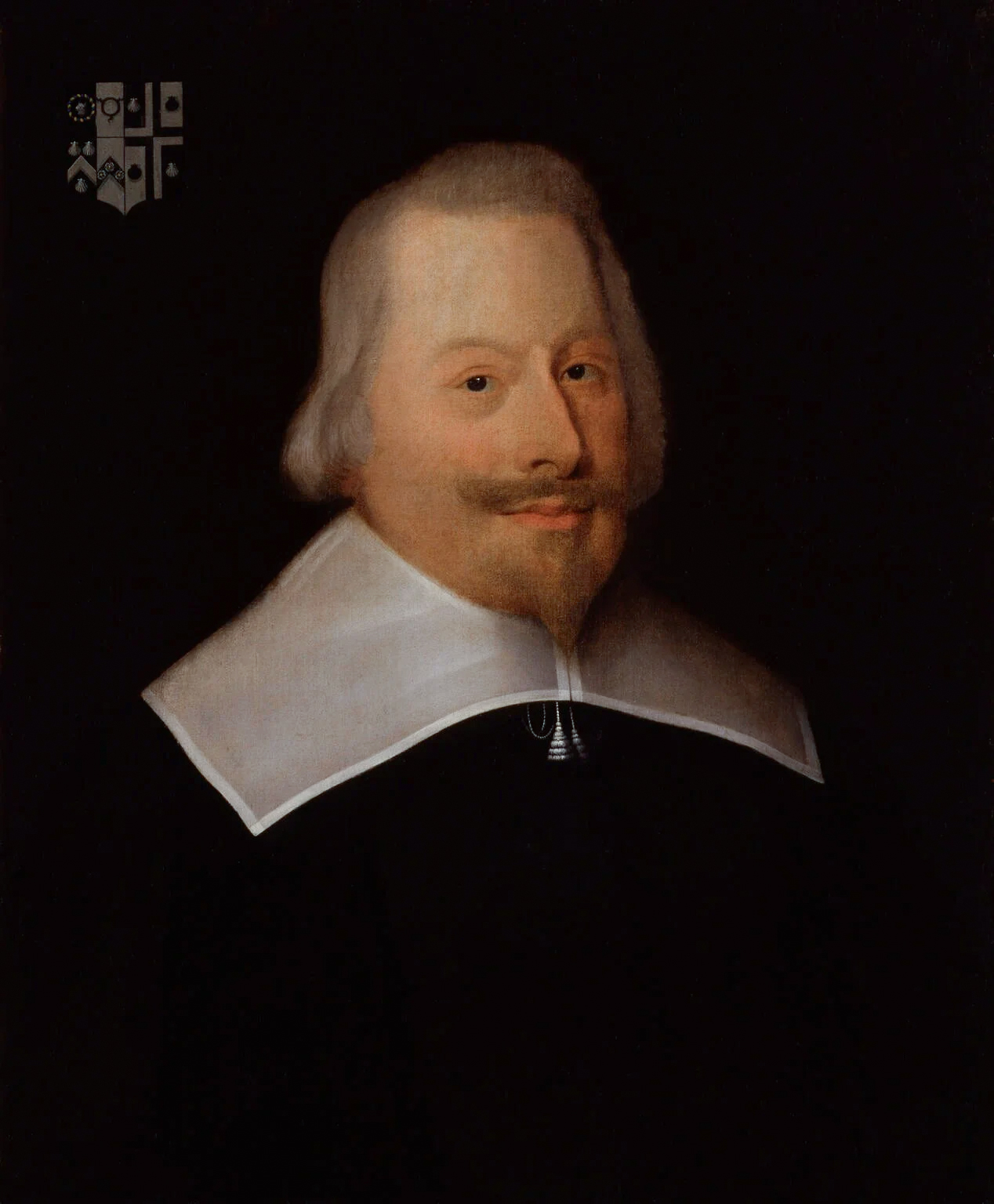
Nicholl's uncle, John Pym

In February 1643, Parliamentarians in Cornwall and Devon agreed a local truce with their Royalist opponents, causing outrage in London. Nicholl was sent to Exeter to warn his colleagues this was unacceptable, and no further agreements should be made. In May, he was present at the Battle of Stratton, a Royalist victory that ensured their control of the West Country. Nicholl's estates were occupied until the end of the war, and in June 1645, he received financial support from Parliament.

His close friend John Hampden died of wounds received at Chalgrove Field in June. Nicholl wrote; "Never Kingdom received a greater loss in one subject, never a man a truer and more faithful friend." His uncle John Pym died in December, while Stamford, Parliamentary commander at Stratton, filed charges against Nicholl, claiming blamed for his defeat. However, Nicholl successfully refuted these, and they were dismissed in May 1644.

In the political struggle that followed the end of the war in June 1646, he was a leader of the Parliamentary opposition to Oliver Cromwell. In July 1647, he was one of the Eleven Members impeached by senior Army officers of attempting to destabilise the kingdom. The Eleven withdrew from Parliament; unlike some of his colleagues, Nicholl received a pass to Cornwall, rather than abroad.

Arrested on 17 August on his way home, he was taken to New Model Army headquarters in Kingston upon Thames, but quietly allowed to escape a few days later. Parliamentary proceedings to impeach the Eleven Members were suspended when the Second English Civil War began in February, then abandoned in June. As a gesture of reconciliation, Nicholl was given the sinecure of Master of the Armoury.

Defeat in the Second English Civil War broke the power of the Presbyterian opposition, and Nicholl was among those expelled by Pride's Purge in 1648. He later reconciled with the new regime; in 1654, he was returned as one of the MPs for Cornwall, then re-elected in 1656. During the Rule of the Major-Generals from 1655 to 1657, he was one of 12 advisors for the South-West. He was appointed High Sheriff of Cornwall in 1657, and provided regular updates to John Thurloe, head of intelligence under the Protectorate.

In February 1658, Nicholl died in London, and buried in the graveyard attached to the Savoy Chapel. In 1681, his wife erected a family memorial in St Uda, parish church of St Tudy in Cornwall; in addition to her husband and herself, it includes four sons who died between 1649 and 1678.

== Sources ==
- Adair, John (1979). "The Death of John Hampden". History Today. 29 (10).
- Aylmer, GE (1974). Interregnum: The Quest for Settlement, 1646–60. Palgrave Macmillan. ISBN 978-0333174739.
- Cust, Richard (1985). "Charles I, the Privy Council, and the Forced Loan". British Studies. 24 (2): 208–235. doi:10.1086/385832. JSTOR 175703. S2CID 143537267.
- Duffin, Anne (2008). "Nicoll, Anthony". Oxford Dictionary of National Biography (online ed.). Oxford University Press. doi:10.1093/ref:odnb/20172. (Subscription, Wikipedia Library access or UK public library membership required.)
- Fuller-Eliott-Drake, Lady Elizabeth (1911). The family and heirs of Sir Francis Drake. Smith Elder.
- Hopper, Andrew (2008). "Grey, Henry, first earl of Stamford". Oxford Dictionary of National Biography (online ed.). Oxford University Press. doi:10.1093/ref:odnb/11537. (Subscription, Wikipedia Library access or UK public library membership required.)
- Hutton, Ronald (2003). The Royalist War Effort 1642-1646. Routledge. ISBN 978-0415305402.
- Thrush, Andrew; Ferris, John, eds. (2010). NICOLL, Humphrey (1577–1643), of Penvose, St. Tudy, Cornw. in The History of Parliament: the House of Commons 1604–1629. CUP. ISBN 978-1107002258.
- Willis, Browne (1750). Notitia Parliamentaria, Or, An History of the Counties, Cities, and Boroughs in England and Wales; Part II. Willis.

Parliament of England
Vacant Parliament suspended since 1629	Member of Parliament for Bossiney; 1640 (April); With: Edward Herle	Succeeded by Sir John Clotworthy; Sir Christopher Yelverton, 1st Baronet
Preceded by Richard Prideaux; Sir Richard Wynn, 2nd Baronet	Member of Parliament for Bodmin; 1640–1648; With: John Arundell 1640; Thomas Waller 1648	Not represented in Rump Parliament
Preceded by Robert Bennet; Francis Langdon; Anthony Rous; John Bawden	Member of Parliament for Cornwall; 1654–1656; With: Charles Boscawen 1654; Thomas Gewen 1654; James Launce 1654; Anthony Rous 1654–1656; Thomas Ceely 1654–1656; Richard Carter 1654–166; Walter Moyle 1654–1656; Anthony Rous 1656; William Braddon 1656; John St Aubin 1656	Succeeded by Hugh Boscawen; Francis Buller
