= Bake, Cornwall =

Hamlet in Cornwall, England

Coordinates: 50.4011°N 4.3657°W

Bake: Cornish: Pobas
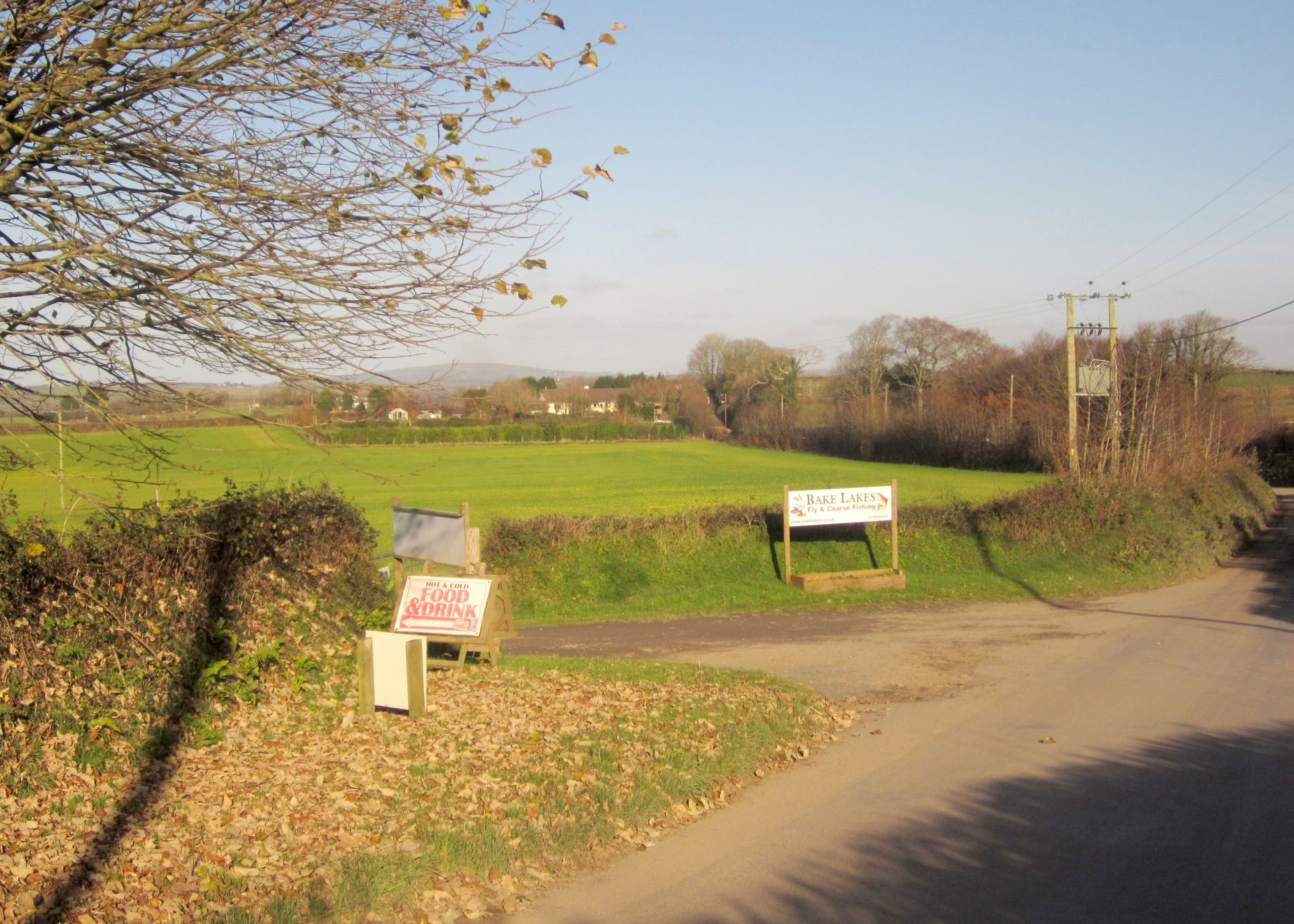

- Location within Cornwall
- OS grid reference: SX 321 585
- Civil parish: Deviock
- Unitary authority: Cornwall
- Ceremonial county: Cornwall
- Region: South West
- Country: England
- Sovereign state: United Kingdom
- Post town: SALTASH
- Postcode district: PL12
- Dialling code: 01503
- Police: Devon and Cornwall
- Fire: Cornwall
- Ambulance: South Western
- UK Parliament: South East Cornwall

Bake (Cornish: Pobas) is a hamlet in the civil parish of Deviock, in south-east Cornwall, England, United Kingdom. It is 5 kilometres (3.1 mi) west of St Germans at grid reference SX 321 585, 1 kilometre (0.62 mi) south-west of the A38/A374 Trerulefoot roundabout.

Bake is the seat of the Moyle family (although Bake itself is in the civil parish of Deviock) and St German's Priory has a mortuary chapel for the Moyle family of Bake.

West of the manor house, a steep tree-lined valley called Bake Wood runs down to the River Seaton. At the top of the valley, seven artificial lakes are commercially operated as Bake Fishing Lakes providing coarse fishing and fly fishing.

There is also a place called Bake in the civil parish of Pelynt.

== See also ==
- Bake Fishing Lakes
