= Buller =

Buller is an English surname. It may refer to:

== People ==
- Anthony Buller (1613–1679), English soldier and Member of Parliament
- Sir Anthony Buller (1780–1866), English lawyer and Member of Parliament
- Arthur Henry Reginald Buller (1874–1944), British/Canadian mycologist
- Charles Buller (1806–1848), English politician
- David Buller (born 1959), American philosopher of science
- Sir Edward Buller, 1st Baronet (1764–1824)
- Ed Buller, British musician
- Eric Buller (1894–1973), cricketer and British army officer
- Francesca Buller (b. 1964), British actress
- Francis Buller (Parliamentarian) English politician
- Francis Buller (died 1682) (c 1630–1682), English politician
- Sir Francis Buller, 1st Baronet (1746–1800)
- Frederick Howard Buller (1914–1994), Canadian aeronautical engineer, sailboat designer
- George Buller (MP) (1607–c. 1646), English politician
- Sir George Buller (1802–1884), British Army General
- Georgiana Buller (1884–1953), British hospital administrator
- Hy Buller (1926–1968), Canadian ice hockey player
- James Buller (the younger) (c. 1729–1765), British politician
- James Wentworth Buller (1798–1865), British politician
- Joe Buller (1909–1986), English footballer
- John Buller (politician, born 1632) MP (1632–1716), English politician
- John Buller (politician, born 1721) (1721–1786), British MP for East Looe
- John Buller (politician, born 1745) (1745–1793), MP for Exeter, Launceston, and West Looe
- John Buller (composer) (1927–2004), British composer
- Jon Buller (born 1970), Canadian musician
- Marion Buller, Canadian judge
- Redvers Buller (1839–1908), British soldier
- Sir Richard Buller (1578–1642), Parliamentarian
- Syd Buller (1909–1970), English Test cricket umpire
- Walter Buller (1838–1906), New Zealand ornithologist
- Lt. Col. Walter Buller (bridge) (1887–1938), British bridge player
- William Buller (bishop), theologian and churchman
- William Buller (racing driver) (born 1992), British racing driver

== Places ==
Australia

- Mount Buller (Victoria)
- Mount Buller, Victoria, a resort town on the mountain of the same name

New Zealand

- Buller (New Zealand electorate)
- Buller District
- Buller Gorge
- Buller River

== Other uses ==
- Buller, nickname of the Bullingdon Club, a student dining club at Oxford University

== See also ==
- Buller baronets, a British title
- Sir James Buller East, 2nd Baronet (1798–1878), British MP for Winchester
- Baron Churston
- Eliza Manningham-Buller
- Viscount Dilhorne
- John Yarde-Buller, 1st Baron Churston
