= Francis Buller =

Francis Buller may refer to:

- Francis Buller (died 1682) (1630–1682)
- Francis Buller (Parliamentarian)
- Francis Buller (politician) (1723–1764), MP for West Looe
- Sir Francis Buller, 1st Baronet (1746–1800), judge
- Sir Francis Buller-Yarde-Buller, 2nd Baronet (1767–1833), of the Buller baronets
- Francis Alexander Waddilove Buller (1879–1943), British Royal Navy officer

== See also ==
- Buller (disambiguation)
