= Exhibition of 1769 =

Exhibition of 1769 may refer to two art exhibitions held in London

- Royal Academy Exhibition of 1769, held in Pall Mall
- Society of Artists Exhibition of 1769, held in Spring Gardens

== See also ==
- Salon of 1769, held the same year at the Louvre in Paris
