= Baron Hawke =

Barony in the Peerage of Great Britain

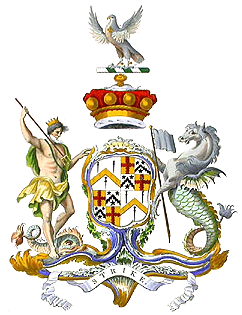
The coat of arms of the Barons Hawke, as used in the family memorial of 1781.

Baron Hawke, "of Towton" in the County of York, is a title in the Peerage of Great Britain. It was created on 20 May 1776 for Admiral Sir Edward Hawke (of Scarthingwell Hall in the parish of Towton), responsible for a blockade of all French merchant shipping and the grounding of six French ships, and scattering of the rest, at the Battle of Quiberon Bay. The battle followed an earlier British victory at the Battle of Lagos off the coast of Portugal by a fleet under another admiral's command.

The year, 1759, was dubbed for Britain its Annus Mirabilis, or 'miracle year', as France could not follow up on clear victory in the Battle of Sainte-Foy just before the Siege of Quebec for want of reinforcements and supplies from France, and its crippled trade triggered a credit crunch. Hawke's naval conduct then and later as Lord Admiral proved to establish British naval supremacy and in the immediate term determined the fate of New France and hence Canada.

His son, the second Baron, represented Saltash in the House of Commons for the six years until his father died. His son, the third Baron, assumed the additional surname of Harvey. The fifth Baron succeeded his elder brother in 1869 and in the next year was succeeded by his first cousin, the sixth Baron. He was the son of Hon. Martin Bladen Edward Hawke (Jnr). His son, the seventh Baron, an exceptional cricketer, became the England cricket team captain. On his death the title passed to his younger brother, the eighth Baron. His elder son, the ninth Baron, was one of six to eight co-serving Lords whips in the third Churchill ministry and two following Conservative ministries until 1964. He was succeeded by his younger brother, the tenth Baron, whose son then became the 11th Baron on his death. As of 2017, the title is held by the 12th Baron, who succeeded his father in 2009.

The family seat is The Old Mill House, near Cuddington, Cheshire.

== Barons Hawke (1776) ==
- Edward Hawke, 1st Baron Hawke (1705–1781)
- Martin Bladen Hawke, 2nd Baron Hawke (1744–1805)
- Edward Hawke-Harvey, 3rd Baron Hawke (1774–1824)
- Edward William Hawke-Harvey, 4th Baron Hawke (1799–1869)
- Stanhope Hawke-Harvey, 5th Baron Hawke (1804–1870)
- Edward Henry Julius Hawke, 6th Baron Hawke (1815–1887)
- Martin Bladen Hawke, 7th Baron Hawke (1860–1938)
- Edward Julian Hawke, 8th Baron Hawke (1873–1939)
- Bladen Wilmer Hawke, 9th Baron Hawke (1901–1985)
- Julian Stanhope Theodore Hawke, 10th Baron Hawke (1904–1992)
- Edward George Hawke, 11th Baron Hawke (1950–2009)
- William Martin Theodore Hawke, 12th Baron Hawke (born 1995)

There is currently no heir to the barony.

=== Title succession chart ===
Title succession chart, Barons Hawke.

Edward Hawke; 1st Baron Hawke; 1705–1781
Martin Hawke; 2nd Baron Hawke; 1744–1805
Edward Hawke-Harvey; 3rd Baron Hawke; 1774–1824	Hon. Martin Hawke; 1777–1839
Edward Hawke-Harvey; 4th Baron Hawke; 1799–1869	Stanhope Hawke-Harvey; 5th Baron Hawke; 1804–1870	Hon. Martin Hawke-Harvey; 1806–1857	Edward Hawke; 6th Baron Hawke; 1815–1887
Hon. Edward Hawke; 1859–1871	Martin Hawke; 7th Baron Hawke; 1860–1938	Adm. Hon. Stanhope Hawke; 1863–1936	Hon. Bladen Hawke; 1865–1875	Hon. Harold Hawke; 1867–1913	Edward Hawke; 8th Baron Hawke; 1873–1939
Bladen Hawke; 9th Baron Hawke; 1901–1985	Julian Hawke; 10th Baron Hawke; 1904–1992
Edward Hawke; 11th Baron Hawke; 1950–2009
William Hawke; 12th Baron Hawke born 1995

== Coat of arms ==
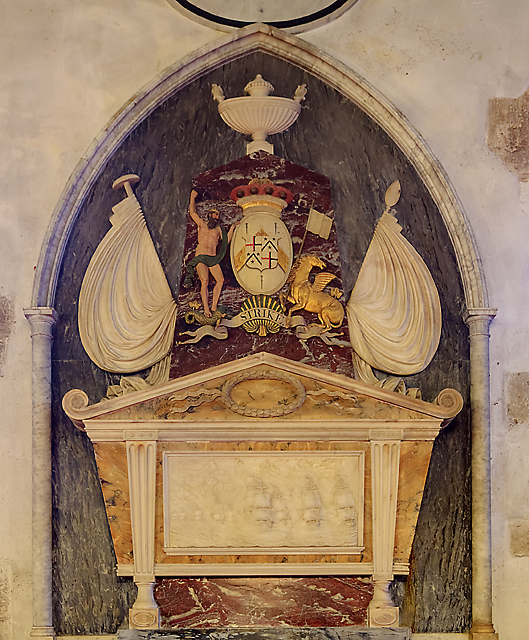
Monument to Admiral Lord Hawke, St Nicolas church, North Stoneham, showing the arms of Hawke (Argent, a chevron erminois between three boatswain's whistles purple), with inescutcheon of pretence of Brooke, for his heiress wife

- Arms, as quartered by the descendants of Admiral Lord Hawke: Quarterly 1st and 4th argent, a chevron erminois between three boatswain's whistles purple (Hawke), 2nd and 3rd grand-quarter quarterly, 1st and 4th or, a cross engrailed gules (Brooke), 2nd and 3rd argent, a chevron engrailed sable, three mullets sable (a Brooke heiress).
- Crest: A hawk rising ermine, beaked, belled and charged on the breast with a fleur-de-lis or.
- Supporters: Dexter, Neptune, his mantle of a sea-green colour, edged argent, crowned with an eastern coronet or, his dexter arm erect, darting downwards, his trident sable, headed silver, resting his sinister foot on a dolphin proper; sinister, a seahorse or, sustaining in his forefins a banner argent, the staff broken proper.
- Motto: Strike.
