= Martin Hawke =

Martin Hawke may refer to:

- Martin Hawke, 7th Baron Hawke, English cricketer
- Martin Hawke, 2nd Baron Hawke, British peer and politician
