= The Bradshaw Family =

Painting by Johann Zoffany

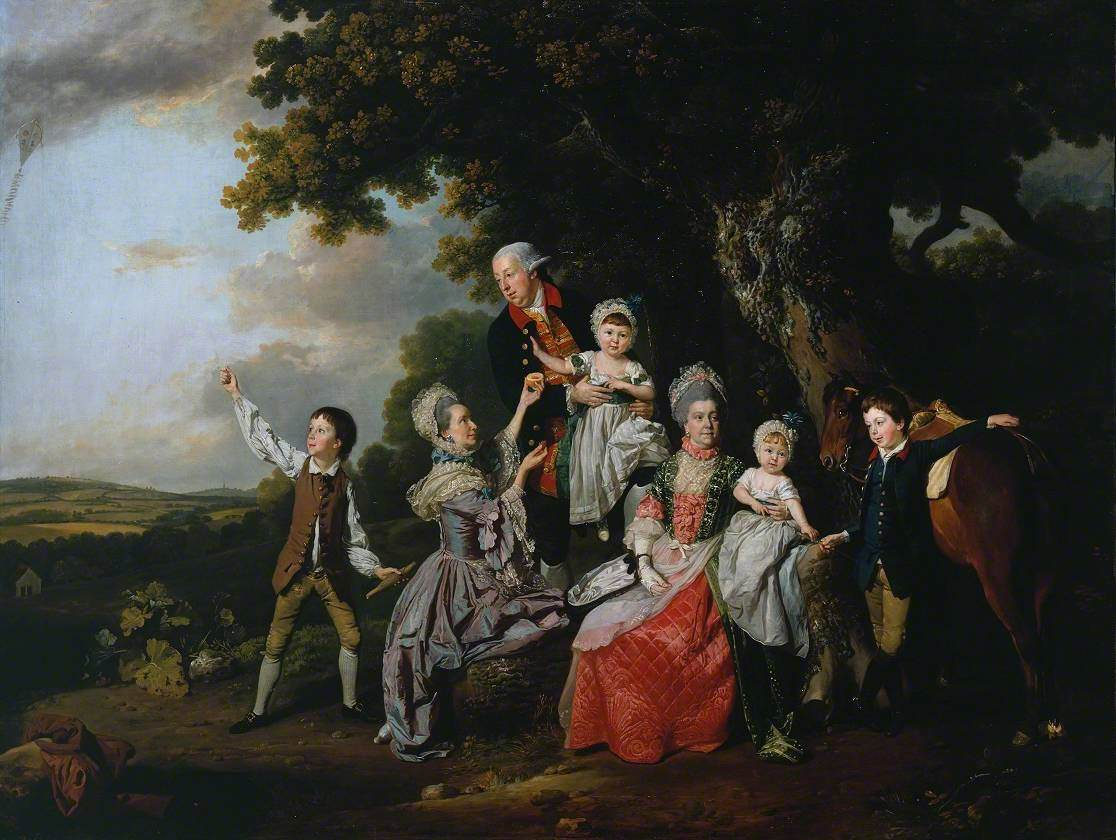
- Artist: Johan Zoffany
- Year: 1769
- Type: Oil on canvas, portrait painting
- Dimensions: 176.3 cm × 133.9 cm (69.4 in × 52.7 in)
- Location: Tate Britain; London

The Bradshaw Family is an oil on canvas portrait painting by the German-British artist Johan Zoffany, from 1769.

== History and description ==
It depicts a group portrait of the politician Thomas Bradshaw and his family including his wife Elizabeth and son Robert Haldane Bradshaw who would later also go into politics. Bradshaw was at the time serving as Member of Parliament for Saltash and was private secretary to the Prime Minister the Duke of Grafton. Zoffany developed a reputation for producing these conversation pieces. The painting features a pyramid composition that Zoffany often used, with Thomas Bradshaw at the apex, his wife and sister either side of him and his two eldest sons at the flanks.

The painting was shown at the Society of Artists of Great Britain's Exhibition of 1769 at Spring Gardens in London. Today it is in the collection of the Tate Britain in Pimlico, having been acquired in 1955.

== See also ==
- The Sharp Family, a 1781 painting by Zoffany featuring another large family grouping

== Bibliography ==
- Hayes, John. The Portrait in British Art: Masterpieces Bought with the Help of the National Art Collections Fund. National Portrait Gallery, 1991.
- Paulson, Ronald. Emblem and Expression: Meaning in English Art of the Eighteenth Century. Harvard University Press, 1975.
- Treadwell, Penelope. Johan Zoffany: Artist and Adventurer. Paul Holberton, 2009.
- Webster, Mary. Johan Zoffany, 1733-1810. National Portrait Gallery, 1976.
