= Edward Hyde, 1st Earl of Clarendon =

English politician and historian (1609–1674)

The Right Honourable The Earl of Clarendon PC JP
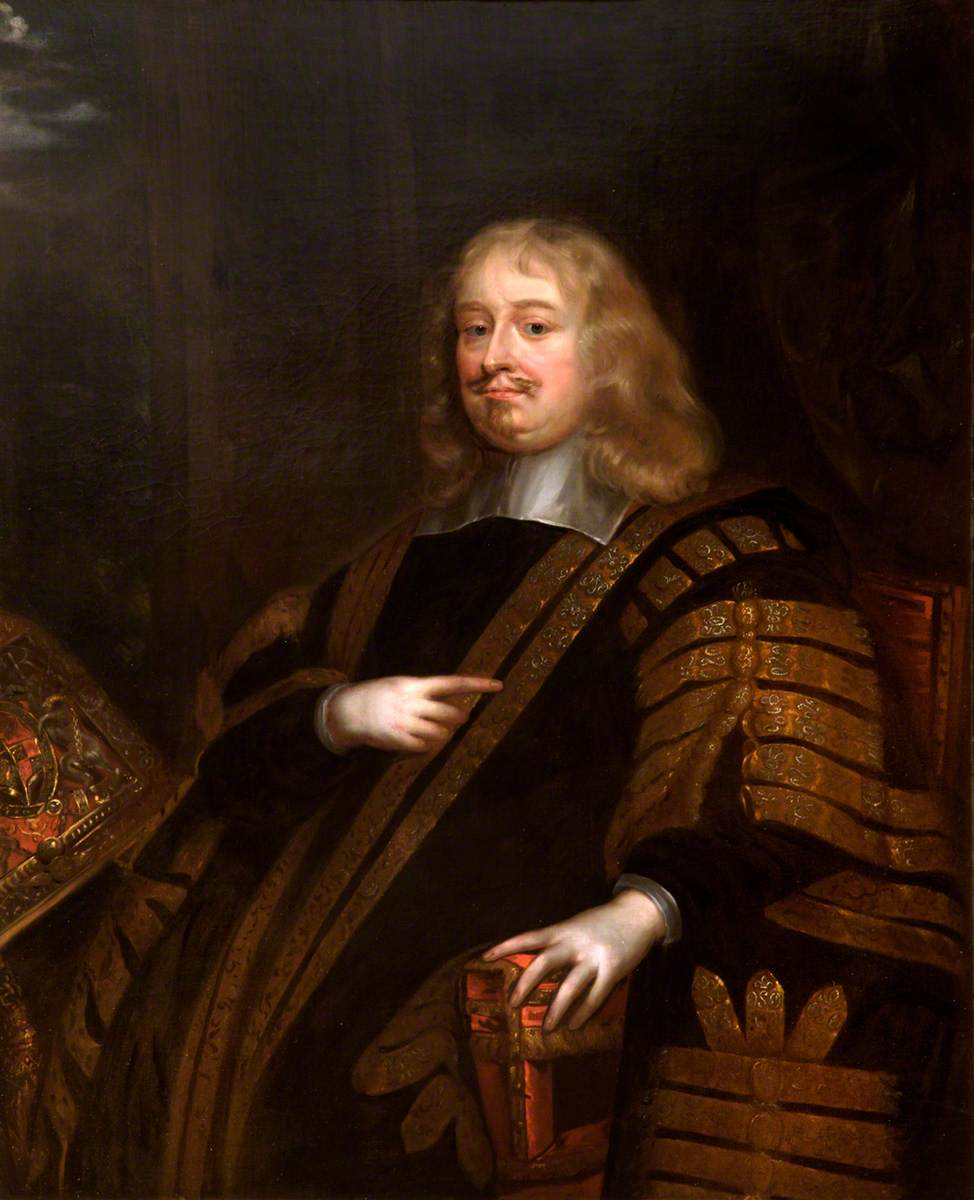
- Portrait by Peter Lely

Lord Chancellor
- In office 13 January 1658 – 30 August 1667
- Monarch: Charles II of England
- Preceded by: Vacant (last held by Sir Edward Herbert)
- Succeeded by: Orlando Bridgeman (Lord Keeper of the Great Seal)

First Lord of the Treasury
- In office 19 June 1660 – 8 September 1660
- Preceded by: Francis Cottington (Lord High Treasurer)
- Succeeded by: Thomas Wriothesley

Chancellor, University of Oxford
- In office 1660–1667

Member of the Long Parliament for Saltash
- In office November 1640 – August 1642 (disbarred)

Member of the Short Parliament for Wootton Bassett
- In office April 1640 – May 1640

Personal details
- Born: 18 February 1609 Dinton, Wiltshire, England
- Died: 9 December 1674 (aged 65) Rouen, France
- Resting place: Westminster Abbey
- Spouses: Anne Ayliffe (m. 1629; died 1629) Frances Aylesbury (m. 1634; died 1667)
- Relations: Mary II of England (granddaughter); Anne, Queen of Great Britain (granddaughter)
- Children: Henry Hyde, 2nd Earl of Clarendon; Laurence Hyde, 1st Earl of Rochester; Edward Hyde; James Hyde; Anne, Duchess of York; Frances Keightley
- Parent(s): Henry Hyde; Mary Langford
- Education: Hertford College, Oxford
- Occupation: Statesman; lawyer; diplomat; historian

Edward Hyde, 1st Earl of Clarendon (18 February 1609 – 9 December 1674) was an English statesman, lawyer, diplomat and historian who served as chief adviser to Charles I during the First English Civil War, and Lord Chancellor to Charles II from 1660 to 1667.

Hyde largely avoided involvement in the political disputes of the 1630s until elected to the Long Parliament in November 1640. Like many moderates he felt attempts by Charles I to rule without Parliament had gone too far, but by 1642 felt Parliament's leaders were, in turn, seeking too much power. A devout believer in an Episcopalian Church of England, his opposition to Puritan attempts to reform it drove much of his policy over the next two decades. He joined Charles in York shortly before the First English Civil War began in August 1642, and initially served as his senior political advisor. However, as the war turned against the Royalists, his rejection of attempts to build alliances with Scots Covenanters or Irish Catholics led to a decline in his influence.

In 1644, the King's son, the future Charles II, was placed in command of the West Country, with Hyde and his close friend Sir Ralph Hopton as part of his Governing Council. When the Royalists surrendered in June 1646, Hyde went into exile with the younger Charles, who (from the royalist perspective) became king after his father's execution in January 1649. Hyde avoided participation in the Second or Third English Civil War, for both involved alliances with Scots and English Presbyterians; instead he served as a diplomat in Paris and Madrid. After the Restoration in 1660, Charles II appointed him Lord Chancellor and Earl of Clarendon, while Hyde's daughter Anne married the future James II, making him grandfather of two queens regnant, Mary II and Anne.

Lord Clarendon's links to the King brought him both power and enemies, while Charles became increasingly irritated by his criticism. Despite having limited responsibility for the disastrous Second Anglo-Dutch War (1665–1667), Clarendon was charged with treason and forced into permanent exile. He lived in continental Europe until his death in 1674; during this period he completed The History of the Rebellion, now regarded as one of the most significant histories of the 1642-to-1646 civil war. First written as a defence of Charles I, it was extensively revised after 1667 and became far more critical and franker, particularly in its assessments of his contemporaries.

== Personal details ==
Edward Hyde was born on 18 February 1609, at Dinton, Wiltshire, sixth of nine children and third son of Henry Hyde and Mary Langford. His father and two of his uncles were lawyers; although Henry retired after his marriage, Nicholas Hyde became Lord Chief Justice, Lawrence was legal advisor to Anne of Denmark, wife of James I. Educated at Gillingham School, in 1622 Hyde was admitted to Hertford College, Oxford, then known as Magdalen Hall, graduating in 1626. He was originally intended for a career in the Church of England, but the death of his elder brothers left him as his father's heir, and instead, he entered the Middle Temple to study law.

He married twice, first in 1629 to Anne Ayliffe, who died six months later from smallpox, then to Frances Aylesbury in 1634. They had six children who survived infancy: Henry (1638–1709), Laurence (1642–1711), Edward (1645–1665), James (1650–1681), Anne (1637–1671), and Frances, who married Thomas Keightley. As mother of two queens, Anne is the best remembered, but both Henry and Laurence had significant political careers, the latter being "an exceptionally able politician".

== Career ==
=== Before 1640 ===
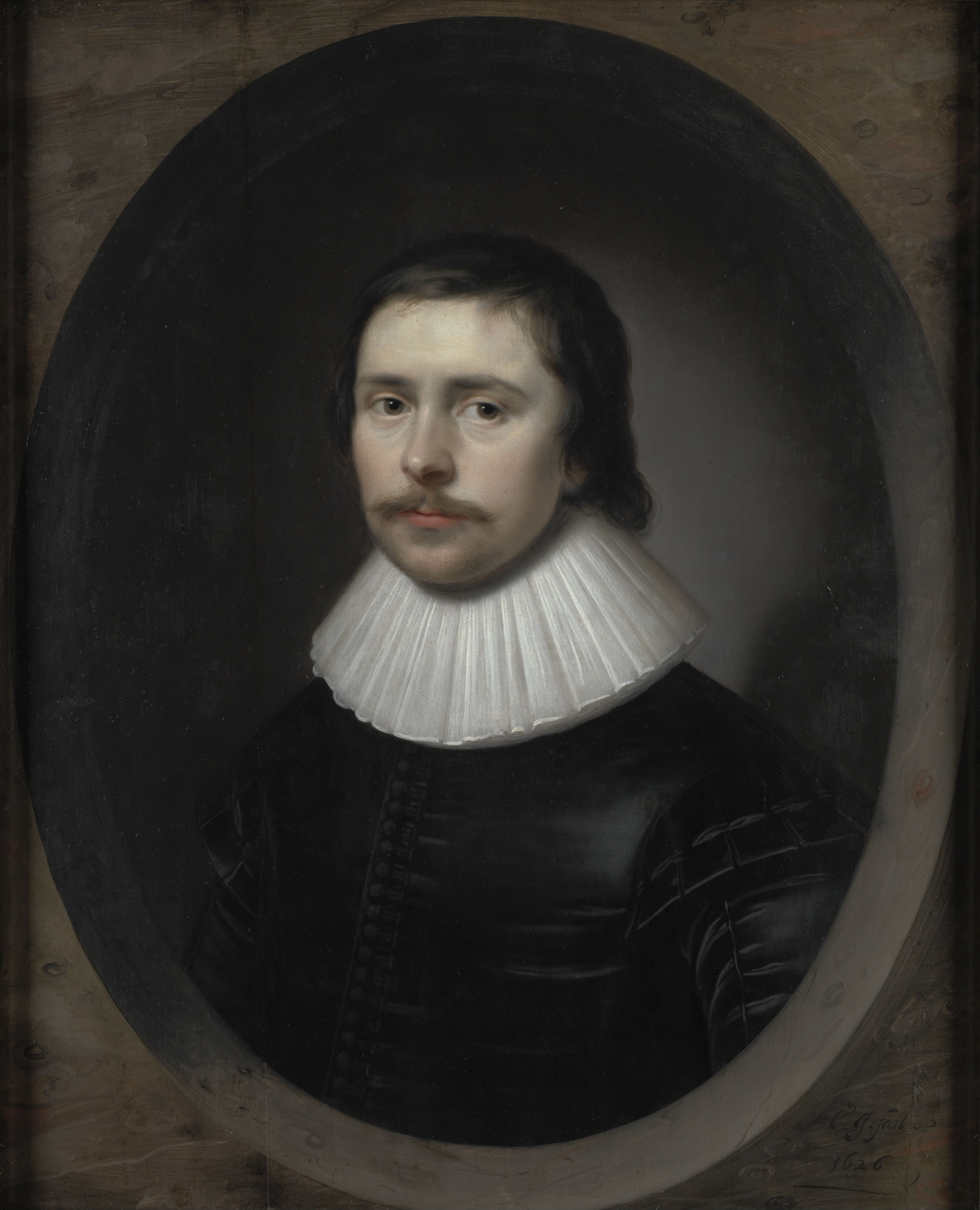
Edward Hyde in 1626, aged 17, by Cornelis Janssens van Ceulen

Hyde later admitted he had limited interest in a legal career, and declared that "next the immediate blessing and providence of God Almighty" he "owed all the little he knew and the little good that was in him to the friendships and conversation ... of the most excellent men in their several kinds that lived in that age." These included Ben Jonson, John Selden, Edmund Waller, John Hales and especially Lord Falkland, who became his best friend.

Hyde was one of the most prominent members of the famous Great Tew Circle, a group of intellectuals who gathered at Lord Falkland's country house Great Tew in Oxfordshire.

On 22 November 1633 he was called to the bar and obtained quickly a good position and practice; "you may have great joy of your son Ned" his uncle the Attorney General assured his father. Both his marriages gained him influential friends, and in December 1634 he was made keeper of the writs and rolls of the Court of Common Pleas. His able conduct of the petition of the London merchants against Lord Treasurer Portland earned him the approval of Archbishop William Laud, with whom he developed a friendship, though Laud did not make friends easily and his religious views were very different from Hyde's. Hyde in his History explained that he admired Laud for his integrity and decency and excused his notorious rudeness and bad temper, partly because of Laud's humble origins and partly because Hyde recognised the same weaknesses in himself.

=== 1640 to 1660 ===
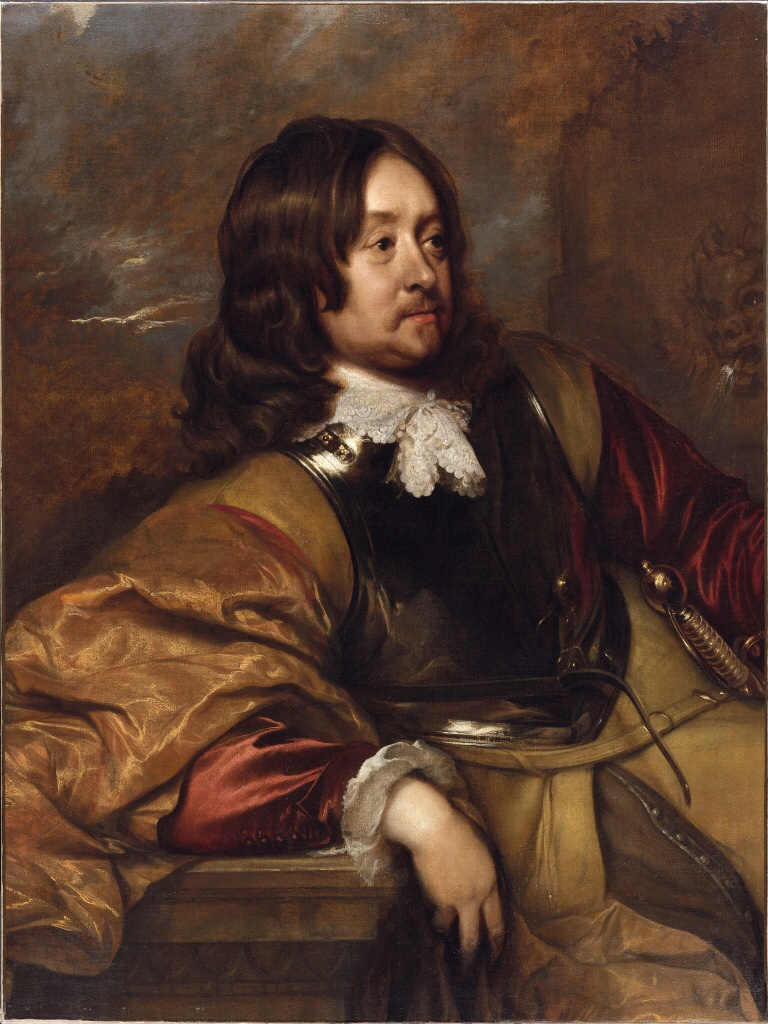
Edward Hyde by William Dobson, circa 1643

In April 1640, Hyde was elected Member of Parliament for both Shaftesbury and Wootton Bassett in the Short Parliament and chose to sit for Wootton Bassett. In November 1640 he was elected MP for Saltash in the Long Parliament, Hyde was at first a moderate critic of King Charles I, but became more supportive of the King after he began to accept reforming bills from Parliament. Hyde opposed legislation restricting the power of the King to appoint his own advisors, viewing it as unnecessary and an affront to the royal prerogative. He gradually moved over towards the royalist side, championing the Church of England and opposing the execution of the Earl of Strafford, Charles's primary adviser. Following the Grand Remonstrance of 1641, Hyde became an informal adviser to the King. He left London about 20 May 1642 and rejoined the King at York. In February 1643, Hyde was knighted and was officially appointed to the Privy Council; the following month he was made Chancellor of the Exchequer.

Despite his own previous opposition to the King, he found it hard to forgive anyone, even a friend, who fought for Parliament, and he severed many personal friendships as a result. With the possible exception of John Pym, he detested all the Parliamentarian leaders, describing Oliver Cromwell as "a brave bad man" and John Hampden as a hypocrite, while Oliver St. John's "foxes and wolves" speech, in favour of the attainder of Strafford, he considered to be the depth of barbarism. His view of the conflict and of his opponents was undoubtedly coloured by the death of his best friend Lucius Cary, 2nd Viscount Falkland at the First Battle of Newbury in September 1643. Hyde mourned his death, which he called "a loss most infamous and execrable to all posterity", to the end of his own life.

In 1644, the Royalist-controlled West Country was created a separate government under the Prince of Wales, with Hyde appointed to his General Council; this was partly intended by his opponents as a way to remove him from access to the King. Hyde found it difficult to control his military commanders, notably George Goring, Lord Goring, who, although a brave and capable cavalry general, often refused to follow orders and whose ill-disciplined troops gained a reputation for looting and drunkenness. He described Goring as a man who would "without hesitation have broken any trust, or performed any act of treachery ... Of all his qualifications, dissimulation was his masterpiece; in which he so much excelled, that men were not ordinarily ashamed or out of countenance, in being but twice deceived by him".

After the Royalist defeat, Hyde fled to Jersey in 1646; his opposition to alliances with the Scots meant he was not closely involved with the 1648 Second English Civil War, which resulted in the execution of Charles I in January 1649. Despite their differences, he was horrified by the execution; he later described Charles as a man who had an excellent understanding but was not sufficiently confident of it himself, so that he often changed his opinion for a worse one, and "would follow the advice of a man who did not judge as well as himself".

During this period Hyde began writing The History of the Rebellion, but following defeat in the Third English Civil War in 1651, he resumed his position as advisor to Charles II and was appointed Lord Chancellor on 13 January 1658. He also employed his sister Susanna as a Royalist agent; arrested in 1656, she was held in Lambeth Palace prison, where she died soon afterward. Although other female spies are mentioned in his History, she does not appear.

=== 1660 to 1667 ===
After the Stuart Restoration in 1660, he returned to England and became even closer to the royal family through the marriage of his daughter Anne to the King's brother James, Duke of York. Contemporaries naturally assumed that Hyde had arranged the royal marriage of his daughter, but modern historians, in general, accept his repeated claims that he had no hand in it, and that indeed it came as an unwelcome shock to him. He is supposed to have told Anne that he would rather see her dead than to so disgrace her family.

There were good reasons for his opposition, since he may have hoped to arrange a marriage for James with a foreign princess, and he was well aware that nobody regarded his daughter as a suitable royal match, a view Clarendon shared. On the personal level, he seems to have disliked James, whose impulsive attempt to repudiate the marriage can hardly have endeared him to his father-in-law. Anne enforced the rules of etiquette governing such marriages with great strictness, and thus caused her parents some social embarrassment: as commoners, they were not permitted to sit down in Anne's presence, or to refer to her as their daughter. As Cardinal Mazarin remarked, the marriage damaged Hyde's reputation as a politician, whether he was responsible for it or not. On 3 November 1660, he was raised to the peerage as Baron Hyde, of Hindon in the County of Wiltshire, and on 20 April the next year, at the coronation, he was created Viscount Cornbury and Earl of Clarendon. He served as Chancellor of the University of Oxford from 1660 to 1667.

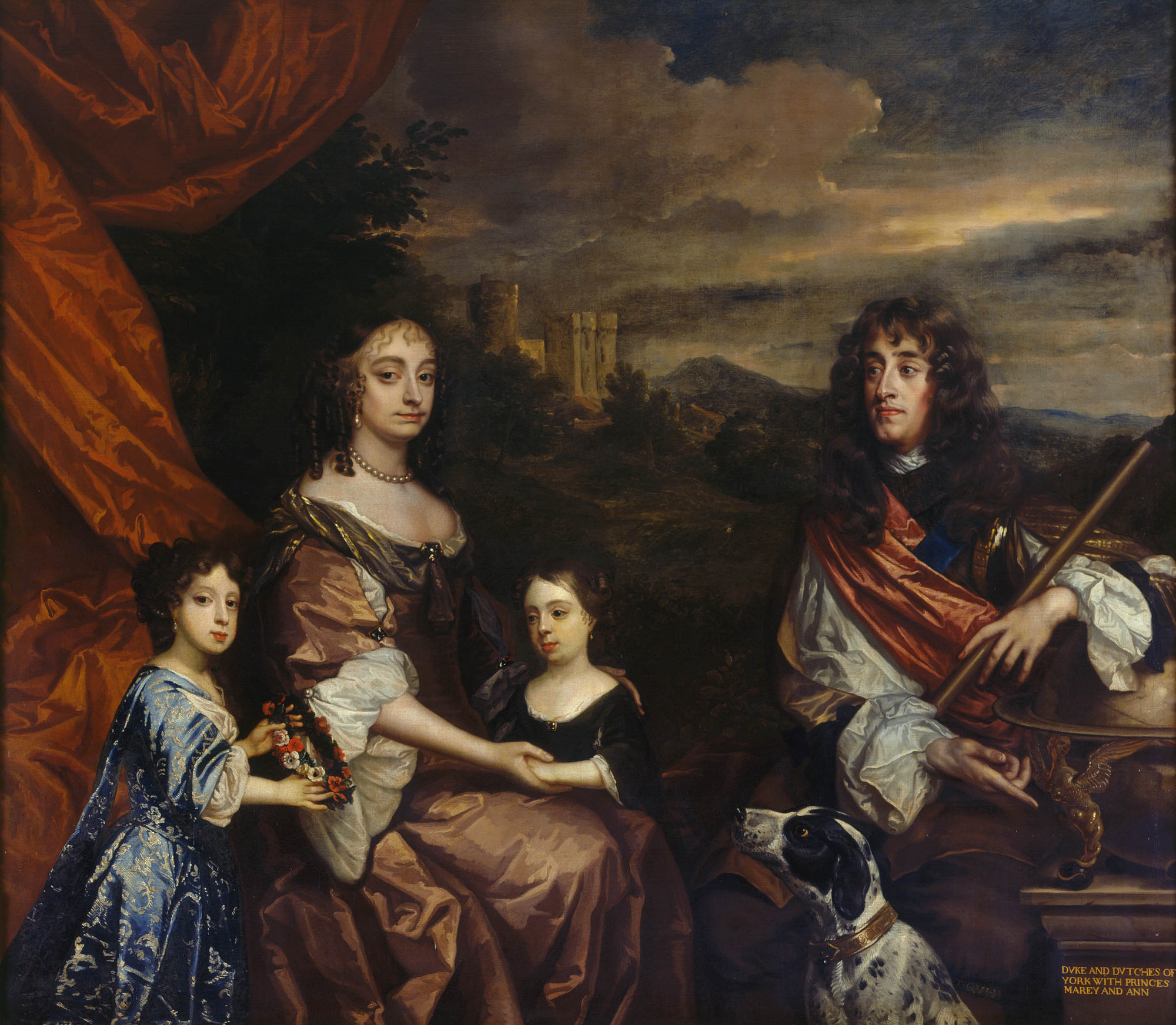
Hyde's daughter Anne, James and their two daughters, Lady Mary and Lady Anne; these links brought power and enemies

As effective chief minister in the early years of the reign, he accepted the need to fulfil most of what had been promised in the Declaration of Breda, which he had partly drafted. In particular, he worked hard to fulfil the promise of mercy to all the King's enemies, except the regicides, and this was largely achieved in the Act of Indemnity and Oblivion. Most other problems he was content to leave to Parliament, and in particular to the restored House of Lords; his speech welcoming the Lords' return shows his ingrained dislike of democracy.

He played a key role in Charles' marriage to Catherine of Braganza, with ultimately harmful consequences to himself. Clarendon liked and admired the Queen, and disapproved of the King's openly maintaining his mistresses. The King, however, resented any interference with his private life. Catherine's failure to bear children also was damaging to Clarendon, given the nearness of his own grandchildren to the throne, although it is most unlikely, as was alleged, that Clarendon had planned deliberately for Charles to marry an infertile bride. He and Catherine remained on friendly terms; one of his last letters thanked her for her kindness to his family.

As Lord Chancellor, it is commonly thought that Clarendon was the author of the "Clarendon Code", designed to preserve the supremacy of the Church of England. In reality, he was not very heavily involved with its drafting and actually disapproved of much of its content. The "Great Tew Circle" of which he had been a leading member prided itself on tolerance and respect for religious differences. The code was thus merely named after him as chief minister.

In 1663, he was one of eight Lords Proprietor given title to a huge tract of land in North America which became the Province of Carolina. Shortly after this, an attempt was made to impeach him by George Digby, 2nd Earl of Bristol, a longstanding political opponent from the Civil War. He was accused of arranging for Charles to marry a woman he knew to be barren in order to secure the throne for the children of his daughter Anne, while Clarendon House, his palatial new mansion in Piccadilly, was cited as evidence of corruption. He was also blamed for the Sale of Dunkirk, and the cost of supporting the colony of Tangiers, acquired along with Bombay as part of Catherine's dowry. The windows of Clarendon House were broken, and a placard fixed to the house blaming Hyde for "Dunkirk, Tangiers and a barren Queen".

While these allegations were not taken seriously, and ended by damaging Bristol more than Hyde, he became increasingly unpopular with the public and with Charles, whom he subjected to frequent lectures on his shortcomings. His contempt for Charles' mistress Barbara Villiers, Duchess of Cleveland, earned him her enmity, and she worked with the future members of the Cabal ministry to destroy him.

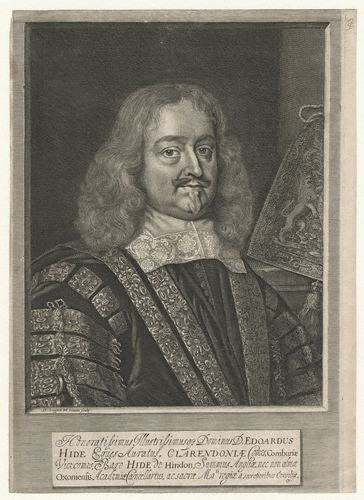
The Earl of Clarendon; 1666 engraving by David Loggan

His authority was weakened by increasing ill-health, in particular attacks of gout and back pain that became so severe that he was often incapacitated for months on end: Samuel Pepys records that early in 1665 Hyde was forced to lie on a couch during Council meetings. Even neutrals began to see him as a liability, and when attempts to persuade him to retire failed, some spread false reports that he was anxious to step down. These included Sir William Coventry who later admitted to Samuel Pepys that he was largely responsible for these reports; he claimed this was because Clarendon's dominance of policy and refusal to consider alternatives made even their discussion impossible. In his memoirs, Clarendon makes clear his bitterness against Coventry for what he regarded as betrayal, which he contrasted with the loyalty shown by his brother Henry.

Above all, the military setbacks of the Second Anglo-Dutch War of 1665 to 1667, together with the disasters of the Plague of 1665 and the Great Fire of London, led to his downfall, and the successful Dutch raid on the Medway in June 1667 was the final blow to his career. Despite having opposed the war, unlike many of his accusers, he was removed from office; as he left Whitehall, Barbara Villiers shouted abuse at him, to which he replied with simple dignity: "Madam, pray remember that if you live, you will also be old".

Earl of Clarendon Act 1667
- Act of Parliament
- Parliament of England
- Long title: An Act for banishing and disenabling the Earl of Clarendon.
- Citation: 19 & 20 Cha. 2. c. 2 (Note: This is the citation in The Statutes of the Realm.); 19 Cha. 2. c. 10 (Note: This is the citation in The Statutes at Large.)
- Territorial extent: England and Wales

Dates
- Royal assent: 19 December 1667
- Commencement: 10 October 1667 (Note: Start of session.)
- Repealed: 30 July 1948
Other legislation
Repealed by	Statute Law Revision Act 1948

Status: Repealed

Text of statute as originally enacted

At almost the same time he suffered a great personal blow when his wife died after a short illness: in a will drawn up the previous year, he described her as "my dearly beloved wife, who hath accompanied and assisted me in all my distresses". Clarendon was impeached by the House of Commons for blatant violations of Habeas Corpus, for having sent prisoners out of England to places like Jersey and holding them there without benefit of trial. He was forced to flee to France in November 1667. The King made it clear that he would not defend him, and this betrayal of his old and loyal servant harmed Charles's reputation. Efforts to pass an Act of Attainder against him failed, but an act providing for his banishment, the Earl of Clarendon Act 1667 (19 & 20 Cha. 2. c. 2), was passed in December and received the royal assent. Apart from the Duke of York (Clarendon's son-in-law) and Henry Coventry, few spoke in his defence. Clarendon was accompanied to France by his private chaplain and ally William Levett, later Dean of Bristol.

== Exile, death, and legacy ==
Arms of Edward Hyde, Earl of Clarendon: Quarterly, 1st and 4th: Azure, a chevron between three lozenges Or (Hyde); 2nd: Paly of six or and gules a bend azure (Langford); 3rd: Azure, a cross argent (Aylesbury).

The rest of Clarendon's life was passed in exile. He left Calais for Rouen on 25 December, returning on 21 January 1668, visiting the baths of Bourbon in April, thence to Avignon in June, residing from July 1668 till June 1671 at Montpellier, whence he proceeded to Moulins and to Rouen again in May 1674. His sudden banishment entailed great personal hardships. His health at the time of his flight was much impaired, and on arriving at Calais he fell dangerously ill; and Louis XIV, anxious at this time to gain popularity in England, sent him peremptory and repeated orders to quit France. He suffered severely from gout, and during the greater part of his exile could not walk without the aid of two men. At Évreux, on 23 April 1668, he was the victim of a murderous assault by English sailors, who attributed to him the non-payment of their wages, and who were on the point of despatching him when he was rescued by the guard. For some time he was not allowed to see any of his children; even correspondence with him was rendered treasonable by the Act of Banishment; and it was not apparently until 1671, 1673, and 1674 that he received visits from his sons, the younger, Lawrence Hyde, being present with him at his death.

He spent his exile updating and expanding his History, the classic account of the Wars of the Three Kingdoms, and for which he is chiefly remembered today. The sale proceeds from this book were instrumental in building the Clarendon Building and Clarendon Fund at Oxford University Press. During his exile, he also wrote his autobiography, a number of essays, a work on David's psalms, and a critique of Thomas Hobbes's book Leviathan.

The diarist Samuel Pepys wrote thirty years later that he never knew anyone who could speak as well as Hyde.

He died in Rouen, France, on 9 December 1674. Shortly after his death, his body was returned to England, and he was buried in a private ceremony in Westminster Abbey on 4 January 1675.

== Portrayals in drama and fiction ==
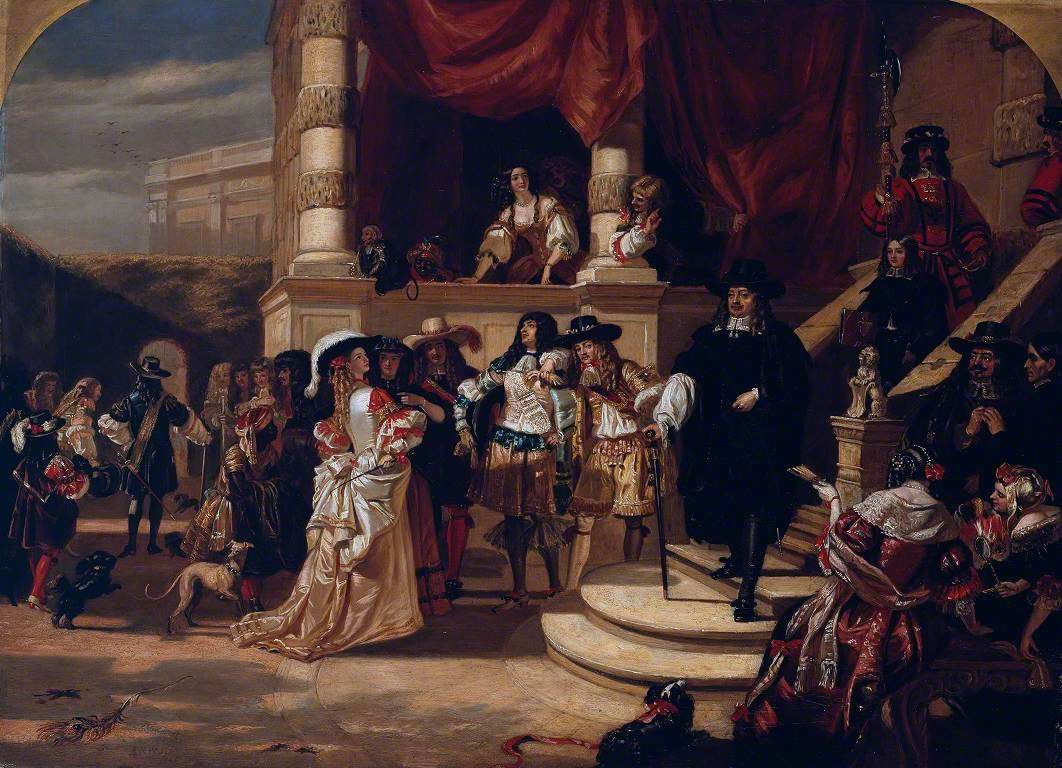
The Disgrace of Lord Clarendon by Edward Matthew Ward, 1846. The painting depicts the scene follow Clarendon's 1667 dismissal.

Nigel Bruce played Sir Edward Hyde in the 1947 film The Exile, with Douglas Fairbanks, Jr. as Charles II.

In the film Cromwell, Clarendon (called only Sir Edward Hyde in the film), is portrayed by Nigel Stock as a sympathetic yet conflicted man torn between Parliament and the King. He finally turns against Charles I altogether when the King pretends to accept Cromwell's terms of peace but secretly and treacherously plots to raise a Catholic army against Parliament and start a second civil war. Clarendon reluctantly, but bravely, gives testimony at the King's trial (where in real life he was not present) which is instrumental in condemning him to death.

In the 2003 BBC TV mini-series Charles II: The Power and The Passion, Clarendon was played by actor Ian McDiarmid. The series portrayed Clarendon (referred to as 'Sir Edward Hyde' throughout) as acting in a paternalistic fashion towards Charles II, something the King comes to dislike. It is also intimated that he had arranged the marriage of Charles and Catherine of Braganza already knowing that she was infertile so that his granddaughters through his daughter Anne Hyde (who had married the future James II) would eventually inherit the throne of England.

In the 2004 film Stage Beauty, starring Billy Crudup and Claire Danes, Clarendon (again referred to simply as Edward Hyde) is played by Edward Fox.

In fiction, Clarendon is a minor character in An Instance of the Fingerpost by Iain Pears and in Act of Oblivion (2022) by Robert Harris. He is also a recurring character in the Thomas Chaloner series of mystery novels by Susanna Gregory. All three authors show him in a fairly sympathetic light.

== Works ==
- The history of Rebellion and Civil War in Ireland (1720)
- A Collection of several tracts of Edward, Earl of Clarendon, (1727)
- Religion and Policy, and the Countenance and Assistance each should give to the other, with a Survey of the Power and Jurisdiction of the Pope in the dominion of other Princes (Oxford 1811, 2 volumes)
- History of the Rebellion and Civil Wars in England: Begun in the Year 1641 by Edward Hyde, 1st Earl of Clarendon (3 volumes) (1702–1704):
  - Volume I, Part 1,
  - Volume I, Part 2, new edition, 1807.
  - Volume II, Part 1,
  - Volume II, Part 2,
  - Volume III, Part 1,
  - Volume III, Part 2
- Essays, Moral and Entertaining by Clarendon (J. Sharpe, 1819)
- The Life of Edward Earl of Clarendon, Lord High Chancellor of England, and Chancellor of the University of Oxford Containing:
  - I Life of Edward Earl of Clarendon: An Account of the Chancellor's Life from his Birth to the Restoration in 1660
  - II Life of Edward Earl of Clarendon: A Continuation of the same, and of his History of the Grand Rebellion, from the Restoration to his Banishment in 1667
- A brief view and survey of the dangerous and pernicious errors to church and state, in Mr. Hobbes's book, entitled Leviathan (published posthumously in 1676)

== See also ==
- Historiography of the United Kingdom

== Sources ==
- Clarendon, Henry Hyde, Earl of; Rochester, Laurence Hyde, Earl of (1828). The Correspondence of Henry Hyde, Earl of Clarendon, and His Brother Laurence Hyde, Earl of Rochester: With the Diary of Lord Clarendon from 1687 to 1690, Containing Minute Particulars of the Events Attending the Revolution and the Diary of Lord Rochester During His Embassy to Poland in 1676. H. Colburn. p. 285.
- Eales, Jackie (2019). "Can You Keep a Secret?". History Today. 69 (7).
- Firth, Charles Harding (1891), "Hyde, Edward (1609-1674)" , in Lee, Sidney (ed.), Dictionary of National Biography, vol. 28, London: Smith, Elder & Co, pp. 370–389 Contains a list of Clarendon's works.
- Lister, Life of Clarendon (2 volume ed.)
- Holmes, Clive (2007). Why was Charles I executed?. Continuum. ISBN 978-1847250247.
- Hutton, Ronald (2004). "Goring, George, Baron Goring". Oxford Dictionary of National Biography (online ed.). Oxford University Press. doi:10.1093/ref:odnb/11100. (Subscription, Wikipedia Library access or UK public library membership required.)
- Hyde, Edward (2009). The History of the Rebellion: A New Selection. Oxford University Press. ISBN 978-0199228171.
- Kenyon, J.P. (1978). The Pelican History of England, Vol.6: Stuart England. Viking. ISBN 978-0713910872.
- Maclagan, Michael; Louda, Jiří (1999). Line of Succession: Heraldry of the Royal Families of Europe. Little, Brown & Co. ISBN 1-85605-469-1.
- Naylor, Leonard (1983). Henning, BD (ed.). HYDE, Laurence (1642-1711), of St. James's Square, Westminster and Vasterne Park, Wootton Bassett, Wilts in The History of Parliament: the House of Commons 1660–1690. Boydell & Brewer.
- Ollard, Richard (1987). Clarendon and his Friends. Hamish Hamilton. ISBN 978-0241123805.
- Seaward, Paul (2008). "Hyde, Edward, first earl of Clarendon". Oxford Dictionary of National Biography (online ed.). Oxford University Press. doi:10.1093/ref:odnb/14328. (Subscription, Wikipedia Library access or UK public library membership required.)
- Trevor-Roper, Hugh (1979). "Clarendon's 'History of the Rebellion'". History Today. 29 (2).
- Wagner, A.F.H.V. (1958), Extract from: Gillingham Grammar School, Dorset – An Historical Account (First ed.), Gillingham Museum, archived from the original on 14 February 2017
- Willis, Browne (1750), Notitia Parliamentaria, Part II: A Series or Lists of the Representatives in the several Parliaments held from the Reformation 1541, to the Restoration 1660 ..., London, pp. 229–239
- Zagorin, Perez (2007). "Clarendon against Leviathan". In Springborg, Patricia (ed.). The Cambridge Companion to Hobbes's Leviathan. Cambridge University Press. pp. 460–477. ISBN 9781139001571.

== Bibliography ==
- Brownley, Martine Watson. Clarendon & the Rhetoric of Historical Form (1985)
- Craik, Henry. The life of Edward, earl of Clarendon, lord high chancellor of England. (2 vol., 1911) online, vol. 1 to 1660, and vol. 2 from 1660
- Eustace, Timothy. "Edward Hyde, Earl of Clarendon," in Timothy Eustace, ed., Statesmen and Politicians of the Stuart Age (London, 1985), pp. 157–178.
- Finlayson, Michael G. "Clarendon, Providence, and the Historical Revolution", Albion (1990), 22#4, pp. 607–632 in JSTOR
- Firth, Charles H. "Clarendon's 'History of the Rebellion,"' Parts 1, II, III, English Historical Review vol 19, nos. 73–75 (1904)
- Harris, R.W. Clarendon and the English Revolution (London, 1983).
- Hill, Christopher. "Clarendon and the Civil War", History Today (1953), 3#10, pp. 695–703
- Hill, Christopher. "Lord Clarendon and the Puritan Revolution", in Hill, Puritanism and Revolution (London, 1958)
- MacGillivray, R.C. (1974). Restoration Historians and the English Civil War. Springer. ISBN 9789024716784.
- Major, Philip, ed. Clarendon Reconsidered: Law, Loyalty, Literature, 1640–1674 (2017), topical essays by scholars
- Miller, G.E. Edward Hyde, Earl of Clarendon (Boston, 1983), as historical writer
- Richardson, R.C. The Debate on the English Revolution Revisited (London, 1988)
- Trevor-Roper, Hugh. "Edward Hyde, Earl of Clarendon" in Trevor-Roper, From Counter-Reformation to Glorious Revolution (1992) pp. 173–94 online
- Wormald, B.H.G. Clarendon, Politics, History & Religion, 1640–1660 (1951) online
- Wormald, B.H.G. "How Hyde Became a Royalist", Cambridge Historical Journal 8#2 (1945), pp. 65–92 in JSTOR

Parliament of England
Vacant Parliament suspended since 1629	Member of Parliament for Shaftesbury; 1640; With: William Whitaker	Succeeded by William Whitaker; Samuel Turner
Vacant Parliament suspended since 1629	Member of Parliament for Wootton Bassett; 1640; With: Sir Thomas Windebanke, 1st Baronet	Succeeded by William Pleydell; Edward Poole
Preceded by George Buller (MP); Francis Buller	Member of Parliament for Saltash; 1640–1642; With: George Buller (MP)	Succeeded by John Thynne; Henry Wills
Political offices
Preceded by Sir John Colepeper	Chancellor of the Exchequer; 1643–1646	Interregnum
Vacant Title last held by Sir Edward Herbert	Lord Chancellor; 1658–1667	Succeeded by Orlando Bridgeman (Lord Keeper)
Preceded by The Lord Cottington (Lord High Treasurer)	First Lord of the Treasury; 1660	Succeeded by The Earl of Southampton (Lord High Treasurer)
Vacant Interregnum	Chancellor of the Exchequer; 1660–1661	Succeeded by Sir Anthony Ashley-Cooper
Academic offices
Preceded by Duke of Somerset	Chancellor of the University of Oxford; 1660–1667	Succeeded by Gilbert Sheldon
Honorary titles
Preceded by The Viscount Falkland	Lord Lieutenant of Oxfordshire; 1663–1668	Succeeded by The Viscount Saye and Sele
Vacant Title last held by The Duke of Ormonde	Lord High Steward; 1666	Vacant Title next held by The Lord Finch
Preceded by The Earl of Southampton	Lord Lieutenant of Wiltshire; 1667–1668	Succeeded by The Earl of Essex
Peerage of England
New creation	Earl of Clarendon; 1661–1674	Succeeded by Henry Hyde
New creation	Baron Hyde; 1660–1674	Succeeded by Henry Hyde
