= Richard Buller =

English politician

Sir Richard Buller (1578–1642) was an English politician who sat in the House of Commons variously between 1621 and 1642. He was a Parliamentarian officer during the English Civil War.

Buller was born at Shillingham Cornwall, the son of Francis Buller and his wife Thomasina Williams, daughter of Thomas Williams of Stowford, an Elizabethan-era Speaker of the House of Commons. He was knighted in 1608.

Buller was elected Member of Parliament for St Germans in 1621. He was subsequently MP for Saltash from 1625 to 1629 when King Charles I decided to rule without parliament. He was High Sheriff of Cornwall in 1637. In April 1640, Buller was elected MP for Cornwall in the Short Parliament. In November 1640, he was elected MP for Fowey in the Long Parliament.

Buller was involved in military operations in Cornwall in 1642, and was forced to retreat from Launceston. He died in November that year at the age of 64.

== Marriage and issue ==
Buller married Alice Hayward, the daughter of Sir Rowland Hayward, Lord Mayor of London. They had six sons and six daughters. Three of their sons, Francis, George, and Anthony, served in Parliament.

Parliament of England
| Preceded by John Eliot; John Trott | Member of Parliament for St Germans; 1621–1622; With: Richard Tisdale | Succeeded by Sir John Coke; Sir John Stradling |
| Preceded by Thomas Trevor; Francis Buller | Member of Parliament for Saltash; 1625–1629; With: Francis Buller 1625; John Heywood 1625–1626; Sir Francis Cottington 1628–1629 | Parliament suspended until 1640 |
| Vacant Parliament suspended since 1629 | Member of Parliament for Cornwall; 1640; With: William Godolphin | Succeeded by Sir Bevil Grenville; Alexander Carew |
| Preceded by Jonathan Rashleigh | Member of Parliament for Fowey; 1640–1642; With: Jonathan Rashleigh; Edwin Rich | Succeeded by Jonathan Rashleigh |
