= Anthony Buller (Callington MP) =

English politician (1613–1679)

Anthony Buller (1613–1679) was an English soldier and politician who sat in the House of Commons between 1659 and 1660. He fought in the Parliamentary army in the English Civil War.

Buller was the son of Sir Richard Buller, of Shillingham, Cornwall and his wife Alice Hayward, daughter of Sir Rowland Hayward. He was baptised on 14 November 1613. The Buller family was originally from Somerset and acquired Shillingham in around 1555. In the Civil War, he was a captain on the horse in the Parliamentary army becoming major in 1646. His own reputation for valour was high, but his troopers were given to disorderly and licentious behaviour. He was governor of the Scilly Isles after they were surrendered by Francis Godolphin in 1647 until 1648 when he was captured in the Royalist revolt. He was held prisoner but treated with special kindness as a "gallant soldier". He served in the Western Design, an expedition to the West Indies during the Anglo-Spanish War (1654–1660). He was a colonel of foot from 1654 to 1655.

In 1659, Buller was elected Member of Parliament for Callington in the Third Protectorate Parliament. In 1660, he was elected MP for Saltash in the Convention Parliament. He was a captain in the Duke of York's Horse Guards from 1660 to 1661. In 1661 he stood unsuccessfully for parliament for Bossiney. He was deputy governor of the Scilly Isles from 1666 to 1667. He served in the admiralty regiment from 1667 until his death. He raised 300 men for the defence of the Scilly Isles during the Second Dutch War, and was given a newly built Sloop HMS Portsmouth.

Buller died before August 1679 when his will was proved. He was married and had a son who inherited his estates in Westminster and Weybridge and four daughters. His brothers Francis Buller and George Buller were also MPs for Saltash.

Parliament of England
Preceded by Not represented in Second Protectorate Parliament	Member of Parliament for Callington; 1659; With: Thomas Carew	Succeeded by Not represented in Restored Rump
