= Edward Hawke, 11th Baron Hawke =

The Right Honourable The Lord Hawke FRICS TD

Member of the House of Lords
- Lord Temporal
- In office 19 August 1992 – 11 November 1999 as a hereditary peer
- Preceded by: The 10th Baron Hawke
- Succeeded by: Seat abolished (Note: Pursuant to the House of Lords Act 1999.)

Personal details
- Born: Edward George Hawke; 25 January 1950
- Died: 2 December 2009 (aged 59)
- Political party: Conservative
- Profession: Chartered Surveyor

Edward George Hawke, 11th Baron Hawke (25 January 1950 – 2 December 2009), was a British peer, soldier, and Chartered Surveyor, a member of the House of Lords from 1992 to 1999.

The son of Julian Stanhope Theodore Hawke, 10th Baron Hawke, and his wife Georgette Margaret Davidson, he was educated at Eton College, then at the Mons Officer Cadet School, from where on 31 January 1970 he was commissioned into the 1st Battalion, the Coldstream Guards, and in 1973 was promoted to Lieutenant. He transferred to the Queen's Own Yeomanry, in which in 1977 he was promoted to captain, and in 1984 to major, and trained as a Chartered Surveyor.

On 19 August 1992, on his father's death, Hawke succeeded as Baron Hawke, in the Peerage of Great Britain. He became a Fellow of the Royal Institution of Chartered Surveyors and was awarded the Territorial Decoration.

On 4 September 1993, Hawke married Bronwen M. James, a daughter of William T. James. They had two children:

- William Martin Theodore Hawke, 12th Baron Hawke (born 1995)
- Alice Julia Hawke (born 1999)

In 2003, they were living at the Old Mill House, Cuddington, Cheshire.

Hawke died on 2 December 2009, aged 59, after a short illness.

== Notes ==
Peerage of Great Britain
Preceded by Julian Hawke	Baron Hawke; 1992–2009; Member of the House of Lords (1992–1999)	Succeeded by William Hawke
