= Edward Hyde (died 1665) =

Edward Hyde (baptised 1 April 1645 – 10 January 1665) briefly served as a Member of Parliament in the House of Commons of England.

He was the third son of Edward Hyde, 1st Earl of Clarendon. He was educated at Christ Church, Oxford and the Middle Temple. In 1664, age nineteen, he was elected to Parliament for Salisbury, on the nomination of his father, the High Steward of the city. He died the following year.
