= An Academy by Lamplight =

Painting by Joseph Wright of Derby

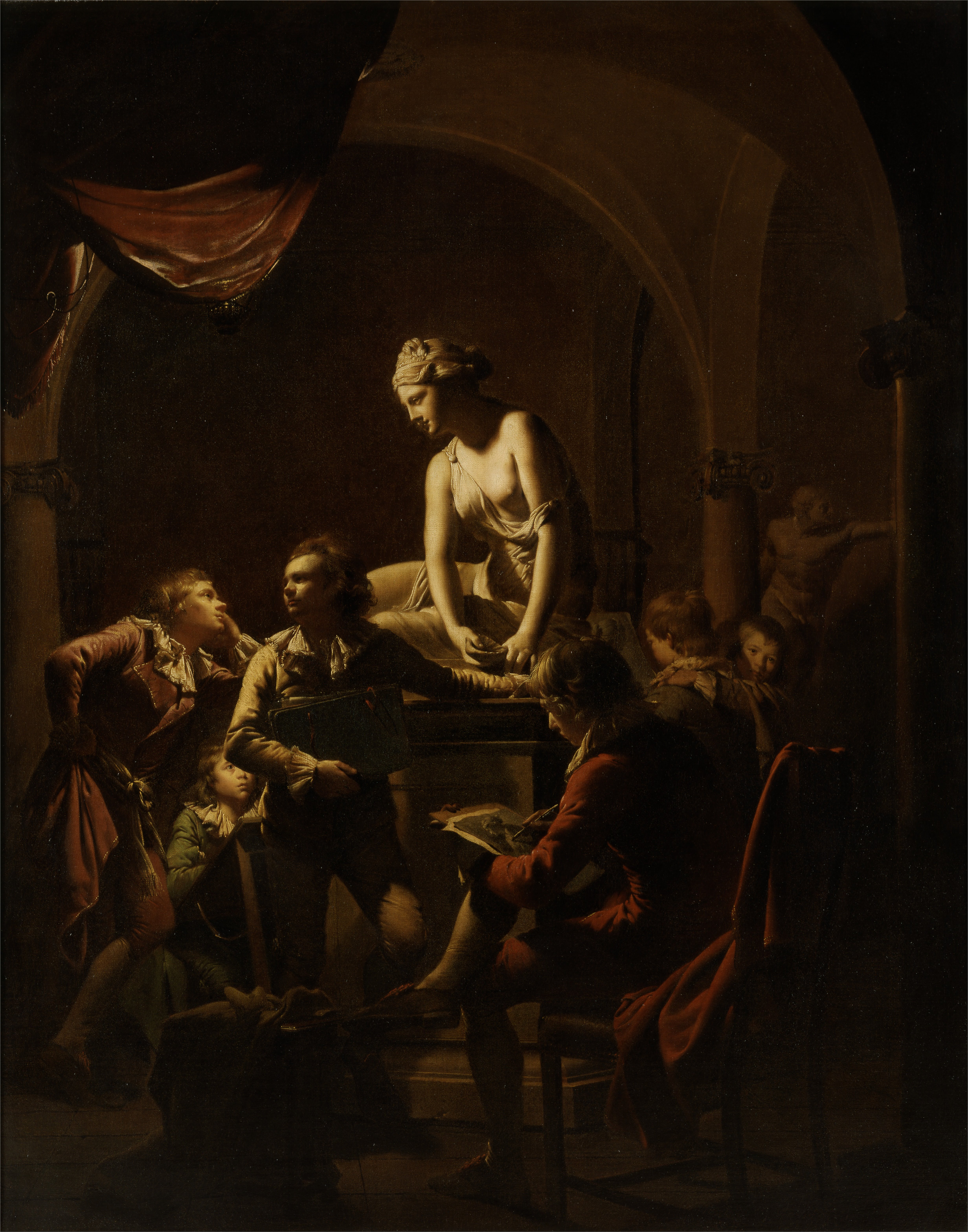
- Artist: Joseph Wright of Derby
- Year: 1769
- Type: Oil on canvas, genre painting
- Dimensions: 127 cm × 101 cm (50 in × 40 in)
- Location: Yale Center for British Art, Connecticut

An Academy by Lamplight is a 1769 genre painting by the British artist Joseph Wright of Derby. It features a view of an art academy where a group of students are gathered round an Ancient Roman statue based on a Borghese Nymph with a Shell, learning sketching. Lit by candlelight, it features the Tenebrism style that Wright used in a number of his paintings from the period. The lifelike statue in the shadows evokes the Pygmalion myth.

Wright displayed the work at the Exhibition of 1769 held by the Society of Artists in London's Spring Gardens. Today, it is in the collection of the Yale Center for British Art in Connecticut. A mezzotint based on the painting was produced in 1772 by William Pether.

== Bibliography ==
- Barker, Elizabeth E. & Kidson, Alex . Joseph Wright of Derby in Liverpool. Yale University Press, 2007.
- Riding, Christine & King, Jon. Wright of Derby: From the Shadows. National Gallery, 2005.
