= Bladen Hawke, 9th Baron Hawke =

British Conservative politician (1901–1985)

Bladen Wilmer Hawke, 9th Baron Hawke (31 December 1901 – 5 July 1985), was a British Conservative politician. He was the eldest son of Edward Julian Hawke, 8th Baron Hawke, whom he succeeded as 9th Baron Hawke in 1939. His uncle had been Martin Hawke, 7th Baron Hawke, who died in 1938. Hawke's mother was Lady Frances Alice Hawke, daughter of Colonel John Randal Wilmer.

== Life and politics ==
Hawke was educated at Winchester College and King's College, Cambridge, where he read history, before working for the Bombay Company in India and as a civil servant at the Ministry of Economic Warfare and then, during World War II, at the War Office. Having succeeded in the barony, he served as a Lord-in-waiting (government whip in the House of Lords) from 1953 to 1957 in the Conservative administrations of Sir Winston Churchill, Sir Anthony Eden and Harold Macmillan. From 1958 to 1973 he was a Church Commissioner.

== Family ==
Hawke married Ina Mary Faure Walker (1912-2002), daughter of Henry Faure Walker, in 1934. They had seven daughters.

== Death ==
He died in July 1985, aged 83. As he had no sons he was succeeded in the barony by his younger brother, Julian.

== Notes ==
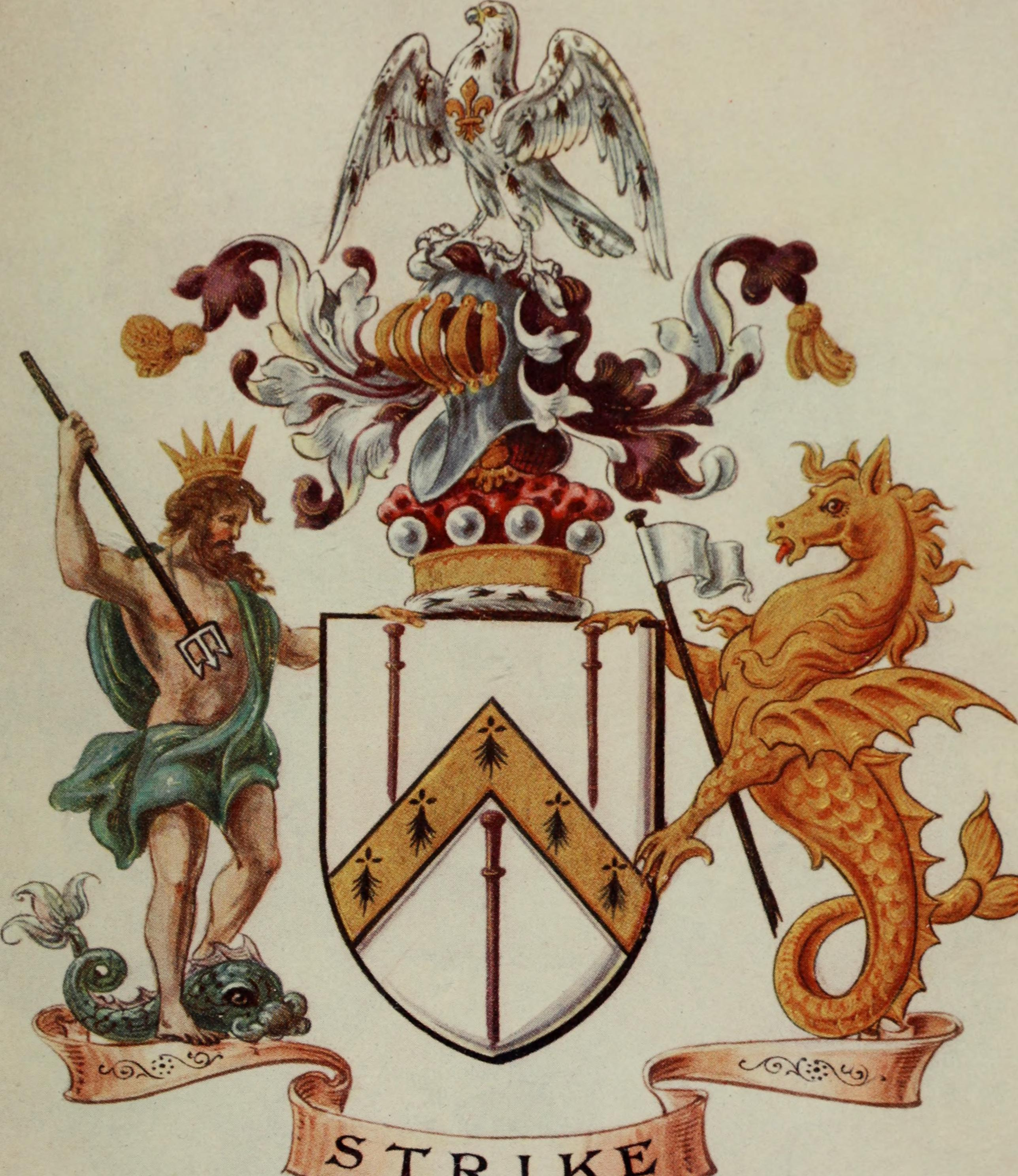
Hawke Coat of Arms

Peerage of Great Britain
Preceded by Edward Julian Hawke	Baron Hawke; 1939–1985	Succeeded by Julian Stanhope Theodore Hawke
