= A Philosopher by Lamplight =

Painting by Joseph Wright of Derby

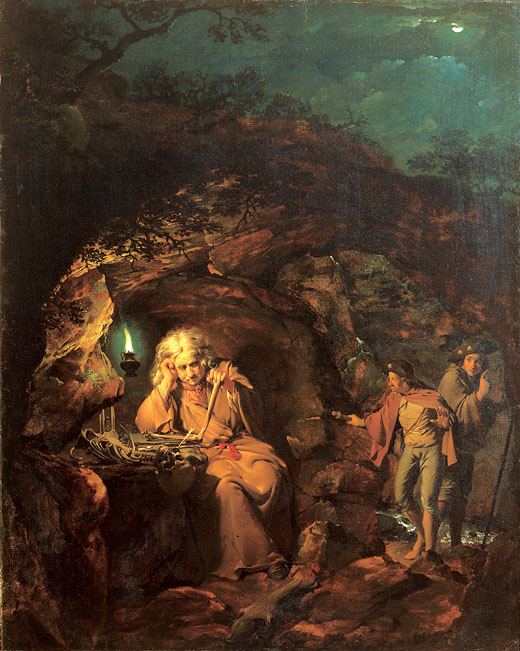
- Artist: Joseph Wright of Derby
- Year: 1769 (first exhibited)
- Medium: Oil on canvas
- Dimensions: 1282 mm × 1029 mm (50.5 in × 40.5 in)
- Location: Derby Museum and Art Gallery; Derby

A Philosopher by lamplight (also known as A Hermit Studying Anatomy) is a painting by Joseph Wright of Derby. It is not known when Wright painted the picture, but it was first exhibited in 1769 in London with the Society of Artists. This was one of the earliest of many lamplight or candlelight paintings and portraits for which Wright is famed.

== Description ==
This picture was described in the catalogue of the 1801 sale as a companion to The Alchemist Discovering Phosphorus. Each has a main figure in the foreground with two subsidiary ones behind, both are night scenes and show old men engaged in scientific research.

The painting shows an old man who is thought to be a philosopher or a pilgrim, examining a collection of human bones in a lamp-lit cave. Two smaller men, or boys, dressed as pilgrims (as identified by the scallop shells in their hats: the emblem of St James) seem to be approaching him. The size of these figures is a lot smaller than the main character in the painting. Outside the cave the dark landscape is lit by the moonlight breaking through the clouds. Shells were the sign of pilgrims but they were also the emblem of the Darwin family which included Erasmus Darwin who was a leading member of the Lunar Society and Derby Philosophical Society which linked key men in the age of enlightenment.

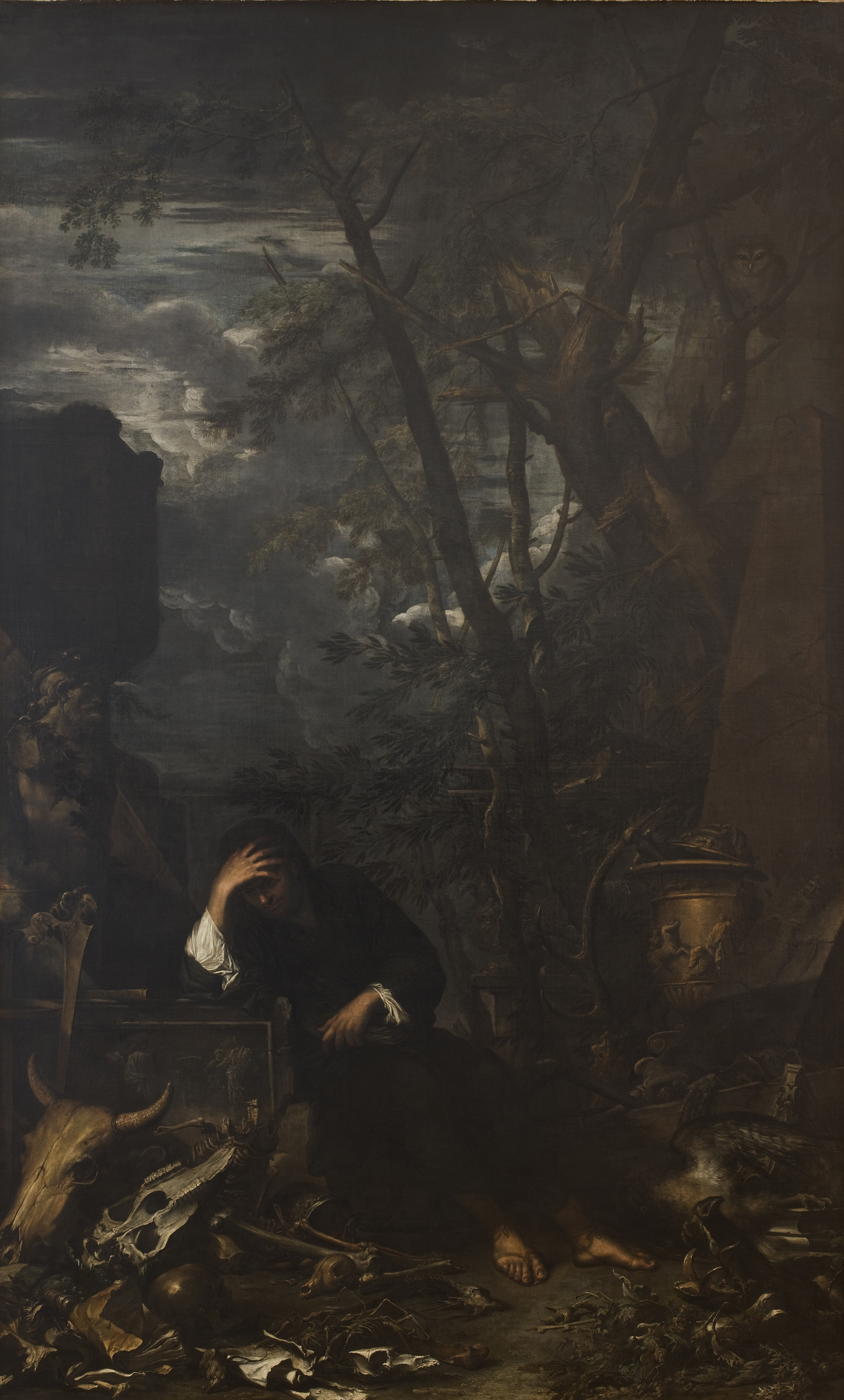
Democritus in Meditation by Salvator Rosa.

Experts believe that this painting was based on Salvator Rosa's Democritus in Meditation. Wright’s friend John Hamilton Mortimer was a follower of Rosa’s so it is possible that Wright would have seen Rosa's work or an engraving of it. Democritus was a Greek philosopher who is remembered for making fun of the foolishness of mankind.

Though the painting's subtitle is A Hermit Studying Anatomy, his attitude towards the bones he is holding does not suggest particularly serious scrutiny. He is surrounded by symbols of the ephemeral nature of the human condition which include the skeleton, a lamp that will burn all its fuel, the moon which has to be reborn every four weeks and an hour glass. The moon was also the symbol of the Lunar Society which Wright was strongly associated with although he never became a member.

The preoccupation of the philosopher and trepidation of the two pilgrims may be a reflection on concerns about the new scientific understanding and enlightenment at the time Wright lived.
