= Robert Haldane Bradshaw =

English politician and agent to Francis Egerton, 3rd Duke of Bridgewater (1759 – 1835)

Robert Haldane Bradshaw (23 August 1759 – 8 January 1835) was an English politician and agent to Francis Egerton, 3rd Duke of Bridgewater and, after the duke's death, was the first Superintendent of the Bridgewater Trustees. The trustees administered the duke's estate, which included coal mines at Worsley and the Bridgewater Canal.

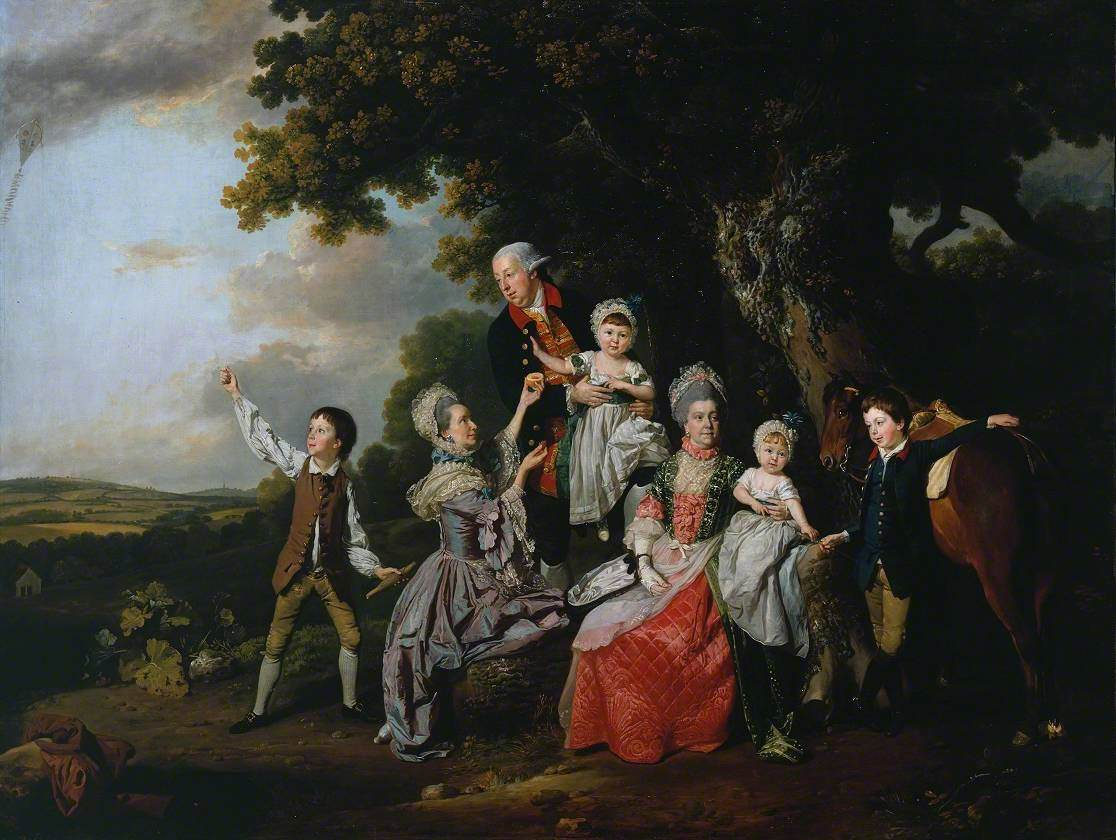
The Bradshaw Family by Johann Zoffany, 1769, in the Tate collection

Robert Haldane Bradshaw was the eldest son of Thomas Bradshaw, who became Secretary to the Treasury and his wife Elizabeth Wilson, daughter of Robert Wilson, of Woodford, Essex and merchant of London. It is possible that Robert was educated at Harrow and he later entered public service. By 1800 he was agent to the Duke of Bridgewater.

In 1802 the duke appointed him as Member of Parliament for the pocket borough of Brackley and he retained this position until it was disenfranchised by the Reform Act 1832. From 1825 until abolition he shared representation of the two-member seat with his own son, James, a Royal Navy captain, who committed suicide during his father's lifetime in 1833.

On the death of the duke in 1803, his estate was vested in three trustees, Bradshaw being appointed superintendent. Bradshaw was totally responsible for running the estate, the other two being "dummy trustees". Following the death of the duke, the income from the Bridgewater Trust went to his nephew George Leveson-Gower, the Marquess of Stafford (later the 1st Duke of Sutherland). On his death it was to go to Stafford's second son Francis Egerton.

Bradshaw was reluctant to leave London, where his home was close to the duke's house, Bridgewater House. While running the Bridgewater estate, he complained of being over-worked, although this was largely due to his inability to delegate. His personality was "intensely conservative", while he had the reputation of being a "formidable negotiator". In November 1831 he suffered a stroke, which affected his left arm and leg and which impaired his business judgement. The Duke of Sutherland died in 1833 and following a disagreement between Bradshaw and Francis Egerton, Bradshaw was persuaded to retire in 1834. He retired to Kings Langley and died there a year later.

== Archives ==
Papers of Robert Haldane Bradshaw are held at the Cadbury Research Library, University of Birmingham.

== See also ==
- Canals of the United Kingdom
- History of the British canal system
