= John Williams (born 1736) =

English politician

John Williams (born 1736) was an English politician. He was MP for Saltash in 1772.

He was the son of John and Sarah Williams, of Nevis, and was baptised on 21 November 1736. He is recorded as being a resident of Brook Street, London, and as having married Charlotte Mary Thornhill on 9 October 1766. He stood for the constituency of Saltash in May 1772, defeating Thomas Bradshaw, who contested the result. Horace Walpole wrote that Williams was a "West Indian", who had been elected by bribery. He held the seat for only two months, before Bradshaw's petition against him succeeded. During this time he spoke twice in the Commons, once to assert his readiness to submit the election to an investigation, and again to speak on the subject of African trade.

A John Williams unsuccessfully contested the seat of Fowey in 1768, and Poole in 1774, though this may have been a different person.

Parliament of Great Britain
Preceded by Martin Hawke; Thomas Bradshaw	Member of Parliament for Saltash; 1772; With: Martin Hawke	Succeeded by Martin Hawke; Thomas Bradshaw
