= Humphrey Cavell =

16th-century English politician

Humphrey Cavell (by 1525 – 17 November 1558) was an English politician.

He was a member (MP) of the parliament of England for Ludgershall in March 1553, Saltash in April and November 1554, and for Bodmin in 1555.
