= Thomas Carew (died 1681) =

English lawyer and politician

Sir Thomas Carew (1624 – 25 July 1681) was an English lawyer and politician who sat in the House of Commons at various times between 1659 and 1681.

Carew was the third surviving son of Sir Richard Carew, 1st Baronet, of Antony, Cornwall and his second wife Grace Rolle, daughter of Robert Rolle of Heanton Satchville, Petrockstowe, Devon. He was baptised on 19 July 1624. He entered Inner Temple in 1641 and was called to the bar in 1651. He did not take part in the English Civil War, but his half brother Alexander was executed for betraying the Parliamentary cause.

In 1659, Carew was elected Member of Parliament for Callington in the Third Protectorate Parliament. He became commissioner for militia in Cornwall and JP for Cornwall in March 1660. He was elected MP for Mitchell in April 1660 for the Convention Parliament. After the restoration, his brother John was hanged drawn and quartered as a regicide. Carew threw himself upon the King's favour and was granted properties at Bowhill and Higher Barley. He acquired further property near Exeter through his marriage. He was commissioner for assessment for Devon from August 1660 and became JP for Devon in 1662. He became commissioner for assessment for Cornwall in 1664. In 1667 he became bencher of his Inn. He was knighted on 21 July 1671. In 1676 he became recorder of Exeter and Deputy Lieutenant. As recorder of Exeter, he was persuaded to stand as MP for Exeter in 1679, but was defeated. He stood again for Exeter in 1681 and was elected.

Carew died at the age of 57 and was buried at St Thomas near Exeter.

Carew married Elizabeth Cupper, daughter of John Cupper, merchant, of Barley, on 26 August 1661. They had three daughters and five sons of whom Thomas sat as MP for Saltash as a Tory from 1701 to 1705.

Parliament of England
Preceded by Not represented in Second Protectorate Parliament	Member of Parliament for Callington; 1659; With: Anthony Buller	Succeeded by Not represented in Restored Rump
