= Joseph Moyle =

English politician (1679–1742)

Joseph Moyle (4 September 1679 – 29 March 1742) was an English Whig politician who sat as MP for Saltash from 1705 till 1708.

He was the fourth but second surviving son of Sir Walter Moyle and Thomasine, the daughter of Sir William Morice, 1st Baronet and the brother of Walter Moyle. He married Catherine, the daughter of Sir Godfrey Copley, 2nd Baronet in October 1711 and had two sons and three daughters.
