= Thomas Bradshaw (MP) =

British civil servant and politician

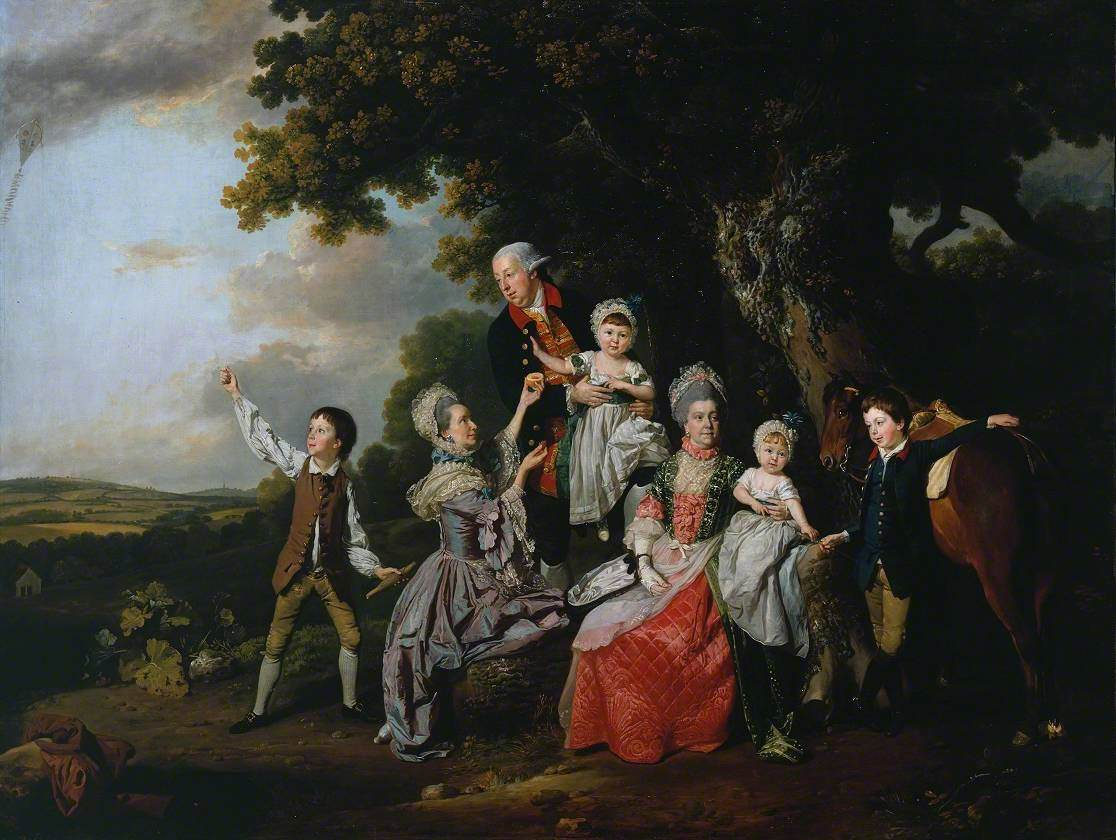
The Bradshaw Family by Johann Zoffany, 1769, in the Tate collection

Thomas Bradshaw (1733–1774) was a British civil servant and politician who sat in the House of Commons between 1767 and 1774.

== Early life ==
Bradshaw was born. 25 January 1733 in humble circumstances and became clerk to a contractor for forage. Around 1757, he obtained a post as Clerk in the War Office. He married Elizabeth Wilson, daughter of Robert Wilson, of Woodford, Essex and merchant of London, in November 1757. Elizabeth's sister had married Anthony Chamier who also became a public official at the War Office. In 1759 Bradshaw was promoted to first clerk at the War Office where he served under Lord Barrington. When Barrington became Chancellor of the Exchequer in 1761, he took Bradshaw to the Treasury as chief clerk in December 1761. In February 1763 Bradshaw became commissioner of taxes. As an important civil servant, he became connected with several influential politicians, including the Duke of Grafton. When Grafton was first lord of the Treasury, he appointed Bradshaw Secretary to the Treasury in August 1767.

== Political career ==
Grafton brought Bradshaw into the House of Commons as Member of Parliament for Harwich, a Government borough, at a by-election on 30 November 1767. Bradshaw helped Grafton with the 1768 general election and was returned himself unopposed as MP for Saltash. From then on he acted mainly as Grafton's confidential man of business in both public and private matters. He acted as Grafton's go-between with Lord North, and when Grafton wanted to divorce his duchess sought evidence of her adultery.

When Grafton resigned in January 1770 he obtained for Bradshaw the reversion for two lives of the office of auditor general of the plantations worth upwards of £2500 a year, and a pension of £1500 a year until the post became vacant. Bradshaw remained at the Treasury, at the request of Grafton and North to induct John Robinson into his duties. In April 1772 Bradshaw was made a Lord of the Admiralty but when he stood for re-election at Saltash was defeated. He was then returned on petition on 8 June 1772. He was returned unopposed for Saltash at the 1774 general election, shortly before his death. He is not known to have participated in parliamentary debates.

== Later life and legacy ==
Bradshaw was noted for his “unbounded extravagance” and a “gay and social disposition”. He died on 6 November 1774, by one account from a fever and by another by shooting himself because he was burdened with debts. His will provided for his family on the strength of the auditorship-general of the plantations, but he never reached that office because it was only held only in reversion. His widow was given a secret service pension of £500 a year, and his two younger sons and daughter were given pensions of £100 a year. Bradshaw's son Robert Haldane Bradshaw was also a public servant and politician.

== See also ==
- Richard Lee Bradshaw ‘’Thomas Bradshaw (1733-1774): A Georgian Politician in the Time of the American Revolution’’ Xlibris Corporation, 12 Aug 2011

Parliament of Great Britain
| Preceded by Charles Townshend; John Roberts | Member of Parliament for Harwich; 1767–1768; With: John Roberts | Succeeded by Edward Harvey; John Roberts |
| Preceded by Hon. Augustus Hervey; George Adams | Member of Parliament for Saltash; 1768– 1772; With: Martin Hawke | Succeeded by Martin Hawke; John Williams |
| Preceded by Martin Hawke; John Williams | Member of Parliament for Saltash; 1772–1774; With: Martin Hawke; Grey Cooper | Succeeded by Grey Cooper; Sir Charles Whitworth |
