= Society of Artists Exhibition of 1769 =

1769 art exhibition in London

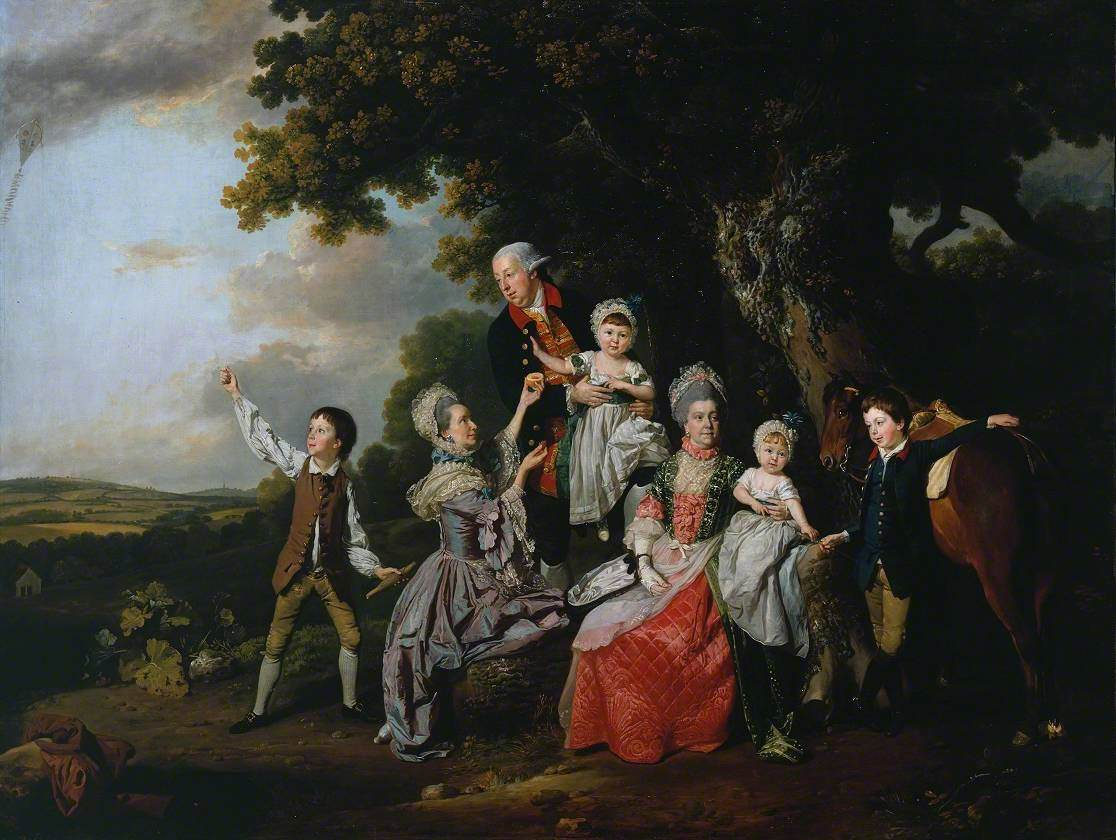
The Bradshaw Family by Johann Zoffany

The Society of Artists Exhibition of 1769 was an art exhibition held in London by the Society of Artists of Great Britain. It took place between 1 May and 2 June 1769 at Spring Gardens in London. It was the first to be held following a major split in the membership, where a leading group of artists departed to form the new Royal Academy of Arts under the Presidency of Joshua Reynolds.

Joshua Kirby who was elected the new president of the society following the split, was optimistic about the exhibition despite the loss of so many members. The inaugural Royal Academy Exhibition of 1769 had opened in April in nearby Pall Mall and the two exhibitions overlapped. The Society of Artists was distinctly the larger exhibition, with 364 works on display, more than twice the 136 featured at the Royal Academy. Despite giving his formal backing to the new Royal Academy, George III also visited the society's exhibition in a gesture of even-handedness.

The exhibition was critically acclaimed, with Horace Walpole describing it as "the best collection, not only this year, but that has been exhibited hitherto". Johann Zoffany displayed ten paintings, Robert Edge Pine seven and John Hamilton Mortimer six. Some of the best-known paintings to be exhibited were by Joseph Wright of Derby. An Academy by Lamplight and A Philosopher by Lamplight feature the Tenebrist style by showing them in candlelight. Thomas Jones switched to historical landscapes for the first and Kirby displayed a View of Ockham Mill in Surrey. Ozias Humphry featured a miniature of Charlotte, Princess Royal. George Stubbs displayed several of his animal paintings including Lion Devouring a Stag, A Tiger and part of his series Two Gentlemen Shooting.

== Gallery ==
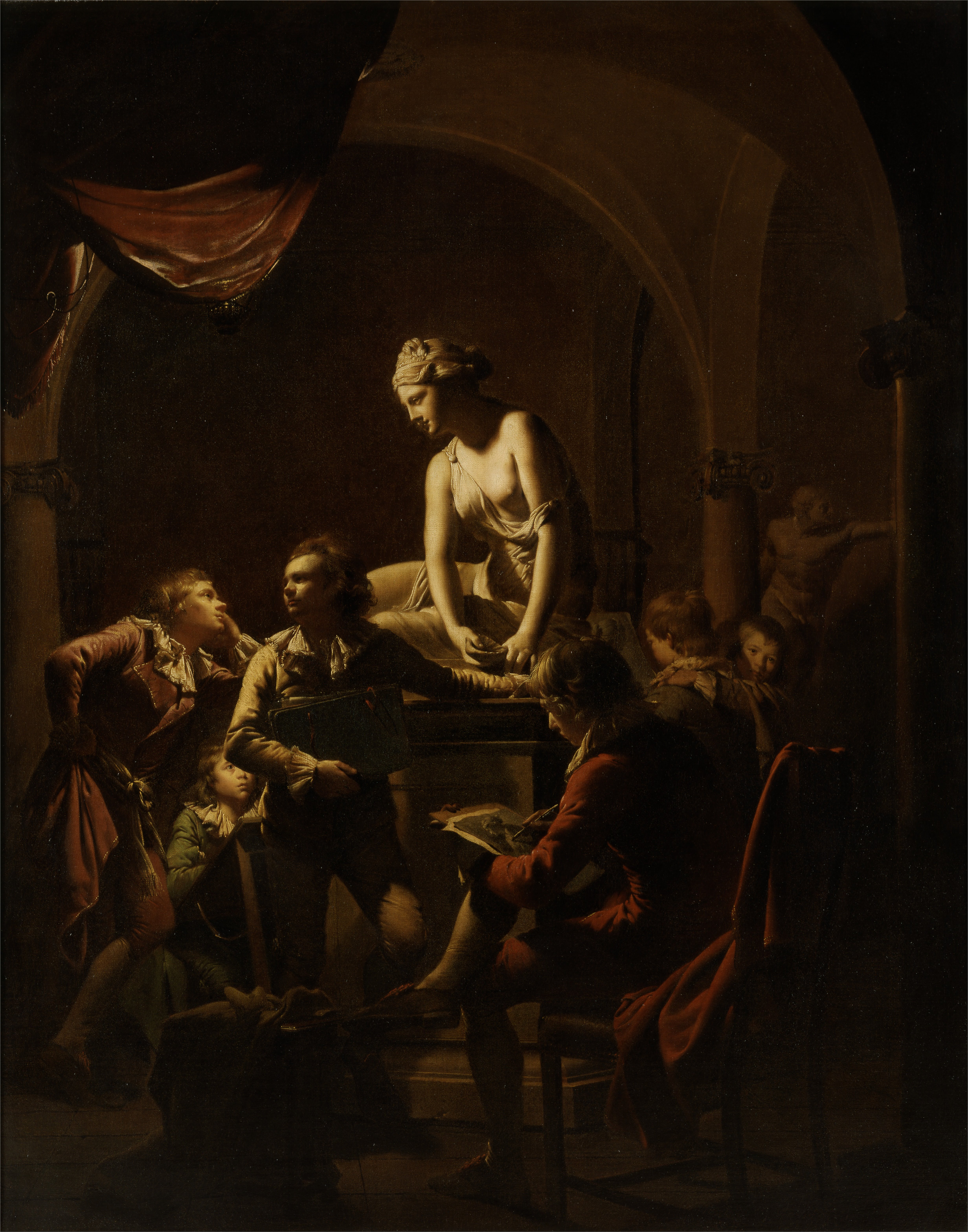
An Academy by Lamplight by Joseph Wright of Derby

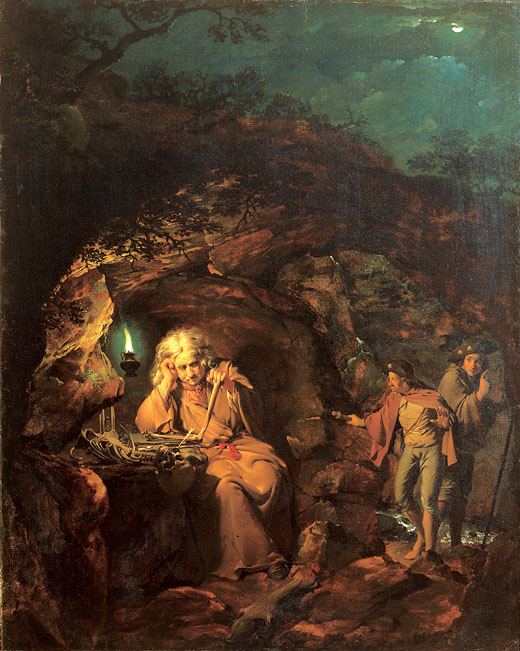
A Philosopher by Lamplight by Joseph Wright of Derby

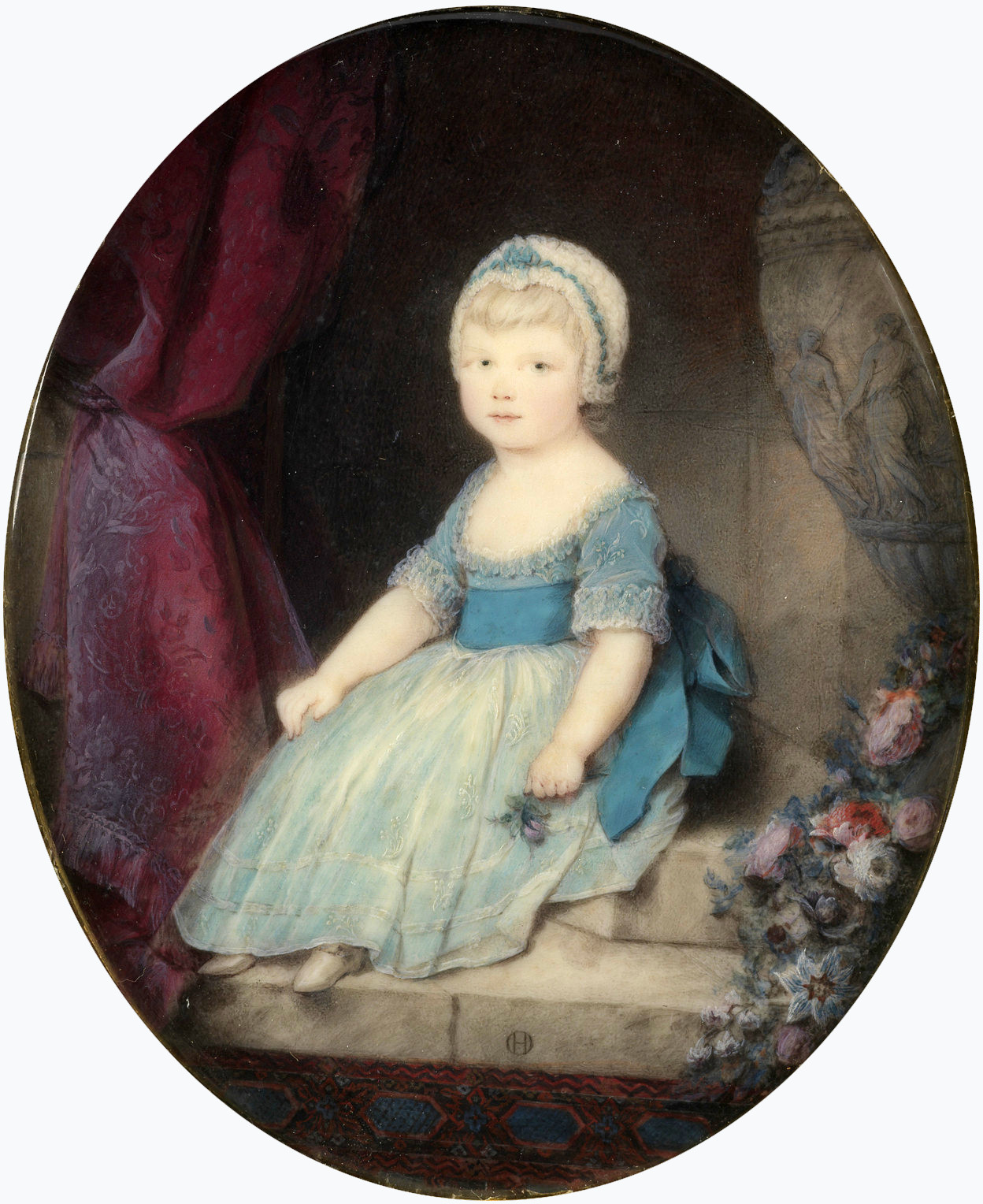
Charlotte, Princess Royal by Ozias Humphry

== See also ==
- Salon of 1769, the premier French art exhibition held at the Louvre in Paris

== Bibliography ==
- Ayres, James. Art, Artisans and Apprentices: Apprentice Painters & Sculptors in the Early Modern British Tradition. Oxbow Books, 2014.
- Egerton, Judy. George Stubbs, Painter. Yale University Press, 2007.
- Hargreaves, Matthew. Candidates for Fame: The Society of Artists of Great Britain, 1760-1791. Paul Mellon Centre for Studies in British Art, 2005.
- McIntyre, Ian. Joshua Reynolds: The Life and Times of the First President of the Royal Academy. Allen Lane, 2003.
