= Thomas Williams (speaker) =

English politician (1514–1566)

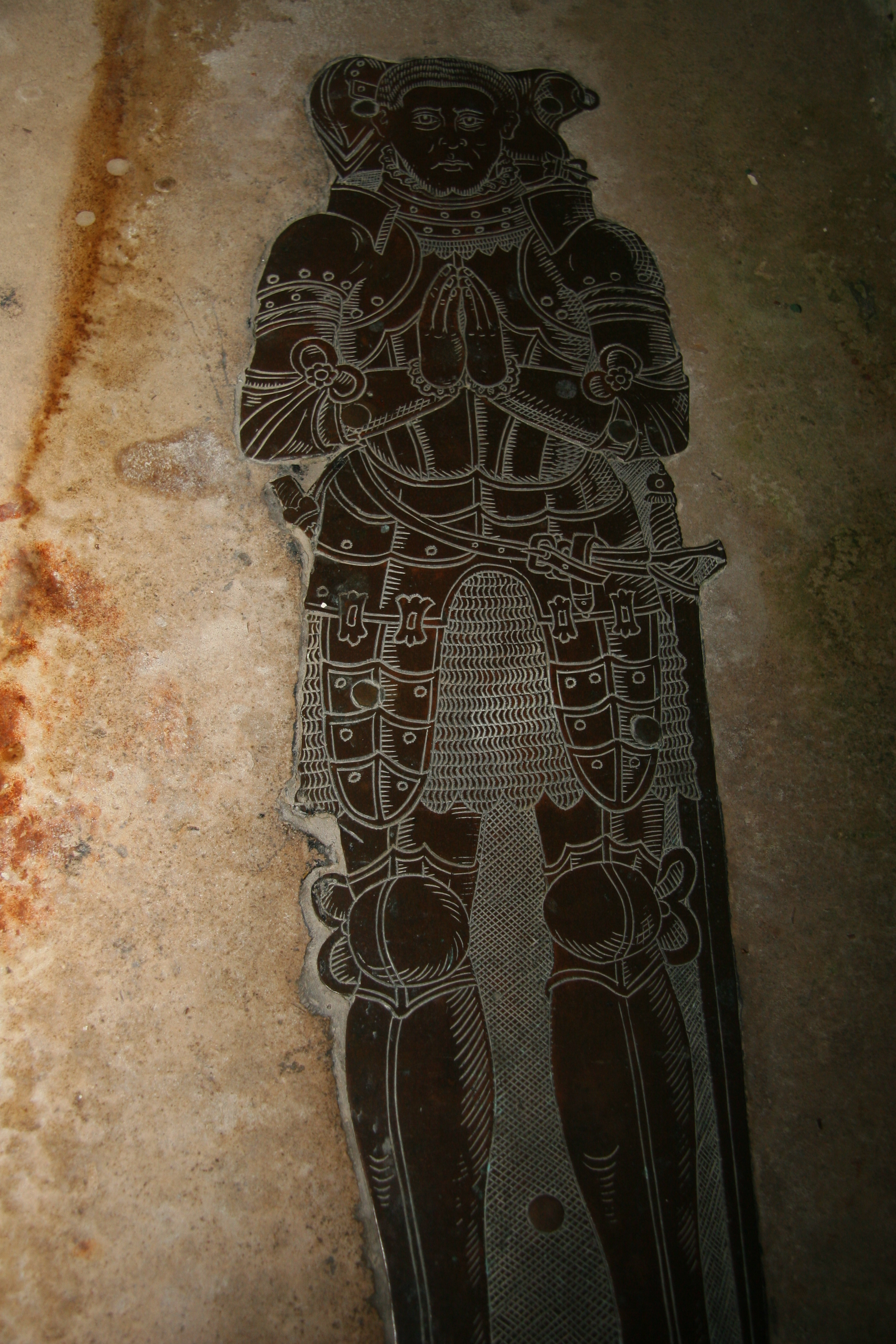
MP brass image

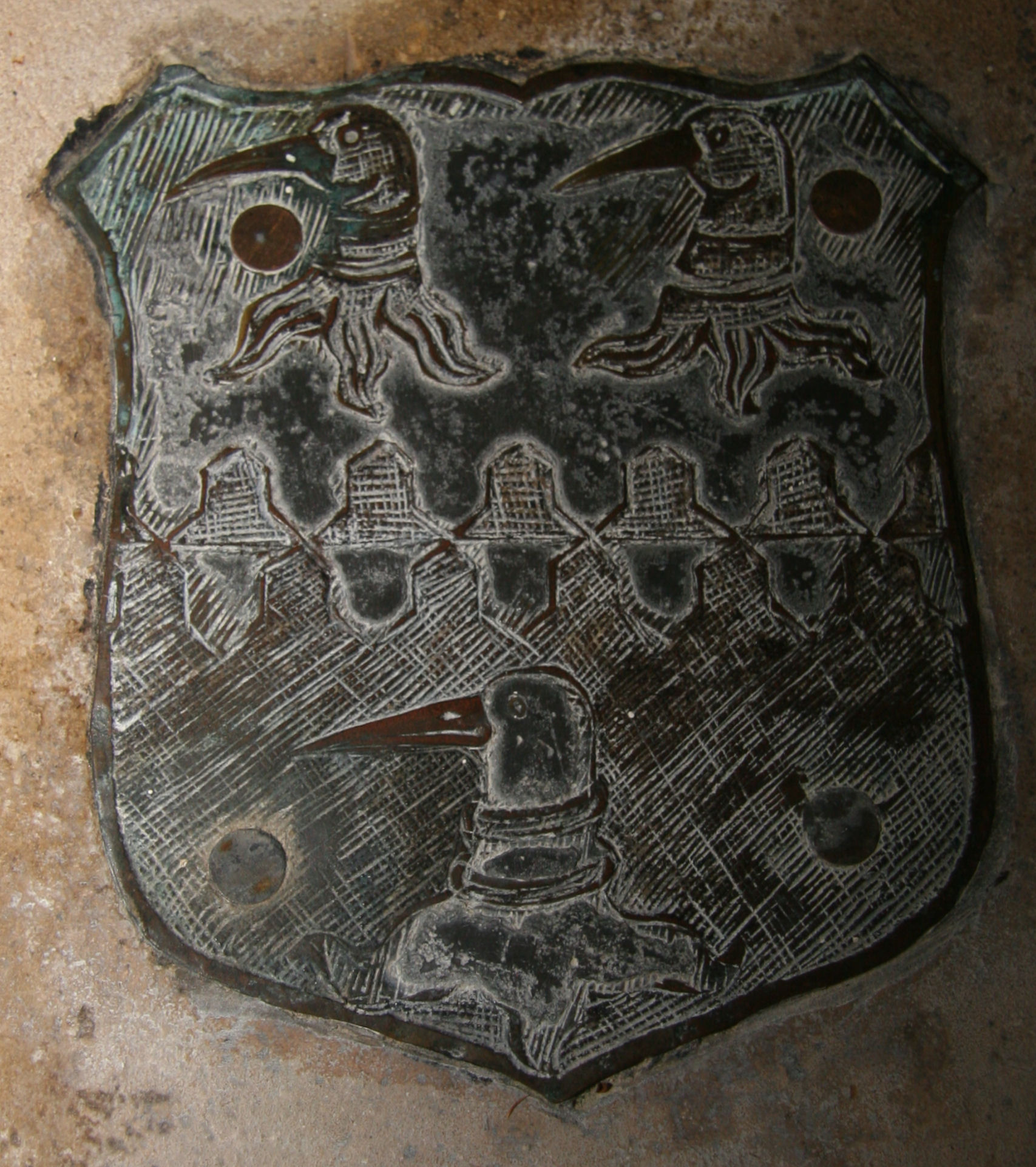
Three curlews' heads and necks erased.

depiction and arms of Thomas Williams

Thomas Williams (1514 – 1566) was a Speaker of the House of Commons. He was a lawyer and a member of the Inner Temple, sat as MP for Exeter (UK Parliament constituency) during the first and second Parliaments of Elizabeth I and was elected Speaker on 12 January 1563 and remained so until his unexpected death in 1566. His family home was Stowford House in the parish of Harford, Devon.

He was a Member of the Parliament of England for Bodmin 1555, Saltash 1558, Tavistock 1559 and Exeter 1563.

== Parliamentary life ==
=== Informing the House of Commons of the death of the Speaker ===
The Parliamentary entry states:

Lunae, 30o Septembris Proceedings on Death of the Speaker. At which Thirtieth Day of September, 1566, & Anno Octavo Elizabethae Reginae, Mr. Comptroller, declaring the Death of Mr. Williams, the late Speaker, moved, that some of the House might be sent up to the Lords, to require them, that they would be a Mean to the Queen's Majesty, that this House, by her Majesty's Licence, might proceed (according to the ancient Custom) to the Election of a Speaker: Whereupon immediately Mr. Comptroller, Mr. Secretary, with a convenient Number, went up to the Lords with that Message; and brought Answer, the Lords would gladly, by a convenient Number, do it; and required, that Four of this House, being of the Privy Council, might join with them therein.

The Lords named were, the Lord Keeper of the Great Seal, the Duke of Norfolk, the Lord Treasurer, and the Marquis of Northampton. Of this House were, Mr. Comptroller, Mr. Secretary Cicill, Sir Francis Knolles, Vicechamberlain, and Sir Ambrose Cave, Chancellor of the Duchy of Lancaster. And then agreed to meet there again at Nine of the Clock the Morrow following, to know the Queen's Majesty's Pleasure.

=== Informing the House of Lords of the death of the Speaker ===
Entry the Journal of the Proceedings of the House of Lords in the Session of Parliament holden at Westminster, An. 8 Regin. Eliz. A. D. 1566. which began there (after divers Prorogations of the same) on Monday 30 September, and then and there continued until the Dissolution thereof on Thursday the 2d day of Jan. Ann. 9. Regin. ejusdem. states:

This day Sir Edward Rogers Knight, Comptroller of her Highness Household, Sir Francis Knolles Knight, her Highness Vice-Chamberlain, Sir William Cecill Knight, her Highness Principal Secretary, and Sir Ambrose Cave Knight, Chancellor of her Highness Dutchy of Lancaster, four Chief Members of the House of Commons, and divers others of that Assembly to the number of twenty persons, being sent up to the Lords from that House upon some urgent and weighty occasions, desired to be admitted into the Upper House, there to make known to their Lordships somewhat wherein they should require their advice, and need their assistance; upon which, being admitted, the said Mr Comptroller, assisted with the Personages and Company aforesaid, did in comely order and discreet modesty, make manifest and known unto the said Lords, that Thomas Williams Esquire, their late Speaker in the last Session of this Parliament, in the fifth Year of the Queens Majesty that now is, was bereft from them by Death, which had been openly and manifestly made known and testified unto them; for remedy of which defection, they humbly prayed their Lordships advice; after which the Lord Keeper, first requiring the said Personages a while to withdraw themselves, and then commending the Order of the matter to the Lords sitting in consultation for the same, it was by them all upon considerate advice therein had, thought fit to signifie unto the said Commons by the Personages aforesaid, that they thought it expedient and good, the said Lord Keeper, the Lord Treasurer of England, the Duke his Grace of Norfolk, and the Lord Marquess of Northampton, with the four forecited Personages of the said House of Commons, being also of her Highness most Honourable Privy-Council, should in the name of both of the Assemblies, with all humbleness and due celerity, make intimation of their said Estate, and the Petition thereupon depending, unto her said Highness, to which advice the said House of Commons, upon knowledge had of the same, wholly assented.

=== Bills presented during his term as Speaker ===
Some of the Bills presented to Parliament whilst Thomas Williams was Speaker include:

- Bills of Restitution including the families of Archbishop Cranmer.
- that the Bible and Book of Service may be in the Welsh Tongue in Wales.
- for an Office of a Register, to keep the Church Books for Wedding, Christening and Burying.
- to revive the Statute for Punishment of Buggery.
- for Punishment of Invocations of Evil Spirits, Witchcraft, Inchantment, or Sorcery.
- against fond and fantastical Prophecies.
- for Punishment of Perjury by false Witnesses.
- for Relief of the Poor, by weekly Alms in every Parish.
- for further Punishment of Vagabonds, calling themselves Egyptians.
- against unlawful Taking of Fish, Deer, Conies or Hawks.
- for unlawful Nets to take Fish in Thamyse.
- for Destruction of Crows, Choughs, Rooks, and other such Vermin.
- touching Buying of Spanish or Ostrich, Wools for Hats or Felts.
- for the Orders and Wages of Servants of Husbandry and Artificers.
- that Cattle, purveyed for the Queen's Household, shall be branded with Pitch.
- that Gifts made by any Person of the Eighth Part of his Goods, within Eight Days before his Death, shall be void.

=== Personal life ===
Born to Adam Williams and Alice Prideaux, he married Emeline "Emliss" Crewes in Chimley in 1545 and they had five children: Thomasina, Joane, Emlyn, Thomas Jr., and John; John is reported to have sold the ancestral home to the Saverys in the reign of Charles 1. Thomas Sr. is buried in Harford Church, South Devon.

His coffin inscription says:

Here lyeth the corps of Thoms Willms esquire
Twice reader he in court was
Whose sacred minde to vertu did aspire
Of Parlament he speaker hence did passé
The comen he studied to preserue
And thew relygion ever to maynetayne
In place of justyce where as he dyd serue
And nowe in heaven wth mightie love doth raigne
Obiit primo die mensis Julii Ao Dni Moccccclxvi.
Aetatis suæ anno quinquagesimo secundo.

(These records reflect both the tombstones preserved in St Pedroc's Church, Harford and other genealogical records.)

Political offices
| Preceded by Sir Thomas Gargrave | Speaker of the House of Commons; 1563 | Succeeded by Richard Onslow |
