= Stowford House =

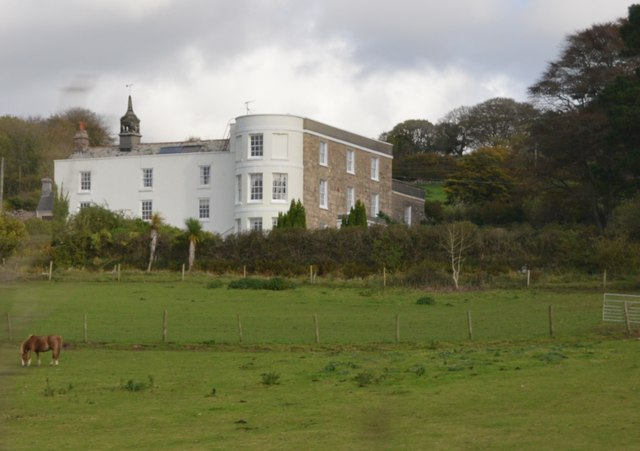
- Stowford House

General information
- Type: Manor House
- Classification: Grade II listed building
- Location: South Hams
- Coordinates: 50°23′49″N 3°54′49″W
- Completed: 18th century

Height
- Roof: Slate

Technical details
- Material: Stone rubble

Stowford House is a former manor house in the South Hams district of Devon. It is close to the village of Harford. The building was designated a Grade II listed building on 23 April 1952. The house was the birthplace of Thomas Williams, speaker at the House of Commons, and John Prideaux, Bishop of Worcester.

There has been a manor house on the grounds since the 14th century, and in 1400 there was a private chapel dedicated to St Nicholas. By 1664, the manor house and out buildings were recorded as having 14 hearths, implying that the house was much larger at the time. The house was significantly rebuilt during the 18th century, but parts of the old house from the 16th century remain. Built from stone rubble, the building is partly rendered, and partly ashlar. The roof of the building is slate, with external chimneystack on the north side. On the north and west sides of the buildings courtyard the mullion windows are bordered by hollow-chamfered stone.

Over the west wing of the house, there is a large chimneystack made of stone, with battlements at the top. On the north end of the house, there is a moulded stone chimneystack. The front aspect of the building has a glaze porch, which includes pilasters. Inside the house is a large fireplace made of granite. One of the first-floor rooms has panelling from the 18th century, with a 16th-century moulded stone fireplace. The other rooms on the floor have granite fireplaces, one topped with an ogee. The building has been divided into three separate homes.
