= Martin Hawke, 2nd Baron Hawke =

British peer and politician

Martin Bladen Hawke, 2nd Baron Hawke (20 April 1744 – 27 March 1805), was a British peer and politician.

== Background ==
Hawke was the son of Admiral Edward Hawke, 1st Baron Hawke, of Scarthingwell Hall, near Tadcaster, and of Catherine, the daughter of Walter Brooke. He was educated at Eton College and the Queen's College, Oxford, followed by the study of law at Lincoln's Inn.

== Political career ==
Hawke sat as Member of Parliament for Saltash from 1768 to 1774. In 1781 he succeeded his father in the barony and entered the House of Lords.

== Family ==
In 1771 Lord Hawke married Cassandra Turner, daughter of Sir Edward Turner, 2nd Baronet. They had two sons and four daughters. Lord Hawke died in March 1805, aged 60, and was succeeded by his eldest son, Edward. Lady Hawke died in November 1813.

Parliament of Great Britain
| Preceded by George Adams; Hon. Augustus Hervey | Member of Parliament for Saltash; 1768–1774; With: Thomas Bradshaw 1768–72; John Williams 1772; Thomas Bradshaw 1772–74 | Succeeded by Thomas Bradshaw; Grey Cooper |
Peerage of Great Britain
| Preceded by Edward Hawke | Baron Hawke; 1781–1805 | Succeeded by Edward Harvey Hawke |
