= Saltash (constituency) =

Former parliamentary constituency in the United Kingdom

- Former borough constituency for the House of Commons
- County: Cornwall
- Major settlements: Saltash

1552–1832
- Seats: Two
- Replaced by: East Cornwall

Saltash, sometimes called Essa, was a "rotten borough" in Cornwall which returned two Members of Parliament to the House of Commons in the English and later British Parliament from 1552 to 1832, when it was abolished by the Great Reform Act.

== History ==
The borough consisted of the town of Saltash, a market town facing Plymouth and Devonport across the Tamar estuary, and the inhabitants by 1831 were mainly fishermen or Devonport dockworkers. Like most of the Cornish boroughs enfranchised or re-enfranchised during the Tudor period, it was a rotten borough from the start.

Saltash was a burgage borough, meaning that the right to vote rested with the tenants of certain specified properties. For a long period in the 18th century, there was a contest for control of the borough between the government and the Buller family of Morval, depending partly on legal uncertainties over the precise number and identity of the burgage properties to which votes were attached. In the 1760s it was considered an entirely secure Admiralty borough, where the naval influence could sway all the voters, but by 1831 the Bullers owned all the tenancies and considered themselves the patrons.

In 1831, the borough had a population of 1,637, and 245 houses.

== Members of Parliament ==
=== MPs 1547–1629 ===
Parliament	First member	Second member
Parliament of 1547	Christopher Smith	Henry Fisher
Parliament of 1553 (Mar)	George Kekewich	Edward Saunders
Parliament of 1553 (Oct)	Richard Weston	Thomas Martin
Parliament of 1554 (Apr)	Peter St Hill	Humphrey Cavell
Parliament of 1554 (Nov)	Oliver Debett	Humphrey Cavell
Parliament of 1555	Alexander Nowell	Nicholas St John (?)
Parliament of 1558	Thomas Williams	Francis Yaxley
Parliament of 1559	Richard Reynell	Richard Forsett
Parliament of 1562	Thomas Carew	James Dalton
By-election 1566	Henry Killagrew	James Dalton
Parliament of 1571	William Page	James Dalton
Parliament of 1572-1581	William Page	James Dalton
Parliament of 1584	Richard Carew	Dr William Clerk
Parliament of 1586-1587	George Carew	John Acland
Parliament of 1588-1589	George Carew	Arthur Gorge
Parliament of 1593	George Carew	Jerome Horsey
Parliament of 1597-1598	Gregory Downhall	Ellis Wynn
Parliament of 1601	Sir Robert Cross	Alexander Nevill
Parliament of 1604-1611	Sir Peter Manwood	Thomas Wyvell
Addled Parliament (1614)	Ranulph Crewe	Sir Robert Phelips
Parliament of 1621-1622	Sir Thomas Trevor	Sir Thomas Smith
Happy Parliament (1624-1625)	Sir Thomas Trevor	Francis Buller
Useless Parliament (1625)	Sir Richard Buller	Francis Buller
Parliament of 1625-1626	Sir Richard Buller	Sir John Hayward
Parliament of 1628-1629	Sir Richard Buller	Sir Francis Cottington
No Parliament summoned 1629-1640

=== MPs 1640–1832 ===
Year	First member	First party	Second member	Second party
April 1640	George Buller	Parliamentarian	Francis Buller	Parliamentarian
November 1640	George Buller	Parliamentarian	Edward Hyde	Royalist
August 1642	George Buller	Parliamentarian	Hyde disabled from sitting - seat vacant	
1646	John Thynne		Henry Wills	
December 1648	Thynne and Wills excluded in Pride's Purge - both seats vacant			
1653	Saltash was unrepresented in the Barebones Parliament and the First and Second Parliaments of the Protectorate			
January 1659	Edmund Prideaux (of Prideaux Place, Padstow)		John Buller	
May 1659	Not represented in the restored Rump			
April 1660	Francis Buller		Anthony Buller	
1661	Francis Buller		John Buller	
February 1679	Bernard Granville		Nicholas Courtney	
September 1679	William Jennens		Sir John Davie	
1681	Bernard Granville		Sir John Davie	
1685	Sir Cyril Wyche		Edmund Waller	
1689	Bernard Granville		John Waddon	
1690	Sir John Carew		Richard Carew	
1691	Sir John Carew		Narcissus Luttrell	
1692	Michael Hill		Narcissus Luttrell	
1695	Francis Buller		Walter Moyle	Whig
March 1698	Francis Pengelly		Walter Moyle	Whig
August 1698	John Specott		John Morice	
1699	James Buller		John Morice	
January 1701	James Buller		Alexander Pendarves	Tory
March 1701	James Buller		Thomas Carew	
1702	Benjamin Buller		Thomas Carew	
1703	John Rolle		Thomas Carew	
1705	James Buller		Joseph Moyle	
May 1708	James Buller		Alexander Pendarves	Tory
December 1708	Sir Cholmeley Dering, Bt	Tory	Alexander Pendarves	Tory
1710	Jonathan Elford	Tory	Alexander Pendarves	Tory
1711	Jonathan Elford	Tory	Sir William Carew	
1713	Jonathan Elford	Tory	William Shippen	Tory
1715	Shilston Calmady		John Francis Buller	
1722	Thomas Swanton		Edward Hughes	
1723	Philip Lloyd		Edward Hughes	
1727	Lord Glenorchy		Edward Hughes	
1734	Lord Glenorchy		Thomas Corbett	
1741	John Clevland		Thomas Corbett	
1743	Stamp Brooksbank		Thomas Corbett	
July 1747	Edward Boscawen		Thomas Corbett	
December 1747	Stamp Brooksbank		Thomas Corbett	
1751	Stamp Brooksbank		George Brydges Rodney	
1754	Viscount Duncannon		George Clinton	
1756	Charles Townshend	Whig	George Clinton	
1761	John Clevland		George Adams	Whig
1763	Hon. Augustus Hervey		George Adams	Whig
1768	Martin Hawke		Thomas Bradshaw	
1772	Martin Hawke		John Williams	
1772	Martin Hawke		Thomas Bradshaw	
1774	Grey Cooper		Thomas Bradshaw	
1775	Grey Cooper		Sir Charles Whitworth	
1778	Grey Cooper		Henry Strachey	
1780	Grey Cooper		Paul Wentworth	
1780	Grey Cooper		Charles Jenkinson	
1784	Charles Ambler		Charles Jenkinson	
1786	Charles Ambler		The Earl of Mornington	
1787	Charles Ambler		John Lemon	
1790	Edward Bearcroft		Viscount Garlies	
1795	Edward Bearcroft		William Stewart	Tory
May 1796	Edward Bearcroft		The Lord Macdonald	
December 1796	Charles Smith		The Lord Macdonald	
1802	Matthew Russell		Robert Deverell	
1806	Matthew Russell		Arthur Champernowne	
February 1807	Hon. Richard Griffin	Whig	William Henry Fremantle	
May 1807	Matthew Russell		John Pedley	
1809	Matthew Russell		Michael Prendergast	
1818	Matthew Russell		James Blair	
March 1820	Matthew Russell		Michael Prendergast	
June 1820	Matthew Russell		John Fleming	
1822	William Russell	Whig	John Fleming	
June 1826	Andrew Spottiswoode		Henry Monteith	
December 1826	Andrew Spottiswoode		Colin Macaulay	
1830	Earl of Darlington		John Gregson	
February 1831	Earl of Darlington		Philip Cecil Crampton	
May 1831	Frederick Villiers	Whig	Bethell Walrond	
1832	Constituency abolished			

== Sources ==
- D Brunton & D H Pennington, “Members of the Long Parliament” (London: George Allen & Unwin, 1954)
- Cobbett's Parliamentary history of England, from the Norman Conquest in 1066 to the year 1803 (London: Thomas Hansard, 1808)
- Maija Jansson (ed.), Proceedings in Parliament, 1614 (House of Commons) (Philadelphia: American Philosophical Society, 1988)
- J Holladay Philbin, "Parliamentary Representation 1832 - England and Wales" (New Haven: Yale University Press, 1965)
- Willis, Browne (1750). Notitia Parliamentaria, Part II: A Series or Lists of the Representatives in the several Parliaments held from the Reformation 1541, to the Restoration 1660 ... London. p. 1.
- Leigh Rayment's Historical List of MPs – Constituencies beginning with "S" (part 2)
