= George Buller (MP) =

English politician

George Buller (1607 – before August 1646) was an English politician who sat in the House of Commons from 1640 to 1646.

Buller was the son of Sir Richard Buller, of Shillingham, Cornwall and his wife Alice Hayward, daughter of Sir Rowland Hayward. The Buller family was originally from Somerset and acquired Shillingham in around 1555.

In April 1640, Buller was elected Member of Parliament for Saltash in the Short Parliament. He was re-elected MP for Saltash for the Long Parliament in November 1640.

Buller died before August 1646 when a writ was issued for his replacement in parliament.

Buller was the brother of Francis Buller and Anthony Buller who were also MPs for Saltash.

Parliament of England
Vacant Parliament suspended since 1629	Member of Parliament for Saltash; 1640–1646; With: Francis Buller 1640	Succeeded by John Thynne; Henry Wills
