= Francis Buller (Parliamentarian) =

English politician

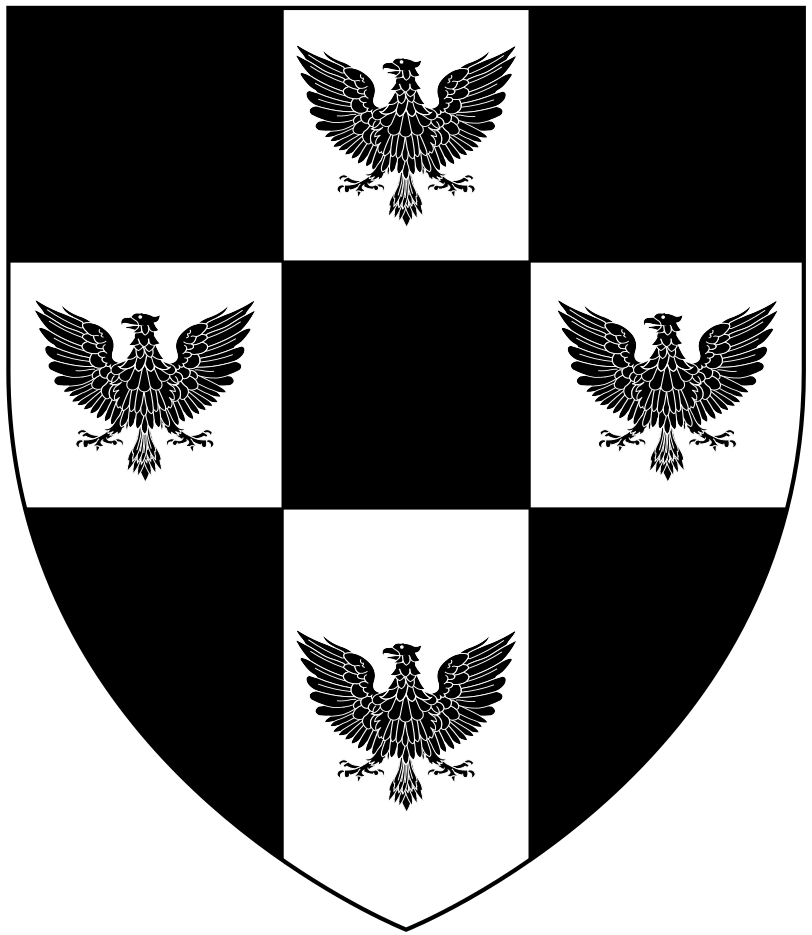
Arms of Buller: Sable, on a cross argent quarter pierced of the field four eagles displayed of the first

Francis Buller was an English politician who sat in the House of Commons variously between 1624 and 1648. He supported the Parliamentary side in the English Civil War.

Buller was the son of Sir Richard Buller, of Shillingham, Cornwall. The Buller family was originally from Somerset and acquired Shillingham in around 1555. He entered Sidney Sussex College, Cambridge in 1620 and matriculated at the Inner Temple in 1622. In 1624, Buller was elected member of parliament for Saltash and was re-elected in 1625.

In April 1640, Buller was elected MP for Saltash in the Short Parliament. He was elected MP for East Looe for the Long Parliament in November 1640 and sat until he was excluded under Pride's Purge in 1648. During the Civil War he commanded a regiment for the Parliamentary army at Plymouth. He subsequently moved to Kent.

Buller married Thomasine Honeywood, daughter of Sir Thomas Honeywood of Elmstead Kent. His sons Francis and John were also MPs in Cornwall.

Parliament of England
Preceded by Sir Thomas Trevor; Sir Thomas Smith	Member of Parliament for Saltash; 1624–1625; With: Sir Thomas Trevor 1624; Sir Richard Buller	Succeeded by Sir Richard Buller; John Heywood
Vacant Parliament suspended since 1629	Member of Parliament for Saltash; 1640; With: George Buller	Succeeded by George Buller; Edward Hyde
Preceded by William Scawen illiam Code	Member of Parliament for East Looe; 1640–1648; With: Thomas Lower 1640–1644; John Moyle 1647–1648	Succeeded by John Moyle
